= Kitchener, Ontario =

City in Canada

Kitchener
- City (lower-tier)
- City of Kitchener
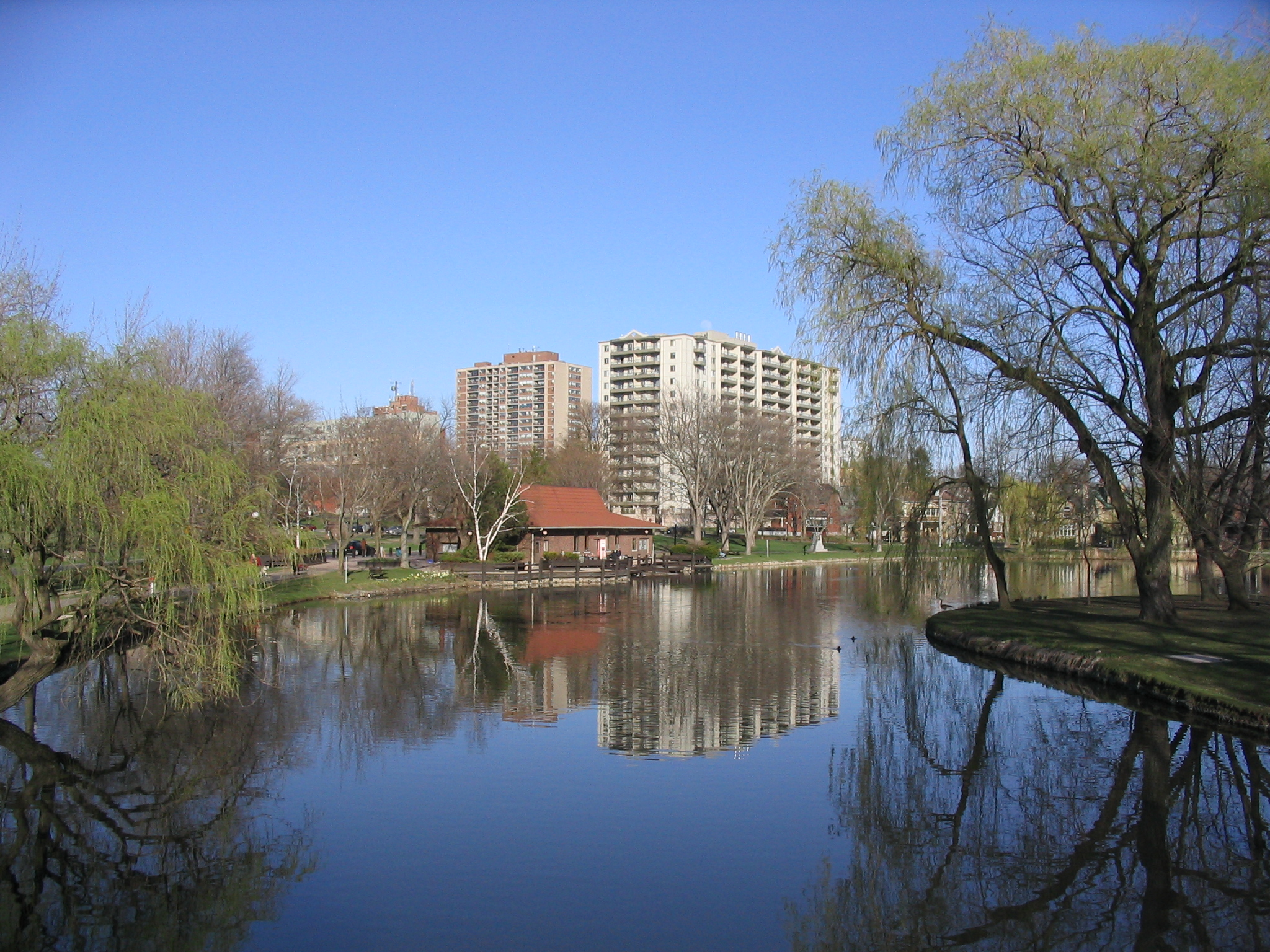
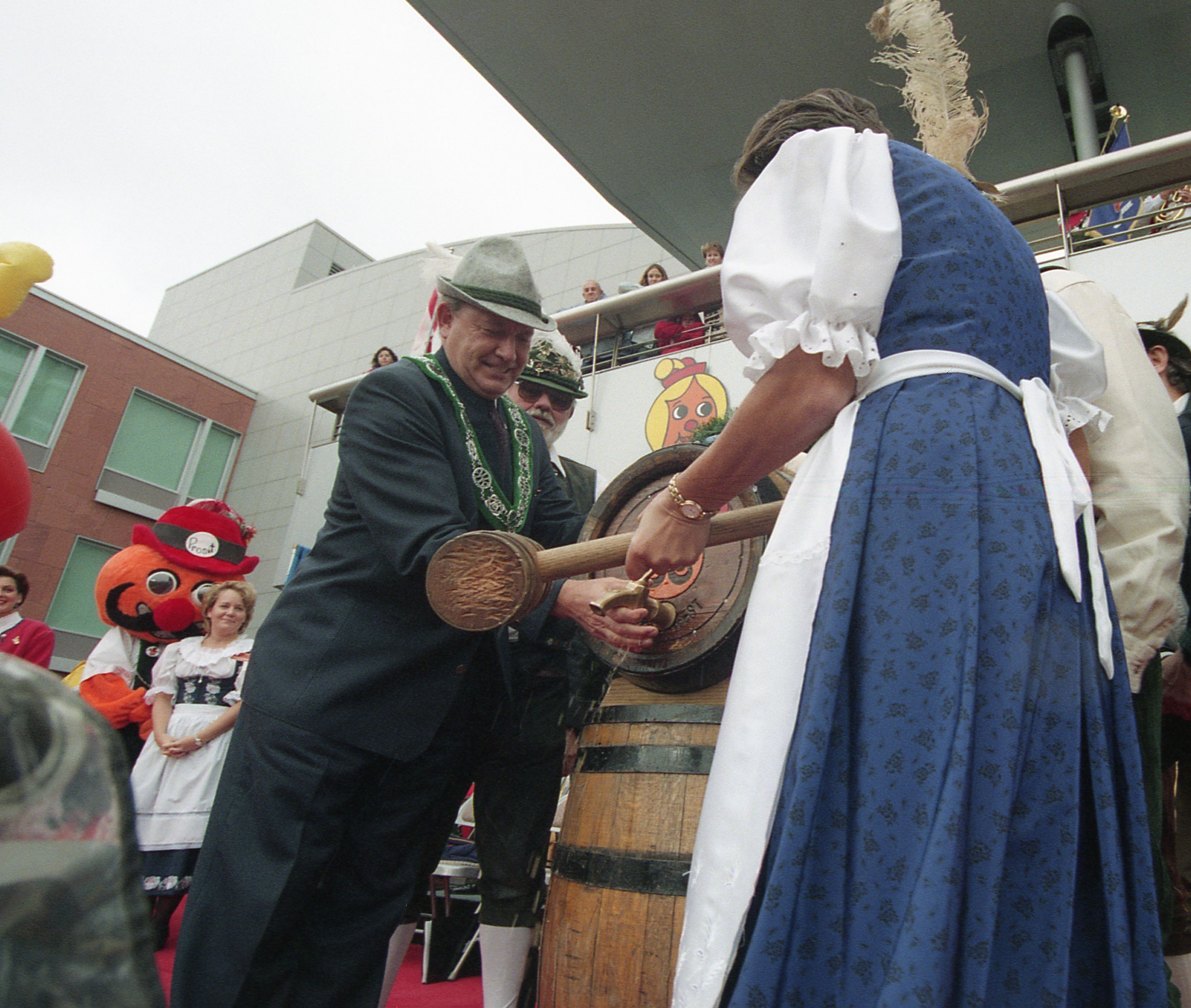
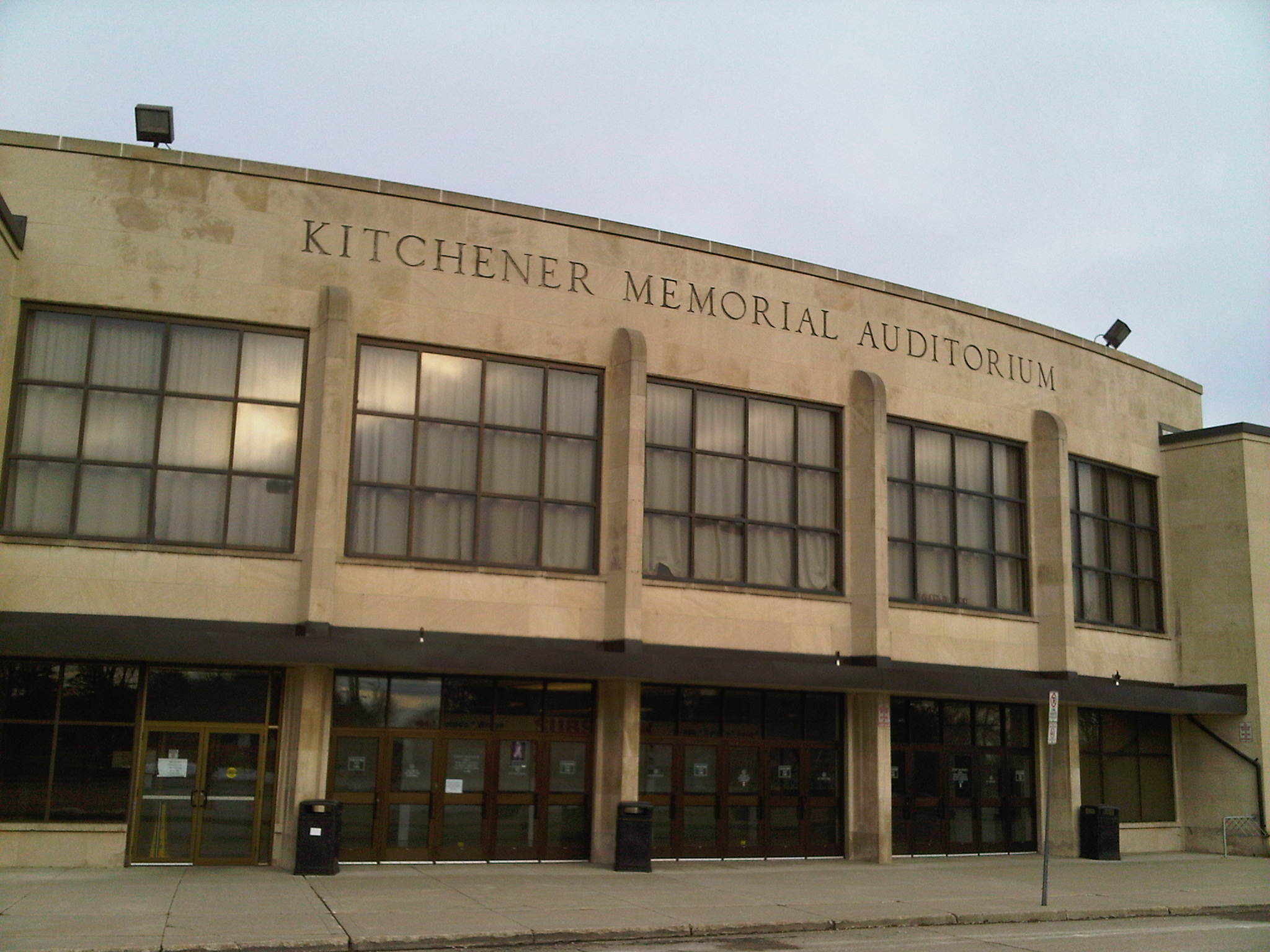
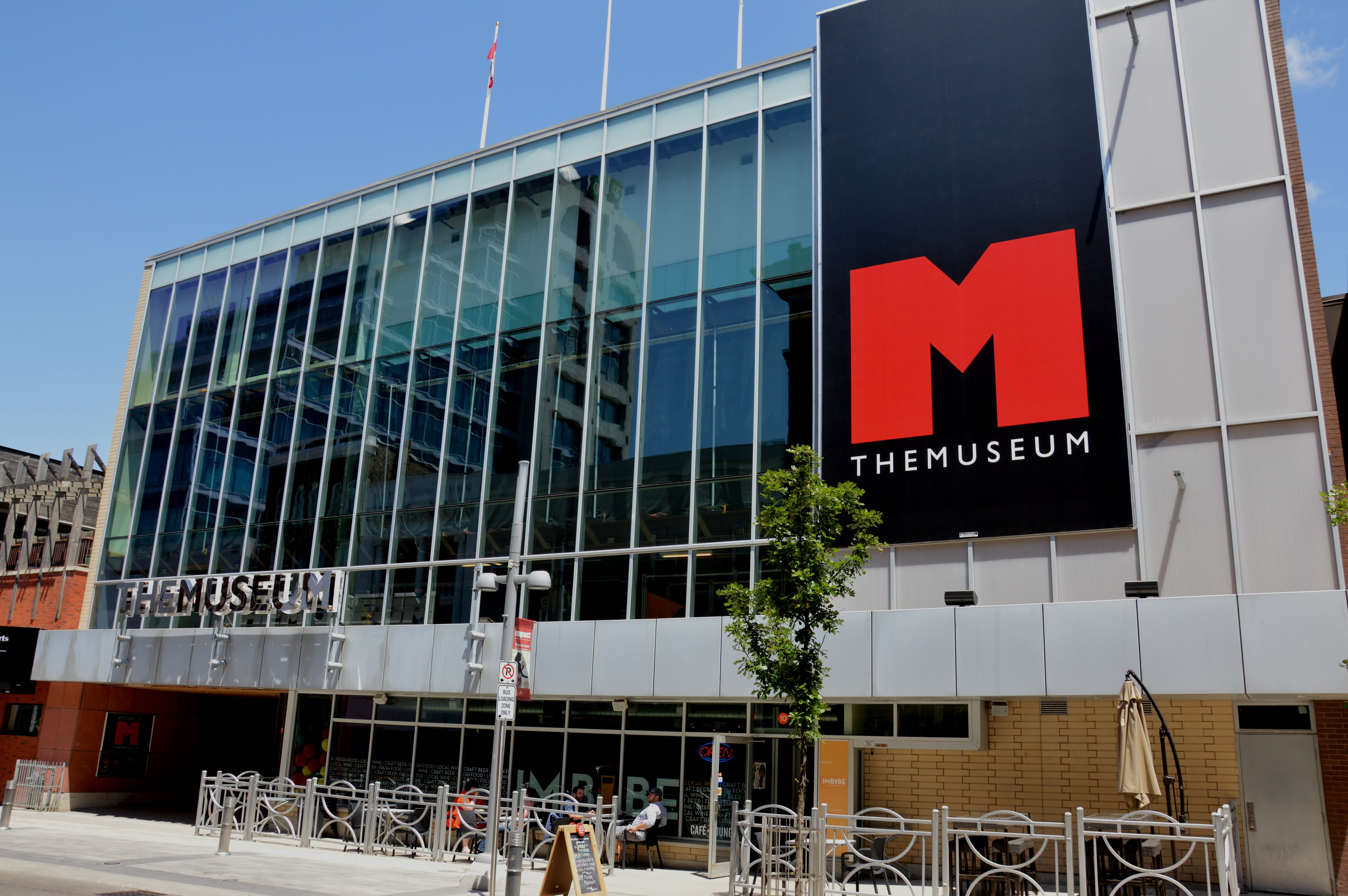
- Downtown Kitchener skyline Victoria Park Oktoberfest Kitchener Memorial Auditorium Complex TheMuseum From top, left to right: Downtown Kitchener, Benton and Frederick Streets, Kitchener Memorial Auditorium Complex, Oktoberfest, and Victoria Park

- Flag Seal Coat of arms Logo
- Motto: Ex industria prosperitas (Latin: Prosperity through industry)
- Interactive map of Kitchener
- Location within Canada Location within Southern Ontario Location within Regional Municipality of Waterloo
- Coordinates: 43°25′07″N 80°28′22″W
- Country: Canada
- Province: Ontario
- Region: Waterloo
- Founded: 1807
- Incorporated: 1833
- Incorporated: 1912 (city)

Government
  - Mayor: Berry Vrbanovic
  - Governing Body: Kitchener City Council
  - MPs: Matt Strauss (C); Tim Louis (L); Kelly DeRidder (C)
  - MPPs: Mike Harris (PC); Jess Dixon (PC); Aislinn Clancy (GPO)

Area
  - City (lower-tier): 136.81 km^{2} (52.82 sq mi)
  - Land: 136.81 km^{2} (52.82 sq mi)
  - Urban: 269.23 km^{2} (103.95 sq mi)
  - Metro: 1,091.16 km^{2} (421.30 sq mi)

Population (2021)
  - City (lower-tier): 256,885
  - Density: 1,877.7/km^{2} (4,863.2/sq mi)
  - Urban: 470,015 (10th)
  - Urban density: 1,745.8/km^{2} (4,522/sq mi)
  - Metro: 575,847 (10th)
  - Metro density: 480.1/km^{2} (1,243/sq mi)
- Demonym: Kitchenerite
- Time zone: UTC−5 (EST)
  - Summer (DST): UTC−4 (EDT)
- Forward sortation area: N2A to N2H, N2M to N2R
- Area codes: 519, 226, 548, and 382
- GNBC Code: FEBWC
- GDP (Kitchener–Cambridge–Waterloo CMA): CA$32.89 billion (2020)
- GDP per capita (Kitchener–Cambridge–Waterloo CMA): CA$52,484 (2016)
- Website: www.kitchener.ca

Kitchener is a city in the Canadian province of Ontario, about 100 km (62 mi) west of Toronto. It is one of three cities that make up the Regional Municipality of Waterloo and is the regional seat. Kitchener was known as Berlin until a 1916 referendum changed its name. The city covers an area of 136.86 km^{2}, and had a population of 256,885 at the time of the 2021 Canadian census.

The Regional Municipality of Waterloo has 673,910 people as of year-end 2023, making it the 10th-largest census metropolitan area (CMA) in Canada and the fourth-largest CMA in Ontario. Kitchener and Waterloo are considered twin cities, which are often referred to jointly as "Kitchener–Waterloo" (K–W), although they have separate municipal governments.

== History ==
=== Pre-contact indigenous history and land use ===
Indigenous people have long lived in and around what is today Kitchener-Waterloo. During the retreat of the last glacial maximum, the Waterloo Region was isolated by the ice to the north, east, and west and by Lake Maumee III to the south. However once the ice retreated the landscape opened up for nomadic populations to hunt, camp, and thrive; though not many sites from the Paleo-Indian Period (13,000BC to 1000BC) have been documented in the region thus far.

The Archaic Period (8,000BC to 800BC) still primarily consisted of nomadic hunter-gatherer communities spread out across the landscape. Advancements in technologies including less portable stone tools such as axes and adzes, more intricate tools made of animal bone such as fish hooks, gorges, and harpoons, and the entrance of Indigenous copper tools into the archaeological record is characteristic of this time period. More than two dozen archaeological sites from the Archaic Period have been documented in the Waterloo Region alone including campsites, tool manufacturing sites, and cemeteries.

Archaeologist Gary Warrick of Wilfrid Laurier University dates the expansion of the Neutral people to the Kitchener-Waterloo area sometime in the 1300s in what is referred to as the Woodland Period (900BC to 1650AD). A history states that at least two "aboriginal settlements from the 1500s can now be identified near Schneider and Strasburg Creeks" with some artifacts having been found under the city from a thousand years ago. The Iroquoian people grew crops such as corn, beans and squash. The finds include the remains of a First Nations village, estimated to be 500 years old, discovered in 2010 in the Strasburg Creek area of Kitchener. The inhabitants are thought to be ancestors of the Neutral Nation; artifacts found include the remains of longhouses, tools made of bone and of stone and arrowheads. One archaeologist stated that they discovered "artifacts going back as far as 9,000 years".

In 2020, a site at Fischer-Hallman Road was found to include artifacts from a "Late Woodland Iroquois village" that was inhabited circa 1300 to 1600. Archeologists found some 35,000 objects including stone tools and a 4,000 year old arrowhead.

To date, there are more than 18 Late-Woodland Period village sites documented in the Waterloo Region.

=== Early European settlement ===
==== German company tract ====
Kitchener stands on a part of the Haldimand Tract, the lands of the Grand River valley purchased in 1784 by the British from the Mississaugas in order to grant it to the Six Nations for their allegiance during the American Revolution. Between 1796 and 1798, the Six Nations sold 38,000 hectares of this land to loyalist Colonel Richard Beasley. The portion of land that Beasley purchased was remote, but of great interest to German Mennonite farming families from Pennsylvania. They wanted to live in an area that would allow them to practice their beliefs without persecution. Eventually, the Mennonites purchased all of Beasley's unsold land, creating 160 farm tracts.

Many of the pioneers arriving from Pennsylvania, known as the Pennsylvania Dutch or Pennsilfaanisch-Deitsche (Deutsch; German-speaking mainly from Switzerland and the Palatinate, not modern Dutch), after November 1803 bought land in a 60,000-acre section of Block Two from the German Company, which was established by a group of Mennonites from Lancaster County, Pennsylvania. The tract included most of Block 2 of the previous Grand River Indian lands. Many of the first farms were least 400 acres in size. The German Company, represented by Daniel Erb and Samuel Bricker, had acquired the land from previous owner Richard Beasley; he had gotten into financial difficulties after buying the land in 1796 from Joseph Brant, who represented the Six Nations. The payment to Beasley, in cash, arrived from Pennsylvania in kegs, carried in a wagon surrounded by armed guards.

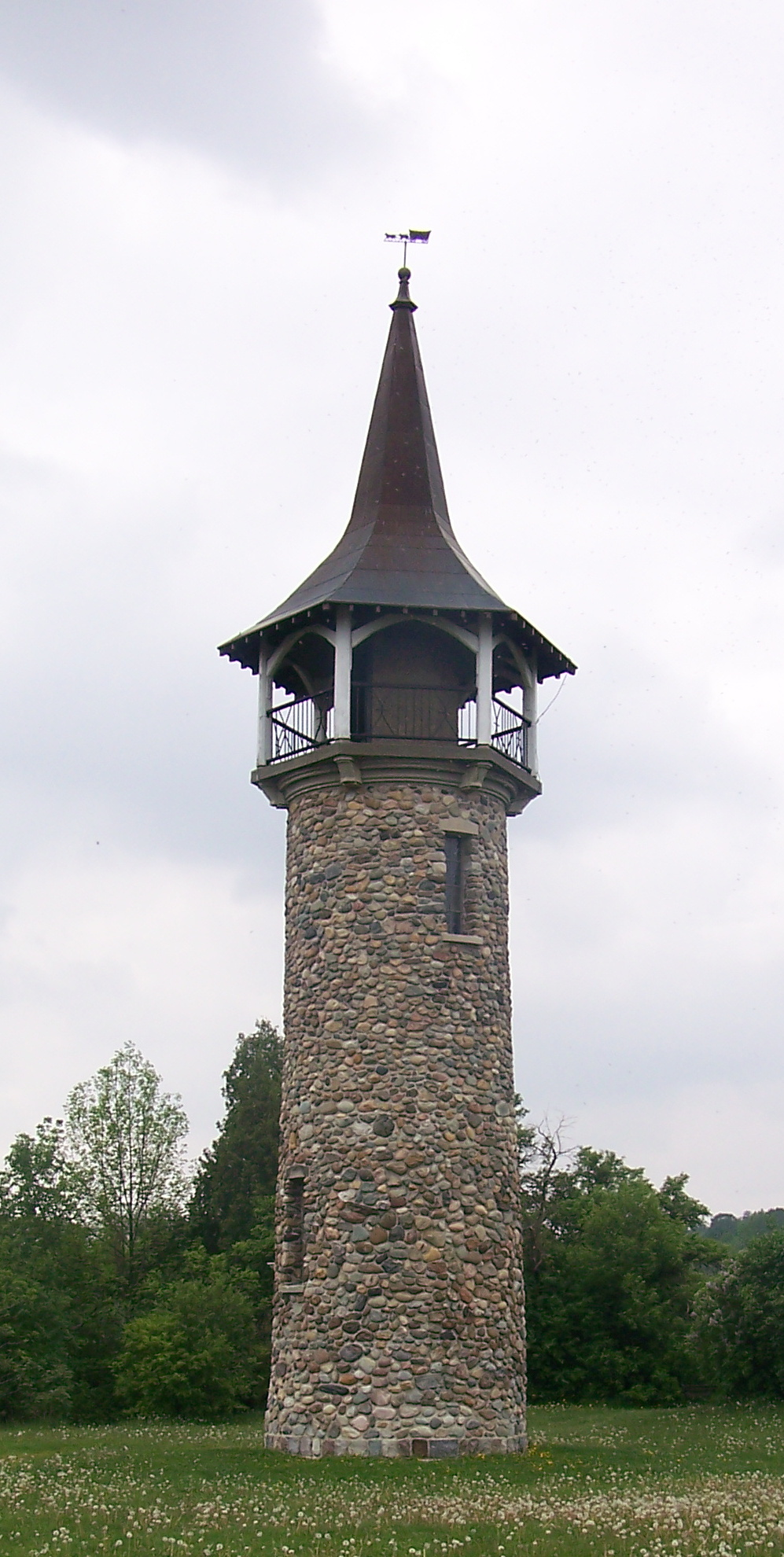
Waterloo Pioneer Memorial Tower. Built in 1926, it is dedicated to the Pennsylvania-German pioneers who arrived between 1800 and 1803.

The first settlers in the area of what would become the village of Doon (now a suburb of Kitchener) arrived in 1800. They were two Mennonites from Franklin County, Pennsylvania who were also brothers in law, Joseph Schoerg (later called Sherk) and Samuel Betzner Jr. Joseph Schoerg and his wife settled on Lot 11, B.F. Beasley Black, S.R., on the bank of the Grand River opposite Doon, and Betzner and his wife settled on the west bank of the Grand, on a farm near the village of Blair.

The homes built by the next generation of these families still stand as of March 2021, on what is now Pioneer Tower Road in Kitchener and have been listed as historically important; the John Betzner homestead (restored) and the David Schoerg farmstead (not yet restored) were erected circa 1830.

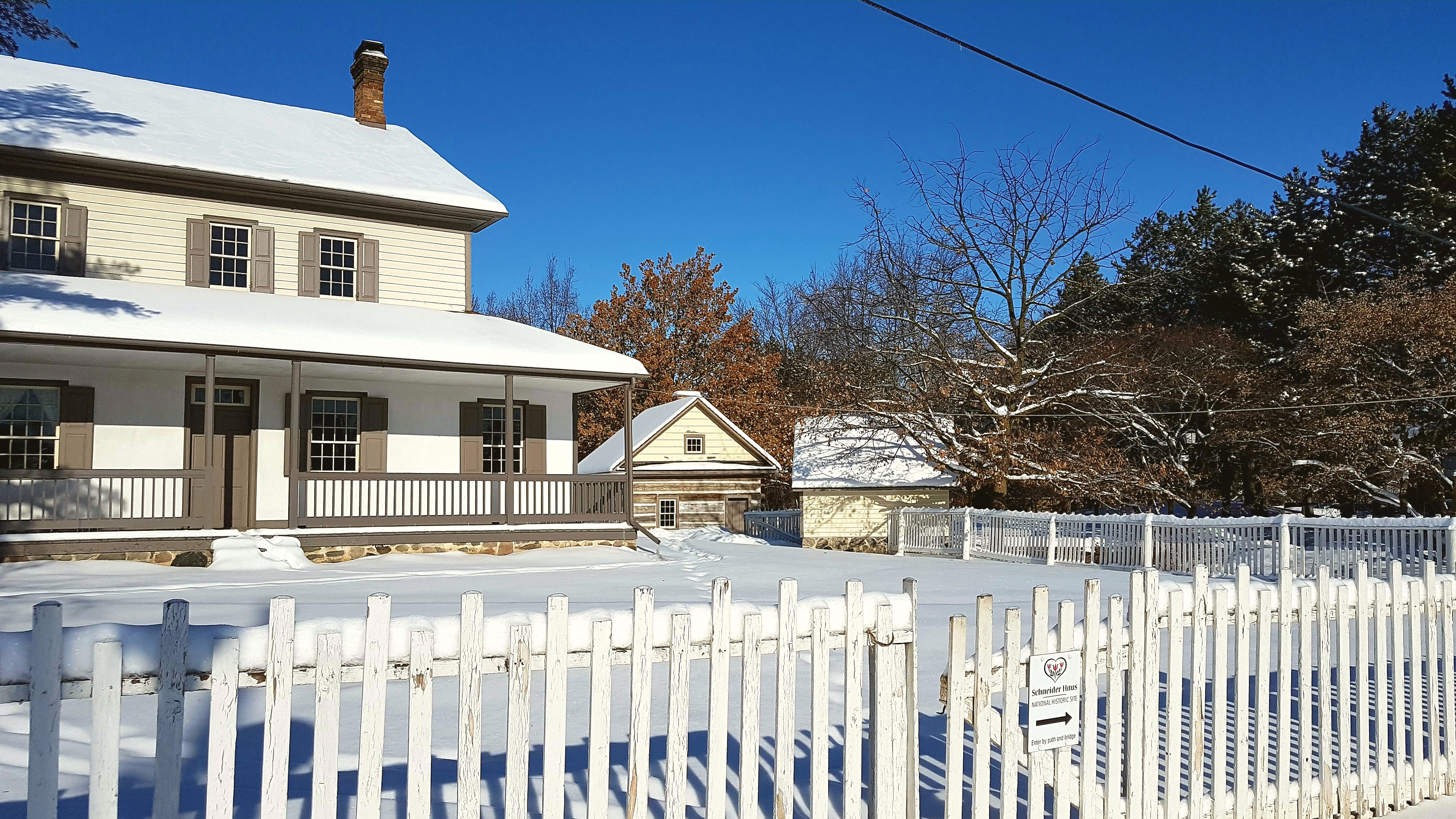
Schneider Haus, built in 1816, is now a museum and National Historic Site.

By 1800, the first buildings in Berlin had been built, and over the next decade, several families made the difficult trip north to what was then known as the Sandhills. One of these Mennonite families, arriving in 1807, was the Schneiders, whose restored 1816 home (the oldest building in the city) is now a National Historic Site and museum in the heart of Kitchener. Other families whose names can still be found in local place names were the Bechtels, the Ebys, the Erbs, the Webers, the Cressmans, and the Brubachers. In 1816, the government of Upper Canada designated the settlement the Township of Waterloo.

Much of the land, made up of moraines and swampland interspersed with rivers and streams, was converted to farmland and roads. Wild pigeons, which once swarmed by the tens of thousands, were driven from the area. Apple trees were introduced to the region by John Eby in the 1830s, and several gristmills and sawmills were erected throughout the area, most notably Joseph Schneider's 1816 sawmill, John and Abraham Erb's grist- and sawmills, Jacob Shantz's sawmill, and Eby's cider mill. Schneider built Berlin's first road, from his home to the corner of King Street and Queen Street (then known as Walper Corner). The settlers raised $1,000 to extend the road from Walper Corner to Huether Corner, where the Huether Brewery was built and the Huether Hotel now stands in the city of Waterloo; a petition to the government for $100 to assist in completing the project was denied.

==== Settlement before Ebytown (1804–1806) ====
Members of the Eby family, most notably Benjamin Eby, began migrating to the German Company Tract lands in the first decade of the 19th century. The Ebys were an old Swiss Mennonite family with an association with religious non-conformist movements in Europe going back possibly as far as the Middle Ages, and who were early followers of Anabaptism. Jacob Eby, an ancestor of the Ebys who migrated to Upper Canada, was a Mennonite bishop in the Swiss canton of Zürich in 1683. The family first migrated to the Palatinate, then to Pennsylvania, settling in Lancaster County. In Lancaster County, members of the family, such as Peter Eby (1765–1843), continued to act as Mennonite religious leaders. The Ebys became involved in early land settlement of the German Company Tract, with a number arriving between 1804 and 1807 and taking up farming plots.

Two brothers, George and Samuel ("Indian Sam") Eby, arrived in 1804 and settled on Lot 1 of the German Company Tract, near the area of what would become downtown Kitchener. George Eby's farmstead was located one mile southeast from the future Berlin town core. It was later owned by Jacob Yost Shantz, who built a large farmhouse there in 1856 at what became the corner of Maurice and Ottawa Streets. Samuel Eby settled on the northwest part of Lot 1 and soon became a close associate of the Mississaugas who lived in the area, selling whisky to them.

==== Ebytown to Berlin (1806–1852) ====
Later named the founder of Berlin, Benjamin Eby (made Mennonite preacher in 1809, and bishop in 1812) arrived from Lancaster County, Pennsylvania, in 1806, and purchased a large tract of land consisting of much of what would become the village of Berlin, so named in 1833). The settlement was initially called Ebytown, and was at the south-east side of what later became Queen Street. Eby was also responsible for the growth of the Mennonite church in Waterloo County. By 1811, Eby had built a log Mennonite meeting house first used as a school house, but later also housing religious services. A new meeting house, known as Eby's Versammlungshaus, near Stirling Avenue, replaced the log house in 1834, while a schoolhouse was built on Frederick Street about the same time.

Benjamin Eby encouraged manufacturers and craftsmen to relocate to Ebytown. Jacob Hoffman came in 1829 or 1830, and started the first furniture factory. John Eby, druggist and chemist, arrived from Pennsylvania in about 1820, and opened a shop to the west of what would later be Eby Street. At the time, settlers commonly formed a building "bee" to help newcomers erect a log home. Immigration from Lancaster County continued heavily in the 1820s because of a severe agricultural depression there. Joseph Schneider, from that area, built a frame house in 1820 on the south side of the future Queen Street after clearing a farm and creating a rough road; a small settlement formed around "Schneider's Road", which became the nucleus of Berlin. The home was renovated over a century later and still stands.

The village centre of Ebytown was established in 1830 by Phineas Varnum, who leased land from Joseph Schneider and opened a blacksmith shop on the site where a hotel would be built many years later, the Walper House. A tavern was also established here at the same time, and a store was opened. At the time, the settlement of Ebytown was still considered to be a hamlet.

Friedrich Gaukel, another prominent early local figure, purchased the Varnum tavern site in the early 1830s, along with other lands around the growing village. In a November 1833 transaction, he purchased lands located along the village's main street (later known as King Street) from Joseph Schneider. The deeds of sale for this transaction are the earliest recorded use of the name Berlin to refer to the community.

The 1826–1837 cholera pandemic affected Bridgeport in 1832 and Berlin in 1834. Hamilton, then a significant port of entry for immigrants to Canada, was linked to the 1832 outbreak, which also affected other nearby settlements such as Guelph and Brantford. At Bridgeport, two English families who had recently arrived from Suffolk contracted the disease after passing through Hamilton, and several died after arriving at the community. They also spread it to an already-settled family, the Hemblings, a number of whom also died, including adults. Orphaned children from these families were later adopted by local Mennonites.

The Smith's Canadian Gazetteer of 1846 describes Berlin as: "... contains about 400 inhabitants, who are principally Germans. A newspaper is printed here, called the "German Canadian" and there is a Lutheran meeting house. Post Office, post twice a-week. Professions and Trades.—One physician and surgeon, one lawyer, three stores, one brewery, one printing office, two taverns, one pump maker, two blacksmiths." The Township of Waterloo (smaller than Waterloo County) consisted primarily of Pennsylvanian Mennonites and immigrants directly from Germany who had brought money with them. At the time, many did not speak English. There were eight grist and twenty saw mills in the township. In 1841, the township population count was 4,424.

The first cemetery in the city was the one next to Pioneer Tower in Doon; the first recorded burial at that location was in 1806. The cemetery at First Mennonite church is not as old, but contains the graves of some notable citizens, including Bishop Benjamin Eby, who died in 1853, Joseph Schneider, and Rev. Joseph Cramer, founder of the House of Friendship social service agency.

==== County seat (1853) ====
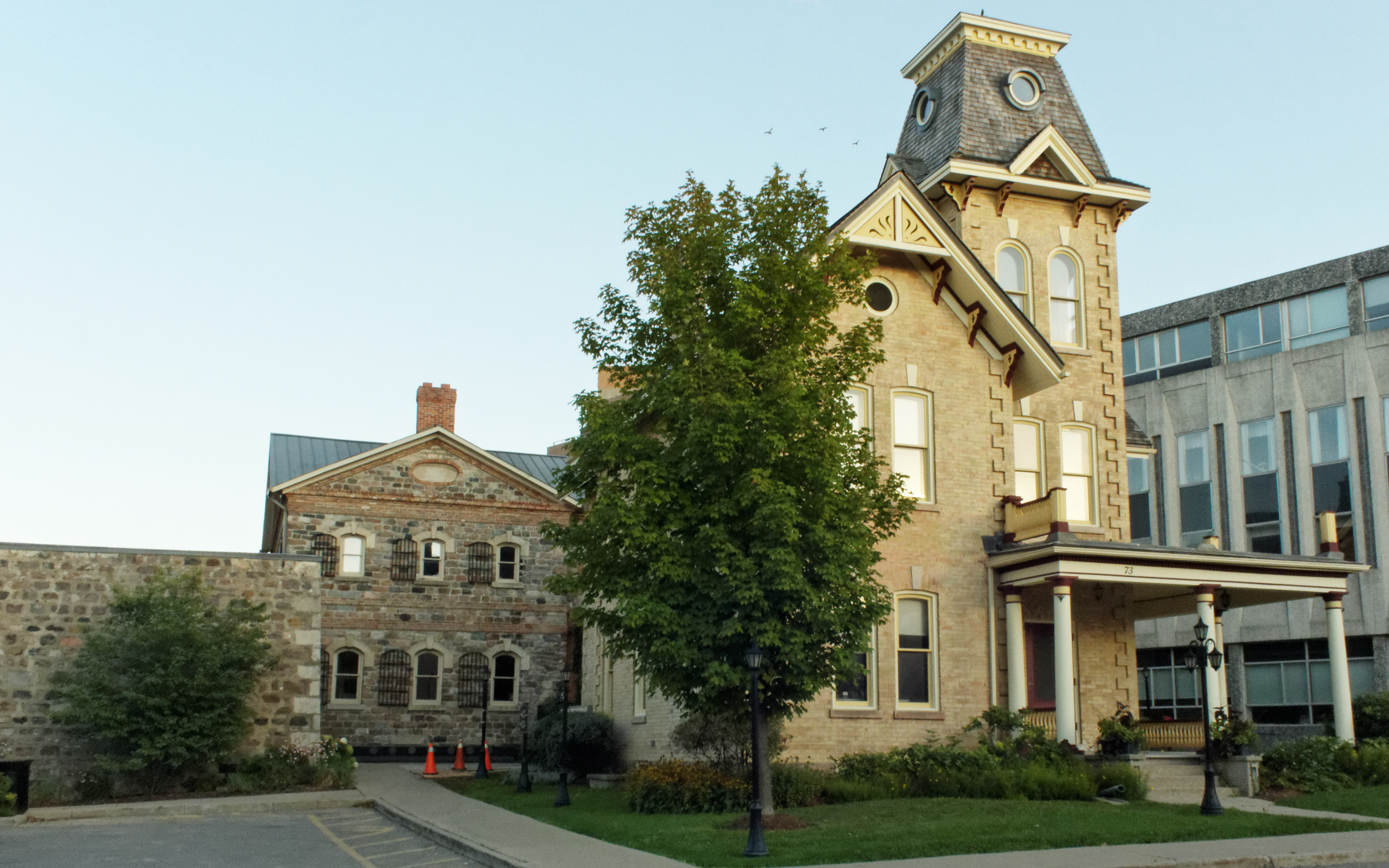
Waterloo County Jail and Governor's House, Kitchener, built 1852

Previously part of the United County of Waterloo, Wellington, and Grey, Waterloo became a separate entity in 1853 with Berlin as county seat. Some contentious debate had existed between Galt and Berlin as to where the seat would be located; one of the requirements for founding was the construction of a courthouse and jail. When local merchant Joseph Gaukel donated a small parcel of land he owned (at the current Queen and Weber Streets), this sealed the deal for Berlin, which was still a small community compared to Galt. The courthouse at the corner of the later Queen Street North and Weber Street and the gaol were built within a few months. The first county council meeting was held in the new facility on 24 January 1853, as the county officially began operations.

The Waterloo County Gaol is the oldest government building in the Region of Waterloo. The Governor's House, home of the "gaoler", in a mid-Victorian Italian Villa style, was added in 1878. Both have been extensively restored and are on the Canadian Register of Historic Places.

=== "Busy Berlin" (late 19th century) ===
==== Arrival of the railways ====
The extension of the Grand Trunk Railway from Sarnia to Toronto (and hence through Berlin) in July 1856 was a major boon to the community, helping to improve industrialization in the area. Immigrants from Germany, mostly Lutheran and Catholic, dominated the city after 1850, and developed their own newer German celebrations and influences, such as the Turner societies, gymnastics, and band music. In 1869, Berlin had a population of 3000.

In the late 1880s, the idea of a street railway connection to Waterloo was promoted, resulting in the construction of the Berlin and Waterloo Street Railway in 1888. It was electrified in 1895, making it the first electric railway in Berlin, though not the first in the county, as the Galt and Preston Street Railway had opened with electric operation in 1894. This was followed by the construction of the Preston and Berlin Street Railway in 1904, which connected Berlin to Preston (now a part of Cambridge) to the southeast.

==== House of Industry and Refuge ====
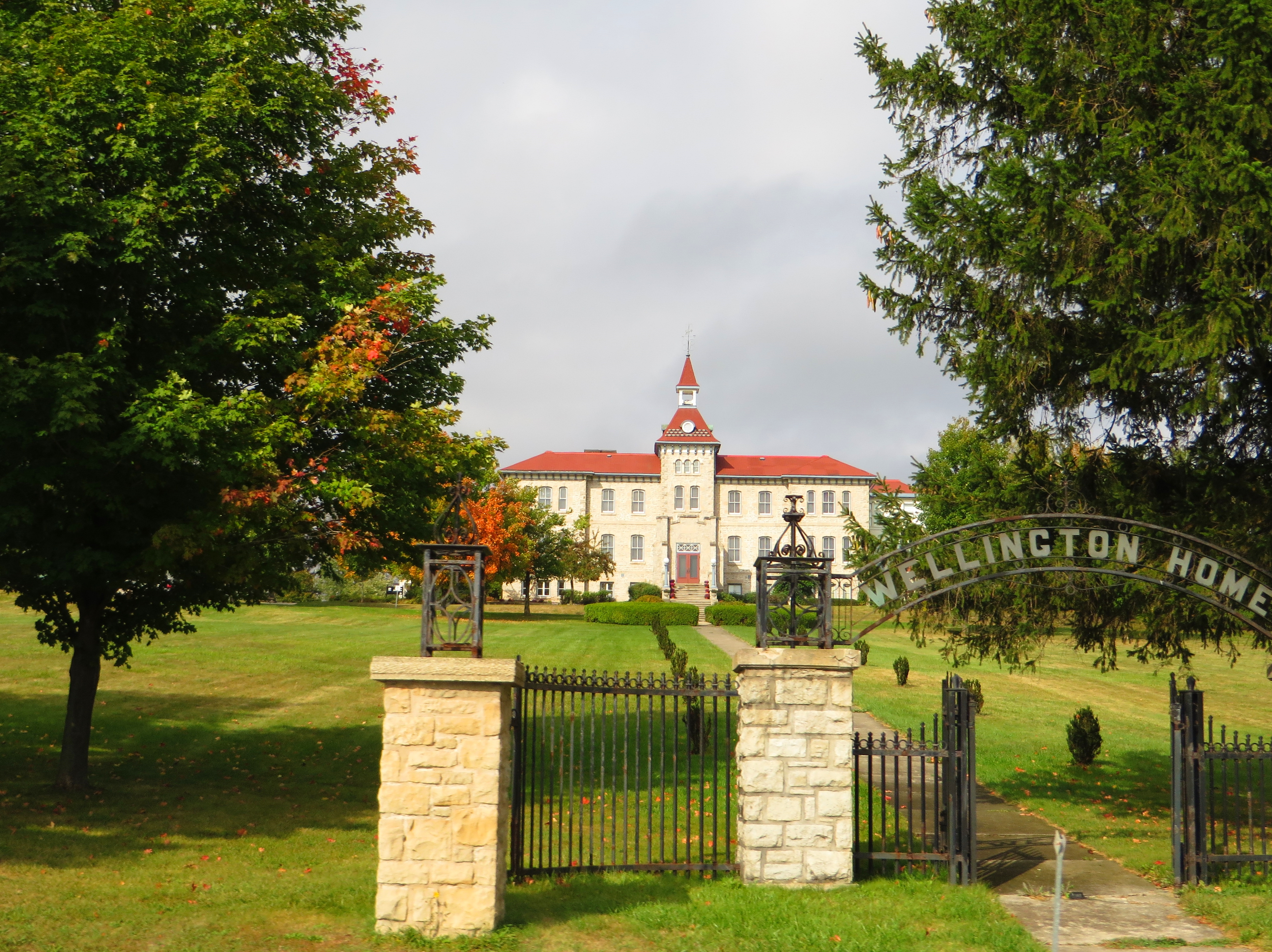
The House of Industry and Refuge in nearby Wellington County has been preserved as a National Historic Site.

In 1869, the county government built a very large so-called poorhouse with an attached farm, the House of Industry and Refuge that accommodated some 3,200 people before being closed in 1951; the building was later demolished. It was on Frederick St. in Kitchener, behind the now Frederick Street Mall, and was intended to minimize the number of people begging, living on the streets, or being incarcerated at a time before social-welfare programmes. A 2009 report by the Toronto Star explains, "pauperism was considered a moral failing that could be erased through order and hard work".

A research project by the Laurier School of Social Work has amassed all available data about the house and its residents, digitized it, and made the archive available online. According to Sandy Hoy, a director of research projects, the "inmates" included not only the poor, but also those with disabilities, women, and children. Some were single women who had been servants and became pregnant. Since there were no social services, they were sent to the House. "We saw a lot of young, single mothers in the records," said Laura Coakley, a research co-ordinator. The archives also indicate that in addition to food and shelter for "inmates", in return for labour in the house and on the attached farm, the house also donated food, clothing, and money for train tickets to enable the poor to reach family that might be able to support them. Two cemeteries for the poor also were nearby, including "inmates" of the house who had died.

==== Civic institutions ====
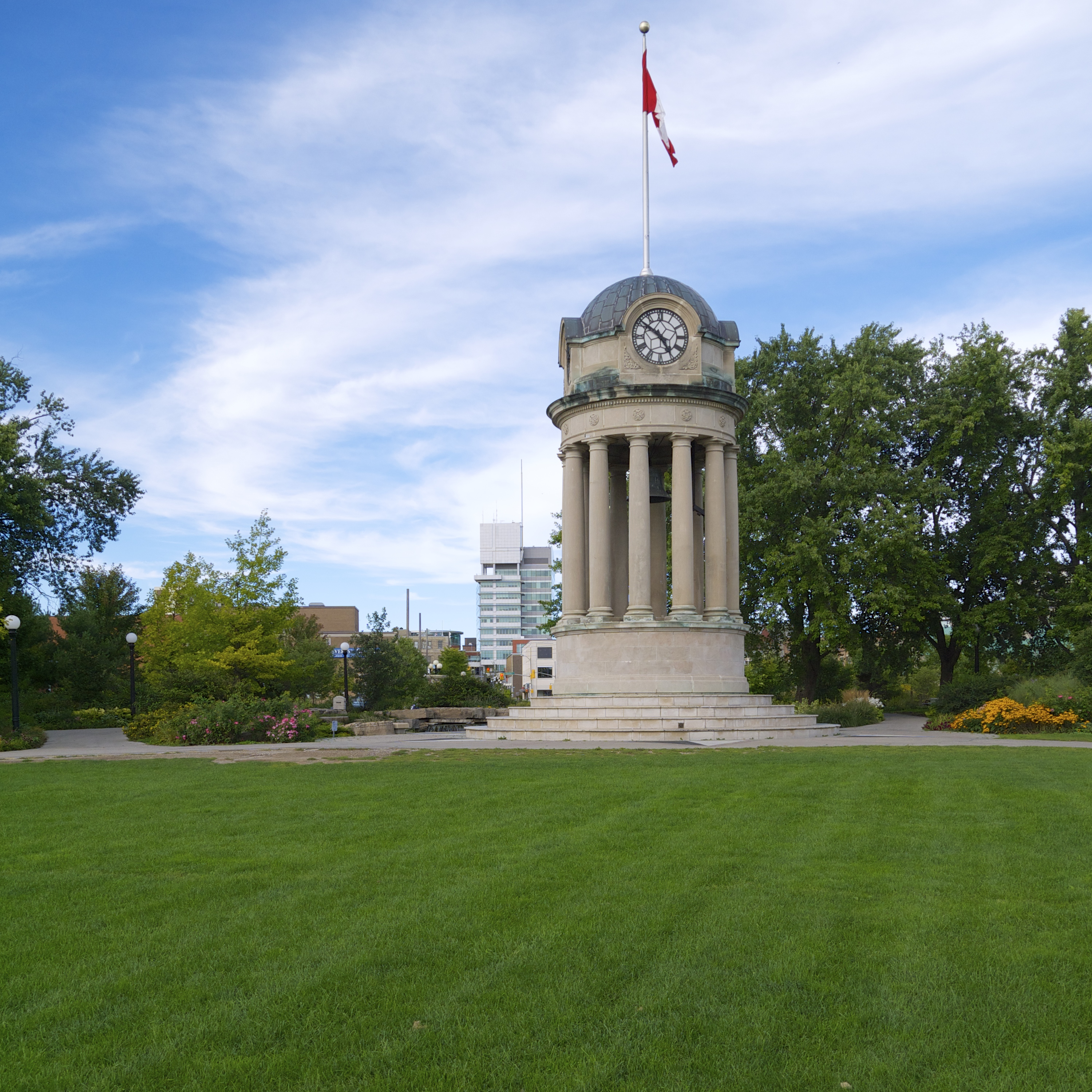
The old City Hall clock tower in Victoria Park

On 9 June 1912, Berlin was designated a city. At this time, the City Hall was in the two-story building at King and Frederick Streets that had also been used as the Berlin town hall, completed in 1869 by builder Jacob Y. Shantz. During its tenure, the structure was also used as a library, theatre, post/telegraph office, market, and jail. That building was demolished in 1924 and replaced by a new structure behind it, designed by architects William Schmalz and Bernal Jones, featuring a classical-revival style and a large civic square in front. Demolished in 1973, and replaced by an office tower and the Market Square shopping mall, the old City Hall's clock tower was later (1995) erected in Victoria Park. The building was not replaced by the current Kitchener City Hall on King Street until 1993; the architect for the latter was Bruce Kuwabara. During the interim years, the city had occupied leased premises on Frederick Street.

Kitchener was in many cases within Ontario the earliest adopter, or one of the earliest adopters, of many municipal institutions which later became commonplace. These institutions included library boards, planning boards, and conservation authorities. Known collectively as the agencies, boards, and commissions (ABCs), these special-purpose bodies became a characteristic element of Canadian governance. The ABCs movement in Kitchener began in the 1890s with the passage of the 1894 Public Parks Act transferring management of the town's parkland from a committee of the town council to a parks board, an initiative which ultimately led to the creation of Victoria Park. A prominent supporter of this movement was John Richard Eden, who would later become mayor of the town in 1899. The parks board was followed in 1899 by a water commission, whose creation was heavily supported by local industrialists following a devastating fire at a local factory in 1896, as well as due to the need by many industries for a reliable water supply. The town's local gas plant and electric utility was similarly municipalized in 1903, resulting in the creation of the Berlin Light Commission.

Facing a mounting sewage problem, especially as a result of effluent from the town's industrial tanneries, local leaders in Berlin campaigned at a provincial level to be allowed to create a sewage commission, for which there was no provision in provincial legislation. Ultimately, a private bill was passed, allowing Berlin to create the first sewage commission in Canada in 1904. The Berlin and Waterloo Street Railway was soon also taken over and municipalized. Kitchener was the first city in Ontario to get hydroelectric power in long-distance transmission lines from Niagara Falls, on October 11, 1910. The growing roster of public utilities managed by the Light Commission led to its reorganization into the Kitchener Public Utilities Commission in 1924, which operated as the municipal gas, electric, and light utility, as well as the local street railway operator.

==== Berlin-to-Kitchener name change ====
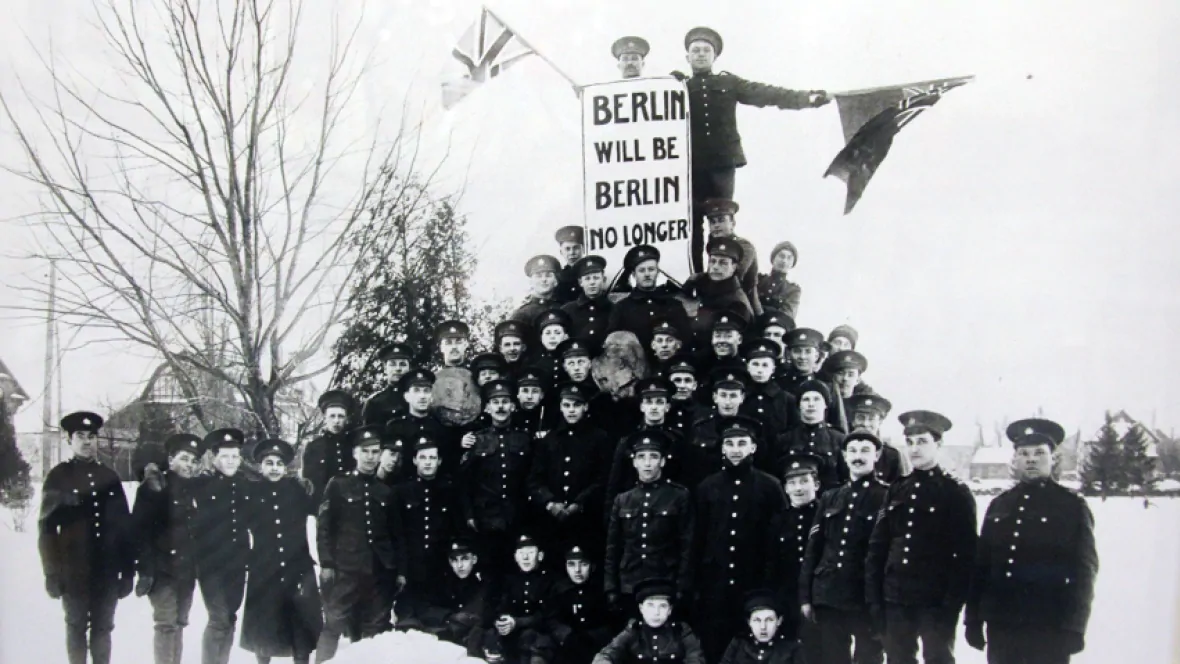
A day after raiding a local German social club, soldiers of the local 118th Battalion gather around the 1897 Peace Memorial in Victoria Park with a banner bearing the phrase "Berlin will be Berlin No Longer", 16 February 1916.

Berlin's character had been predominantly German since Waterloo Township's settlement by Pennsylvania Dutch pioneers in the early 19th century, and its urban growth and industrialization was bolstered in large part by Germans and other peoples from Central and Eastern Europe, who brought with them skills, tools, and machinery, as well as diverse religious and social customs. The outbreak of the First World War pitted the British Empire (and by extension, Canada) against the German, Austro-Hungarian, and Ottoman empires, and led to a wave of suspicion, exclusion, and discriminatory measures against people whose ethnic origins were associated with these states. Thousands of Ukrainians, Germans, Turks, and Bulgarians were forcibly placed into internment camps by the Dominion government under the War Measures Act, which was passed in August 1914. Internees had their property confiscated and many of them were subjected to forced labour. Tens of thousands of others were subjected to government surveillance.

In Berlin, anti-German sentiment slowly escalated throughout the war, beginning with the vandalizing of the statue of Kaiser Wilhelm I in Victoria Park in 1914. Despite pronouncements of loyalty and commitment to the war effort, the city's German community was subjected to physical violence and attacks on property by soldiers of the 118th Battalion of the Canadian Expeditionary Force. In a set of referendums in 1916, Berlin was renamed to Kitchener, after Herbert Kitchener, 1st Earl Kitchener, a British field marshal. The first referendum vote in May, to change the name from Berlin, was characterized by the historian Adam Crerar as being influenced by voter intimidation, with soldiers of the 118th Battalion keeping potential name change opponents away from the polls; the referendum passed by a narrow margin. A second referendum in June, to choose the new name, saw the name "Kitchener" chosen with only 346 votes. In September, the city of 19,000 people was renamed.

=== German culture ===
Of the cities that are now part of Waterloo Region, Berlin, now Kitchener, has the strongest German heritage because of the high levels of settlement in this area by German-speaking immigrants.

While those from Pennsylvania were the most numerous until about 1840, a few Germans from Europe began arriving in 1819, including Fredrick Gaukel, a hotel keeper, being one of the first. He built what later became the Walper House in Berlin. Two streets in present-day Kitchener, Frederick and Gaukel Streets, are named after him. Other German-speaking immigrants from Europe arrived during the 1830s to 1850s, bringing with them their language, religion, and cultural traditions. The German community became industrial and political leaders, and created a German-Canadian society unlike any other found in Canada at the time. They established German public schools and German-language churches.

Both the immigrants from Germany and the Mennonites from Pennsylvania spoke German, though with different dialects such as Low German or the incorrectly called Pennsylvania Dutch, actually Pennsilfaanisch Deitsch (German, not modern Dutch). (This dialect is different from Standard German with a simplified grammatical structure, some differences in vocabulary and pronunciation and a greater influence of English.) The combination of various types of German-speaking groups was a notable factor in the history of Waterloo County. The two groups spoke similar dialects and were able to understand each other quite easily and there was no apparent conflict between the Germans from Europe and those who came from Pennsylvania.

Some sources estimate that roughly 50,000 Germans directly from Europe settled in and around Waterloo County, between the 1830s and 1850s. Unlike the predominantly Mennonite settlers from Pennsylvania, the majority of Germans from Europe were of other denominations: most in the first groups were Catholic and those who arrived later were primarily Lutheran.

In 1862, German-speaking groups held the Sängerfest, or "Singer Festival" concert event in Berlin that attracted an estimated 10,000 people and continued for several years. Eleven years later, the more than 2000 Germans in Berlin, Ontario, started a new event, Friedensfest, commemorating Prussian victory in the Franco-Prussian War. This annual celebration continued until the start of World War I. In 1897, they raised funds to erect a large monument, with a bronze bust of Kaiser Wilhelm I, in Victoria Park. The monument was destroyed by townspeople just after the start of World War I. A statue of Queen Victoria was erected in the park in 1911.

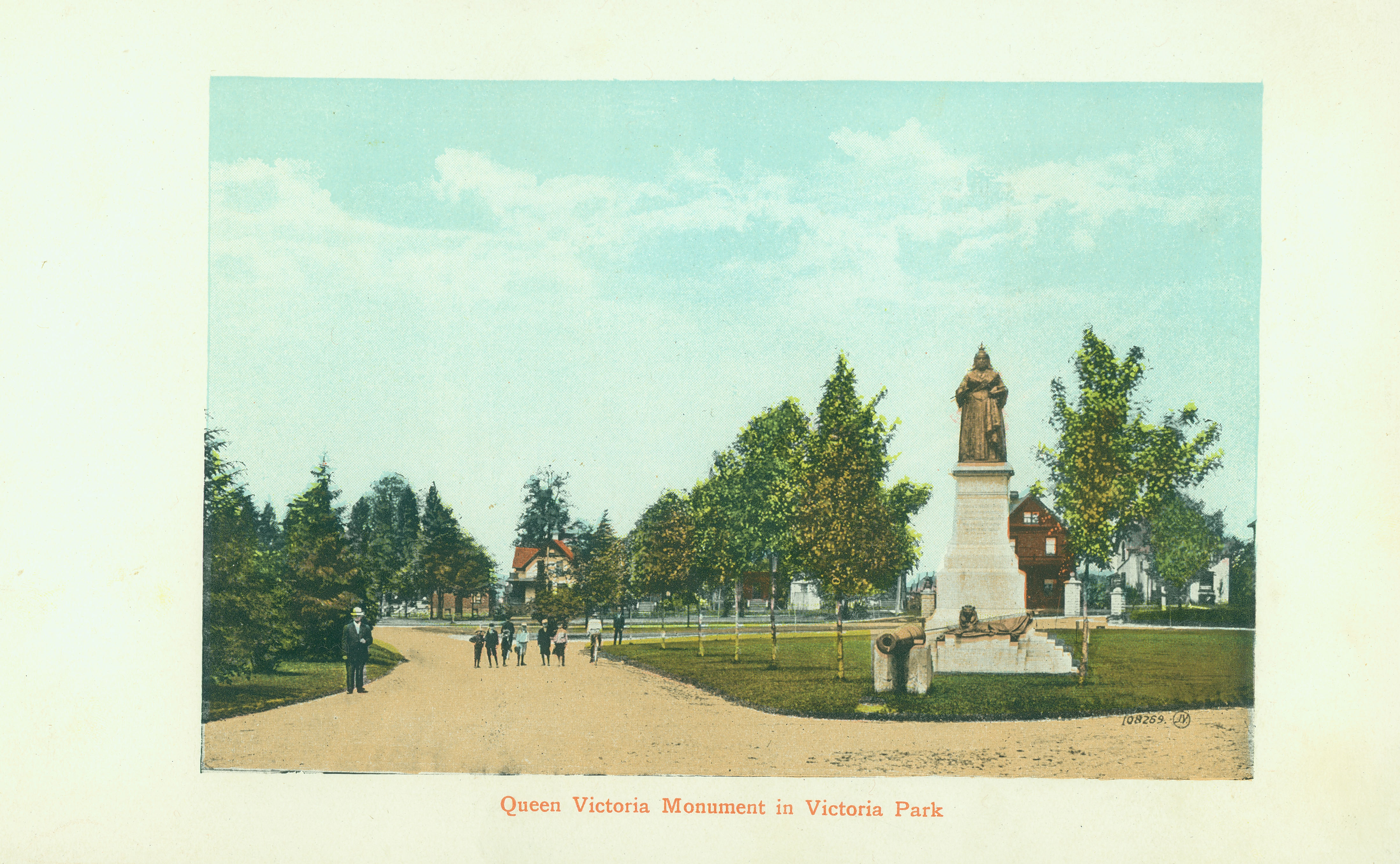
Queen Victoria Monument

By 1871, Berlin, Ontario, was a bilingual town with German being the dominant language spoken. More than one visitor commented on the necessity of speaking German in Berlin.

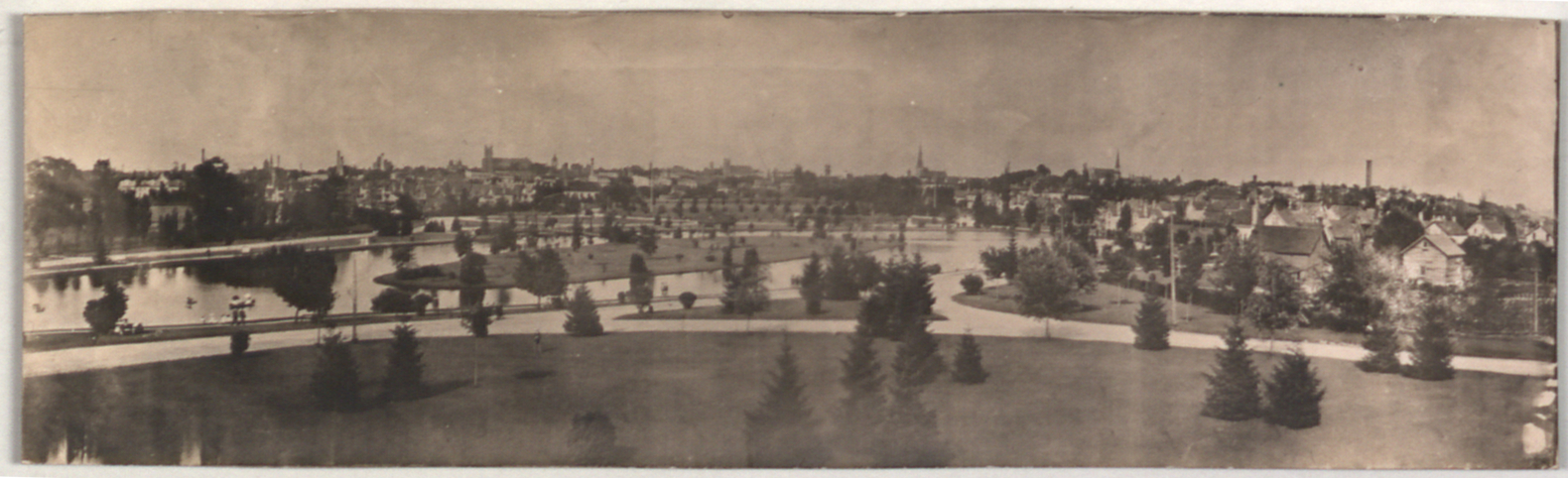
Victoria Park, Berlin, Ontario, 1906

Immigration from continental Germany slowed by 1880. First and second-generation descendants now comprised most of the local German population, and while they were proud of their German roots, most considered themselves loyal British subjects. The 1911 Census indicates that of the 15,196 residents in Berlin, Ontario, about 70% were identified as ethnic German but only 8.3% had been born in Germany. By the beginning of the First World War in 1914, Berlin and Waterloo County were still considered to be predominantly German by people across Canada. This would prove to have a profound impact on local citizens during the war years. During the first few months of the war, services and activities at Lutheran churches in Waterloo County continued. As anti-German sentiment increased throughout Waterloo County, many of the churches decided to stop holding services in German.

The governor general of Canada, the Duke of Connaught, while visiting Berlin, Ontario, in May 1914, discussed the importance of Canadians of German ethnicity (regardless of their origin) in a speech: "It is of great interest to me that many of the citizens of Berlin are of German descent. I well know the admirable qualities – the thoroughness, the tenacity, and the loyalty of the great Teutonic Race, to which I am so closely related. I am sure that these inherited qualities will go far in the making of good Canadians and loyal citizens of the British Empire".

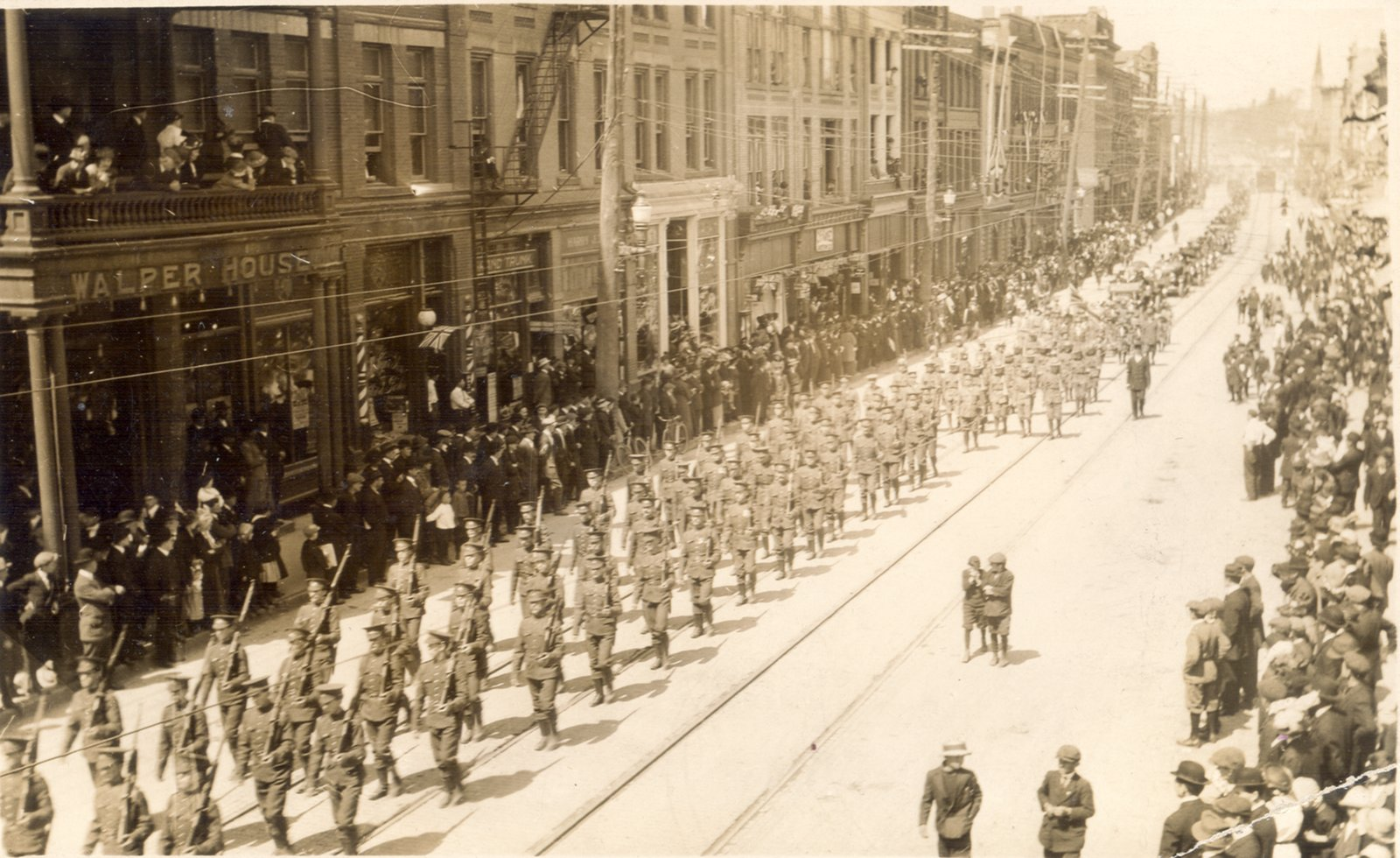
Military parade down King Street in Berlin.

In 1897, a large bronze bust of Kaiser Wilhelm I, made by Reinhold Begas and shipped from Germany, was installed at Victoria Park, Kitchener to honour the region's prominent German-Canadian population. It was removed and thrown into the lake by vandals in August 1914 at the beginning of the First World War. The bust was recovered from the lake and moved to the nearby Concordia club, but it was stolen again February 15, 1916, marched through the streets by a mob, made up largely of soldiers from the 118th Battalion, and has never been seen again. The 118th Battalion is rumoured to have melted down the bust to make napkin rings given to its members. A monument with a plaque outlining the story of the original bust was erected in 1996 in the location of the original bust and its stand.

As the incidents with the bust suggest, there was certainly some anti-German sentiment in Canada. Some immigrants from Germany who considered themselves Canadians but were not yet citizens, were detained in internment camps. There were some cultural sanctions on German communities in Canada, and that included Berlin. However, by 1919 most of the population of what would become Kitchener, Waterloo and Elmira were "Canadian"; over 95 percent had been born in Ontario. Those of the Mennonite religion were pacifists so they could not enlist, and the few who had immigrated from Germany (not born in Canada) could not morally fight against a country that was a significant part of their heritage. The anti-German sentiment was the primary reason for the Berlin to Kitchener name change in 1916. News reports indicate that "A Lutheran minister was pulled out of his house ... he was dragged through the streets. German clubs were ransacked through the course of the war. It was just a really nasty time period." Someone stole the bust of Kaiser Wilhelm from Victoria Park; soldiers vandalized German stores and ransacked Berlin's ethnic clubs. History professor Mark Humphries summarized the situation:

Before the war, most people in Ontario probably didn't give the German community a second thought. But it is important to remember that Canada was a society in transition – the country had absorbed massive numbers of immigrants between 1896 and the First World War, proportionately more than at any other time in our history. So there were these latent fears about foreigners ... It becomes very easy to stoke these racist, nativist fires and convince people there really is a threat. War propaganda is top-down driven, but it is effective because it re-enforces tendencies that already exist.

A document in the Archives of Canada makes the following comment: "Although ludicrous to modern eyes, the whole issue of a name for Berlin highlights the effects that fear, hatred and nationalism can have upon a society in the face of war."

The Waterloo Pioneer Memorial Tower built in 1926 commemorates the settlement by the Pennsylvania 'Dutch' (actually Pennsilfaanisch Deitsch, or German) of the Grand River area of Waterloo County. The Kitchener–Waterloo Oktoberfest is a remembrance of the region's German heritage. The event includes beer halls and German entertainment. The second largest Oktoberfest in the world, the event is based on the original German Oktoberfest and is billed as "Canada's Greatest Bavarian Festival". It attracts an average of 700,000 people to the county. During the 2016 Oktoberfest parade, an estimated 150,000 people lined the streets along the route. Granted, some do not consider Oktoberfest to be indicative of German culture in general. "The fact is, Oktoberfest in Germany is a very localized festival. It really is a Munich festival. ... [Oktoberfest in Kitchener] celebrates only a 'tiny aspect' of German culture [Bavarian]", according to German studies professor James Skidmore of the University of Waterloo.

=== Suburban development (20th century) ===
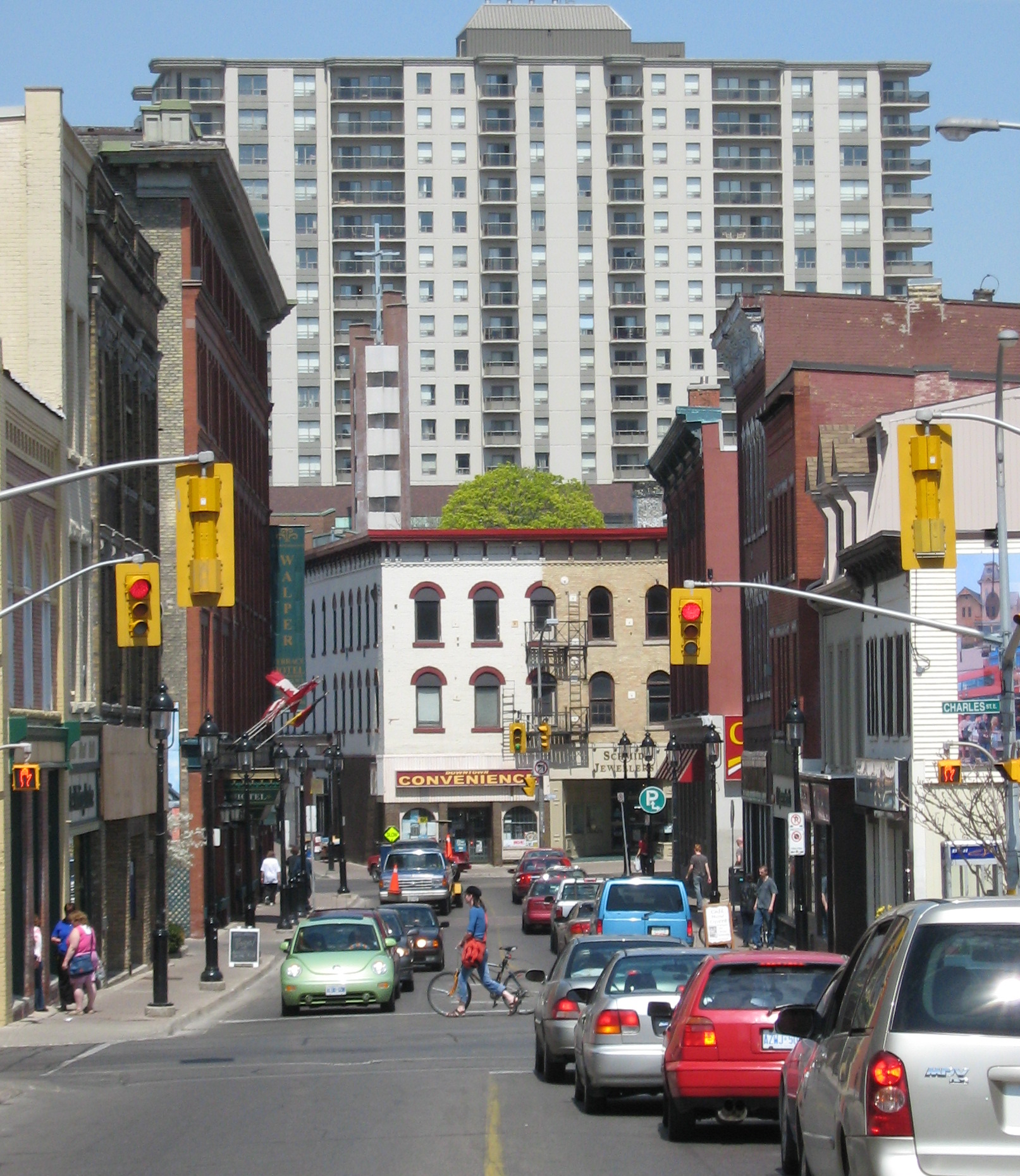
Queen Street South, looking north to King Street

The interwar and postwar periods saw a wave of suburban development around the city. One prominent example of this was the Westmount neighbourhood. Modelled after the affluent Montreal suburb of the same name, it was developed on the forested hills to the north of the Schneider farmstead on lands that were subdivided from it. Kitchener's Westmount took a number of its street names from the model subdivision in Montreal, such as Belmont Avenue. It was the brainchild of a local rubber magnate, Talmon Henry Rieder, who was heavily connected to Montreal business interests and who oversaw the 1912 construction of the Dominion Tire Plant on nearby Strange Street. Rieder was inspired by the turn-of-the-century City Beautiful movement, which was focused in large part on construction of monumental civic architecture and urban beautification; it is often associated with Beaux-Arts architecture in North America.

Rieder's own interpretation of the movement's philosophy followed a variation of the influential landscape architect Frederick Law Olmsted's "Suburb Beautiful", with Rieder proclaiming Westmount the "Development Beautiful". It reflected an alienation from industrial cities and dense urban centres, driven by a variety of factors. These included concerns around the health impact of air pollution and desire for "country air"; the ability for people to commute longer distances being enabled by motor vehicles; the availability of large, cheap plots of development land; an increasing emphasis on the "restricted residential subdivision" and restrictive covenants barring industrial and commercial development in exclusive residential neighbourhoods (an antecedent to modern zoning); and a desire by Berlin-turned-Kitchener's ethnically German business class, in the wake of the city's turmoil over its German identity during the First World War, to distance themselves from its 19th century past and the downtown area associated with it in favour of a built environment similar to wealthy Anglo-Canadians in other Canadian cities, such as Montreal and Winnipeg. The fortunes of Rieder and other rubber industrialists were linked to the rise of the automobile industry in Canada, and indirectly to the growth of automobile-linked suburbs. Lands formerly in the rural Waterloo Township were annexed to the city, ensuring suburban access to municipal services. Westmount's planners distinguished the suburb from Kitchener's urban core in fundamental ways, such as the adoption of wandering, curvilinear roads combined with a more traditionally urban grid pattern. Many streets were originally intended to be wide boulevards, with some, such as Union Boulevard, planned to be as wide as 80 feet (24 m). Winding streets and picturesque vistas were a significant part of advertising for the subdivision.

== Economy ==
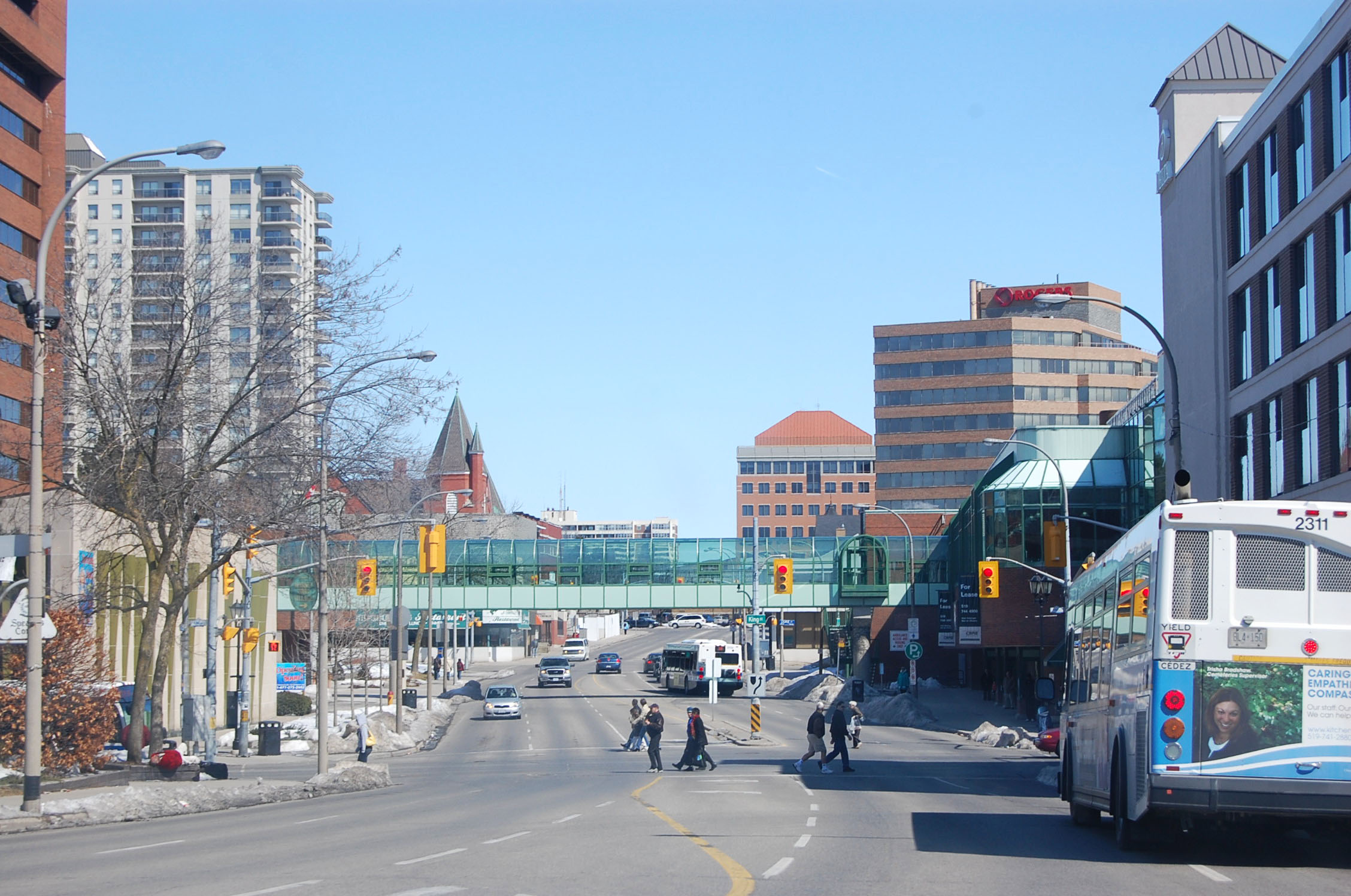
Benton and Frederick Streets (the name changes at the intersection with King Street in the foreground) form one of the most important corridors for traffic and public transit routes entering Downtown Kitchener.

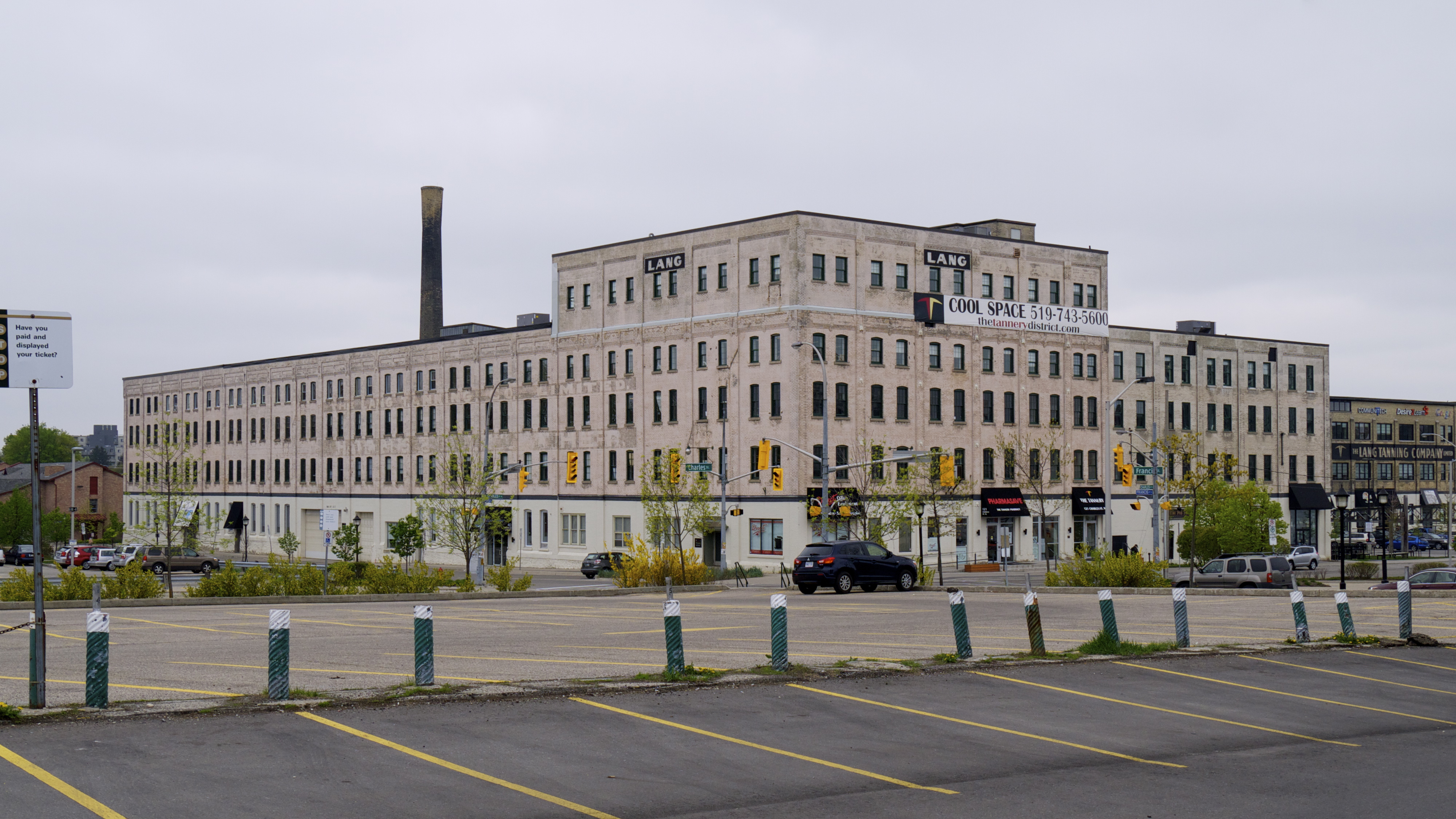
Former Lang Tannery building, now used as hub for digital media companies

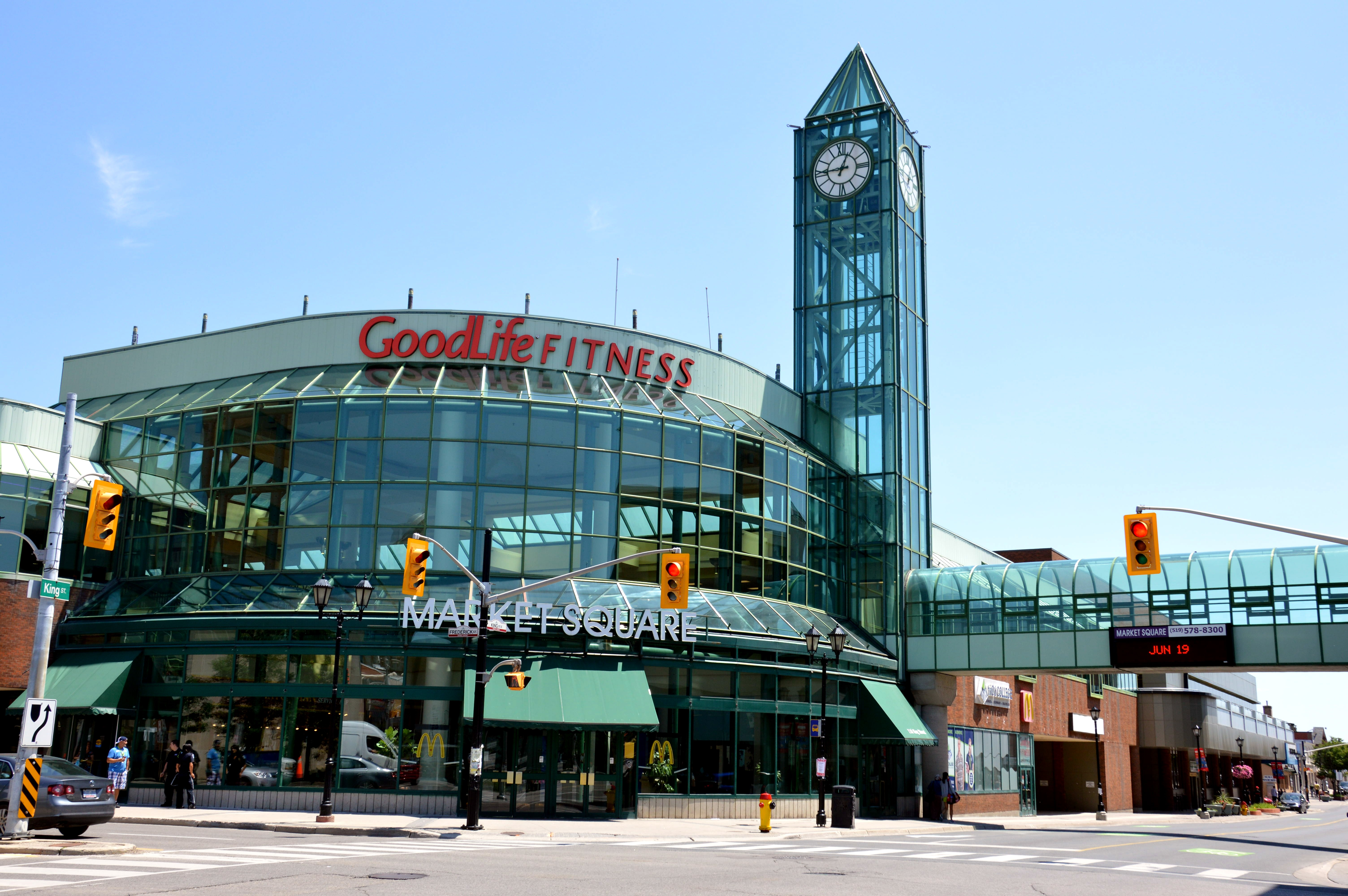
Market Square, on the corner of Frederick St. and King St. East

Kitchener's economic heritage is rooted in manufacturing. Industrial artifacts are in public places throughout the city as a celebration of its manufacturing history. While the local economy's reliance on manufacturing has decreased, in 2012, 20.36% of the labour force was employed in the manufacturing sector.

The city is home to four municipal business parks: the Bridgeport Business Park, Grand River West Business Park, Huron Business Park and Lancaster Corporate Centre. The largest, the Huron Business Park, is home to a number of industries, from seat manufacturers to furniture components. Some of the notable companies headquartered in Kitchener include: Waterloo Brewing Company, D2L, Vidyard, and ApplyBoard.

Kitchener's economy has diversified to include new high-value economic clusters. In addition to Kitchener's internationally recognized finance and insurance and manufacturing clusters, digital media and health science clusters are emerging within the city.

Beginning in 2004, the City of Kitchener launched several initiatives to re-energize the downtown core. These initiatives included heavy investment, on behalf of the city and its partners, and the creation of a Downtown Kitchener Action Plan.

The modern incarnation of its historic farmers' market, opened in 2004. The Kitchener Market is one of the oldest consistently operating markets in Canada. The Kitchener Market features local producers, international cuisine, artisans, and craftspeople.

In 2009, the City of Kitchener began a project to reconstruct and revitalize the main street in Kitchener's downtown core, King Street. In the reconstruction of King Street, several features were added to make the street more friendly to pedestrians. New lighting was added to the street, sidewalks were widened, and curbs were lowered. Movable bollards were installed to add flexibility to the streetscape, accommodating main street events and festivals. In 2010, the redesigned King Street was awarded the International Community Places Award for its flexible design intended to draw people into the downtown core. In 2009, Tree Canada recognized King Street as a green street. The redesigned King Street features several environmentally sustainable elements such as new street trees, bike racks, planter beds that collect and filter storm water, street furnishing made primarily from recycled materials, and an improved waste management system. The street was reconstructed using recycled roadway and paving stones. In September 2012, the City of Toronto government used Kitchener's King Street as a model for Celebrate Yonge – a month-long event which reduced Yonge Street to two lanes, widening sidewalks to improve the commercial street for businesses and pedestrians.

The groundbreaking ceremony for the University of Waterloo School of Pharmacy and downtown health sciences campus took place on 15 March 2006, and the facility opened in spring 2009. The building is on King Street near Victoria Street, on the site of the old Epton plant, across the street from the Kaufman Lofts (formerly the Kaufman shoe factory). McMaster University later opened a satellite campus for its Michael G. DeGroote School of Medicine next to the University of Waterloo's School of Pharmacy. The Health Sciences Campus has been central to the emergence of Kitchener's health science cluster.

In 2007, Cadan Inc., a Toronto-based real estate development company, bought what had been the Lang Tannery for $10 million. Supported by the local government, Cadan repurposed the building for use by commercial firms. Since its refurbishment, the Tannery has become a hub for digital media companies, both large and small. Desire2Learn, an e-learning company, in the Tannery as the company expanded. In 2011, Communitech moved into the Tannery. Home to over 800 companies, Communitech is a hub for innovative high-tech companies in the fields of information technology, digital media, biomedical, aerospace, environmental technology and advanced manufacturing. Also in 2011, high-tech giant Google Inc. became a tenant of the Tannery, furthering its reputation as a home for leading high-tech companies. The Kitchener office is a large hub for the development for Google's Gmail application. In 2016, the University of Waterloo-sponsored startup hub Velocity Garage relocated to the building, bringing over 100 additional startup companies into the Tannery.

The Province of Ontario built a new provincial courthouse in downtown Kitchener, on the block bordered by Frederick, Duke, Scott and Weber streets. The new courthouse was expected to create new jobs, mainly for the courthouse, but also for other businesses, especially law offices. The new courthouse construction began in 2010.

In the downtown area, several factories have been transformed into upscale lofts and residences. In September 2010, construction began on the 'City Centre' redevelopment project in downtown Kitchener. This redevelopment project will include condominium units, new retail spaces, private and public parking, a gallery, and a boutique hotel. The former Arrow shirt factory has been converted into a luxury, high-rise apartment building, featuring loft condominiums.

In 2012, Desire2Learn, in downtown Kitchener, received $80 million in venture capitalist funding from OMERS Ventures and New Enterprise Associates.

The downtown area was in a boom phase by late 2017, with $1.2 billion in building permits for 20 new developments expected by the end of February 2019. That would add 1,000 apartments and 1,800 condominium units. The City indicated that the development would be a "mixture of high-density residential buildings with ground-floor retail, and office buildings with ground-floor retail". Since the Ion rapid transit (light rail) system, operated by Grand River Transit, was approved in 2009, "the region has issued $2.4 billion in building permits within the LRT corridor".

== Demographics ==
Historical population
Year	Pop.	±%
1871	3,473	—
1881	4,054	+16.7%
1891	7,245	+78.7%
1901	9,747	+34.5%
1911	15,196	+55.9%
1921	21,763	+43.2%
1931	30,793	+41.5%
1941	35,657	+15.8%
1951	44,867	+25.8%
1956	60,916	+35.8%
1961	74,485	+22.3%
1966	94,446	+26.8%
1971	111,805	+18.4%
1976	131,870	+17.9%
1981	139,734	+6.0%
1986	150,604	+7.8%
1991	168,282	+11.7%
2001	190,399	+13.1%
2006	204,688	+7.5%
2011	219,153	+7.1%
2016	233,222	+6.4%
2021	256,855	+10.1%

Ethnic origin	Population	Percent
German	51,050	17.7
English	48,350	15.9
Irish	37,630	13.7
Scottish	37,190	13
Canadian	54,490	11.5
French	20,790	6.1
East Indian	8,385	5.6
Polish	12,595	4.5
Dutch	9,815	3.7
British	8,805	3.5
Italian	7,620	3
Portuguese	6,225	2.4
Chinese	5,630	2.2
Ukrainian	5,540	2.2
Source: StatCan (includes multiple responses)

In the 2021 Census of Population conducted by Statistics Canada, Kitchener had a population of 256,885 living in 99,812 of its 103,388 total private dwellings, a change of 10.1% from its 2016 population of 233,222. With a land area of 136.81 km^{2} (52.82 sq mi), it had a population density of 1,877.7/km^{2} (4,863.2/sq mi) in 2021.

At the census metropolitan area (CMA) level in the 2021 census, the Kitchener - Cambridge - Waterloo CMA had a population of 575,847 living in 219,060 of its 229,809 total private dwellings, a change of 9.9% from its 2016 population of 523,894. With a land area of 1,092.33 km^{2} (421.75 sq mi), it had a population density of 527.2/km^{2} (1,365.4/sq mi) in 2021.

=== Ethnicity ===
According to the 2021 Census, Kitchener is approximately 66.4% White, 31.7% visible minorities, and 1.9% Aboriginal. Visible minorities include: 9.9% South Asian, 6.9% Black, 3.1% Latin American, 3.7% Southeast Asian, 1.8% Chinese, 2.4% Arab, 1.3% West Asian, and 1.1% Filipino.

The most common ethnicities in Kitchener as per the 2021 census are German (17.7%), English (15.9%), Irish (13.7%), Scottish (13%), Canadian (11.5%), French (6.1%), East Indian (5.6%), Polish (4.5%), Dutch (3.7%), British (3.5%), Italian (3%), Portuguese (2.4%), Chinese (2.2%), and Ukrainian (2.2%).

Largest ethnic origin in Kitchener - Cambridge - Waterloo CMA by census tract based on the 2021 census

Panethnic groups in the City of Kitchener (2001−2021)
Panethnic group	2021		2016		2011		2006		2001	
Panethnic group	Pop.	%	Pop.	%	Pop.	%	Pop.	%	Pop.	%
European (Note: Statistic includes all persons that did not make up part of a visible minority or an indigenous identity.)	168,865	66.44%	175,400	76.26%	173,075	80.15%	168,445	83.32%	164,455	87.4%
South Asian	25,170	9.9%	11,400	4.96%	8,960	4.15%	6,360	3.15%	4,255	2.26%
African	17,510	6.89%	9,540	4.15%	6,635	3.07%	6,395	3.16%	4,165	2.21%
Southeast Asian (Note: Statistic includes total responses of "Filipino" and "Southeast Asian" under visible minority section on census.)	9,455	3.72%	6,765	2.94%	6,380	2.95%	4,785	2.37%	4,200	2.23%
Middle Eastern (Note: Statistic includes total responses of "West Asian" and "Arab" under visible minority section on census.)	9,395	3.7%	6,840	2.97%	5,070	2.35%	3,550	1.76%	1,980	1.05%
Latin American	7,795	3.07%	5,915	2.57%	5,735	2.66%	4,510	2.23%	3,260	1.73%
East Asian (Note: Statistic includes total responses of "Chinese", "Korean", and "Japanese" under visible minority section on census.)	6,235	2.45%	6,085	2.65%	4,845	2.24%	3,710	1.84%	2,410	1.28%
Indigenous	4,795	1.89%	4,405	1.92%	3,155	1.46%	2,485	1.23%	1,875	1%
Other/Multiracial (Note: Statistic includes total responses of "Visible minority, n.i.e." and "Multiple visible minorities" under visible minority section on census.)	4,920	1.94%	3,650	1.59%	2,100	0.97%	1,920	0.95%	1,550	0.82%
Total responses	254,145	98.93%	230,005	98.62%	215,950	98.54%	202,160	98.77%	188,160	98.82%
Total population	256,885	100%	233,222	100%	219,153	100%	204,668	100%	190,399	100%
Note: Totals greater than 100% due to multiple origin responses

=== Religion ===
According to the 2021 census, religious groups in Kitchener included:

Religious Affiliation in Kitchener
Religion	Population	Percent
Christianity	131,390	51.7
Irreligion	81,475	32.1
Islam	19,140	7.5
Hinduism	9,610	3.8
Sikhism	6,520	2.6
Buddhism	3,015	1.2
Judaism	525	0.2
Indigenous Spirituality	70	<0.1
Other	2400	0.9

According to the 2021 census, 51.7% of the population identify as Christian, with the largest denomination of Christianity being Catholics (22.3%), followed by Orthodox (4.3%), Lutherans (3%), Anglican (2.4%), United Church (2.3%), Pentecostal (1.6%), Presbyterian (1.4%), Baptist (1.4%), and other denominations. Others identify as Muslim (7.5%), Hindu (3.8%), Sikh (2.6%), Buddhist (1.2%), Judaism (0.2%), Indigenous Spirituality (<0.1%), other religious affiliation (0.9%), and 32.1% of the population reported being Irreligious.

Largest non-Christian religion in Kitchener - Cambridge - Waterloo CMA by census tract based on the 2021 census

== Government ==
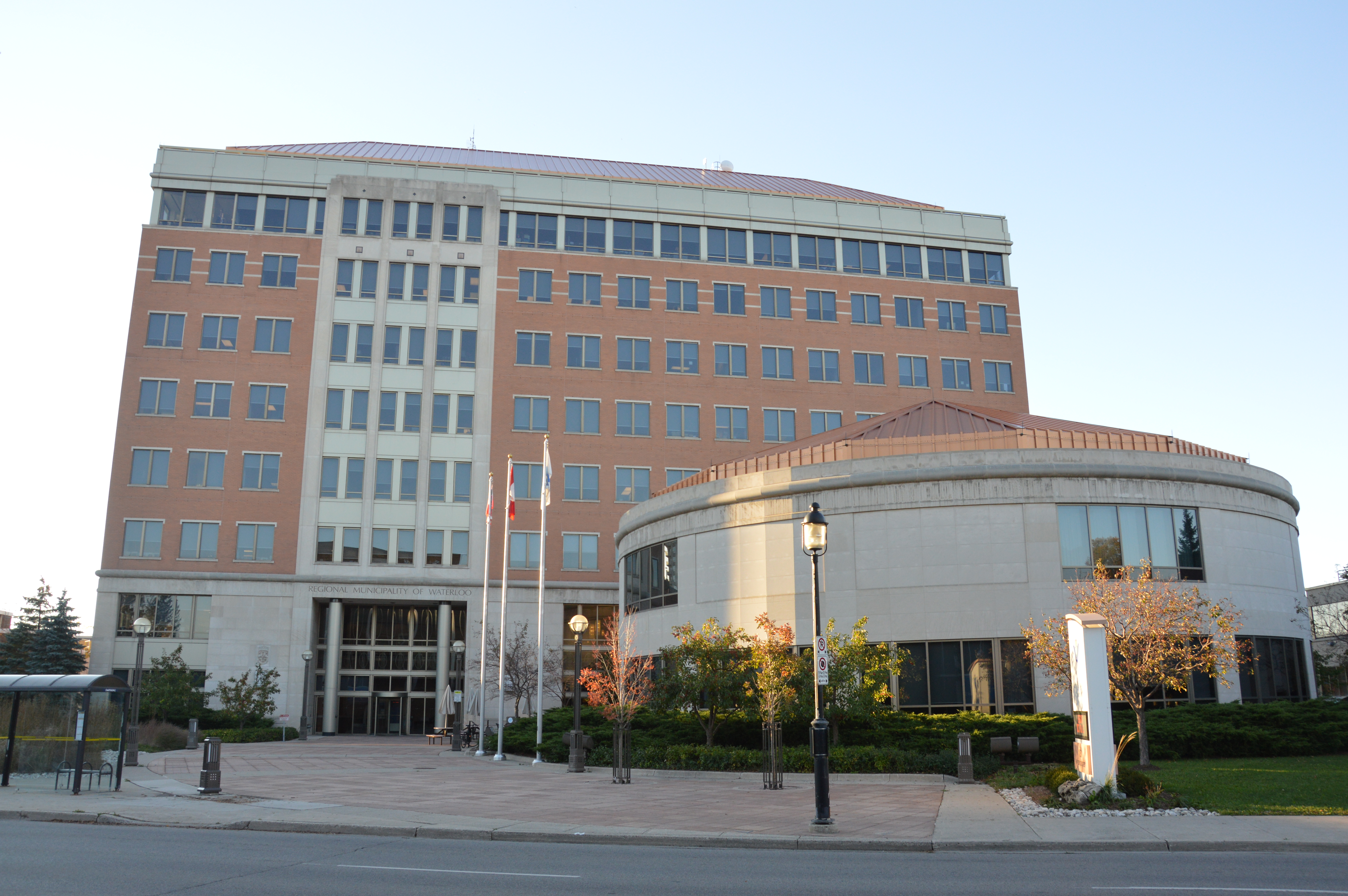
Region of Waterloo Headquarters in Kitchener

Kitchener is governed by a council of ten councillors, representing wards (or districts), and a mayor. Council is responsible for policy and decision making, monitoring the operation and performance of the city, analyzing and approving budgets and determining spending priorities. The residents of each ward vote for one person to be their city councillor; their voice and representative on city council. Municipal elections are held every four years in late October.

Kitchener was part of Waterloo County until 1973 when amalgamation created the Regional Municipality of Waterloo. The region handles many services, including fire, police, waste management, community health, transit, recreation, planning, roads and social services.

Kitchener residents elect four councillors at large to sit with the mayor on the Regional council.

The mayor of Kitchener is Berry Vrbanovic, who was elected to his first term in October 2014. See Kitchener City Council for a complete list of councillors.

In 1976, residents of Kitchener voted almost 2:1 in favour of a ward system. The first municipal election held under the ward system occurred in 1978. In 2010, the city underwent a ward boundary review. A consultant proposed boundaries for a 10-ward system for the 2010 municipal election, adding 4 additional councillors and wards to replace the previous 6-ward system.

Kitchener federal election results
Year	Liberal		Conservative		New Democratic		Green	
2021	29%	32,496	29%	32,286	16%	18,062	18%	20,057
2019	40%	47,458	28%	33,196	12%	14,180	18%	20,676

Kitchener provincial election results
Year	PC		New Democratic		Liberal		Green	
2022	33%	26,354	35%	28,145	16%	12,954	11%	8,861
2018	32%	31,876	42%	41,096	18%	17,289	7%	6,621

The Member of Provincial Parliament (MPP) for Kitchener Centre is Aislinn Clancy. Other MPPs include Mike Harris Jr. (Kitchener-Conestoga) and Catherine Fife (Kitchener–Waterloo) who both represent small portions of the city in addition to adjacent areas. The federal Members of Parliament (MPs) are as follows: Kelly DeRidder (Kitchener Centre), Tim Louis (Kitchener-Conestoga), and Matt Strauss (Kitchener South—Hespeler).

== Geography and climate ==
=== Geography ===
Kitchener is located in Southwestern Ontario, in the Saint Lawrence Lowlands. This geological and climatic region has wet-climate soils and deciduous forests. Situated in the Grand River Valley, the area is generally above 300 m (1,000 ft) in elevation.

Kitchener is the largest city in the Grand River watershed and the Haldimand Tract. Just to the west of the city is Baden Hill, in Wilmot Township. This glacial kame remnant formation is the highest elevation for many miles. The other dominant glacial feature is the Waterloo Moraine, which snakes its way through the region, and holds a significant quantity of artesian wells, from which the city derives most of its drinking water. The settlement's first name, Sandhills, is an accurate description of the higher points of the moraine.

=== Climate ===
Kitchener has a humid continental climate of the warm summer subtype (Dfb under the Köppen climate classification); large seasonal differences are seen, usually warm and humid summers and cold to occasionally very cold winters. Winter-like conditions generally last from mid-December until mid-March, while summer temperatures generally occur from mid-May to close to the end of September.

March 2012 went down in the history books for Kitchener – between 16 and 22 March, temperatures ranged from 21.4 °C (70.5 °F) to 26.5 °C (79.7 °F)—7 record highs in a row. 19 March high of 24 °C (75.2 °F) is one of the highest winter temperatures ever recorded, while 22 March high of 26.5 °C (79.7 °F) is the highest for March in this area.

Temperatures during the year can exceed 30 °C (86.0 °F) in the summer and drop below −20 °C (−4.0 °F) in the winter several times a year, but prolonged periods of extreme temperatures are rare. The frost-free period for Kitchener averages about 147 frost-free days a year, a much lower number than cities on the Great Lakes due its inland location and higher elevation. Snowfall averages 160 centimetres (63 in) per year.

The highest temperature ever recorded in Kitchener was 38.3 °C (101 °F) on August 6 and 7, 1918, and again on July 27, 1941. The coldest temperature ever recorded was −34.1 °C (−29.4 °F) on February 16, 2015.

The record high daily minimum temperature was 25.7 °C (78.3 °F) on August 6, 2002. The record high dew point was 27.7 °C (81.9 °F) on August 4, 1988. The most humid month was July 1987 with a monthly average dew point of 17.5 °C (63.5 °F). The warmest month was August 1969 with a monthly average mean temperature of 23.6 °C (74.5 °F). The month with the warmest average daily maximums was July 2012 with an average monthly daily maximum of 30.0 °C (86.0 °F). The month with the warmest average daily minimums was July 1969 with an average monthly daily maximum of 17.2 °C (63.0 °F), with no daily minimum temperature below 12.2 °C (54.0 °F) during the entire month. July 2011 recorded no daily maximum temperature below 25.5 °C (77.9 °F) during the entire month. July 2024 and August 1996 recorded no dew point below 9.0 °C (48.2 °F) throughout the month.

Summer 1982 recorded the lowest yearly maximum temperature of 29.6 °C (85.3 °F). Summer 2023 recorded the lowest yearly maximum daily minimum temperature of 18.3 °C (64.9 °F). Summer 1992 recorded the lowest yearly maximum dew point of 21.7 °C (71.1 °F).

The average yearly maximum dew point is 23.6 °C (74.5 °F), and the average yearly maximum daily minimum temperature is 21.4 °C (70.5 °F).

Kitchener

Climate chart (precipitation, max. and min. temperature)
J	F	M	A	M	J	J	A	S	O	N	D
66 −2 −10	46 −1 −10	57 4 −6	81 12 0	80 19 6	81 24 12	96 27 14	67 26 13	75 22 9	71 14 3	75 7 −2	55 1 −6
- █ Average max. and min. temperatures in °C
- █ Precipitation totals in mm
- Source: Environment Canada
Imperial conversion
J	F	M	A	M	J	J	A	S	O	N	D
2.6 28 13	1.8 29 13	2.2 39 22	3.2 53 32	3.2 66 43	3.2 75 53	3.8 80 57	2.6 78 55	3 71 48	2.8 57 38	2.9 44 29	2.2 33 21
- █ Average max. and min. temperatures in °F
- █ Precipitation totals in inches

Climate data for Region of Waterloo International Airport, 1991–2020 normals, extremes 1914–present (Note: Daily maximum and minimum temperatures and precipitation were recorded at Kitchener from October 1914 to December 1977 and at Region of Waterloo International Airport from March 1970 to present.)
Month	Jan	Feb	Mar	Apr	May	Jun	Jul	Aug	Sep	Oct	Nov	Dec	Year
Record high °C (°F)	14.9 (58.8)	16.8 (62.2)	26.5 (79.7)	30.0 (86.0)	33.3 (91.9)	36.7 (98.1)	38.3 (100.9)	38.3 (100.9)	36.7 (98.1)	31.1 (88.0)	25.0 (77.0)	18.7 (65.7)	38.3 (100.9)
Mean maximum °C (°F)	9.0 (48.2)	8.2 (46.8)	16.5 (61.7)	23.3 (73.9)	28.9 (84.0)	31.5 (88.7)	32.1 (89.8)	31.2 (88.2)	29.9 (85.8)	24.7 (76.5)	16.8 (62.2)	10.5 (50.9)	33.2 (91.8)
Mean daily maximum °C (°F)	−2.3 (27.9)	−1.4 (29.5)	4.1 (39.4)	11.6 (52.9)	19.0 (66.2)	24.1 (75.4)	26.6 (79.9)	25.5 (77.9)	21.6 (70.9)	14.1 (57.4)	6.8 (44.2)	0.7 (33.3)	12.5 (54.5)
Daily mean °C (°F)	−6.3 (20.7)	−5.9 (21.4)	−0.8 (30.6)	5.9 (42.6)	12.6 (54.7)	17.8 (64.0)	20.2 (68.4)	19.1 (66.4)	15.2 (59.4)	8.8 (47.8)	2.6 (36.7)	−2.8 (27.0)	7.2 (45.0)
Mean daily minimum °C (°F)	−10.3 (13.5)	−10.3 (13.5)	−5.6 (21.9)	0.1 (32.2)	6.2 (43.2)	11.5 (52.7)	13.7 (56.7)	12.7 (54.9)	8.7 (47.7)	3.4 (38.1)	−1.6 (29.1)	−6.3 (20.7)	1.9 (35.4)
Mean minimum °C (°F)	−22.2 (−8.0)	−22.4 (−8.3)	−17.0 (1.4)	−6.7 (19.9)	−1.0 (30.2)	4.6 (40.3)	7.5 (45.5)	6.4 (43.5)	1.1 (34.0)	−4.2 (24.4)	−10.4 (13.3)	−16.9 (1.6)	−25.0 (−13.0)
Record low °C (°F)	−31.9 (−25.4)	−34.1 (−29.4)	−29.4 (−20.9)	−17.8 (0.0)	−6.1 (21.0)	−1.1 (30.0)	4.2 (39.6)	1.1 (34.0)	−3.7 (25.3)	−10.6 (12.9)	−18.9 (−2.0)	−28.3 (−18.9)	−34.1 (−29.4)
Average precipitation mm (inches)	66.3 (2.61)	46.1 (1.81)	57.0 (2.24)	81.2 (3.20)	80.2 (3.16)	80.5 (3.17)	96.2 (3.79)	67.2 (2.65)	75.2 (2.96)	71.0 (2.80)	74.9 (2.95)	54.9 (2.16)	850.6 (33.49)
Average rainfall mm (inches)	28.7 (1.13)	29.7 (1.17)	36.8 (1.45)	68.0 (2.68)	81.8 (3.22)	82.4 (3.24)	98.6 (3.88)	83.9 (3.30)	87.8 (3.46)	66.1 (2.60)	75.0 (2.95)	38.0 (1.50)	776.8 (30.58)
Average snowfall cm (inches)	43.7 (17.2)	30.3 (11.9)	26.5 (10.4)	7.3 (2.9)	0.4 (0.2)	0.0 (0.0)	0.0 (0.0)	0.0 (0.0)	0.0 (0.0)	1.4 (0.6)	13.0 (5.1)	37.2 (14.6)	159.7 (62.9)
Average precipitation days (≥ 0.2 mm)	17.7	12.9	13.2	13.5	13.4	12.7	13.2	11.2	12.0	14.7	14.8	15.0	164.0
Average rainy days (≥ 0.2 mm)	5.6	5.0	6.9	11.5	12.4	12.0	10.6	10.7	12.2	13.7	11.6	6.9	118.7
Average snowy days (≥ 0.2 cm)	16.1	11.9	9.0	3.3	0.18	0.0	0.0	0.0	0.0	0.91	6.5	14.4	62.2
Average relative humidity (%) (at 0600 LST)	86.4	83.4	84.8	84.4	84.7	87.0	90.1	93.6	94.3	90.6	87.6	87.1	87.8
Average dew point °C (°F)	−8.5 (16.7)	−8.6 (16.5)	−4.9 (23.2)	0.1 (32.2)	7.0 (44.6)	12.7 (54.9)	15.0 (59.0)	14.8 (58.6)	11.4 (52.5)	5.4 (41.7)	−0.1 (31.8)	−4.9 (23.2)	3.3 (37.9)
Source 1: Environment Canada (rainfall/snowfall/humidity 1981–2010)
Source 2: weatherstats.ca (for dewpoint and monthly&yearly average absolute maximum&minimum temperature)

== Education ==
Kitchener has several public high schools, with Kitchener–Waterloo Collegiate and Vocational School, founded in 1855, being the oldest. It is located on King Street in the northern area of the city, not far from the boundary of Waterloo. In the 1950s and 1960s several new high schools were constructed, including Eastwood Collegiate Institute in 1956 in what was then southeastern Kitchener, Forest Heights C.I. in 1964 in the western Forest Heights neighbourhood, Grand River C.I. in 1967 in the northeastern Heritage Park/Grand River Village area, and Cameron Heights C.I. in 1967 in the southern Downtown core. In 2006, Huron Heights Secondary School opened in southwestern Kitchener. It opened with a limited enrollment of only 9th and 10th grade students, and has since expanded to full capacity in the 2008–2009 school year.

The oldest Catholic high school in the city is St. Mary's High School, which opened in 1907 as a girls-only Catholic school. It was transformed into a co-ed institution in 1990 after the closure of the neighbouring St. Jerome's High School, which had been a boys-only Catholic school. The same year, a second Catholic high school, Resurrection Catholic Secondary School, opened in the west of the city, replacing St. Jerome's, which had operated from 1864 to 1990. In 2002, St. Mary's moved from its downtown location to a new one in the city's southwest. The former St. Jerome's building now houses the Lyle S. Hallman Faculty of Social Work at Wilfrid Laurier University. It opened at this location in 2006, bringing 300 faculty, staff, and students to downtown Kitchener. The former St. Mary's High School building, meanwhile, has been transformed into both the head office of the Waterloo Catholic District School Board and the Kitchener Downtown Community Centre.

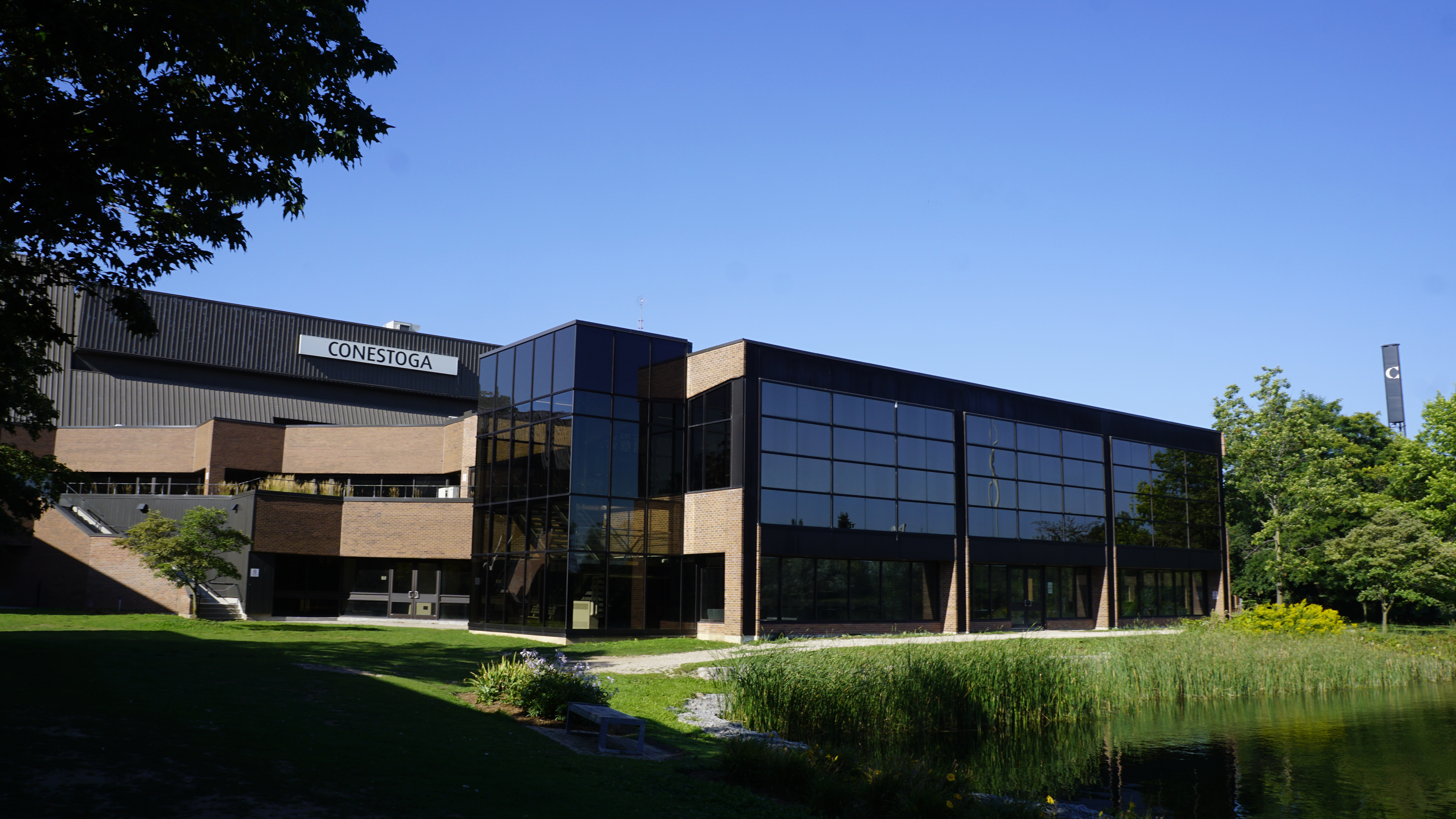
Conestoga College

The Doon neighbourhood, once a separate village, is now part of Kitchener. It is home to the primary campus of Conestoga College, one of the foremost non-university educational institutions in the province. For nine consecutive years, Conestoga has earned top overall ranking among Ontario colleges on the Key Performance Indicator (KPI) surveys, which measure graduate employment rates and satisfaction levels, and employer and student satisfaction. It is one of only seven polytechnical institutes in Canada.

The University of Waterloo opened a School of Pharmacy in the downtown area. The City of Kitchener has contributed $30 million from its $110 million Economic Development Investment Fund, established in 2004, to the establishment of the UW Downtown Kitchener School of Pharmacy. Construction began in 2006, and the pharmacy program was launched in January 2008 with 92 students.

The school is expected to graduate about 120 pharmacists annually and will become the home of the Centre for Family Medicine, where new family physicians will be trained, as well as an optometry clinic and the International Pharmacy Graduate Program. Construction on the $147 million facility was largely finished in spring 2009.

The University of Waterloo's (UW) Downtown Kitchener Health Sciences Campus is also the site of a satellite campus for McMaster University's School of Medicine. The Michael G. DeGroote School of Medicine admits 28 students per year to the MD program at the Waterloo Regional Campus. Students complete their clinical placements at hospitals and medical centres in the Waterloo-Wellington Region. McMaster's satellite campus also features the Centre for Family Medicine, a family health team, and the University of Waterloo's School of Optometry clinic.

Emmanuel Bible College is also in Kitchener, at 100 Fergus Avenue.

== Health care ==
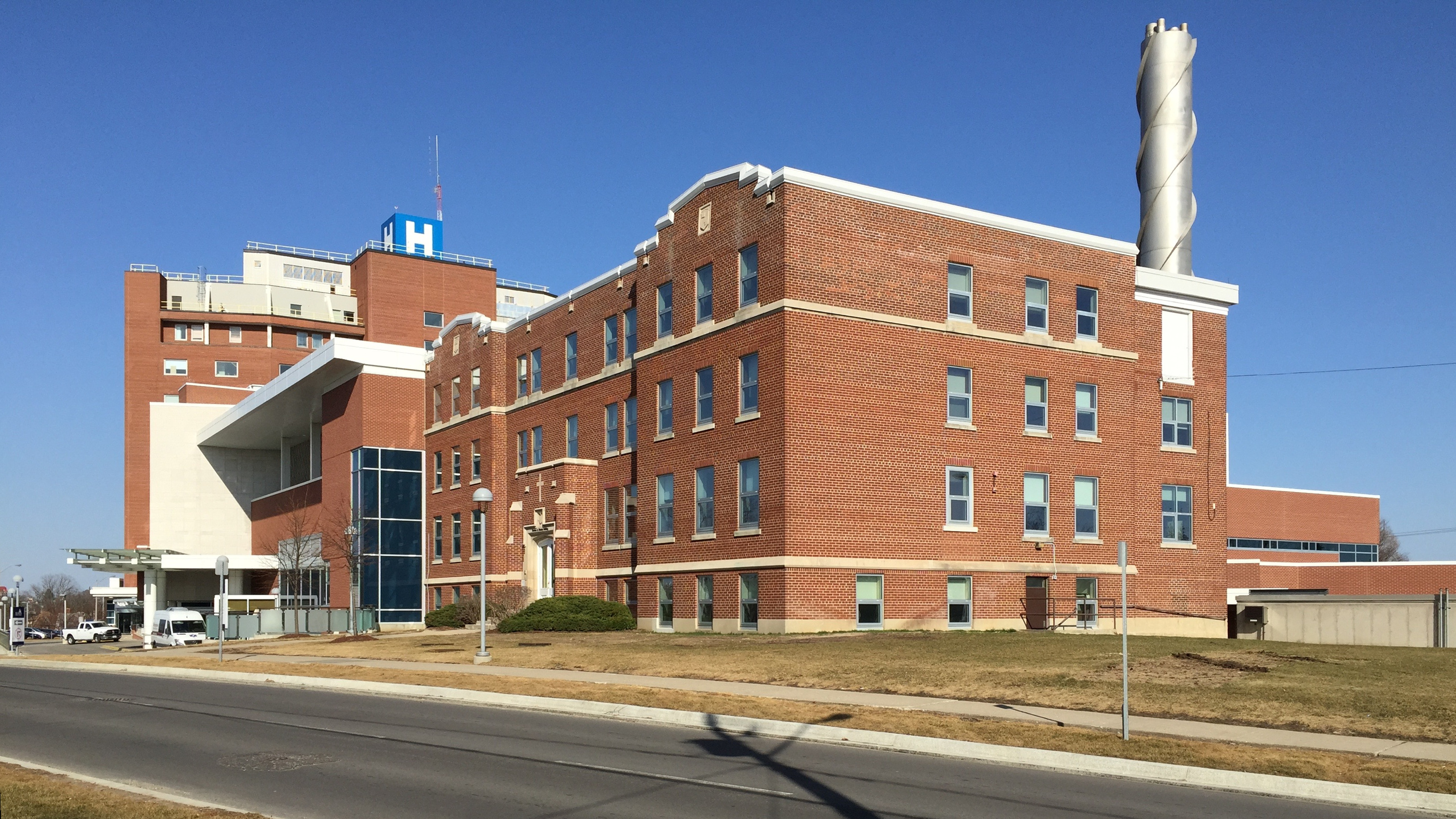
St. Mary's General Hospital

Hospital services are provided by Grand River Hospital which includes a Freeport Campus and St. Mary's General Hospital, both located in Kitchener, as well as Cambridge Memorial Hospital. All three were highly ranked for safety in a national comparison study in 2017–2018, particularly the two located in Kitchener, but all would benefit from reduced wait times. Long-term care beds are provided at numerous facilities.

Grand River Hospital has a capacity of 574-beds; Freeport Health Centre was merged into GRH in April 1995. That secondary campus provides complex continuing care, rehabilitation, longer-term specialized mental health and other services. Built originally as a tuberculosis sanatorium and home for the terminally ill, Freeport also housesthe palliative care unit. The King St. location is also the home of the Grand River Regional Cancer Centre which opened in 2003. St. Mary's General Hospital is a 150-bed adult acute-care facility and includes the Regional Cardiac Care Centre with two cardiovascular operating rooms, an eight-bed cardiovascular intensive care unit and 45 inpatient beds. As of late 2018, Cambridge Memorial had 143 beds but was in the midst of a major expansion expected to be completed in 2021; that will add 54 new beds and double the size of the Emergency department.

Family doctors are often in short supply in K-W, and a source of great concern among residents. Recruiting efforts over the previous 15 years certainly achieved some success as of September 2018, but needed to be continued.

Announced January 2006, as a new School of Medicine, the Waterloo Regional Campus of McMaster University was completed in 2009. In 2018, the campus included "a complete on-site clinical skills laboratory with 4 skills rooms and 2 observation rooms, classrooms with video-conferencing capabilities and a state-of-the-art anatomy lab that was built in 2013 with a high definition video system", according to the university. Its Michael G. DeGroote School of Medicine building includes the Centre for Family Medicine and the University of Waterloo School of Optometry and Vision Science.

== Culture ==
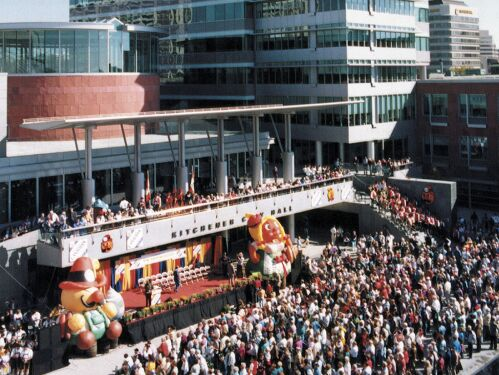
Kitchener is home to the largest Oktoberfest celebration outside of Germany.

Kitchener's cultural highlights include CAFKA, The Open Ears Festival, IMPACT theatre festival, the Multicultural Festival, the Kitchener Blues Festival and KidsPark, many of which are free to the public. Kitchener is also home to venues such as Homer Watson House & Gallery, Kitchener–Waterloo Art Gallery, THEMUSEUM, JM Drama Alumni and Centre In The Square. Regional museums include the Waterloo Regional Children's Museum, Ken Seiling Waterloo Region Museum, and the Doon Heritage Village.

Live music by popular artists can be heard at venues such as Centre In The Square and The Aud. The Kitchener Public Library is another community stalwart. Kitchener is also home to independent music label, Busted Flat Records which features the music of many Kitchener–Waterloo based musicians.

=== Kitchener–Waterloo Oktoberfest ===
Kitchener–Waterloo's Oktoberfest celebration is an annual nine-day event that started in 1969. Based on the original Bavarian Oktoberfest, it is billed as Canada's Greatest Bavarian Festival. It is held every October, starting on the Friday before Canadian Thanksgiving and running until the Saturday after. It is the largest Bavarian festival outside of Germany.

While its best-known draws are the beer-based celebrations, other family and cultural events also fill the week. The best-known is the Oktoberfest Thanksgiving Day Parade held on Thanksgiving Day; as it is the only major parade on Canadian Thanksgiving, it is televised nationally. Another icon of the festival is Miss Oktoberfest. This festival ambassador position is selected by a closed committee of judges from a panel of local applicants; community involvement and personal character are the main selection criteria.

The festival attracts an average of 700,000 people. During the 2016 Oktoberfest parade, an estimated 150,000 lined the streets along the route.

=== Kitchener–Waterloo in film and music ===
Various locations in Kitchener and Waterloo were used to portray the fictional Ontario town of Wessex in the filming of Canadian television sitcom Dan for Mayor, starring Corner Gas star Fred Ewanuick.

A local folk group, Destroy All Robots, wrote a tongue-in-cheek song jibing the city of Kitchener, "Battle Hymn of the City of Kitchener, Ontario".

=== Kitchener Blues Festival ===
The Kitchener Blues Festival is a four-day festival in downtown Kitchener dedicated to blues music, always held in August on the weekend following the civic holiday. The festival has expanded to four stages and two workshop stages throughout the downtown area, with over 90 performances. It has grown from a one-day event with an attendance of 3,000 to a four-day event with over 150,000 attending. In 2014 the Kitchener Blues Festival celebrated its 14th year.

=== Kitchener–Waterloo Multicultural Festival ===
This is a two-day event in Victoria Park commencing usually on the first weekend of the summer. Run by the Kitchener-Waterloo Multicultural Centre, the festival features foods, dance and music from around the world. The festival also showcases several vendors that sell artifacts and crafts from around the world. This festival has been ongoing for well over 40 years. Well over 50,000 attend every year.

=== KOI Music Festival ===
KOI Music Festival was a three-day festival held annually in downtown Kitchener each September. The festival was started in 2010 and has since expanded to include a free concert on Friday and a full day of performance Saturday and Sunday. KOI features more than 100 rock bands every year, with a large focus on local, independent musicians. Notable past performers include Every Time I Die, Ubiquitous Synergy Seeker, Chiodos, Walk Off The Earth, Four Year Strong, Protest the Hero, Mad Caddies, Monster Truck, Gob, Treble Charger, Cute Is What We Aim For, The Planet Smashers, Bayside, and several hundred more.

=== Kultrun World Music Festival ===
Kultrún is an annual festival of world music, food, culture, and art that takes place in Victoria Park each July. Music from various cultures is performed on two stages, and the rest of the park is covered with vendors selling their goods. A key part of the festival is the large number of food stands selling foods from all different ethnic backgrounds.

=== LGBT culture ===
The Kitchener-Waterloo region is home to tri-Pride and the Rainbow Reels Queer and Trans Film Festival. Unlike most LGBT pride events, tri-Pride does not currently organize a parade, but instead is centred on an afternoon music festival on the final weekend.

== Recreation ==
The Kitchener–Waterloo Symphony was located in Kitchener, which performed over 222 concerts annually to an audience of over 90,000, both in the concert hall and across Waterloo Region. The KWS was the largest employer of artists and cultural workers and the most significant cultural asset for Waterloo Region.

Kitchener's oldest outdoor park is Victoria Park, in the heart of downtown Kitchener. Numerous events and festivities are held in this park.

A cast-bronze statue of Queen Victoria is in Victoria Park, along with a cannon. The statue was unveiled in May 1911, on Victoria Day (the Queen's birthday) in the tenth year after her death. The Princess of Wales Chapter of the Imperial Order Daughters of the Empire raised the $6,000 needed for the monument.

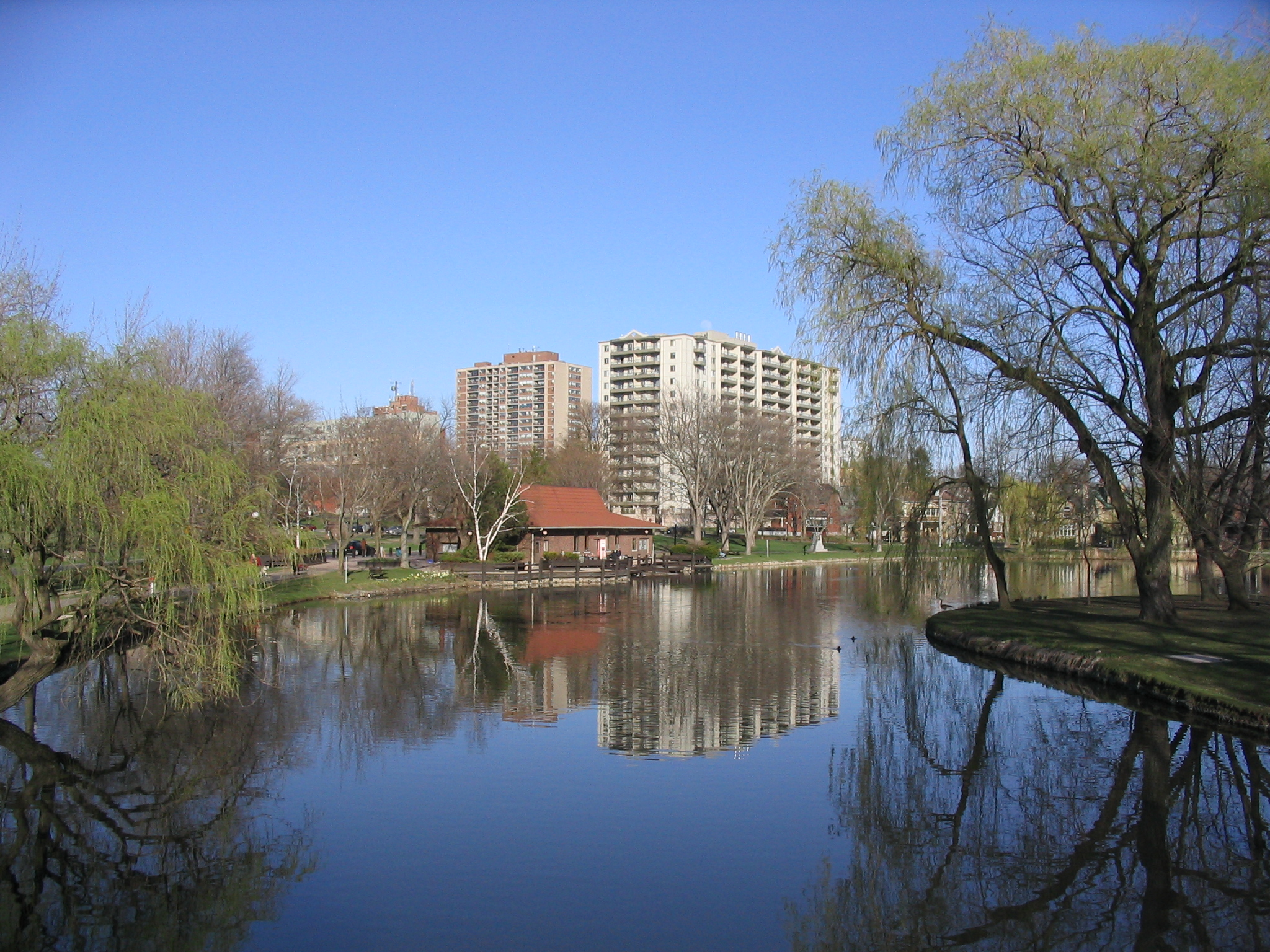
Victoria Park

Rockway Gardens are adjacent to the Rockway golf course and occupy a long narrow strip of land alongside King Street as it rushes down to meet the Conestoga Parkway and become Highway 8. It is a popular site for wedding photos in the summer.

Kitchener has an extensive community trail system. The trails, which are controlled and run by the city, are hundreds of kilometres in length. Due to Kitchener's close proximity to the Grand River, several community trails and paths border the river's shores. This convenient access to the Grand River has drawn tourists to the city. However, Kitchener's trails and especially natural areas remain underfunded by city council and as a result, many are not adequately maintained.

In 2011, a bike park at the newly constructed McLennan Park, in the city's south end, was hailed as one of the best city-run bike parks in Southern Ontario by BMX and mountain biking enthusiasts. The bike park offers a four-cross (4X) section, a pump track section, a jump park, and a free-ride course. McLennan Park also features an accessible play area, a splash pad, basketball courts, beach volleyball courts, a leash-free dog area, and a toboggan hill.

Chicopee Ski Club is also within the city limits.

== Transport ==
=== Highways and expressways ===
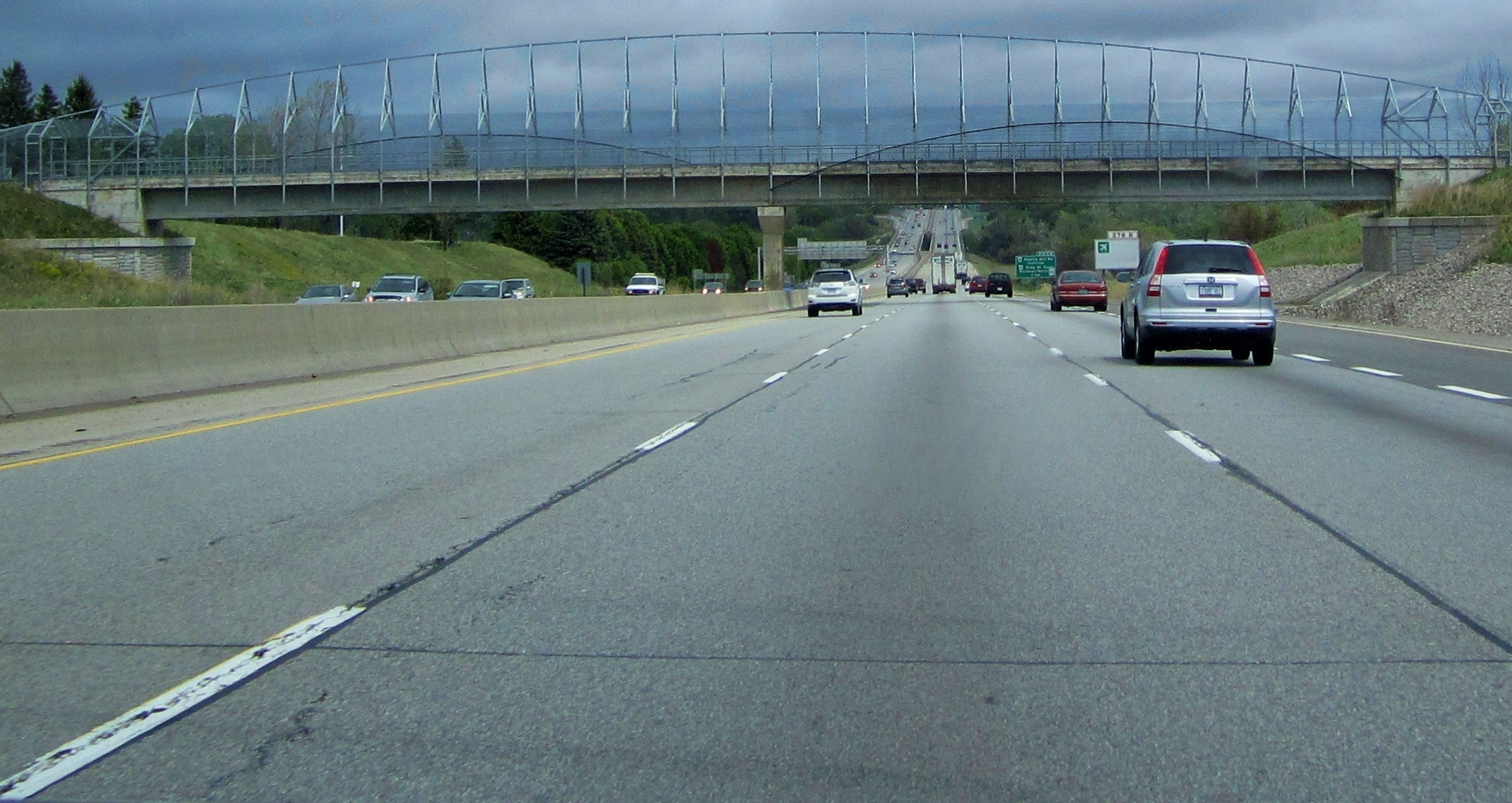
Highway 401 in Kitchener looking east towards the Grand River

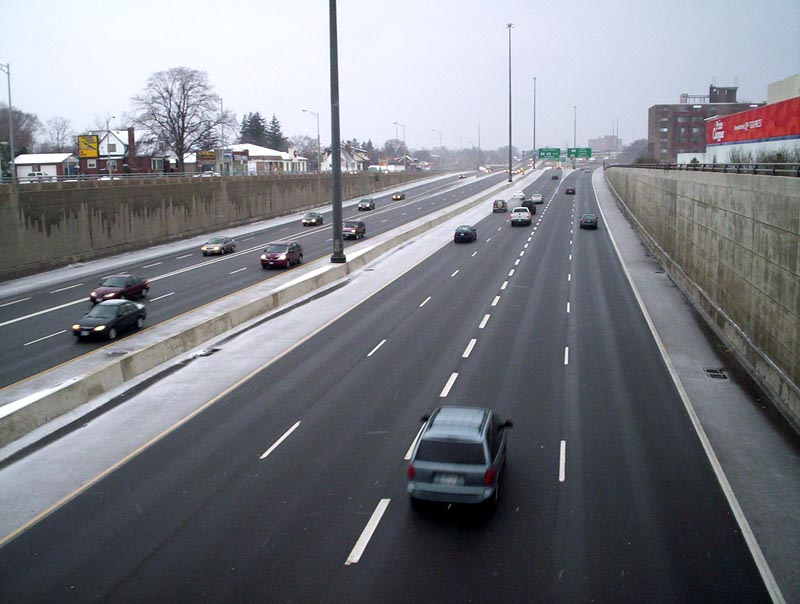
Highway 8 as seen from Franklin Street bridge

Kitchener was very proactive and visionary about its transportation network in the 1960s, with the province undertaking at that time construction of the Conestoga Parkway from the western boundary (just past Homer Watson Boulevard) across the south side of the city and looping north along the Grand River to Northfield Drive in Waterloo. Subsequent upgrades took the Conestoga west beyond Trussler Road and north towards St Jacobs, with eight lanes through its middle stretch.

The Conestoga Parkway bears the provincial highway designations of Highways 7, 8 and 85. King Street becomes Hwy 8 where it meets the Parkway in the south and leads down to the 401, but Old King Street survives as the street-route through Freeport to the Preston area of Cambridge. Up until construction of the Conestoga, Highland Road through Baden had been the primary highway to Stratford. Victoria Street was then and remains the primary highway to Guelph but this is slated to be bypassed with an entirely new highway beginning at the Wellington Street exit and running roughly north of and parallel to the old route.

There are two interchanges with Highway 401 on Kitchener's southern border. In addition to the primary link where Hwy 8 merges into the Hwy 401, there is another interchange on the west side with Homer Watson Boulevard.

In order to reduce the congestion on Highway 8, a new interchange has been proposed on Highway 401 at Trussler Road, which would serve the rapidly growing west side of Kitchener. Although this proposal is supported by the Region of Waterloo, the Ontario Ministry of Transportation has no plans to proceed with an interchange at Trussler Road.

=== City streets ===
Unlike most southern Ontario cities whose streets follow a strict British grid survey pattern, Kitchener's streets are laid out in a complex radial pattern on the Continental models most familiar to the German settlers.

There is good historical reason for this. Kitchener was one of the few places in Ontario where the settlers arrived in advance of government surveyors. The Mennonites who had banded together as the German Company to purchase the township from Richard Beasley simply divided their vast parcel of land by the number of shareholder households and then drew random lots to confer title on individual farms. There was no grid survey done—no lines, no concessions, no right-of-way corridors for roads. When it came time to punch roads through the wilderness, the farmers modelled the road network on what was familiar to them, which was the pattern of villages in Switzerland and southern Germany.

This is a Continental Radial pattern and the result was major streets extended through diagonals cutting across the grid of smaller streets and converging at multiple-point intersections which, as the communities became more prosperous and if the automobile had not displaced the horse, might someday have become roundabouts decorated with circular gardens, fountains or statuary in the style of European cities. Five-point intersections created by converging diagonals are legion in the older areas.

In 2004, roundabouts were introduced to the Region of Waterloo. Besides improving traffic flow, they will help the region lower pollution from emissions created by idling vehicles. In 2006, the first two were installed along Ira Needles Boulevard in Kitchener. Some people argue roundabouts are ideal for intersections in this region because of the aforementioned historical growth along Continental radial patterns versus the British grid systems, but all installs have been at T and cross intersections making the point irrelevant.

A controversial plan would extend River Road through an area known as Hidden Valley, but the pressure of traffic and the absence of any other full east–west arterials between Fairway Road and the Highway 401 is forcing this development ahead.

=== Public transport ===
==== Early history ====
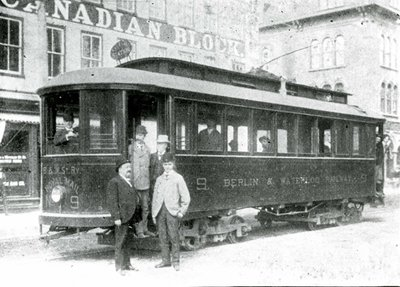
The Berlin and Waterloo Street Railway, seen here on King Street in downtown Kitchener, was the earliest documented public transport in the city.

The earliest recorded urban public transport in Kitchener was a horse-drawn streetcar service along King Street, the Berlin and Waterloo Street Railway, which began operating in 1888. The system was electrified in 1895. The Preston and Berlin Street Railway, an interurban service connecting Kitchener to Preston (now a part of Cambridge), began operation in 1904. It used a stretch of Berlin and Waterloo Street Railway tracks to access downtown Kitchener. In 1906, the Berlin and Waterloo Street Railway was municipalized and came under the management of the Berlin Light and Power Commission, which was renamed the Berlin Public Utilities Commission. It was later renamed the Kitchener and Waterloo Street Railway following the city's official name change, with the commission also being renamed to the Kitchener Public Utilities Commission (PUC).

In 1923, the successor of the Preston and Berlin Street Railway, the Grand River Railway, built a new mainline which bypassed downtown Kitchener. Its new transfer point to the municipal streetcar system was Kitchener Junction station at what was then the south end of the city, which was also the site of the PUC's streetcar depot. Starting in 1939, buses began being used for crosstown bus services which intersected with the streetcar line. In 1947, the PUC replaced the street railway system with a trolleybus system. The streetcar rails were removed from King Street in the 1950s. In 1973, local bus services were transferred from the PUC to a newly created entity, Kitchener Transit. Shortly after this, trolleybus service was discontinued and the system was switched entirely to diesel buses. A new bus garage, located in the area of the former village of Strasburg, was opened in the mid-1970s. The new bus system was reorganized around a downtown bus terminal which was located on Duke Street. This was later replaced in 1988 by the Charles Street Terminal, which itself was closed in 2019 following the launch of Ion light rail service.

==== Grand River Transit ====
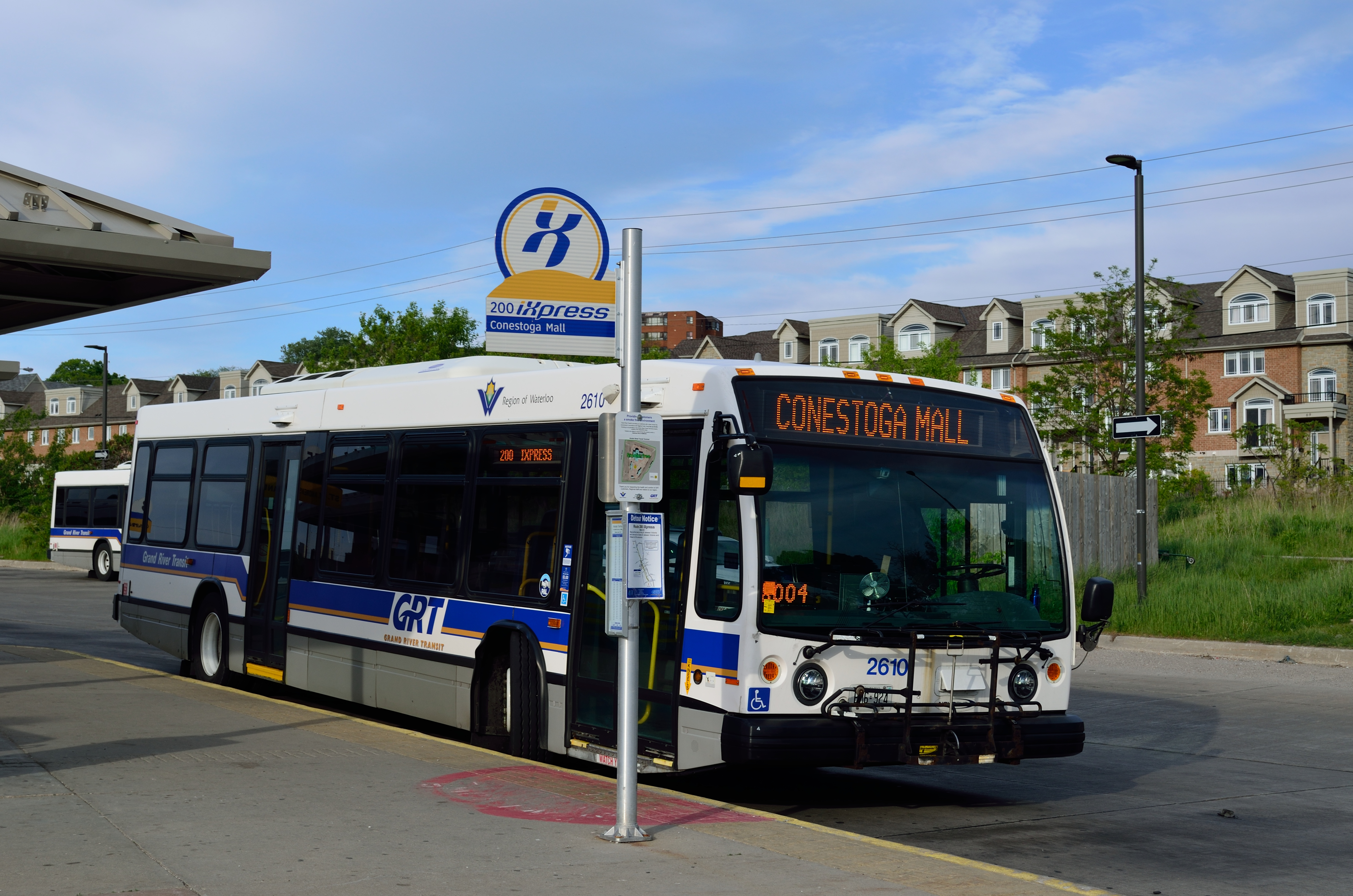
The iXpress system provides express bus service connecting downtown Kitchener to its suburbs, as well as to the neighbouring cities of Waterloo and Cambridge.

In 2000, Kitchener Transit was merged with Cambridge Transit and put under the management of the Region of Waterloo, becoming known as Grand River Transit (GRT). GRT began reorganizing its expanded network, which now serves the three cities of Kitchener, Waterloo, and Cambridge as a unified regional transit system. In 2003, the Region of Waterloo received a federal grant to fund its Central Transit Corridor Express plan, which built on earlier proposals dating as far back as the 1970s for a regional express transit corridor connecting Kitchener, Waterloo, and Cambridge. Its initial implementation, in 2005, was a single-route, limited-stop express bus service branded as iXpress, along with the implementation of technologies like transit signal priority (TSP) which were new to the region at the time. Major iXpress stations in Kitchener were Grand River Hospital, Fairview (now Fairway station), and the Charles Street Terminal. New iXpress routes were added in the years that followed, with the original route being rebranded as the 200 iXpress. After the launch of Ion light rail service in 2019, GRT bus routes were reorganized to connect with it, using the light rail system as a "spine" much like the earlier streetcar and trolleybus systems of the 20th century.

As of 2021, there are a total of 54 GRT bus routes throughout the Region of Waterloo; 48 are local and 6 are part of the iXpress system. A number of GRT routes connect Kitchener to the neighbouring cities of Waterloo and Cambridge. Travel on GRT to the township of Woolwich requires a transfer at Conestoga station in Waterloo, and travel to the township of Wilmot requires a transfer at the Boardwalk mall, which straddles the municipal border between Kitchener and Waterloo. GRT, in partnership with Metrolinx, is working on a microtransit pilot project that would connect Kitchener with the community of Breslau, which is across the Grand River in eastern Woolwich township; the project's planned launch date is in 2021.

==== Light rail ====
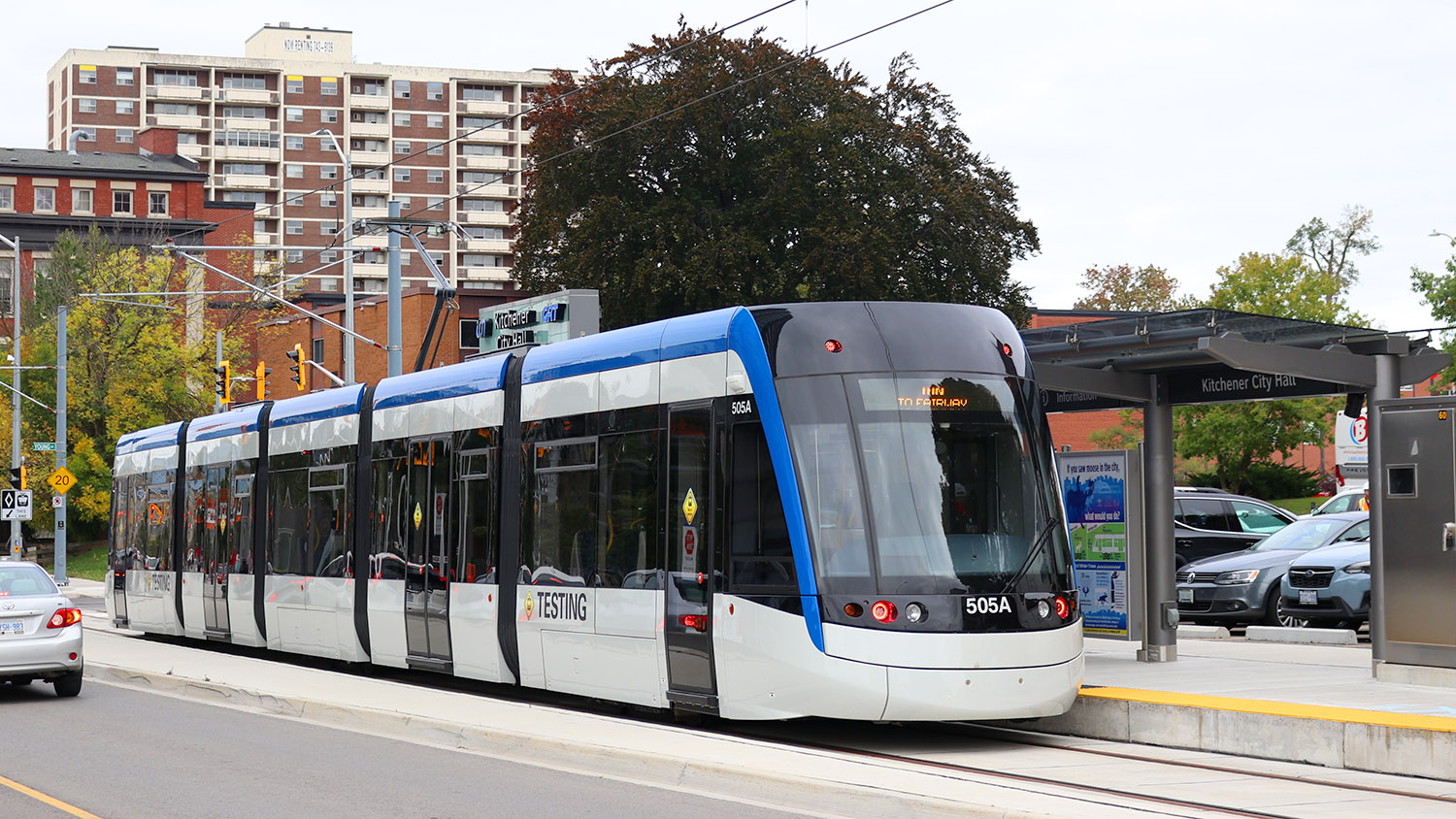
Ion light rail service began in 2019.

Long-term planning around the Central Transit Corridor led to many interconnected initiatives being bundled into a staged rapid transit plan. In June 2011, the Waterloo Region council approved the Stage 1 plan for a single-line light rail transit (LRT) system between the existing bus terminals at Conestoga Mall in north Waterloo and Fairview Park Mall in south Kitchener, with adapted bus rapid transit (aBRT) connecting through to downtown Galt in Cambridge. Stage 2, which as of 2021 is still in planning, would replace the aBRT route with an extension of the light rail line.

Construction of the light rail system began in August 2014 and Stage 1 service was expected to begin in 2017. Most of the rails had been installed by the end of 2016, and the maintenance facility and all underground utility work had been completed. The start date of service was postponed to early 2018, however, because of delays in the manufacture and delivery of the vehicles by Bombardier Transportation; by 24 February 2017, only a single light rail vehicle had arrived for testing. The start of service was then further delayed to December 2018. After an accelerated testing schedule, the service opened to the public on 21 June 2019.

As of 2021, Ion light rail serves Kitchener and Waterloo exclusively, while the Ion Bus service connects Kitchener to Cambridge. From downtown Kitchener, a single-seat Ion train ride is available as far north as Conestoga station in north Waterloo, and as far south as Fairway station in south Kitchener; from the latter, a transfer is necessary to reach Cambridge using the Ion Bus, 206 Coronation iXpress, or local bus routes.

==== Intercity transit ====
Via Rail intercity passenger rail service is available at Kitchener station. Via Rail trains pass through Kitchener eastbound on their way to Toronto's Union Station and westbound on their way to London and Sarnia.

Kitchener is also served by GO Transit buses and trains, the latter operating as the GO Kitchener line. GO Transit bus service to Kitchener began on 31 October 2009, with a route stopping at Kitchener's Charles Street Terminal on the way from Waterloo to Mississauga. This was followed on 19 December 2011 by the extension of GO train service to Kitchener from its previous terminus at Georgetown. GO bus service consists of the 25 Waterloo–Mississauga and 30 Kitchener routes. Both routes connect Kitchener with points east; the former to Mississauga's Square One Bus Terminal via Sportsworld (in southeast Kitchener), Cambridge, Aberfoyle, and Milton, and the latter as a limited-stop express to Bramalea with some stops in northern Mississauga. GO train service also travels east, terminating at Toronto's Union Station. A new bus service was launched on April 9, 2022, by FlixBus to link Kitchener and Toronto via a more direct route.

=== Railways ===
Kitchener's primary railway corridor is the CN/GO Guelph Subdivision. It runs approximately east–west through the northern section of downtown Kitchener. It was originally laid out and constructed in 1856 by the Grand Trunk Railway (GTR), and after the GTR's acquisition of the Great Western Railway, the mainline through Kitchener became known informally as the "North Main Line" in contrast with the "South Main Line" through Brantford, both connecting London and Toronto. Coming from the east, the Waterloo Spur diverges from the mainline and heads north through Waterloo and ultimately to Elmira. The spur was formerly owned by CN, but is now owned by the Region of Waterloo.

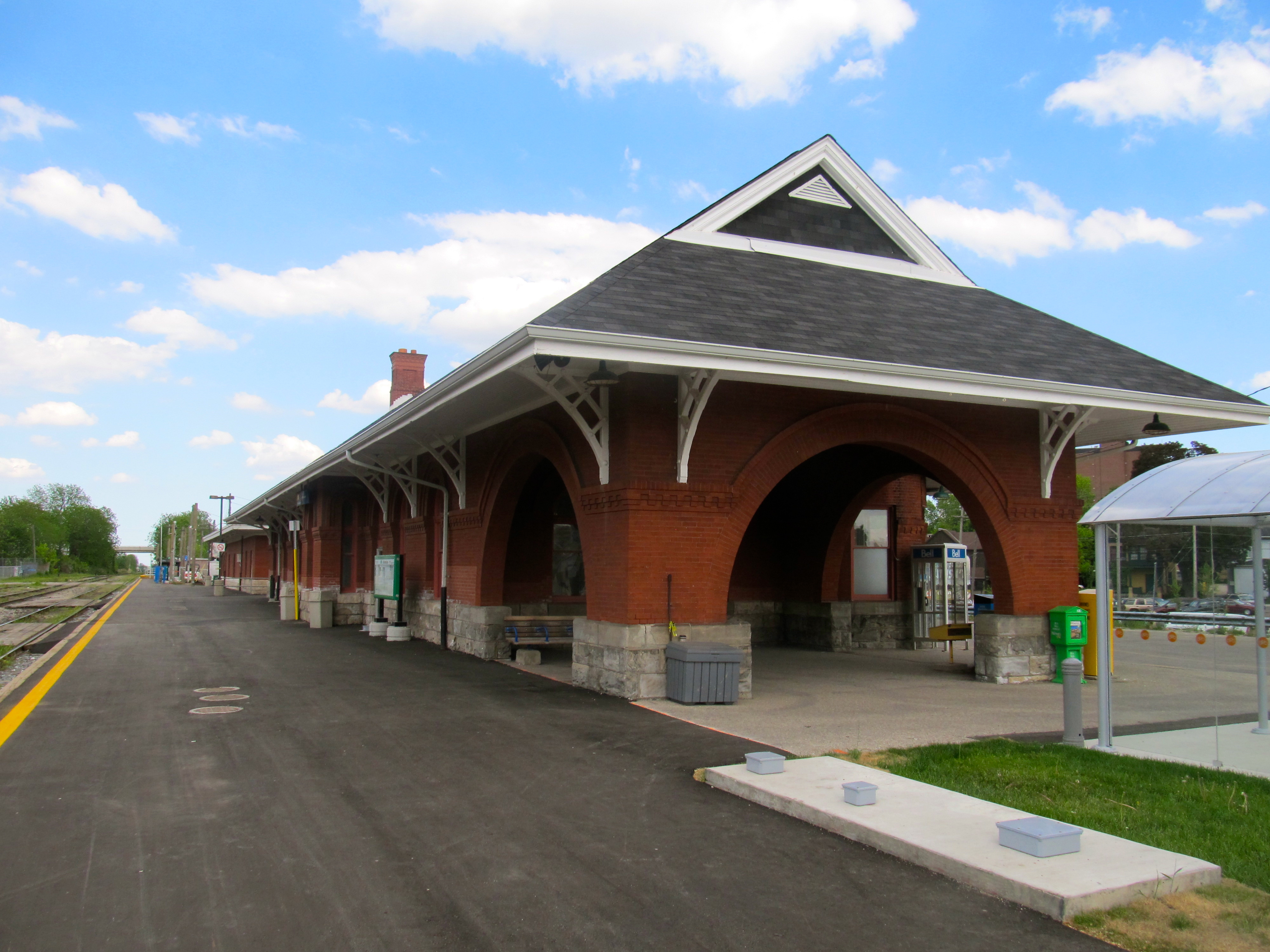
Kitchener station is the city's intercity passenger railway station.

Kitchener station lies a short distance west along the track from the junction with the Waterloo Spur. The current station building dates from 1897 and is a heritage structure which is owned by Via Rail, Canada's national passenger railway. Both Via Rail Corridor service and GO Transit Kitchener line service are available at the station, the latter of which has its western terminus at the station. Via Rail service consists of two trains per day in each direction along the Toronto–London–Sarnia route; one westbound train terminates at Sarnia while another terminates at London, while both eastbound trains terminate at Toronto Union Station. GO train service was originally extended to Kitchener in 2011 from its previous western terminus at Georgetown. GO service began with two trains per direction per weekday, but since its inception train frequency has gradually increased and as of early 2020 it stands at 8 eastbound and 7 westbound trains per weekday, with no weekend service. In 2017, Metrolinx (the parent agency of GO Transit) constructed a purpose-built train layover facility on Shirley Avenue to supplement its existing adapted layover facility, which was at capacity.

While Kitchener benefits from increasingly frequent commuter-oriented GO service east to Toronto, intercity Via Rail service to the city has been largely unchanged for years, limiting its connectivity to Southwestern Ontario to the west. In contrast, the South Main Line through Brantford (which is still owned by CN) has faster and more frequent service between Toronto and London than the North Main Line does, along with larger double-tracked sections. In 2017, the Ontario Liberal government proposed a Windsor–Toronto high-speed rail line through Kitchener, which would improve travel times to nearby major cities as well as to the Toronto Pearson International Airport. The proposal, if approved, would provide a 48-minute trip from Kitchener to downtown Toronto. With the election of a new Conservative government, funding for the project was indefinitely paused.

Freight trains in Kitchener are operated by the Canadian National Railway and the Canadian Pacific Railway. These railways serve several customers, many of which are in industrial parks in southern Kitchener.

=== Air ===
The closest airport to Kitchener is the Region of Waterloo International Airport (CYKF/YKF) in nearby Breslau, about 12 km by road from downtown Kitchener. While it is a thriving general-aviation field, it is not heavily served by scheduled airlines. WestJet offers year-round service to Calgary. Flair has the largest presence at YKF using the airport, formally using the airport as a main base. Flair closed the crew base at the airport in October 2025 alongside the closing of international routes to Mexico, The Caribbean and the United States choosing to focus on Domestic routes such as Calgary, Halifax, Vancouver and Abbotsford. Air Canada in partnership with landline bus services offers busses to and from Toronto Pearson International. There is a helipad in Kitchener near Google's Kitchener offices. In June 2017 the helipad was temporarily closed due to possible interference from a construction crane on the flight path.

== Neighbourhoods ==
There are 10 wards, and 53 planning communities or neighbourhoods. There are also 29 neighbourhood associations recognized by the city, which in some cases do not correspond to the names and boundaries of planning communities designated by the city. In some cases the neighbourhood associations cover several neighbourhoods and/or planning communities and the name of one neighbourhood is sometimes used to refer to the entire area.

The Stanley Park Neighbourhood Association, for example, covers much of the eastern and southeastern area of the city including the planning communities of Stanley Park, Heritage Park, Idlewood, and Grand River North and South. Further complicating things is that the first area of development named Stanley Park, which is where Stanley Park school is located and where Stanley Park Conservation Area is located, has been included within the city's planning district of Heritage Park, leaving only later-developed areas of Stanley Park plus an adjacent residential neighbourhood to the south, originally referred to as Sunnyside, in the Stanley Park planning neighbourhood. The Forest Heights Neighbourhood Association includes the Forest Hills neighbourhood/planning district to the east of Forest Heights proper.

== Sports ==
From 30 July to 2 August 2026, Kitchener, Waterloo and Cambridge co-hosted the 2026 Ontario Summer Games.

Professional, semi pro, junior and pro-am teams
Club	League	Venue	Established	Championships
KW Titans	Canadian Elite Basketball League	Kitchener Memorial Auditorium	2016	0
Kitchener Rangers	Ontario Hockey League	Kitchener Memorial Auditorium	1963	5
Kitchener Panthers	Canadian Baseball League	Jack Couch Park	1919	13

== Other sports teams and leagues ==
- Tri-City Roller Derby, members of the international Women's Flat Track Derby Association, play competitive roller derby at venues in Waterloo, Kitchener and New Hamburg.
- District 8 Athletic Association, a secondary school sports association servicing the Catholic and Independent high schools of the Kitchener, Waterloo and Cambridge. A member of Central Western Ontario Secondary Schools Association and Ontario Federation of School Athletic Associations.
- Waterloo Region Minor Football Association, formerly the Twin Cities Minor Tackle Football Association. Commonly known as the "Predators" or "Preds" the WRMFA provides an opportunity for athletes under the age of 19 to play football and to compete at the highest level. The Varsity team holds membership in the Ontario Provincial Football league as of 2020, formerly being of the Ontario Football Conference. Players do not come exclusively from the Twin Cities, but from all across the region, including St. Jacobs, Elmira, Wellesley, Baden, Breslau, Palmerston, New Hamburg, Breslau, St. Clements, Drayton and Maryhill.

== Notable people ==
=== Academia ===
- Richard Bader, computational chemist
- Beverley Diamond, ethnomusicologist
- James G. Mitchell, computer scientist
- Karl Schweizer, historian, author
- Meena Waseem, Pakistani-Canadian and Muslim advocate for accessible education
- Walter Zinn, nuclear physicist

=== Athletics and sports ===
- Chelsea Aubry, basketball player
- Don Awrey, ice hockey player
- Nathan Bastian, ice hockey player
- Bobby Bauer, ice hockey player
- Don Beaupre, ice hockey player
- Vivian Berkeley, World Champion blind lawn bowler and 1996 Paralympic silver medalist
- Brian Bradley, ice hockey player
- Christopher Chalmers, freestyle swimmer
- Gary Cowan, golfer
- Steve Dietrich, general manager of the Buffalo Bandits lacrosse team
- Gary Dornhoefer, ice hockey player
- Woody Dumart, ice hockey player, Hall of Fame
- David Edgar, soccer player
- Dana Ellis, pole vaulter
- Wayne Erdman, judoka
- John "Jack" Gibson, Hockey Hall of Fame, soccer player
- George Hainsworth, ice hockey player
- Mike Hoffman, ice hockey player
- Chris Johnson, boxer
- Rylee Foster, goalkeeper, Liverpool F.C. Women 2020–2022
- Kevin Klein, ice hockey player
- Bobby Kuntz, football player
- Beau Landry, gridiron football player
- Lennox Lewis, professional boxer, three-time heavyweight champion
- Steven Lorentz, ice hockey player
- Scott Manning, football player and stunt pilot
- Howie Meeker, ice hockey player and Hockey Night in Canada broadcaster
- Jamal Murray, basketball player
- Moe Norman, golfer
- Sarah Pavan, beach volleyball player
- Tanner Pearson, ice hockey player
- Ronnie Pfeffer, football player
- Andrew Poje, Olympic ice dancer
- Mike Poulin, professional lacrosse player
- Pan Qingfu, Kung-Fu master
- Paul Reinhart, ice hockey player
- Jason Reso (aka Christian Cage), professional wrestler
- Steven Rice, ice hockey player
- Jim Sandlak, ice hockey player
- Mark Scheifele, ice hockey player, 7th overall pick to the Winnipeg Jets in 2011 NHL draft
- Brad Schlegel, ice hockey player
- Milt Schmidt, ice hockey player, coach, and general manager, Hockey Hall of Fame
- Frank J. Selke, ice hockey general manager, Hockey Hall of Fame
- Steve Seftel, ice hockey player, author
- Logan Stanley, ice hockey player
- Scott Stevens, Hall of Fame ice hockey player
- Kelly Vanderbeek, alpine skier, CBC personality
- Fitz Vanderpool, former World Boxing Council and World Boxing Association champion
- Tyler Varga, former fullback for the Indianapolis Colts
- Mike West, backstroke swimmer
- Dennis Wideman, ice hockey player
- Aaron Wilson, lacrosse player
- Bennett Wolf, ice hockey player
- Will Riley, basketball player

=== Business ===
- Carl Pollock, industrialist, Electrohome Ltd
- Bramwell Tillsley, former General of The Salvation Army
- Walter P. Zeller, founder of Zellers; born near the city

=== Literature ===
- John Robert Colombo, writer
- Ross Macdonald, pseudonym of Kenneth Millar
- Margaret Millar, author
- David Morrell, author, creator of the Rambo franchise
- Dave Sim, creator of the comic book Cerebus the Aardvark
- Edna Staebler, author
- Matthew Tierney (poet)

=== Music, entertainment, and the arts ===
- Raffi Armenian, conductor
- Kimberly Barber, mezzo-soprano
- Elise Bauman, actress
- Ricky Berwick, internet personality, comedian, and video creator.
- Norman Blake, musician, member of Teenage Fanclub
- Kristin Booth, actress
- A. J. Bridel, musical theater actress
- Mel Brown, blues musician
- Alex Bulmer, theatre artist
- Gail Dahms, actress and singer
- Bob Egan, musician, member of Blue Rodeo
- Liza Fromer, co-host of The Morning Show, Global Television Network
- Nick Hector, film editor
- Dale Heslip, documentary and music video director
- Derek Hines, jazz vocalist
- James Hobson, engineer and YouTube video creator
- Allen Kaeja, film director and choreographer
- Kathryn Ladano, bass clarinetist and composer
- Lisa LaFlamme, television news anchor, CTV Television Network
- Glenn Lewis, neo soul singer-songwriter
- Paul MacLeod, singer-songwriter
- Master T, television and radio personality, MuchMusic
- Lois Maxwell, actress
- Danny Michel, musician
- Pavan Moondi, film and television director
- Diane Nyland, actress, director, and choreographer
- Jeremy Ratchford, actor
- Steve Strongman, blues guitarist
- Rob Szabo, music producer and performer
- Tasha the Amazon, hip hop musician
- Homer Watson, landscape artist
- Dawud Wharnsby, singer-songwriter, poet, and performer
- JJ Wilde, rock singer
- Chris Williams, director and animator

=== Politics ===
- Louis Orville Breithaupt, 18th Lieutenant-Governor of Ontario (1952–1957)
- David Eby, Premier of British Columbia
- William Lyon Mackenzie King, Canada's tenth, and longest-serving, prime minister
- Michael Kraus, minister and entrepreneur

== See also ==
- List of cities in Ontario
- Berlin Opera House
