= List of oldest buildings and structures in the Regional Municipality of Waterloo =

The Regional Municipality of Waterloo, Ontario, Canada has a mixed style of buildings originally located in small towns and farming communities starting from the 19th century. After 1900, commercial and industrial buildings also appeared.

== 1810s ==
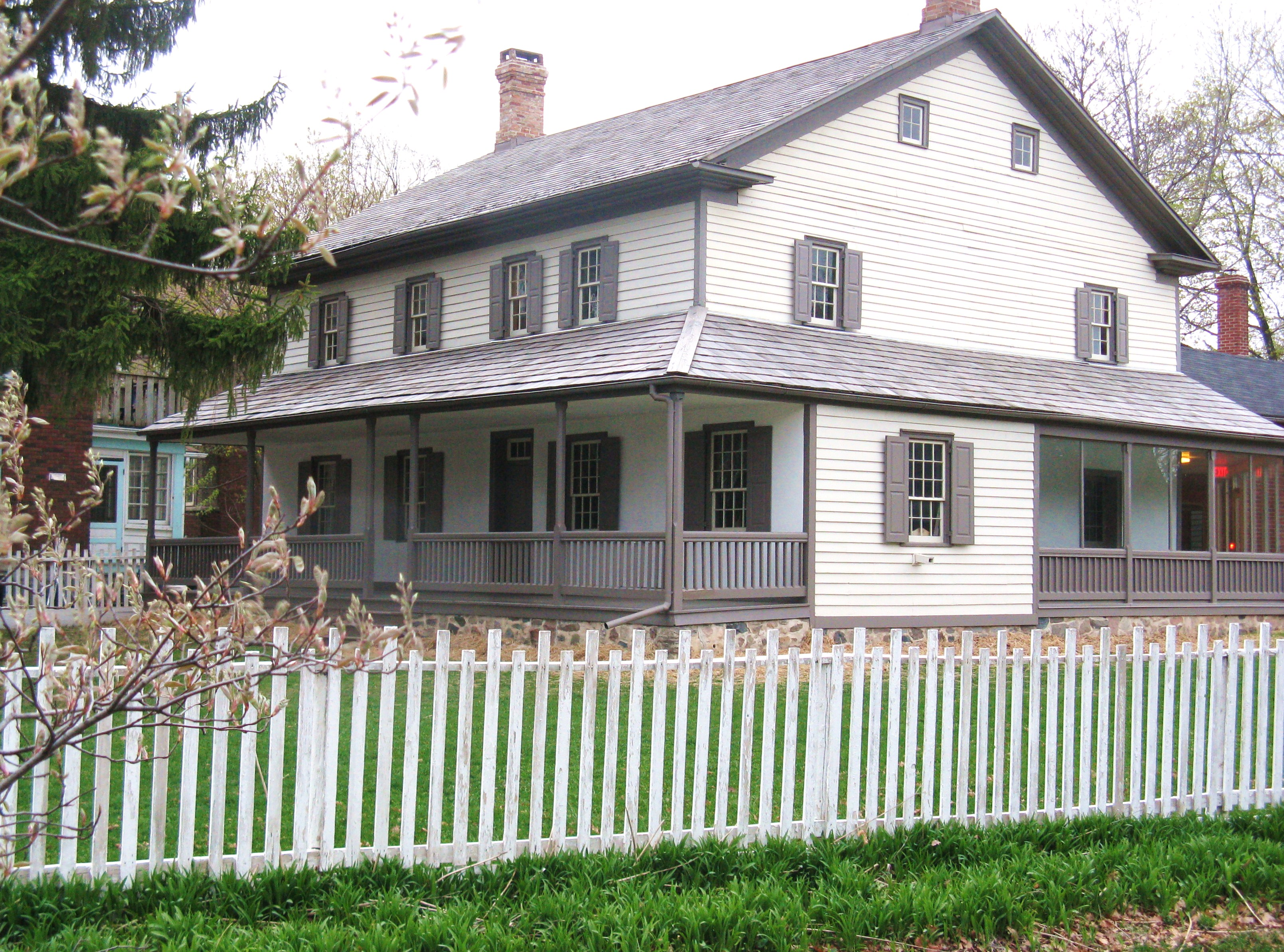
Joseph Schneider Haus, one of the oldest extant buildings in the area, has been designated as a National Historic Site.

Building	Year Completed	Builder	Location
Erb-Kumpf House	1812		Waterloo
Joseph Schneider Haus	1816		Kitchener

== 1830s ==
Building	Year Completed	Builder	Location
Woolner Farmstead	1830		Kitchener
Betzner Homestead	c.1830		Kitchener
Schoerg Homestead	c.1830		Kitchener
Homer Watson House	1830s		Doon (Kitchener)

== 1840s ==
Building	Year Completed	Builder	Location
39 Doon Valley Drive	c. 1840		Doon (Kitchener)
Shoemaker House	1840		Bridgeport (Kitchener)
Lancaster Hotel	1840	Gottlieb Bitzer	Bridgeport (Kitchener)
Bristow's Inn	1840s		Elmira
Rummelhardt School	1843		Rummelhardt (Waterloo)
Trinity Anglican Church, Cambridge	1844		
Good Shantz Bosch House	1846		Waterloo
Ruby-Snyder House	1847		Waterloo
Burkholder - Burkhardt House	1849		Waterloo
Voelker House	1849		Waterloo

== 1850s ==
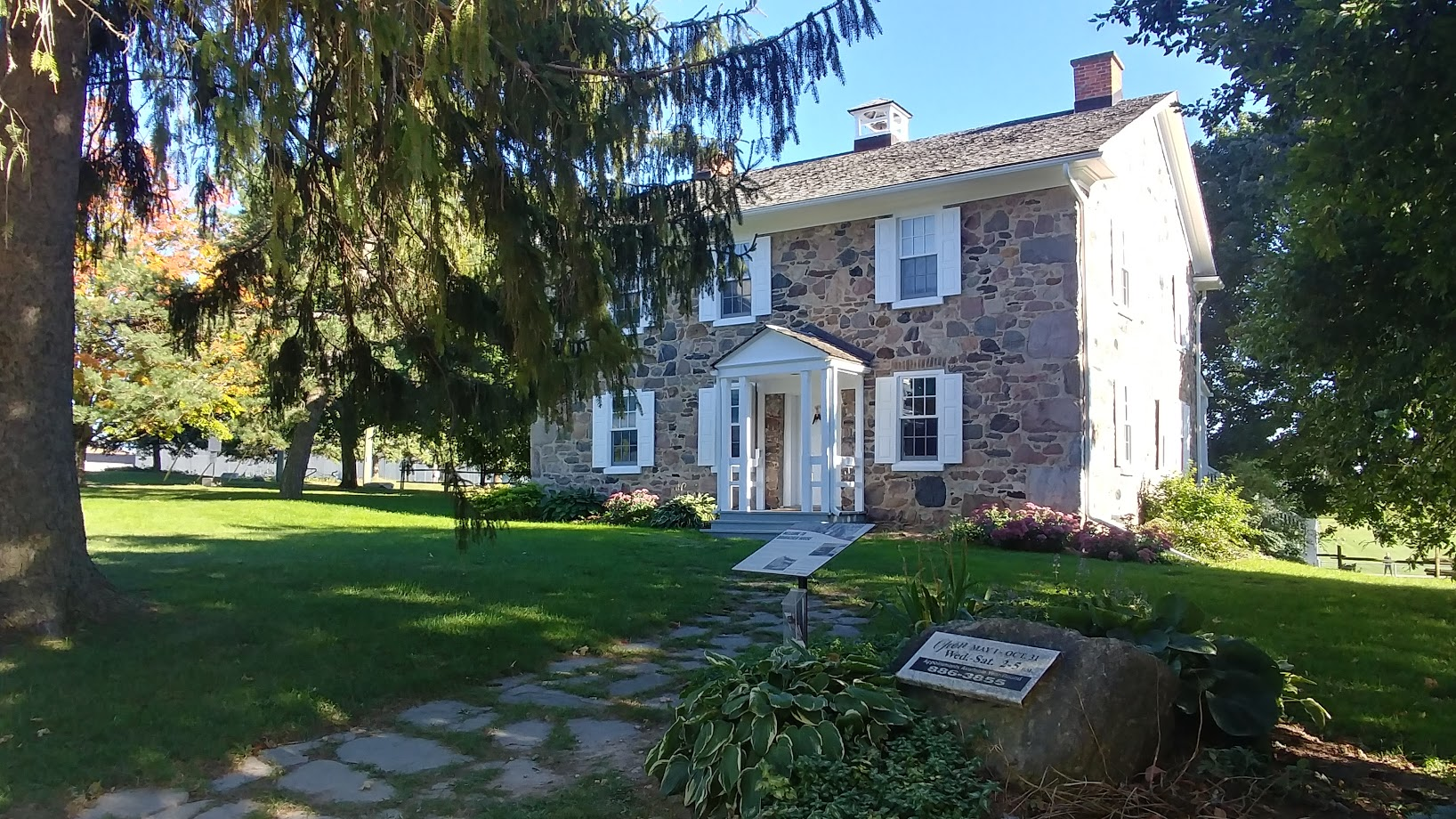
The John E. Brubacher House in Waterloo has been preserved as a historic house museum.

Building	Year Completed	Builder	Location
Brubacher House	1850 or 1851		Waterloo
Waterloo County Jail	1852		Kitchener
1221 Doon Village Road	c.1853		Doon (Kitchener)
138 Church Street	1855		Kitchener
142 Church Street	1855–60		Kitchener
Huether Hotel	1855		Waterloo
Kitchener–Waterloo Collegiate and Vocational School (KCI)	1855		Kitchener
Elam Martin Farmstead	1856		Waterloo
Snyder–Hahn Building	1857	Jacob Bricker	Waterloo
Galt Town Hall	1858	H. B. Sinclair	Galt (Cambridge)
St. Clement's Roman Catholic Church	1858		St. Clements
Nixon House	1859		Waterloo
Richber House	1859		Waterloo

== 1860s ==
Building	Year Completed	Builder	Location
House of Industry & Refuge Poor House Hospital	c. 1860		Kitchener
Canadian Block (72-78 King Street West)	1865		Kitchener
MacLauglin House	1867		Waterloo
Market Hotel	1860s		Waterloo

== 1870s ==
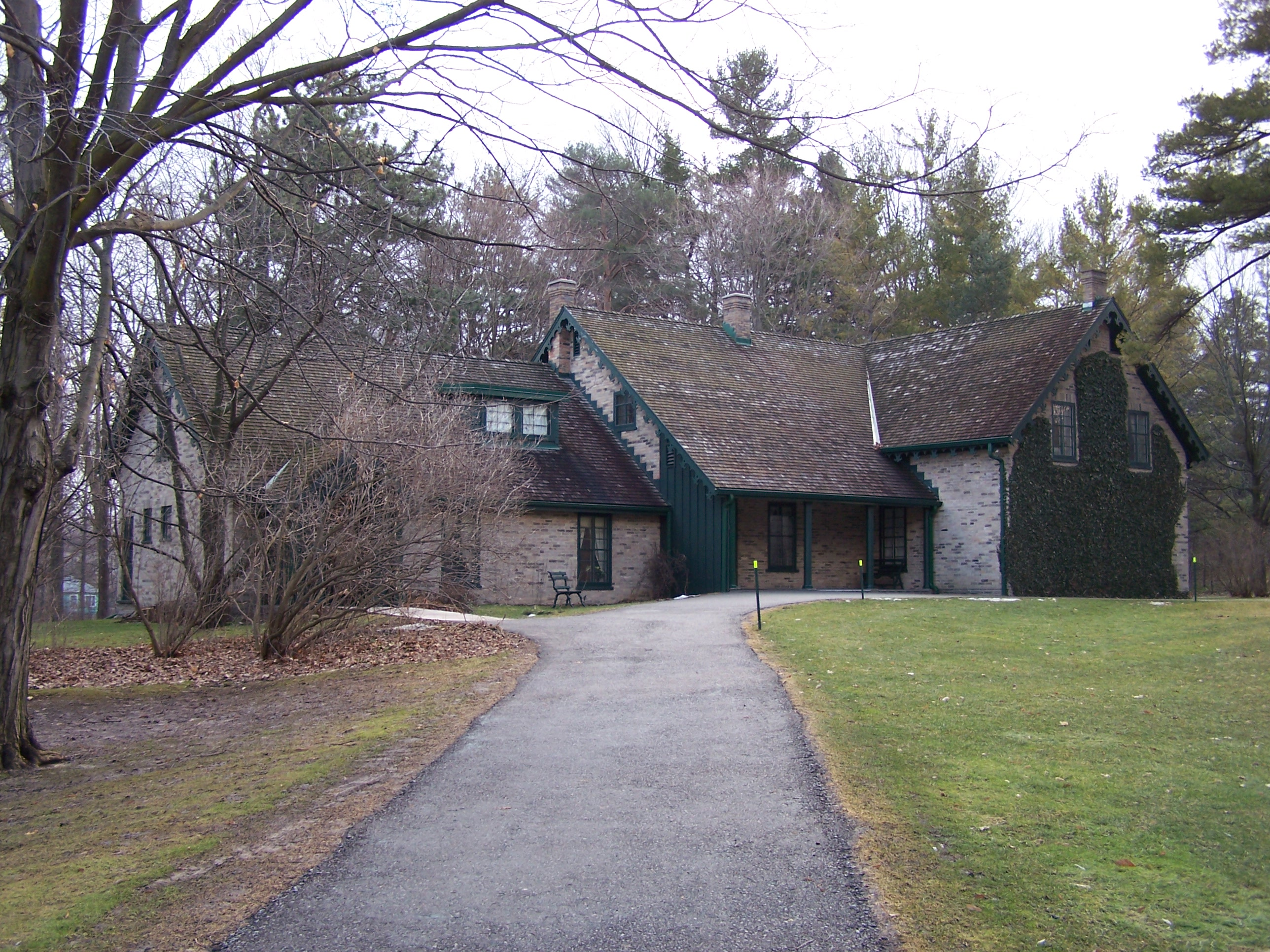
Woodside House as seen in 2006 after its restoration to an 1890s Victorian style.

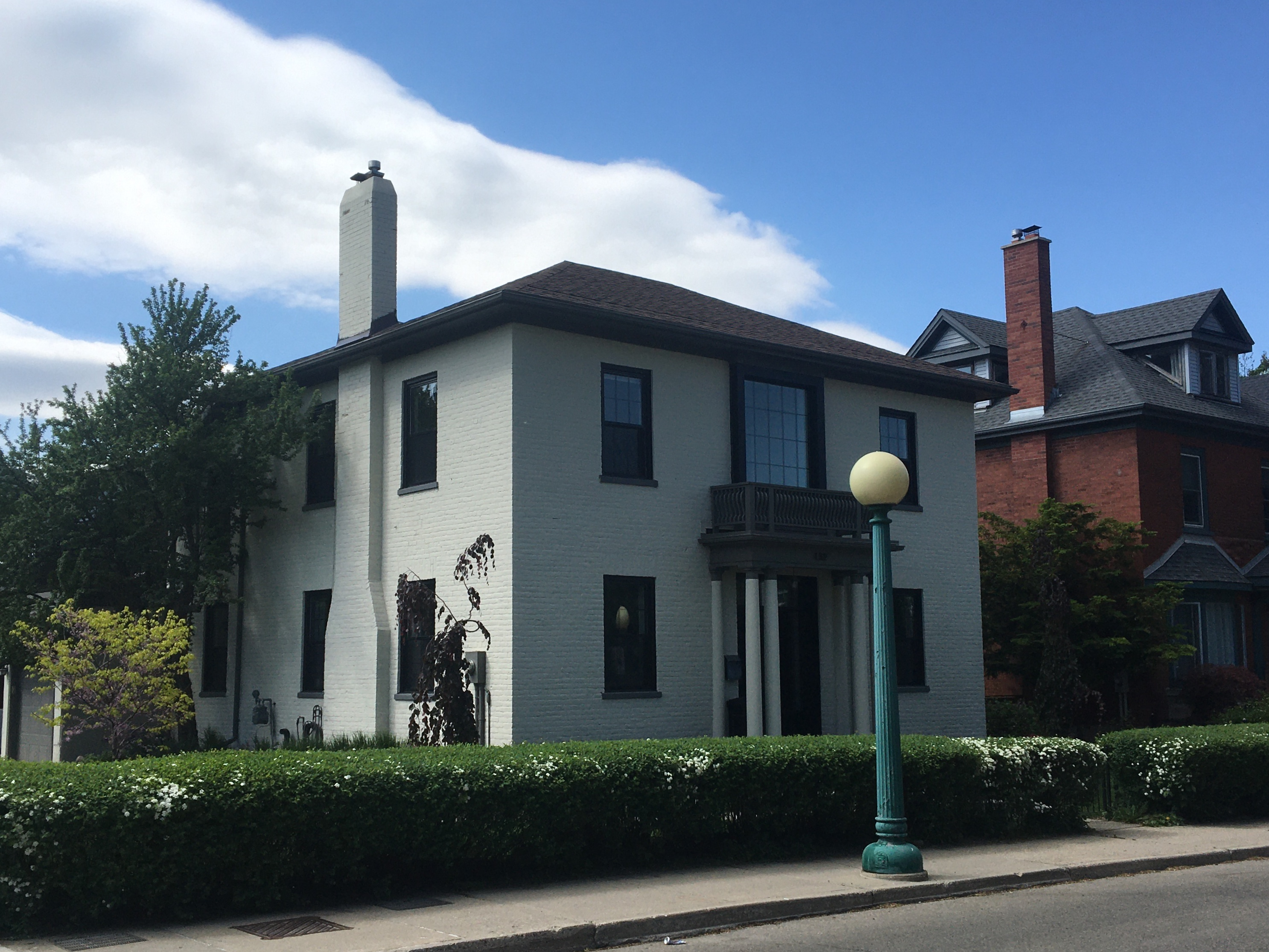
132 Queen St. N. in Kitchener, formerly the home of newspaper editor John Adam Rittinger.

Building	Year Completed	Builder	Location
Woodside National Historic Site	1870s		Kitchener
Elam Martin Farmstead	1870		Waterloo
Sonneck House	1874	Louis Breithaupt	Kitchener
132 Queen Street North	1877		Kitchener
Castle Kilbride	1877		Baden (Wilmot Township)
Waterloo County Governor's House	1878	David W. Gingrick (architect)	Kitchener
307 Queen Street South	1879		Kitchener

== 1880s ==
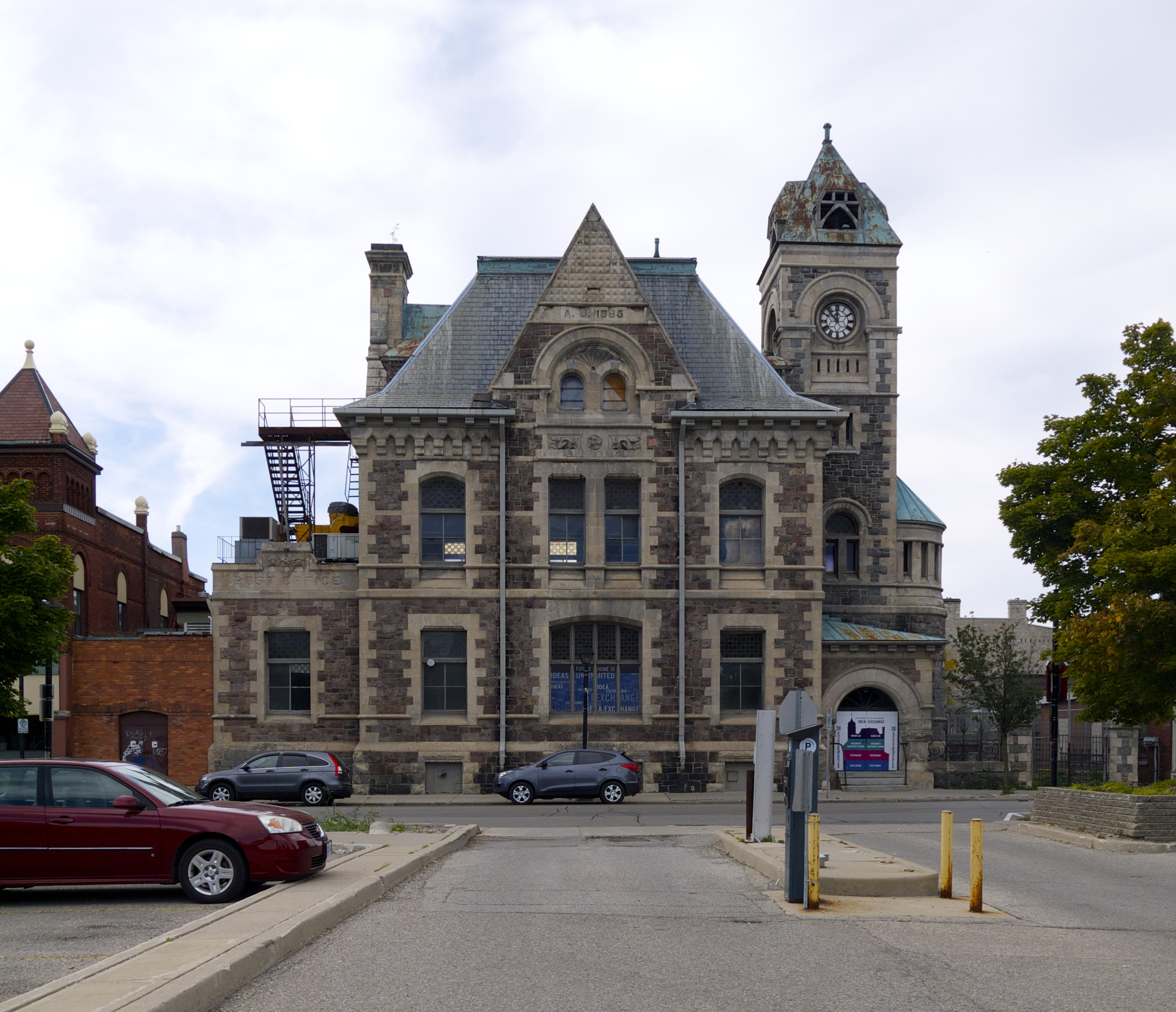
The former Galt post office, which was completed in 1887, has been designated as a National Historic Site as an example of a small urban post office.

Building	Year Completed	Builder/architect	Location
Hillard House	1880		Waterloo
Kuntz Eckert House	1880		Waterloo
Seagram-Remax Admin Building	1881		Waterloo
Central Block	1881	William Snider and Aaron Kraft	Uptown Waterloo
Bean-Wright House	1882		Waterloo
Bank of Hamilton–CIBC Building (part of former Germania Block)	1885	Jakob Fellman	Kitchener
King Edward Public School	1885		Kitchener
Button Factory	1886		Waterloo
D. Hibner Furniture Co. Ltd	1887	Daniel Hibner, Mayor	Kitchener
Former Galt Post Office	1887	Thomas Fuller	Galt (Cambridge)
Electrohome building (152 Shanley St)	1887		Kitchener

== 1890s ==
Building	Year Completed	Builder	Location
Zimmerman House, which changed to the Waterloo Hotel	1890		Waterloo
The Walper Hotel	1893		Kitchener
1115 Doon Village Road	1894	David Cole	Doon (Kitchener)
Simpson Block	1895		Kitchener
Kitchener railway station	1897		Kitchener
152 Shanley Street	1898		Kitchener
Schiel Patterson House	1898		Waterloo
Galt Canadian Pacific Railway Station	1898–99	Edward Maxwell	Galt (Cambridge)
William Street Pumping Station	1899		Waterloo

== 1900s ==
Building	Year Completed	Builder	Location
Berlin and Waterloo Street Railway Car Barn & Power House (25 Madison Avenue North)	1902		Kitchener
Haas–Pemberton House	1903		Waterloo
Snyder Seagram House	1903		Waterloo
St. Mary's Roman Catholic Church	1903	A. W. Holmes of Toronto - architect, Caspar Braun - masonry, William Forwell - carpentry	Kitchener
Waterloo Carnegie Library	1903–1905		Waterloo
Kaufman Shoe Factory	1908		Kitchener

== 1910s ==
Building	Year Completed	Builder	Location
150 Water Street South	1910		Kitchener
Waterloo railway station	1910		Waterloo
Weber Block	c.1910	I. S. K. Weber	Kitchener
Victoria Public School	1911		Kitchener
Berlin Isolation Hospital (69 Highland Road East)	1911–12	Charles Edward Cowan (architect)	Kitchener
Berlin Isolation Hospital Smallpox Pavilion (77 Highland Road East)	1911–12	Charles Edward Cowan (architect)	Kitchener
Greenbrook Pumping Station Reservoirs 1 and 2	1912		Kitchener
Mutual Life Insurance Company of Canada	1912	Frank Darling	
Waterloo Post Office	1911–1913	D. Eward (Chief Architect for Canada), L. B. Lachance of Ottawa (contractor)	Waterloo
Berlin Isolation Hospital Caretaker's Residence (79 Highland Road East)	1913	Unknown architect	Kitchener
19 Regina Street North	1913		Waterloo
Rumpel Felt Company	1913		Kitchener
Molson's Bank	1914	Langley and Howard	Waterloo
Doon Heritage Village	1914		Doon (Kitchener)
Waterloo Isolation Hospital (172 Lincoln Road)	c. 1917	Architect unknown	Waterloo
Sacred Heart Roman Catholic Church	1918		Kitchener

== 1920s ==
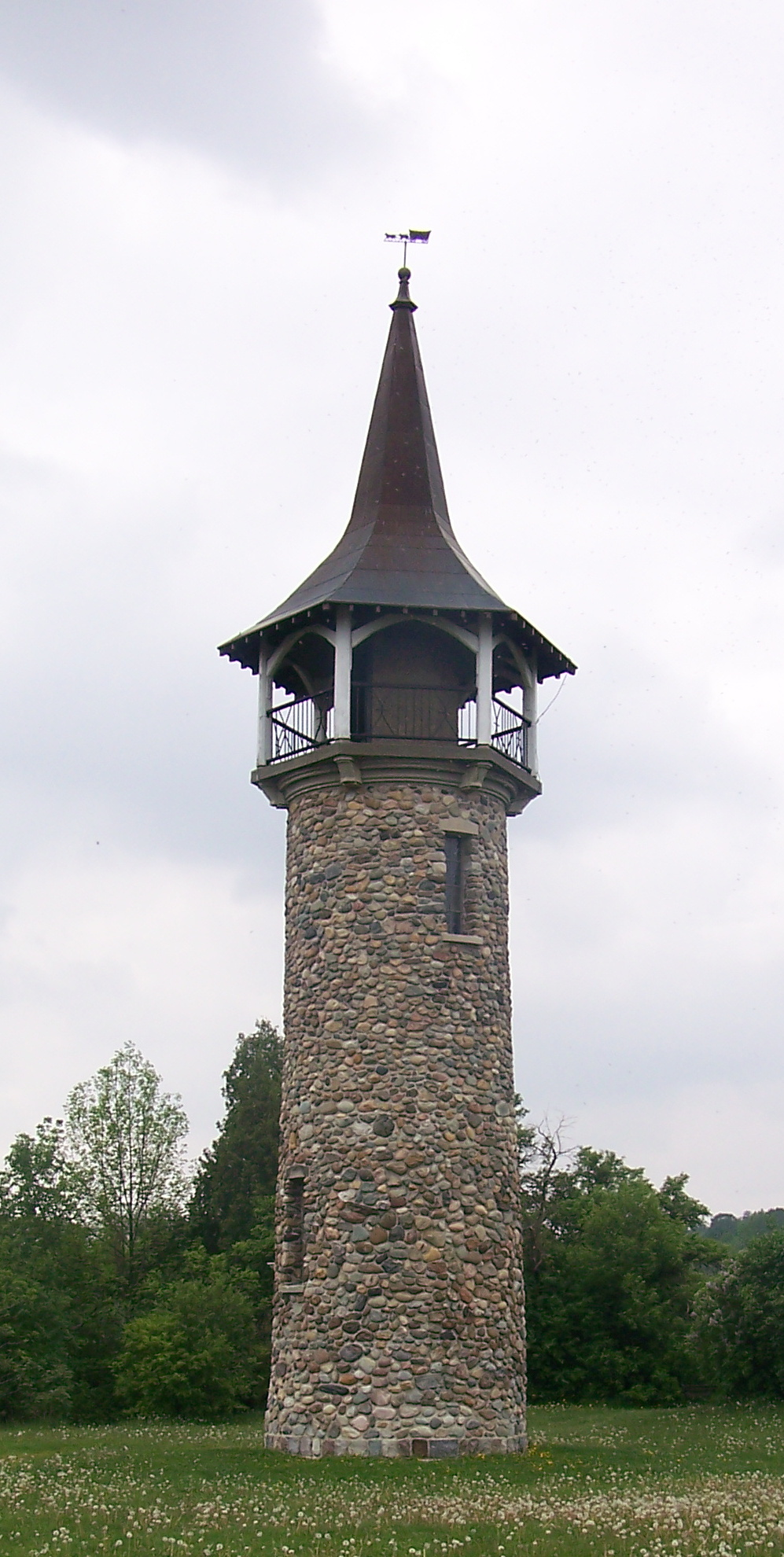
The Pioneer Memorial Tower is recognized as a historic cultural site which represents the area's German pioneer heritage.

Building	Year Completed	Builder/architect	Location
Duke Street Hydro‐Electric Sub Station (296 Duke Street)	c.1920		Kitchener
Grand River Hospital Nurses' Residence	1921		Kitchener
Galt Public Utilities Commission Building	1922	F. C. Bodley	Galt (Cambridge)
Strange Street Pumping Station	1922–23		Kitchener
Waterloo Pioneer Memorial Tower	1923		Kitchener
Bahnsen-Bierstick-Marsland House	1923		Waterloo
old City Hall's clock tower	1924		Kitchener
St. Mary's Hospital	1924		Kitchener
Reitzel-Grierson House	1925		Waterloo
Schmaltz Apartments (96 Young Street)	c.1925		Kitchener
Freeport Bridge	1926		Freeport (Kitchener)
Freeport Sanatorium Nurses' Residence	1926–27	Arthur C. Torry (architect)	Freeport (Kitchener)
Kaufman Shoe Factory	1927		Kitchener
Greenbrook Pumping Station Pump House, K1 and K2 Well Houses	1929		Kitchener

== 1930s ==
Building	Year Completed	Builder	Location
Freeport Sanatorium Main Treatment Building	1929–30	B. A. Jones (architect) and Dunker Company (contractors)	Kitchener
Elizabeth Ziegler Public School	1930		Waterloo
York Apartments	1928–31	Baldwin & Greene (architects), Casper Braun (contractor)	Kitchener
Woodside Municipal Pool	1931		Kitchener
Kitchener Public Utilities Commission Building	1931–32		Kitchener
Freeport Sanatorium Pump House, Power House and Shed	1932		Kitchener
Hydro Electric Power Commission (HEPC) Building (325 Breithaupt Street)	1933	Bernal Ambrose Jones (architect), Dunker Construction (contractor)	Kitchener
Rockway Golf Course Clubhouse	1935	Stanley Thompson (architect)	Kitchener
Freeport Sanatorium Men's Residence	1935–36		Kitchener
Greenbrook Pumping Station Reservoir 3	1936	Dunker Construction Company	Kitchener
Federal Building (Duke St)	1938	C. D. Sutherland (architect)	Kitchener
Freeport Sanatorium Medical Superintendent's Residence	1938–39	B. A. Jones (architect) and Dunker Company (contractors)	Kitchener
Waterloo County Registry Office (Registry Theatre)	1939	Ray Hall (architect), Dunker Construction (contractor)	Kitchener

== 1950s ==
Building	Year Completed	Builder	Location
Kitchener Trolley Bus Transit Terminal (Rockway Centre)	1950		Kitchener
Kitchener Memorial Auditorium	1950–52	Jenkins & Wright (architects)	Kitchener
Grand River Hospital main building	1952		Kitchener
Eastwood Collegiate Institute	1956		Kitchener
Government of Canada Building	1956–57	Jenkins and Wright (architectural firm)	Kitchener

== Dates unknown ==
Building	Year Completed	Builder	Location
St. Paul's Evangelical Lutheran Church	1889		Kitchener

== See also ==
- List of historic places in Regional Municipality of Waterloo
- List of oldest buildings in Canada
- Architecture of Canada
