= Brubacher House =

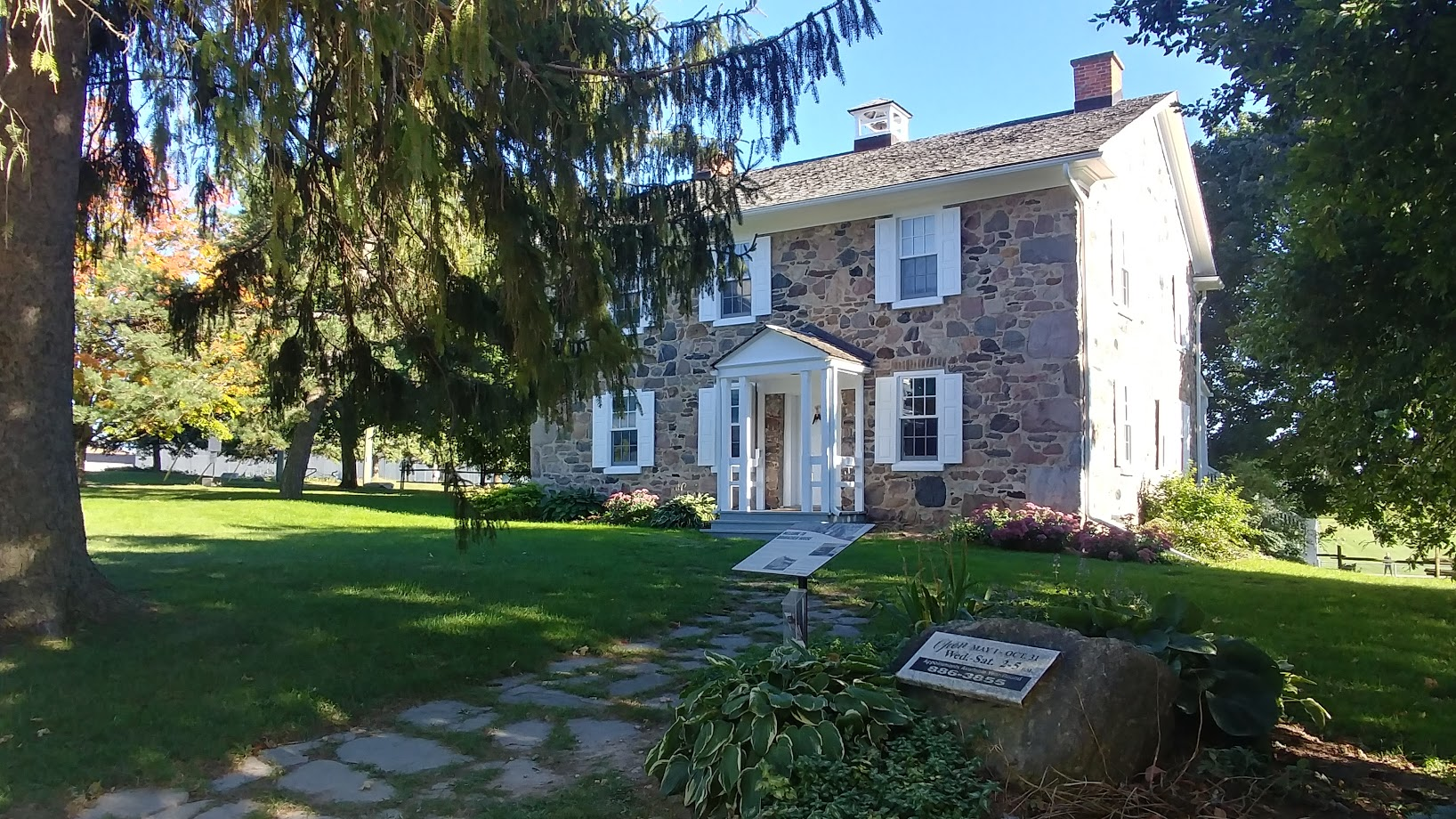
- View of the front face of the house.

- Location within Regional Municipality of Waterloo Location within Southern Ontario
- Former name: John E. Brubacher House
- Established: 1979/06/28
- Location: Frank Tompa Drive, Waterloo, Ontario, Canada
- Coordinates: 43.47555°N 80.55232°W
- Type: Historic house museum
- Owner: University of Waterloo
- Public transit access: GRT 9, 13, 31; University of Waterloo; Research and Technology
- Parking: On site
- Website: uwaterloo.ca/brubacher-house/

Ontario Heritage Act
- Designated: 3 November 1975

Brubacher House is a historic house museum located in Waterloo, Ontario, Canada. It allows visitors to explore the everyday life of Pennsylvania German Mennonite settlers in Waterloo County from 1850 to 1890. The farmhouse is located on the traditional territory of the Attawandaron, Anishinaabeg, and Haudenosaunee Peoples.

Following its construction in 1850, the family of John E. Brubacher and Magdalena (Musselman) Brubacher resided in the home. In 1965, the University of Waterloo purchased Brubacher House. After substantial restorations, the farmhouse opened to the public as a museum in 1979.

== History ==
=== Brubacher heritage and settlement ===
Beginning in the sixteenth century, Mennonites as well as other Anabaptists in various European regions faced persecution for their religious beliefs and practices. Often seeking religious freedom, large populations of South German and Swiss Mennonites relocated to Pennsylvania. Included in this wave of migration were the Brubachers, Mennonites from Switzerland who moved to Lancaster County, Pennsylvania in the early eighteenth century. In the early 1800s, members of the Brubacher family and many other Mennonites living in the United States relocated to Upper Canada in pursuit of farmland. Mary (Brubacher) Eby and her husband Benjamin Eby settled in what would eventually become Waterloo Region in 1807. In 1816, Deacon John E. Brubacher and Susannah (Erb) Brubacher, John's and Mary's widowed mother, joined Mary and her family in Waterloo Region.

Waterloo Region is situated on the traditional territory of the Attawandaron, Anishinaabeg, and Haudenosaunee Peoples and is located on Haldimand Tract. The Haldimand Tract, which consists of ten kilometres of land on both sides of the Grand River, was promised to the Six Nations of the Grand River in 1784 by the Haldimand Proclamation. In 1798, Six Nations leader Joseph Brant (Thayendanegea) surrendered six blocks of land from the Haldimand Tract to the British Crown. It was agreed that the Crown would put the funds generated from the land towards supporting the Six Nations; however, the Crown did not honour their commitment and most to all of the revenue never reached the Six Nations Peoples.

In 1798, businessman Richard Beasley acquired Block Two of the Haldimand Tract, which consisted of 60,000 acres of land that was referred to as Waterloo Township. This area was part of Waterloo County and has since been integrated into Waterloo Region. A group of Mennonites from Lancaster County established the German Company in the early 1800s to jointly purchase Block Two from Richard Beasley. Susannah (Erb) Brubacher was one of the shareholders in the German Company. After the German Company officially acquired the land in 1805, many Mennonites from Pennsylvania relocated to Block Two. Mennonite land purchases and settlement in the Grand River Valley contributed to settler-colonialism in Canada, which causes ongoing harm to Indigenous Peoples.

=== Life in the Grand River Valley ===
Upon their arrival in Waterloo Township, Susannah (Erb) Brubacher and Deacon John E. Brubacher lived on Lot 57 of the German Company's holdings. In 1817, Deacon John E. Brubacher married Catherine Sherk. Susannah returned to Pennsylvania not long after this marriage. Deacon John E. Brubacher and Catherine (Sherk) Brubacher had fifteen children, among them John E. Brubacher, who was born in 1822. In 1846, John E. Brubacher married Magdalena Musselman. The couple resided on Lot 25, where they constructed a large fieldstone farmhouse in 1850. This farmhouse has since become known as Brubacher House. John E. and Magdalena brought up their fourteen children in the home. Magdalena died in 1877, and approximately five years later, John E. married Magdalena's widowed sister Esther Musselman, who had three children from her marriage to her late first husband. John E. lived in Brubacher House until his passing at the age of 82 in 1902.

=== The preservation of Brubacher House ===
The University of Waterloo acquired Brubacher House along with several other Mennonite farmhouses in 1965. University of Waterloo faculty and members of the Mennonite Historical Society of Ontario advocated for the restoration and preservation of one of the homes due to their local historical significance. After the University of Waterloo agreed to take on the project, the inspections of the farmhouses revealed that Brubacher House was best suited for restoration. However, a fire destroyed much of the vacant home's interior in 1968, shortly before the restoration process was due to begin. Despite this setback, efforts to transform the home into a museum carried on. The University of Waterloo, the Mennonite Historical Society of Ontario, and the Waterloo Regional Heritage Foundation all contributed to the restoration process. Simeon Martin, a skilled Mennonite craftsman, along with other members of the local Mennonite community were highly involved in the project. In addition, many local Mennonite families donated artifacts to help furnish the home.

The restored farmhouse was given heritage designation in 1975 by the City of Waterloo under the Ontario Heritage Act, and Brubacher House was opened to the public as a museum in 1979. In 2019, the City of Waterloo recognized Brubacher House as an important local Cultural Heritage Landscape.

== The farmhouse ==
Brubacher House reflects a Pennsylvania German, Georgian building style. Like many other Mennonite homes from the period, Brubacher House was constructed into the side of a hill. The farmhouse is two storeys tall and features a basement that functioned as a summer kitchen. The land surrounding the home was used for agricultural purposes up until it was purchased by the University of Waterloo in 1965. When John E. Brubacher and his family resided in the farmhouse, the farmstead included a walled orchard and a four-square kitchen garden. In recent years, Brubacher House has recreated a traditional, nineteenth century four-square garden on the museum premises.

== Museum information ==
Brubacher House can be found on the University of Waterloo’s North Campus and sits next to the Trans-Canada Trail. The museum is open seasonally for tours. Visitors can explore the kitchen and summer kitchen, pantry, bedroom, and parlour inside Brubacher House. Visitors can also enjoy the grounds and tour the recently added four-square garden. Brubacher House features an artist-in-residence program, which supports artisans and artists in connecting with the local community and engaging in their chosen artistic medium. Additionally, the house hosts community events and provides event space rentals for gatherings.

Live-in museum hosts are responsible for daily operations of the historic house. Brubacher House is owned by the University of Waterloo and operated collaboratively with Conrad Grebel University College and the Mennonite Historical Society of Ontario.

== See also ==
- Conrad Grebel University College
- Schneider Haus
- Doon Heritage Village
- Castle Kilbride
- List of oldest buildings and structures in Kitchener-Waterloo area
