= Walper Hotel =

The Walper Hotel
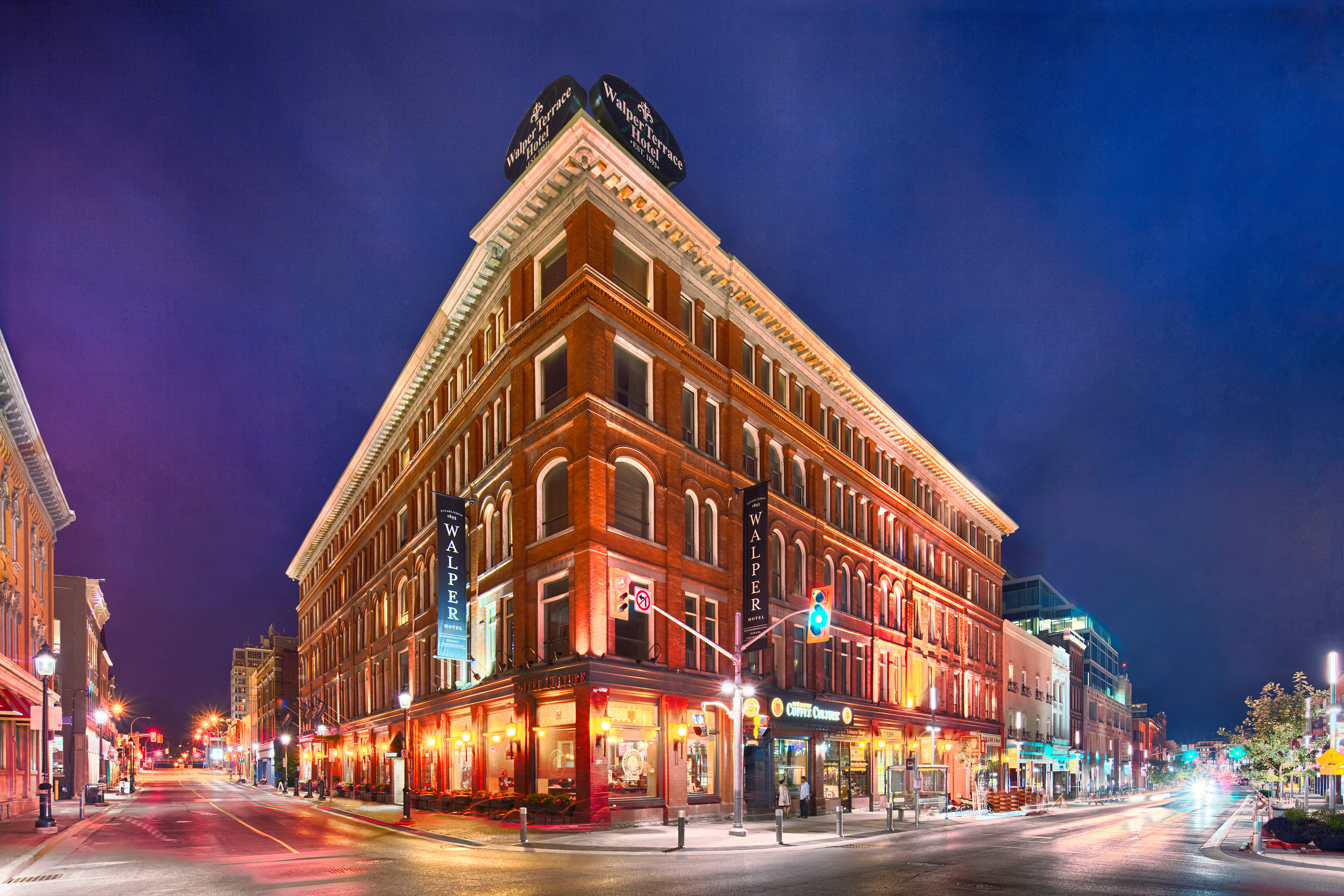

General information
- Type: Hotel
- Location: Kitchener, Ontario, Canada
- Coordinates: 43.4496676°N 80.4896076°W
- Completed: 1893
- Operator: Hyatt Hotels Corporation

Technical details
- Floor count: 5

Design and construction
- Architect: Jonas Knetchel

Website
- www.walper.com

Ontario Heritage Act
- Official name: Walper Terrace Hotel
- Designated: 14 March 1983

The Walper Hotel (formerly Walper House and also known as the Walper Terrace Hotel) is a hotel in Kitchener, Ontario, Canada. The current hotel building was constructed in 1893 for $75,000 after a previous establishment, known as John Roat's Commercial Hotel, burned down in 1892. On 14 March 1983, it received heritage designation by the City of Kitchener under Part IV (Municipal Heritage Designation) of the Ontario Heritage Act.

== History ==
Architect Jonas Knechtel designed and supervised the construction of the Walper Hotel, which opened in 1893. Located at the corner of King and Queen, the building was constructed on the site of the former Varnum Inn, which was built in 1820 on land leased from Joseph Schneider along with a blacksmith shop and stable. In 1836, the Inn was purchased by Friedrich Gaukel who made several additions to the building. It was later sold several times: James Potter operated the inn as the Great Western, followed by John Roat who ran the inn as the Commercial Hotel. C H. (Curry) Walper purchased the building in 1886, continuing to operate the business as the Commercial Hotel until a fire destroyed the building in 1892. Following the fire the land was purchased by Abel Walper, C.H. Walper's father, who hired Knechtel to design what would become the Walper Hotel.

In September 2013, the hotel was bought by the Zehr Group, the Perimeter Development Corporation, David Struke and CK Atlantis Ltd. for $4.6 million. The Hotel was renovated in 2016 and reopened in May and June for weddings and in July for guests. The restoration project involved several architectural firms: Bogdan Newman Caranci for the building base, Dubbeldam Architecture + Design and Jill Greaves Design for suites and guest floors, and Dialogue 38 for lobby and public spaces on the second floor. The renovation cost $3.5 million.

== See also ==
- List of historic places in Regional Municipality of Waterloo
- List of oldest buildings and structures in the Regional Municipality of Waterloo
