= Waterloo Pioneer Memorial Tower =

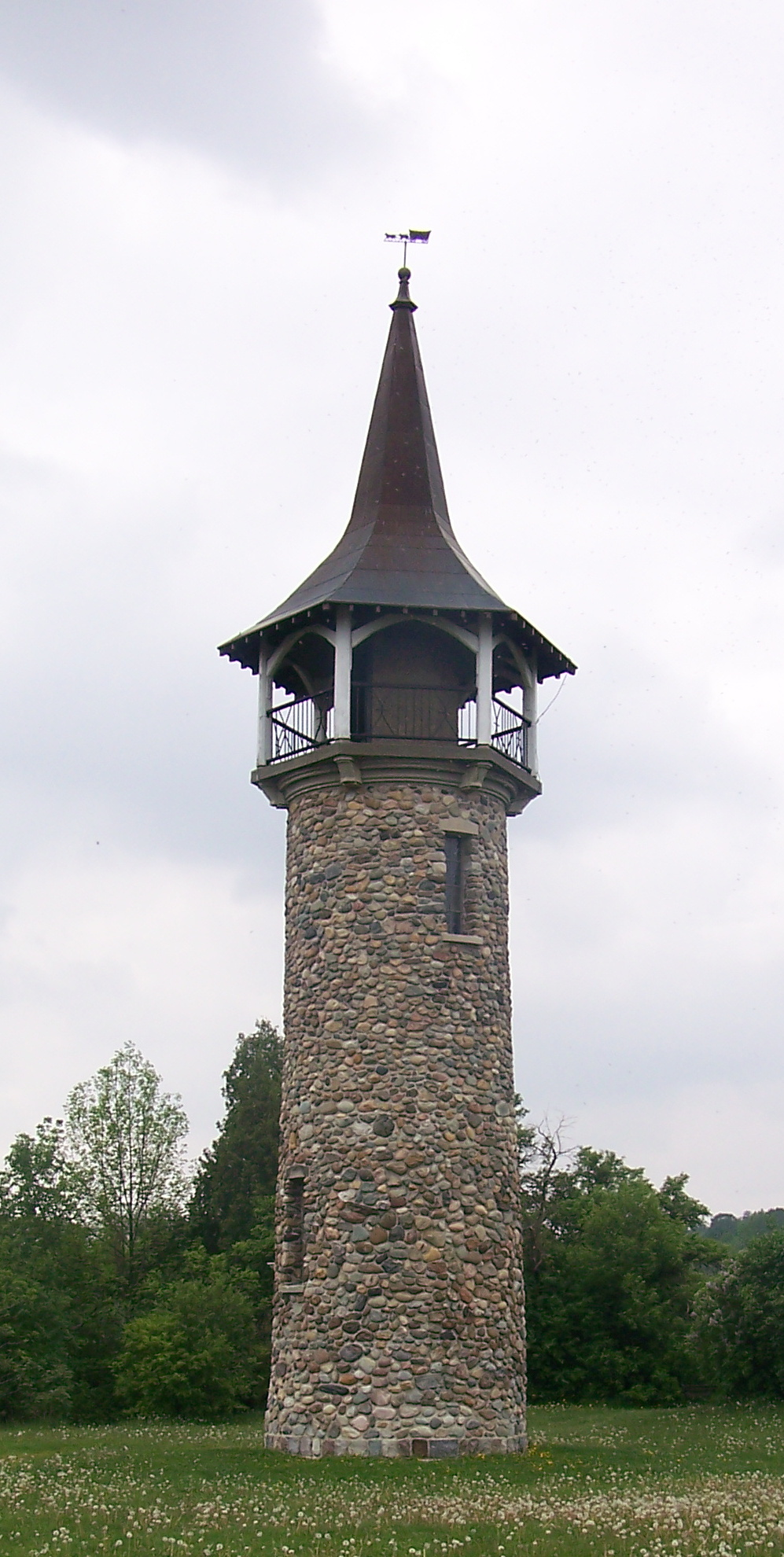
- Interactive map of the Waterloo Pioneer Memorial Tower area

General information
- Type: Memorial tower
- Location: Kitchener, Ontario, Canada
- Coordinates: 43.400142°N 80.416220°W
- Inaugurated: 23 August 1926
- Owner: Parks Canada

Height
- Height: 18.9 metres (62 ft)

Technical details
- Material: Fieldstone

Design and construction
- Architect: William A. Langton

The Waterloo Pioneer Memorial Tower was built in 1926 in Kitchener to commemorate the arrival of the Pennsylvania Dutch to Southwestern Ontario. It was conceived by William Henry Breithaupt, who wanted to heal wounds of nationalism fomented in the city during World War I. This led to increasing anti-German sentiment and an eventual change in the name of the city from Berlin to Kitchener.

The tower overlooks the Grand River on a site once cleared by the first pioneers to settle the area. Its walls consist of fieldstone, its observation deck references the Grand River Trail along which the pioneers travelled, and the roof is topped by a weather vane in the shape of a Conestoga wagon. For many years, it was depicted in the masthead of the local newspaper The Record.

The 18.9-metre-tall (62 ft) tower was designated as a building of historical importance in 1989 and is a Classified Federal Heritage Building that "commemorates the arrival of the Pennsylvania-German pioneers to the Waterloo region between 1800 and 1803".

== Background ==
In the late 1700s and early 1800s, numerous Pennsylvania Dutch immigrated from New York and Pennsylvania to Ontario. They settled in several areas, particularly in what is now the York Region and the three cities of Cambridge, Kitchener, and Waterloo. Among the first of the immigrants were Samuel Betzner and Joseph Schörg or Schoerg (later called Sherk), (Note: Schörg's name is also recorded as Schoerg and Sherk.) who had travelled more than 700 kilometres (430 mi) over 10 weeks in a Conestoga wagon. They arrived in 1800 from Franklin County, Pennsylvania, and established homesteads in a rural area that would eventually become part of Kitchener.

Joseph Schoerg and his wife settled on Lot No.11, B.F. Beasley Black, S.R., on the bank of the Grand River opposite Doon, and Betzner and his wife settled on the west bank of the Grand, on a farm near the village of Blair.

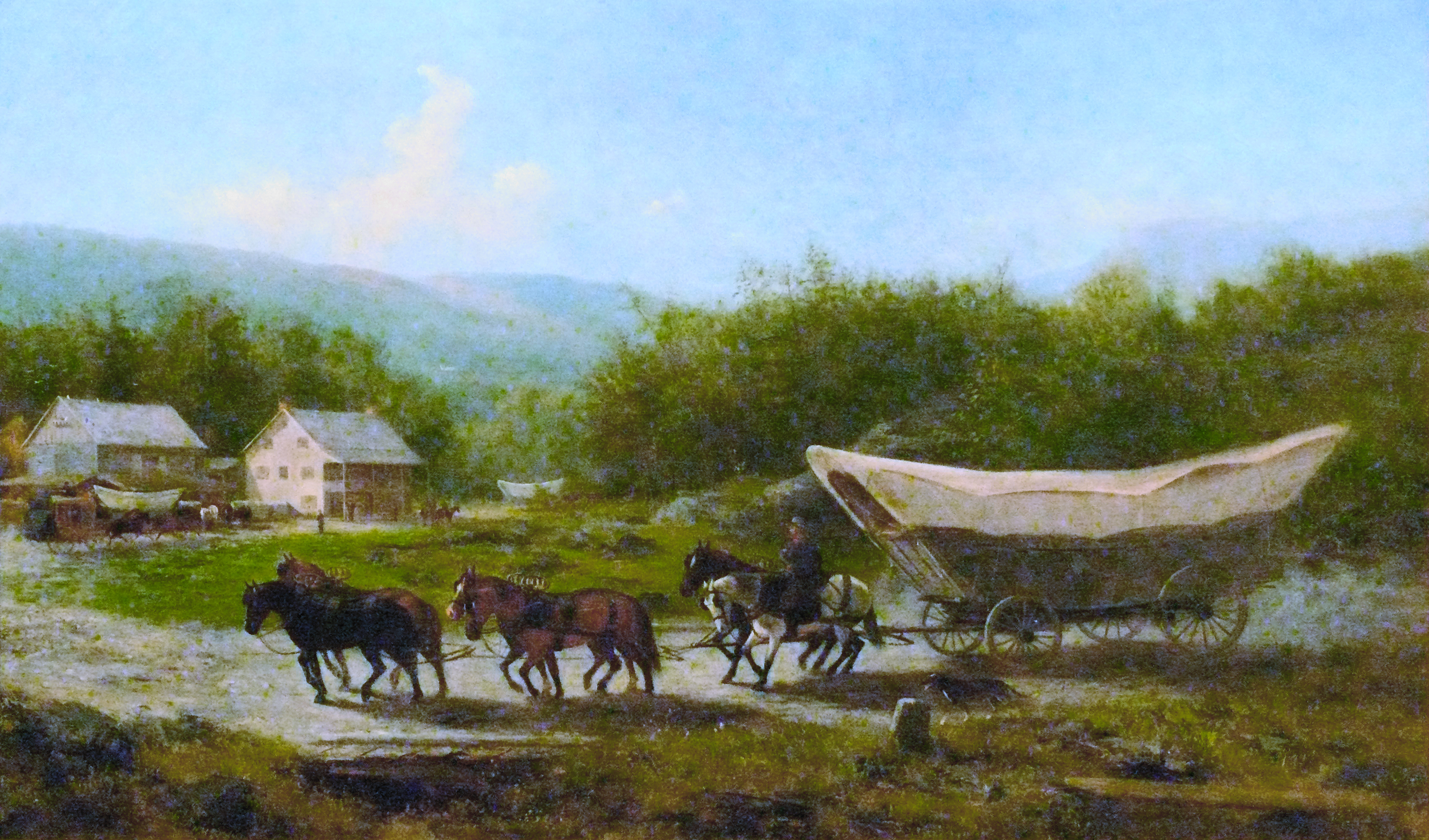
Many of the early settlers from Pennsylvania arrived in Conestoga wagons

The farmsteads built by the next generation of these families still stand, on what is now Pioneer Tower Road in an area often called Doon; the John Betzner and David Schoerg homesteads were erected circa 1830.

By the early 20th century, the city of Berlin (now Kitchener) had become known as "the German Capital of Canada" for its many families of German descent living in the area. The city had a German-language newspaper and schools taught German, with 80% of elementary school students enrolled in optional German classes in 1911. The city had a large manufacturing industry, whose products were stamped with "Made in Berlin, Canada".

During World War I, increasing anti-German sentiment led to mistrust of people of German heritage. The Berlin School Board terminated the teaching of German in its schools, and in 1916, the Berlin Board of Trade suggested the city be renamed. It cited a negative effect of the city's name on business, and that making such a change would symbolize the patriotism of its residents. Despite objections to the proposal, a referendum was scheduled for May 1916.

Supporters of the name change had taken several actions to ensure its success, including having opponents declared aliens, and intimidation tactics to prevent organization of an opposition movement, to deter them from casting a ballot, and from sending sufficient scrutineers to the polls. In the months leading up to the referendum, there was "violence, riots and intimidation, often instigated by imperialistic members" of the 118th (North Waterloo) Battalion of the Canadian Expeditionary Force. In an address to the residents of the city, sergeant major Granville Poyser Blood of the 118th Battalion famously stated "Be British. Do you duty or be despised...Be British or be damned". Blood, a "fearless and fearsome leader", led members of the Battalion in a riot within the city, an act he defended by stating "I have been trained to destroy everything of military advantage to the enemy". The referendum was supported by the majority of the city's residents.

On 28 June 1916, a second referendum was held to choose the new name of the city, which the Berlin News Record described by stating that the "outstanding feature was the absolute indifference displayed by the ratepayers". On 1 September 1916 Berlin officially changed its name to Kitchener.

== History ==
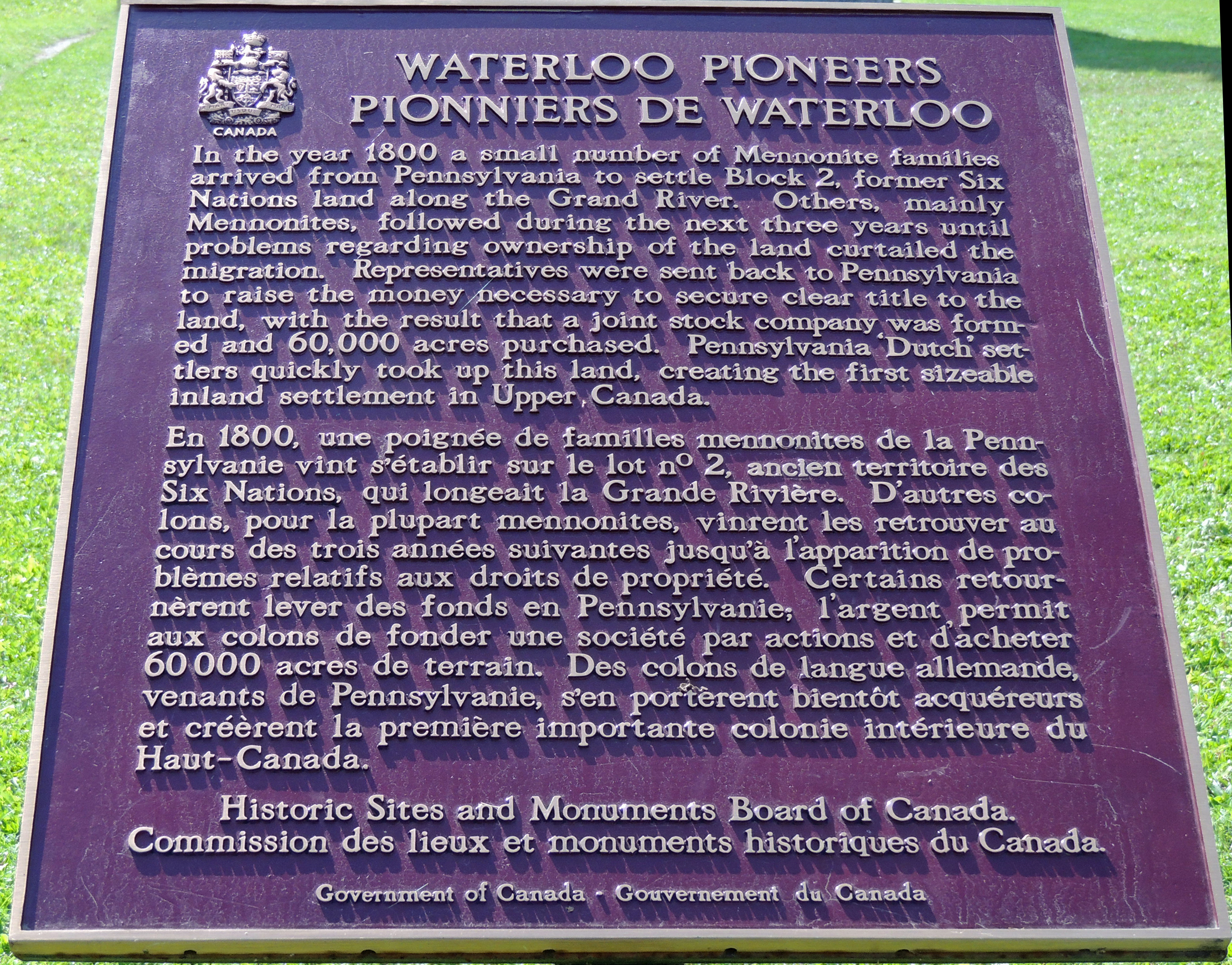
The plaque commemorating the Waterloo Pioneer Memorial Tower as a historic cultural site of Canada.

On 13 July 1923, the Waterloo County Pioneers' Memorial Association was formed with the patronage of the Waterloo Historical Society, and its board of directors included its members and descendants of the first Mennonite families to move to the area. The tower was conceived by William Henry Breithaupt, president of the association, who wanted to commemorate the Mennonites who had moved to the area (and also the first farmers of Waterloo Region), and to heal the wounds of earlier nationalism that led to the city's name change. Breithaupt, according to local historian Rych Mills, "was trying to just re-jig our history a little tiny bit because of all the troubles we went through in World War One." A group petitioned the council of the County of Wellington to build the tower.

The Memorial Association purchased a 1.17 acres (4,700 m^{2}) parcel of land that had been part of the Betzner property from Isaac Furtney in January 1924, and construction began in May 1925. Its architect was William A. Langton of Toronto. The cost of $4,500 (equivalent to $63,495 in 2016) was funded via subscription.

The tower commemorates the settlement by the Pennsylvania Dutch (actually Pennsilfaanisch Deitsch or German) of the Grand River area in what later became Waterloo County, Ontario. It was dedicated on 23 August 1926.

== Structure ==
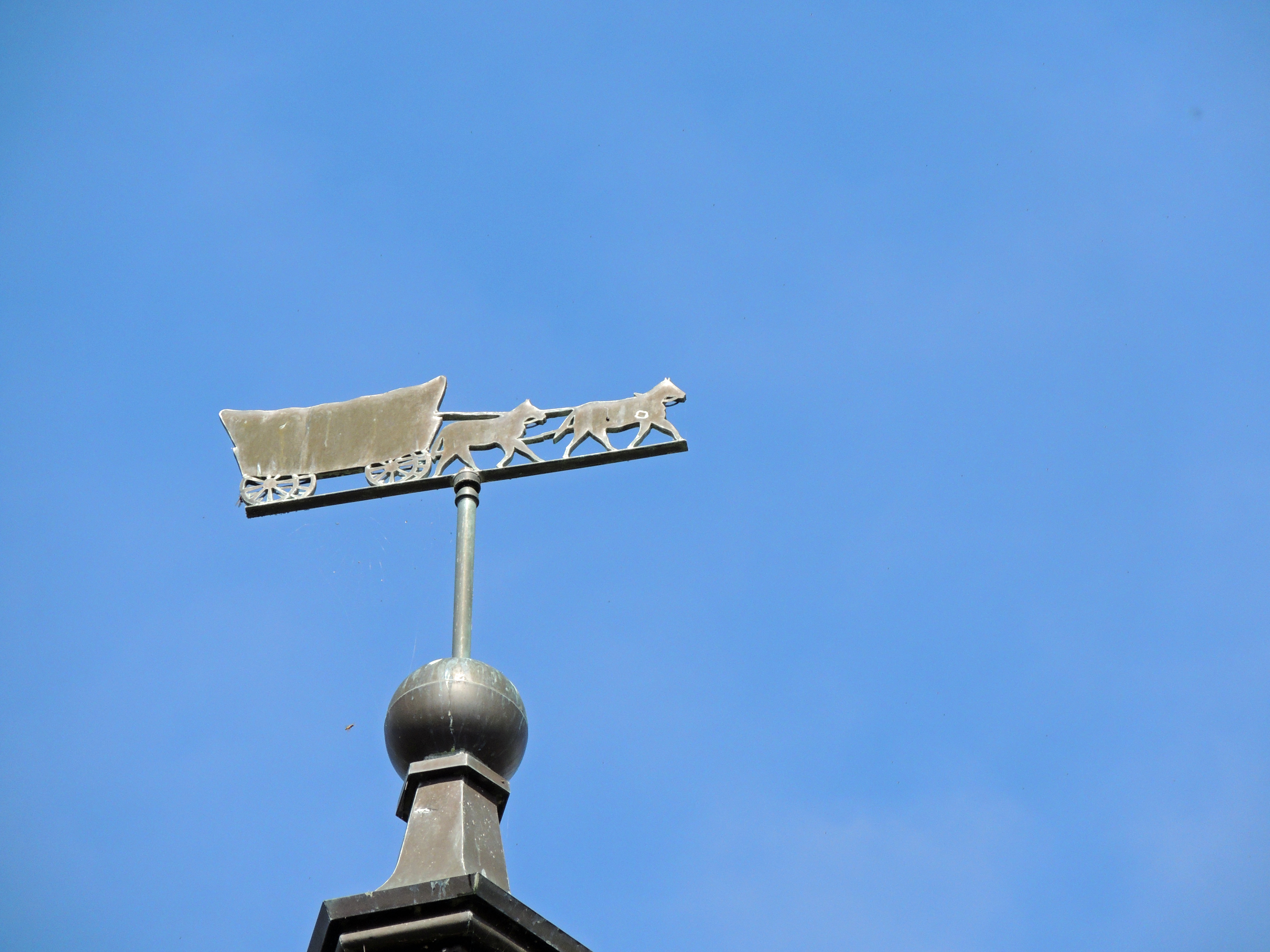
The weather vane, in the shape of a Conestoga wagon, atop the copper roof

The tower was built on a site once cleared by Betzner's son near what is now the Doon neighbourhood of Kitchener. It stands on a ridge overlooking the Grand River, opposite a water treatment plant. The 18.9-metre (62 ft) tapered tower is built of rounded fieldstone, which had been collected over time from the surrounding 200 acres (810,000 m^{2}) of land. It is topped by a weather vane shaped as a Conestoga wagon. In 2009, the weather vane was restored, and the tapered copper roof was replaced.

The weather vane and roof reflect the Swiss heritage of the early Pennsylvania Dutch settlers. The design of the observation deck integrates references to true north, and the Grand River Trail along which the first immigrants travelled to settle the area.

== Legacy ==
For many years, the tower was included in the masthead (Note: Also known as a nameplate.) of The Record. Archival documents regarding the tower's conception, construction, and dedication are stored at the Kitchener Public Library in collections MC.55 and MC.113.

The site was acquired by the Historic Sites Branch of the Department of the Interior in 1939, owing to the Waterloo Historical Society lacking the reserve funds to finance its maintenance. It is now owned by Parks Canada, and managed by the Woodside National Historic Site. The site is open to the public, but since 2008 the tower is opened only by request.

== See also ==
- List of historic places in Regional Municipality of Waterloo
- List of oldest buildings and structures in the Regional Municipality of Waterloo
