= Waterloo County Gaol =

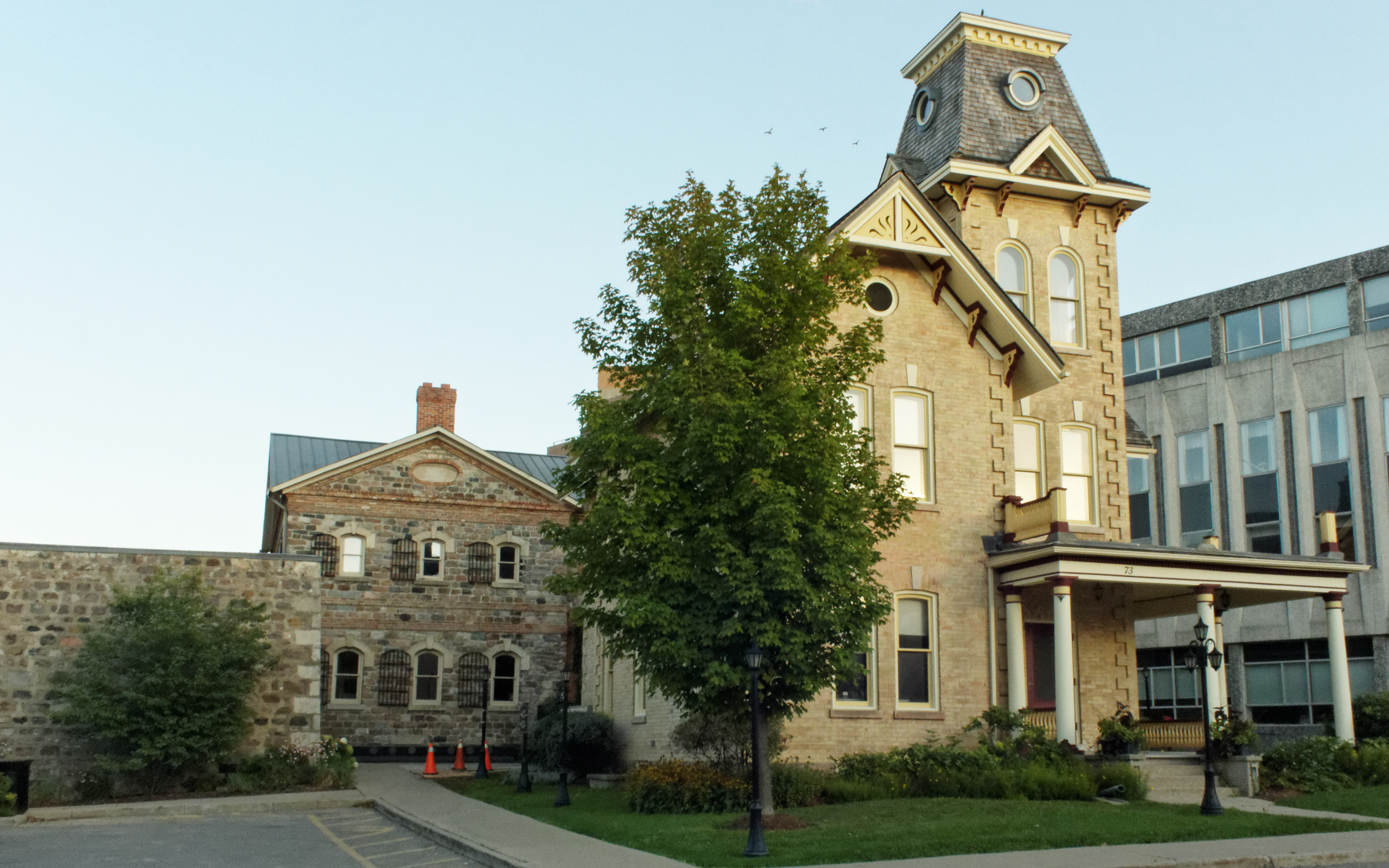
- The governor's house, connected with the former county gaol.
- Interactive map of Waterloo County Gaol
- Type: Prison
- Location: Kitchener, Ontario, Canada
- Coordinates: 43°27′8.1″N 80°29′11.7″W
- Built: 1852-1853
- Architect: David W. Gingerich (Governor's House), Mellish and Russell (Gaol)
- Architectural styles: Victoria Italian Villa Style, Classic Revival

Ontario Heritage Act
- Designated: 1981

The Waterloo County Gaol, located in Kitchener, Ontario, is a retired prison and historic site. Constructed in 1852, it is the oldest government building still-standing in the city. The Governor's House, home of the "gaoler", in a mid-Victorian Italian Villa style, was added in 1878. Both have been on Canadian Register of Historic Places since 27 March 2008. Both buildings have been extensively restored. They are located at 73 Queen Street North, Kitchener, Ontario beside the new Court House.

== History ==
The precursory requirement for the creation of a county in the 1850s was the presence of a local gaol and courthouse. In deciding the seat of Waterloo County, a seat for which Berlin and Galt were both competing, the presence of such buildings was taken into account. Because Berlin, Ontario (now Kitchener) had a gaol and courthouse, the city became the county seat.

The gaol had been constructed on land donated by hotel owner Frederick Gaukel. Work began in 1852, the year of the inception of Waterloo County, Ontario. It was designed by the architectural firm Mellish and Russell of Brantford, Ontario who used a Classic Revival style. The cost of the construction in 1852 was £4875. For over a century after its completion, the gaol was administered municipally, although this changed after 1968, as the government reformed the administrative system of Ontario's prisons. The addition of the governor's house in 1878, designed by architect David W. Gingerich, served as the gaolor's residence for the next century of the facility's operation.

Closed in 1978 to be replaced by the Waterloo Regional Detention Centre, the building is now a heritage site. After the closing, the building was the subject of a 2002 feasibility study aimed at converting the former prison into an affordable housing project.

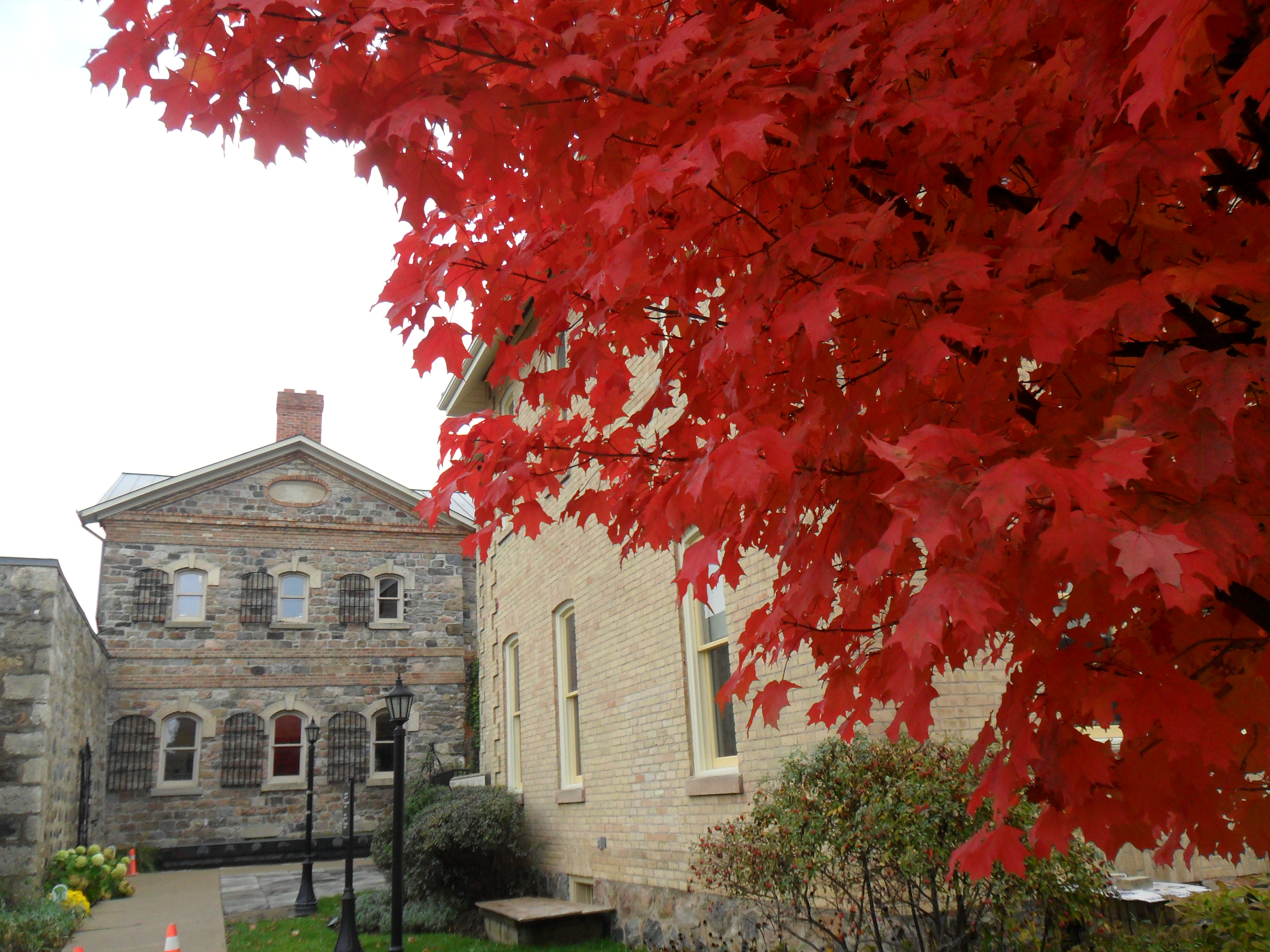
Gaol and Governor's House

Both the house and gaol reopened after major renovations. The section that was the gaol now houses courtrooms while the area that was the house is now the location of the offices of the court and other agencies.

== See also ==
- List of historic places in Regional Municipality of Waterloo
- List of oldest buildings and structures in the Regional Municipality of Waterloo
