= Huether Hotel =

Historic building in Waterloo, Ontario

Coordinates: 43.46694°N 80.5232°W

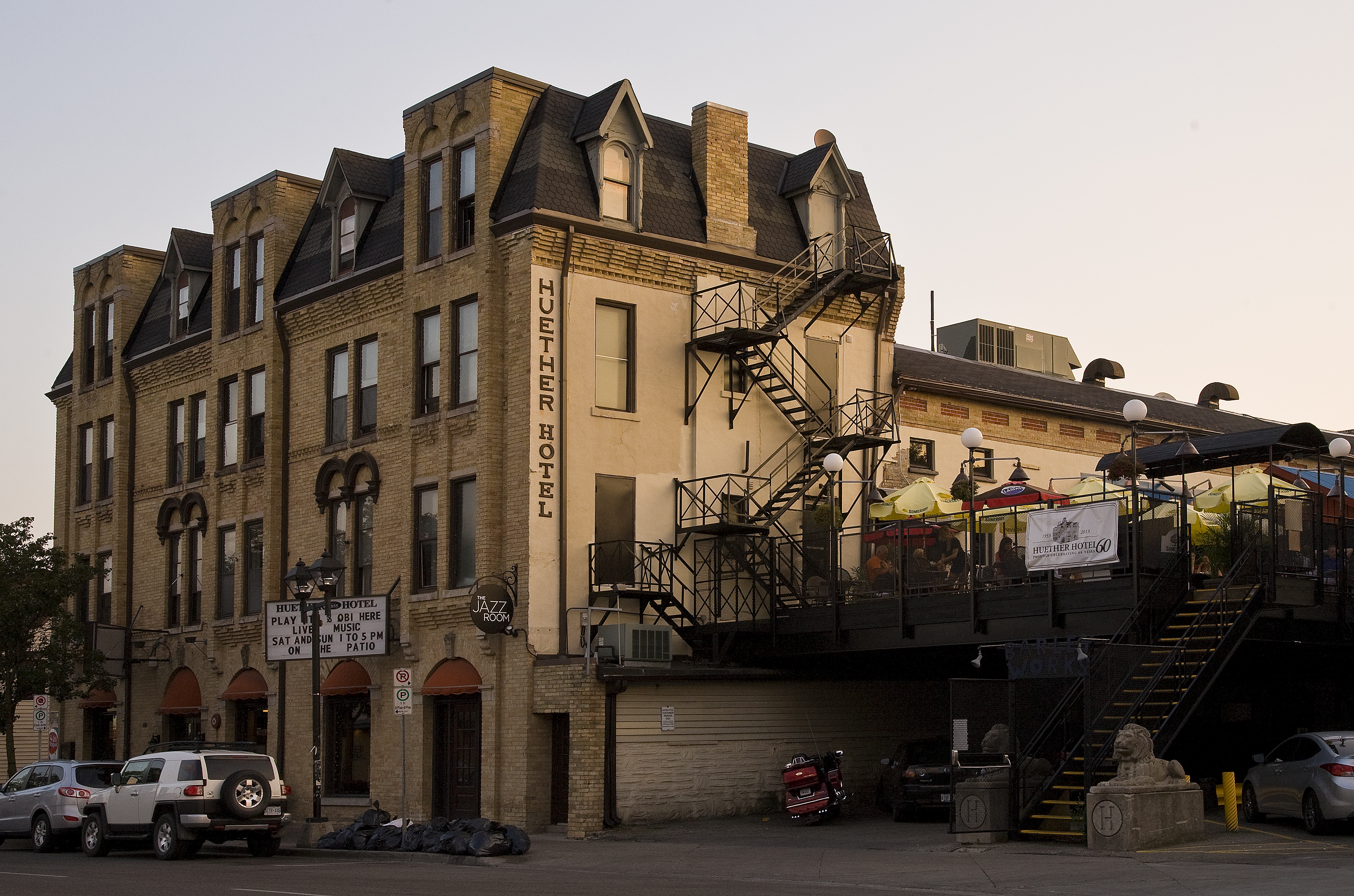
- Huether Hotel viewed from the north-east in 2013
- Interactive map of the Huether Hotel area
- Former names: Kuntz Brewing Company, Ewald House, Hotel Kent

General information
- Architectural style: High Victorian
- Location: Waterloo, Ontario, 59 King Street North
- Opened: 1855
- Owner: Adlys Family

Technical details
- Structural system: Brick and Stone
- Floor count: 4

Design and construction
- Designations: Municipal Heritage Designation (Part IV)

Website
- www.huetherhotel.com

The Huether Hotel (also known as Ewald House from 1911–1934 and Hotel Kent from 1934–1980s) is a historic building in Waterloo, Ontario, Canada. Originally built in 1855, renovations beginning in the 1870s established the building in the High Victorian style. Starting as a hotel and home for the Lion Brewery, the building today houses a café, restaurant and pub with the brewery now located next door.

== History ==
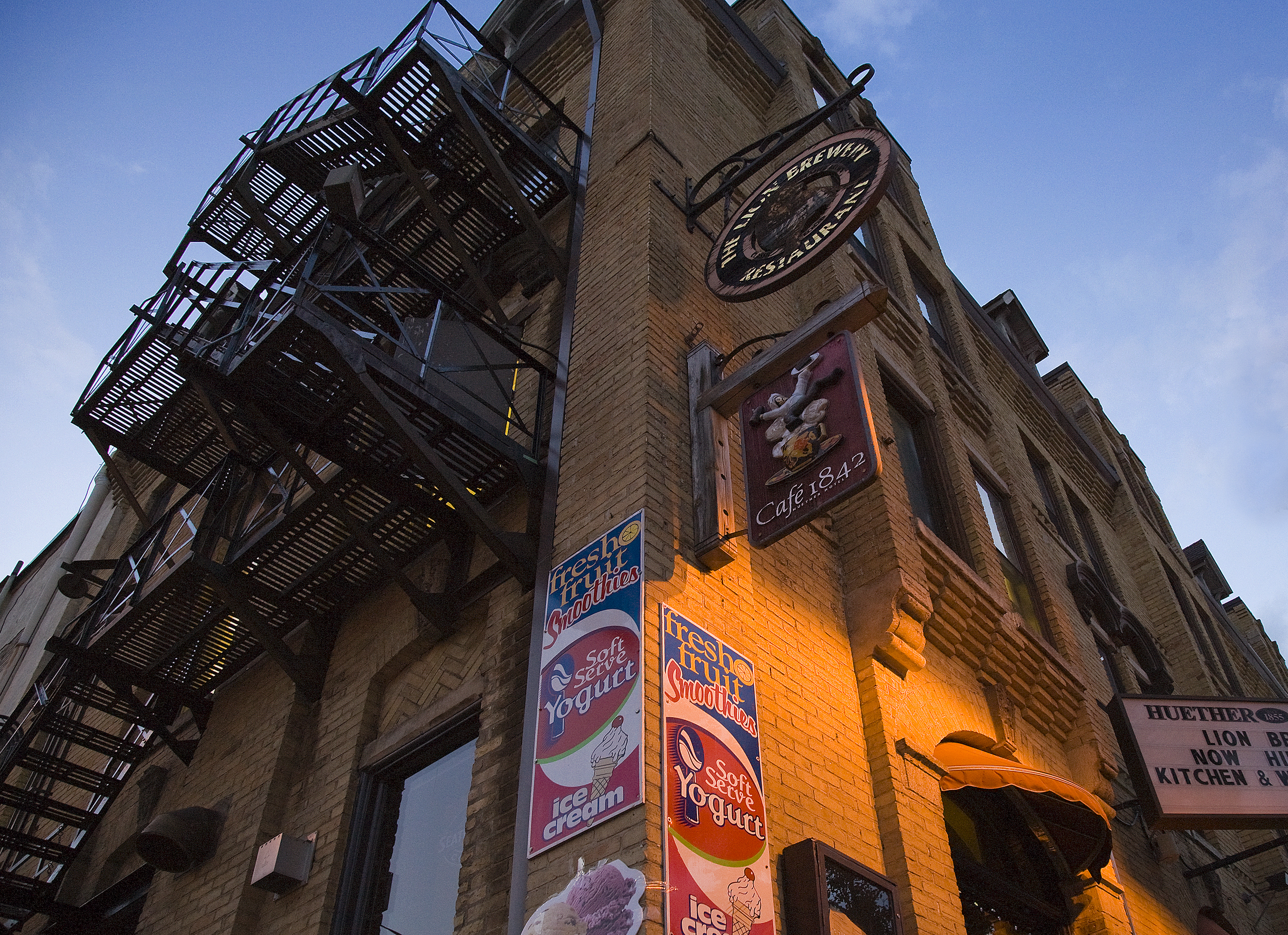
The south-east corner of the Huether Hotel in 2013

In 1844, cooper David Kuntz of Wiesbaden, Germany established a brewery at the present day location of the Huether Hotel, one of four breweries in the village of Waterloo, Ontario. In the mid-1850s, he moved to start the Spring Brewery at the corner of King and William Streets. In 1856, Adam Huether of Baden, Germany arrived in Waterloo, taking the business over and renaming it the Lion Brewery.

A small hotel was built in 1855 with most of the existing building having been built in 1870. In the 1880s, Huether's brother Christopher expanded the hotel with a new mansard roof and iron cresting, made in the same style as the new Waterloo Town Hall. More renovations were carried out in the 1890s, adding a façade on King Street with stone-capped arched windows, an Etruscan tower and several balconies overlooking King and Princess Streets. These renovations established the building in the style of High Victorian. The hotel possessed forty "well-lighted" rooms and seven parlours, renting rooms for one dollar per day, and advertised their menu as having "all the delicacies of the season, as well as the substantials. [sic]" The Lion Brewery advertised its beer as having "a widespread reputation through Perth and Waterloo counties."

Christopher Huether died in 1898, and the brewery and hotel were auctioned off to Theresa Kuntz the following year. The Kuntz Brewing Company owned the building until 1930, while the hotel portion had several different proprietors, changing its name in 1911 to Ewald House. The building changed hands several times until Albert Snyder acquired the land, the building and the hotel business it in 1934, renaming it to the Hotel Kent. The Adlys family acquired the building in 1953 and later restored it, with the City of Waterloo designating it for its heritage value in 1988 under the Ontario Heritage Act. In 1961, the City of Waterloo intended to build a parking lot near the building, inadvertently discovering a previously unknown storage cavern in the building's basement. The cavern features a stone ceiling and an arched entrance. The Adlys changed the building's name back to the Huether Hotel in the 1980s. The Huether no longer operates as a hotel but as the Lion Brewery Restaurant, Barley Works Pub and Grill, (which operates on an elevated metal platform over the parking lot which was added in a 2006 renovation) and Cafe 1842. The Lion Brewery continues to operate and supply the restaurant from next door.

Beginning in 1857, Waterloo used a ceremonial cannon to fire a 21 gun salute each 24 May to celebrate Queen Victoria's birthday. The annual salute was temporarily stopped and moved to a safer location after a cannon "discharged prematurely, and the hardwood ramrod, with the force of a cannon ball, killed a man who was watching the proceedings outside Huether's Hotel [sic] two blocks away, severing the head from the body."

== See also ==
- List of historic places in Regional Municipality of Waterloo
- List of oldest buildings and structures in the Regional Municipality of Waterloo
