= Baden, Ontario =

Baden
- Suburban Community
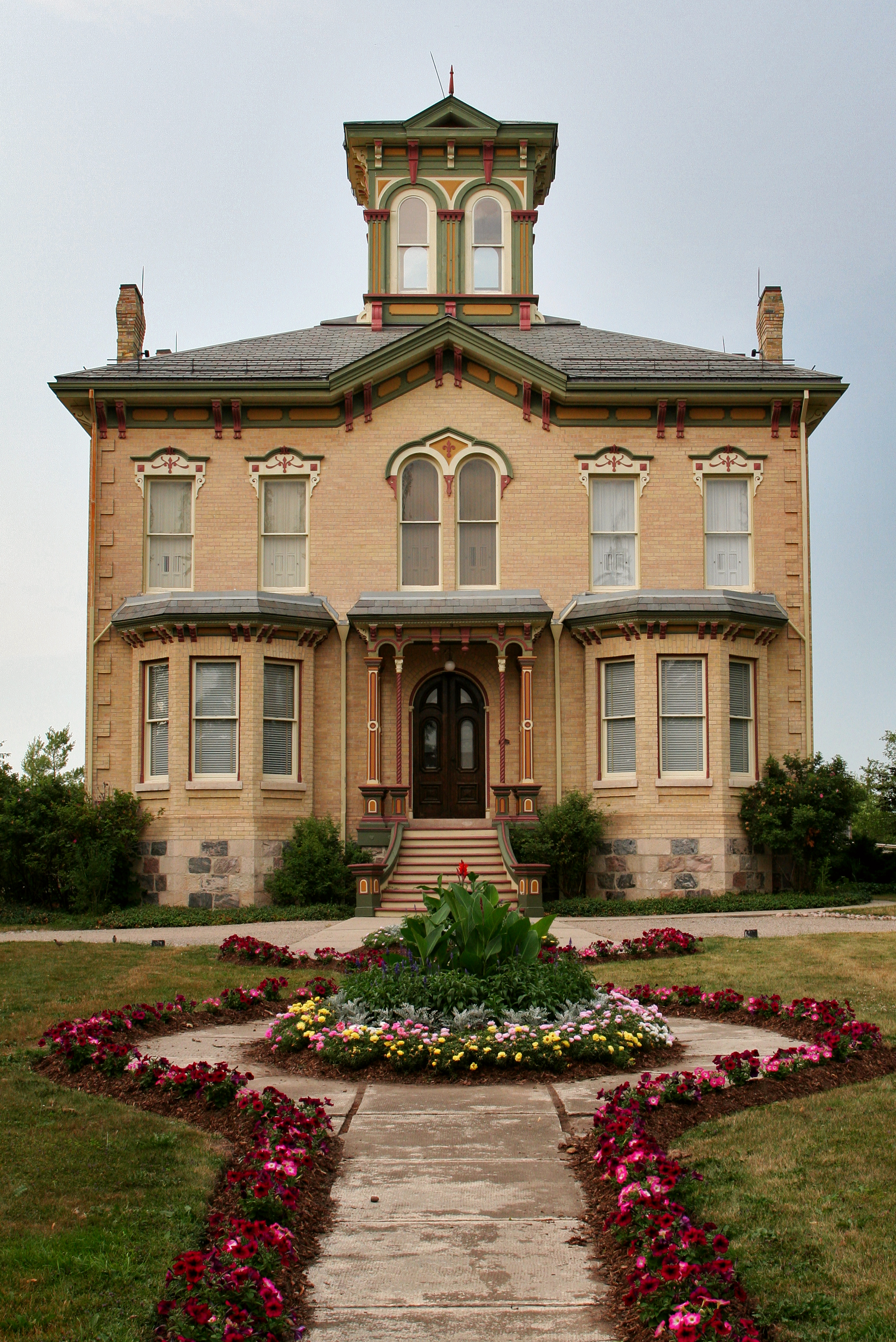
- Front facade and path to Castle Kilbride in Baden

- Location within Regional Municipality of Waterloo Location within Southern Ontario
- Coordinates: 43°24′09″N 80°40′07″W
- Country: Canada
- Province: Ontario
- Regional municipality: Waterloo
- Municipality: Wilmot
- Elevation: 352 m (1,155 ft)
- Time zone: UTC-5 (Eastern Time Zone)
  - Summer (DST): UTC-4 (Eastern Time Zone)
- Postal code FSA: N3A
- Area codes: 519, 226, 548
- CGNDB key: FEGDI

Baden (/ˈbeɪdɛn/ BAY-den) is a community and unincorporated place in Township of Wilmot, Regional Municipality of Waterloo in Southwestern Ontario, Canada. It was named after Baden-Baden, Germany; the approximate population as of 2015, as per township statistics, is 4,940.

The area is the site of Baden Tower, a television, radio, and communications tower located on top of one of the Baden Hills, which is the transmitter for CKCO-DT, the CTV affiliate for Kitchener, as well as CFCA-FM and CHYM-FM, which have studios in Kitchener.

Much of the area consists of farmlands and pine forests are in the area. The local high school, Waterloo-Oxford District Secondary School, is located just outside the town and the statue park Prime Ministers Path is located on the grounds adjacent to Castle Kilbride.

== History ==
The first settler in this area was Jacob Beck in 1854; he opened a large flour mill on the Spring Creek. A second flour mill, two saw mills, a flax mill, and an iron foundry also opened in the next twenty years. The settlement was originally called Weissenburg.

The village of Baden founded and established in 1855, was originally named after an old bachelor living in the area. Jacob Beck, born in the Grand Duchy of Baden-Baden, Germany, settled in the village and later renamed Baden in 1854. Baden was also the birthplace of Sir Adam Beck, founder of Ontario's public hydroelectric system.

By 1864, the town had a school and its population was 400.

A historical plaque near Baden honours Christian Nafziger, an Amish Mennonite from Munich, Germany, who arrived in 1822 with about seventy families. With assistance from local Mennonites, he was able to obtain the "German Block" (now Wilmot Township) from the government; many other Amish from Europe settled here.

Baden is home to the historic Castle Kilbride, built in 1877 by James Livingston, co-founder of a successful linseed oil company, who went on to represent the area in the Legislative Assembly of Ontario and the House of Commons of Canada. The home was designed by architect David W. Gingerich, who also designed major projects such as the Mutual Life office block, the Waterloo Town Hall, and the governor's (jailer's) house at the Waterloo County Gaol. In 1993, Castle Kilbride was purchased and restored by Wilmot Township, which spent $6.2 million on the project. The castle was designated a National Historic Site of Canada in 1994 and Wilmot Township's administrative offices and council chamber are housed in an addition to the original building.

Baden was also the home town of Sir Adam Beck, who went on to pioneer hydroelectric power, the visible results being the generation plants located in Niagara Falls. Beck has a park named after him in his hometown, as well as an elementary school within the Waterloo Region District School Board.

=== Prime Ministers Path ===
Baden is home to Prime Ministers Path, a series of bronze sculptures of Canadian prime ministers, designed to have visitors explore the history of the country since Canadian Confederation. The privately funded project was conceived of as a Canada 150 project and has been met with repeated controversy. It was unanimously approved by Wilmot Township councillors in 2016 after attempts to install it in Kitchener's Victoria Park and on the campus of Wilfrid Laurier University failed after public push back about the appropriateness of the project. As of June 2020, statues of Robert Borden, Kim Campbell, William Lyon Mackenzie King, John A. Macdonald, and Lester B. Pearson have been installed. Several of the designs include Easter eggs as nods to notable events or aspects of a prime minister's life.

The statue of Sir John A. Macdonald, the first to be installed, was put in place June 2016. Titled 'A Canadian Conversation', the piece was sculpted by Wilmot artist Ruth Abernethy. It had previously been installed on the Laurier campus, but was removed and relocated after concerns were raised about Macdonald's role in creating the Canadian Indian residential school system. Controversy regarding the statue project was raised again in June 2020, following the dousing of Macdonald's statue in red paint, an act that coincided with the celebration of National Indigenous Peoples Day. A statue of Macdonald had been vandalized with red paint the week prior in Charlottetown, Prince Edward Island. The incidents followed a number of similar occurrences across North America tied to calls for the removal of monuments and memorials following the murder of George Floyd in Minneapolis, Minnesota.

Wilmot mayor, Les Armstrong, defended the Prime Ministers Path expressing frustration with people who failed to do their research about Macdonald, noting the prime minister had a number of Indigenous friends. Statue creator Ruth Abernathy acknowledged the incident raised important questions about who is deemed worthy of a statue, but cautioned against "sanitizing public spaces". Cree-Métis educator Lori Campbell challenged the ability of public statues to raise awareness about history due to lack of contextual information. Campbell positioned museums as better and safer spaces for these types of installations, calling their presence in open spaces "painful".

== Amenities ==
The Region of Waterloo Library operates a branch at 115 Snyder's Road East, beside the community mailboxes.

== Local religious congregations ==
- Steinmann Mennonite Church
- Wilmot Mennonite Church
- St. James Evangelical Lutheran Church

== Transportation ==
The Grand Trunk Railway originally built its rail line to Southwestern Ontario in the mid-19th century, with a station in Baden, which existed until at least the 1950s. This line still exists as the CN Guelph Subdivision, which runs from the Park Street bridge in Kitchener (continuing east as the Metrolinx Guelph Subdivision) to London Junction in London, Ontario, where it connects to the CN Dundas Subdivision immediately after crossing over the CP Galt Subdivision. Baden is the location of a rail siding on the Guelph Subdivision, as well as an industrial spur constructed by Pestell Group. Baden is not currently served by passenger rail, though Wilmot Township has set aside land for a possible future GO Transit layover facility and station in Baden. The nearest passenger station is Kitchener station, which is served by both Via Rail Corridor and GO Transit Kitchener line trains.

== See also ==
- List of unincorporated communities in Ontario
