= List of historic places in Regional Municipality of Waterloo =

This is a list of historic places in Regional Municipality of Waterloo, Ontario, containing heritage sites listed on the Canadian Register of Historic Places (CRHP), all of which are designated as historic places either locally, provincially, territorially, nationally, or by more than one level of government.

== List of historic places ==
Name	Address	Coordinates	Government recognition (CRHP №)	Wikidata ID	Image
Armoury	Ainslie Street South; Cambridge ON	43°21′29″N 80°18′49″W	Federal (4685)		More images
Black Bridge	8 Black Bridge Road; Cambridge ON	43°26′58″N 80°18′42″W	Cambridge municipality (10789)		More images
Cambridge City Hall	46 Dickson Street; Cambridge ON	43°21′36″N 80°18′46″W	Ontario (7606)		More images
Cambridge Farmer's Market	40 Dickson Street; Cambridge ON	43°21′36″N 80°18′48″W	Cambridge municipality (9766)		More images
Cambridge Main Street Bridge	Main Street; Cambridge ON	43°21′32″N 80°19′00″W	Cambridge municipality (10817)		
Canadian Pacific Railway Station	10 Malcolm Street; Cambridge ON	43°22′05″N 80°18′56″W	Federal (4524)		More images
Dickson Public School	65 St. Andrew Street; Cambridge ON	43°21′19″N 80°19′15″W	Cambridge municipality (10132)		More images
Duncan Ferguson Homestead	71 Cowan Boulevard; Cambridge ON	43°23′01″N 80°17′39″W	Cambridge municipality (10135)		Upload Photo
First Delta Baptist Church	47 Water Street; Cambridge ON	43°21′25″N 80°18′54″W	Ontario (10487), Cambridge municipality (11221)		More images
Former Galt Post Office National Historic Site of Canada	12-1/2 Water Street South; Cambridge ON	43°21′36″N 80°18′54″W	Federal (13139)		More images
Ferguson Cottage	37 Grand Avenue South; Cambridge ON	43°21′23″N 80°19′03″W	Cambridge municipality (11218)		More images
Galt Collegiate Institute	210 Water Street; Cambridge ON	43°22′09″N 80°19′02″W	Cambridge municipality (10092)		More images
Galt Fire Department Hall	56 Dickson Street; Cambridge ON	43°21′36″N 80°18′44″W	Cambridge municipality (10093)		
Galt Public Utilities Commission Building	62 Dickson Street; Cambridge ON	43°21′35″N 80°18′42″W	Cambridge municipality (10095)		More images
Hespeler Town Hall	11 Tannery Street East; Cambridge ON	43°25′51″N 80°18′34″W	Cambridge municipality (11634)		
Landreth Cottage	84 Water Street South; Cambridge ON	43°21′44″N 80°18′55″W	Cambridge municipality (13719)		
Middleton Water Pumping Station	60 Middleton Street; Cambridge ON	43°20′50″N 80°19′06″W	Cambridge municipality (13720)		More images
Morris C. Lutz House	60 Water Street North; Cambridge ON	43°21′41″N 80°18′55″W	Cambridge municipality (9895)		
Pioneer Pergola	St. Andrews Street; Cambridge ON	43°21′19″N 80°19′15″W	Cambridge municipality (11891)		More images
Riverside Park Gates	King Street E. Cambridge ON	43°24′01″N 80°21′59″W	Cambridge municipality (15304)		
39 Doon Valley Drive	39 Doon Valley Drive; Kitchener ON	43°23′23″N 80°24′55″W	Kitchener municipality (10685)		More images
41 Bloomingdale Road	41 Bloomingdale Road; Kitchener ON	43°28′54″N 80°28′33″W	Kitchener municipality (14882)		Upload Photo
45 King Street West	45 King Street West; Kitchener ON	43°27′N 80°29′W	Kitchener municipality (15112)		
150 Water Street South	150 Water Street South; Kitchener ON	43°26′51″N 80°29′53″W	Kitchener municipality (9990)		More images
883 Doon Village Road	883 Doon Village Road; Kitchener ON	43°23′28″N 80°26′24″W	Kitchener municipality (14885)		
307 Queen Street South	307 Queen Street South; Kitchener ON	43°26′47″N 80°29′33″W	Kitchener municipality (10684)		
3734 King Street East	3734 King Street East; Kitchener ON	43°25′15″N 80°24′35″W	Kitchener municipality (14866)		
Betzner Farmstead	437 Pioneer Tower Road; Kitchener ON	43°24′15″N 80°25′11″W	Kitchener municipality (9069)		
Bridgeport Free Church	76 Bloomingdale; Kitchener ON	43°28′57″N 80°28′25″W	Kitchener municipality (14981)		
Canadian Imperial Bank of Commerce (CIBC) Building	1 King; Kitchener ON	43°26′59″N 80°29′21″W	Kitchener municipality (14965)		
David Weber House	69 Biehn; Kitchener ON	43°23′44″N 80°27′19″W	Kitchener municipality (15109)		More images
Federal Building	15 Duke Street; Kitchener ON	43°27′02″N 80°29′16″W	Federal (4804)		More images
Former Canadian National Railways (VIA Rail) Station	126 Weber Street; Kitchener ON	43°27′22″N 80°29′35″W	Federal (4571)		More images
Freeport Bridge	King Street; Kitchener ON	43°25′23″N 80°24′40″W	Kitchener municipality (8068)		More images
Government of Canada Building	166 Frederick Street; Kitchener ON	43°27′10″N 80°29′01″W	Federal (4268)		Upload Photo
Haalboom Home	1165 Doon Village Road; Kitchener ON	43°23′20″N 80°25′47″W	Kitchener municipality (9217)		More images
Haas-Pemberton House	45 Young Street West; Kitchener ON	43°26′51″N 80°29′53″W	Kitchener municipality (11023)		Upload Photo
Homer Watson House / Doon School of Fine Arts National Historic Site of Canada	1754 Old Mill Road; Kitchener ON	43°23′38″N 80°25′02″W	Federal (1143), Ontario (10497), Kitchener municipality (10969)		More images
Joseph Schneider Haus National Historic Site of Canada	466 Queen Street South; Kitchener ON	43°26′41″N 80°29′41″W	Federal (1145)		More images
Kaufman Rubber Company Ltd.	410 King Street West; Kitchener ON	43°27′09″N 80°29′48″W	Kitchener municipality (15469)		
Public Utilities Commission Building	191 King Street West; Kitchener ON	43°27′04″N 80°29′34″W	Kitchener municipality (15474)		
Registry Theatre	122 Frederick Street; Kitchener ON	43°27′05″N 80°29′10″W	Kitchener municipality (12427)		
St. Jerome's College/High School	120 Duke Street West; Kitchener ON	43°27′08″N 80°29′31″W	Kitchener municipality (15472)		More images
Schoerg Homestead	381 Pioneer Tower Road; Kitchener ON	43°24′22″N 80°24′33″W	Kitchener municipality (9898)		
Shoemaker House	38 Shirk; Kitchener ON	43°28′54″N 80°29′09″W	Kitchener municipality (14964)		Upload Photo
Simpson Block	117 King; Kitchener ON	43°27′02″N 80°29′29″W	Kitchener municipality (14982)		
Sonneck House	108 Queen Street North; Kitchener ON	43°26′55″N 80°29′25″W	Kitchener municipality (15476)		
Stauffer Log House	393 Tilt; Kitchener ON	43°22′38″N 80°26′19″W	Kitchener municipality (15111)		Upload Photo
Steckle Homestead	811 Bleams Road; Kitchener ON	43°24′16″N 80°29′06″W	Kitchener municipality (13245)		Upload Photo
Victoria Public School	25 Joseph Street; Kitchener ON	43°26′55″N 80°29′31″W	Kitchener municipality (15475)		More images
The Walper Hotel	20 Queen St South; Kitchener ON	43°26′59″N 80°29′21″W	Kitchener municipality (10659)		
Waterloo County Jail and Governor's House	73 Queen Street; Kitchener ON	43°27′09″N 80°29′12″W	Kitchener municipality (9216)		More images
Waterloo Pioneer Memorial Tower	300 Lookout Lane; Kitchener ON	43°24′00″N 80°24′59″W	Federal (3297)		More images
Weber Block	37 King; Kitchener ON	43°27′00″N 80°29′24″W	Kitchener municipality (14984)		
Williamsburg School	1385 Bleams; Kitchener ON	43°24′04″N 80°29′57″W	Kitchener municipality (14985)		Upload Photo
Woodside National Historic Site of Canada	528 Wellington Street North; Kitchener ON	43°27′49″N 80°28′50″W	Federal (12767, (9951)		
Woolner Farmstead	748 Zeller Drive; Kitchener ON	43°27′02″N 80°25′22″W	Kitchener municipality (9047)		Upload Photo
Bahnsen-Bierstock-Marsland House	47 Albert; Waterloo ON	43°28′00″N 80°31′28″W	Waterloo municipality (14366)		
Bank of Montreal	3 King; Waterloo ON	43°27′54″N 80°31′21″W	Waterloo municipality (14386)		
Bean-Wright House	73 George Street; Waterloo ON	43°27′50″N 80°31′02″W	Waterloo municipality (10782)		
Burkhardt House	7 Central Street; Waterloo ON	43°28′11″N 80°31′26″W	Waterloo municipality (10802)		
The Button Factory	25 Regina Street; Waterloo ON	43°27′50″N 80°31′15″W	Waterloo municipality (14751)		
Charlie Voelker House	29 Spring Street West; Waterloo ON	43°28′08″N 80°31′34″W	Waterloo municipality (10901)		
Elam Martin Farmstead	Woolwich Street; Waterloo ON	43°31′21″N 80°29′42″W	Waterloo municipality (8064)		Upload Photo
Elizabeth Ziegler Public School	90 Moore Avenue South; Waterloo ON	43°27′55″N 80°30′48″W	Waterloo municipality (9721)		More images
Elsworthy-Elgie House	88 Fountain Street; Waterloo ON	43°28′09″N 80°31′33″W	Waterloo municipality (11033)		
Erb-Kumpf House	172 King Street South; Waterloo ON	43°27′39″N 80°31′12″W	Waterloo municipality (11185)		
Good-Shantz-Bosch House	157 Albert Street; Waterloo ON	43°28′17″N 80°31′46″W	Waterloo municipality (14749)		
Hilliard House	88 William; Waterloo ON	43°27′31″N 80°31′30″W	Waterloo municipality (14446)		
Huether Hotel	59 King Street; Waterloo ON	43°28′01″N 80°31′23″W	Waterloo municipality (8281)		More images
J.E. Seagram's Distillery Administration and Maintenance Buildings	83 Erb Street West; Waterloo ON	43°27′49″N 80°31′37″W	Waterloo municipality (11652)		
John E. Brubacher House	Columbia Street West; Waterloo ON	43°28′22″N 80°33′08″W	Waterloo municipality (9893)	Q96374034	More images
Kuntz-Eckert House	156 King Street South; Waterloo ON	43°27′41″N 80°31′14″W	Waterloo municipality (11679)		
Kuntz-Labatt's House	167 King Street South; Waterloo ON	43°27′39″N 80°31′13″W	Waterloo municipality (11680)		
Market Hotel	12 Dupont Street; Waterloo ON	43°27′58″N 80°31′25″W	Waterloo municipality (14750)		
McLaughlin House	20 Menno Street; Waterloo ON	43°27′46″N 80°31′43″W	Waterloo municipality (11824)		
Mutual Life Assurance Co. of Canada Building	227 King Street South; Waterloo ON	43°27′31″N 80°30′58″W	Waterloo municipality (11829)		
Nixon House	81 Norman Street; Waterloo ON	43°27′30″N 80°31′25″W	Waterloo municipality (11831)		
The Pumping Station	17 William Street; Waterloo ON	43°27′42″N 80°30′21″W	Waterloo municipality (13243)		
Reitzel House	147 Avondale Avenue South; Waterloo ON	43°27′21″N 80°31′24″W	Waterloo municipality (15480)		
Richber House	222 Mary Street; Waterloo ON	43°27′36″N 80°30′59″W	Waterloo municipality (12434)		
Rudy-Snyder House	268 Southampton Place; Waterloo ON	43°26′39″N 80°32′55″W	Waterloo municipality (14752)		
Rummelhardt School	600 Erb Street; Waterloo ON	43°26′54″N 80°33′56″W	Waterloo municipality (12846)		
Schiel-Patterson House	115 William; Waterloo ON	43°27′27″N 80°31′35″W	Waterloo municipality (14576)		
Snyder-Hahn Building	4 King Street South; Waterloo ON	43°26′51″N 80°29′53″W	Waterloo municipality (13168)		
Snyder-Seagram House	50 Albert Street; Waterloo ON	43°28′02″N 80°31′30″W	Waterloo municipality (11870)		
Voelker House	36 Young Street West; Waterloo ON	43°28′06″N 80°31′33″W	Waterloo municipality (10602)		
The Waterloo Hotel	4 King Street; Waterloo ON	43°27′55″N 80°31′21″W	Waterloo municipality (14747)		
Waterloo Post Office	35 King Street North; Waterloo ON	43°27′58″N 80°31′22″W	Waterloo municipality (10594)		
Waterloo Train Station	20 Regina Street South; Waterloo ON	43°27′53″N 80°31′16″W	Waterloo municipality (10593)		
Wissler House	438 Malabar Drive; Waterloo ON	43°30′17″N 80°30′00″W	Waterloo municipality (10658)		Upload Photo
The Ament-Burrell House	70 Arthur Road; Wellesley ON	43°31′15″N 80°37′25″W	Wellesley municipality (15232)		Upload Photo
Forrest House	2086 Perth Line; Wellesley ON	43°28′44″N 80°49′21″W	Wellesley municipality (11627)		Upload Photo
Frenzel-Kuebart House	3851 Weimar Line; Wellesley ON	43°29′16″N 80°40′24″W	Wellesley municipality (15227)		Upload Photo
Hastings Belmont House	4862 William Hastings Line; Wellesley ON	43°31′52″N 80°44′32″W	Wellesley municipality (11631)		Upload Photo
Old School	1137 Henry Street; Wellesley ON	43°28′42″N 80°45′51″W	Wellesley municipality (9896)		
Queen's Tavern	1215 Queen's Bush Road; Wellesley ON	43°28′40″N 80°46′02″W	Wellesley municipality (12078)		More images
Reiner House	19 Doering Street; Wellesley ON	43°28′26″N 80°45′50″W	Wellesley municipality (15218)		More images
St. John's Lutheran Church	4260 Hessen Strasse; Wellesley ON	43°30′32″N 80°42′05″W	Wellesley municipality (9722)		More images
Wellesley Township Hall	4805 William Hastings Line; Wellesley ON	43°31′51″N 80°44′30″W	Wellesley municipality (9720)		
Baden Hotel	39 Snyder's Road West; Wilmot ON	43°24′12″N 80°40′14″W	Wilmot municipality (10080)		More images
Blue Moon	1677 Snyder's Road; Wilmot ON	43°24′49″N 80°36′16″W	Wilmot municipality (9989)		More images
Castle Kilbride	60 Snyder's Road West; Wilmot ON	43°24′12″N 80°40′17″W	Federal (11938), Wilmot municipality (10077)		More images
Christner House	1379 Christner Road; Wilmot ON	43°42′47″N 81°05′06″W	Wilmot municipality (10898)		Upload Photo
Doctor's House	27 Mill Street; Wilmot ON	43°19′07″N 80°31′50″W	Wilmot municipality (10955)		Upload Photo
The Emporium	169 Front Street; Wilmot ON	43°21′05″N 80°32′08″W	Wilmot municipality (13223)		Upload Photo
Gingerich Property	1 Shadybrook Court; Wilmot ON	43°22′39″N 80°31′52″W	Wilmot municipality (10835)		Upload Photo
Hamilton Bank Building	98 Peel Street, New Hamburg; Wilmot ON	43°22′42″N 80°42′34″W	Wilmot municipality (11628)		Upload Photo
Henry Killer Farmstead	2541 Nafziger Road; Wilmot ON	43°24′33″N 80°42′27″W	Wilmot municipality (11633)		Upload Photo
Hostetler House	1145 Christner Road; Wilmot ON	43°23′48″N 80°42′19″W	Wilmot municipality (11650)		Upload Photo
Martini House	1634 Snyder's Road East; Wilmot ON	43°24′47″N 80°36′25″W	Wilmot municipality (11751)		Upload Photo
New Hamburg Heritage Conservation District	Wilmot ON	43°22′41″N 80°42′34″W	Wilmot municipality (11830)		More images
Shantz Country Cupboard	1828 Notre Dame Road; Wilmot ON	43°25′02″N 80°36′33″W	Wilmot municipality (12848)		Upload Photo
Wagler Property	1138 Snyder's Road West; Wilmot ON	43°24′09″N 80°40′38″W	Wilmot municipality (10601)		Upload Photo
Waterlot	17 Huron Street; Wilmot ON	43°22′42″N 80°42′36″W	Wilmot municipality (9049)		More images
William J. Scott House	3332 Bleams Road; Wilmot ON	43°22′42″N 80°40′39″W	Wilmot municipality (9983)		Upload Photo
Zoeller House	2791 Bleams Road East; Wilmot ON	43°22′35″N 80°41′38″W	Wilmot municipality (10605)		Upload Photo
Bristow's Inn	80 Arthur; Woolwich ON	43°35′44″N 80°33′39″W	Woolwich municipality (14579)		Upload Photo
Conestogo United Church	1790 Sawmill Road; Woolwich ON	43°32′27″N 80°29′52″W	Woolwich municipality (10263)		More images
Dunke House	2 William Street; Woolwich ON	43°36′04″N 80°33′27″W	Woolwich municipality (15191)		Upload Photo
Gore Park Bandstand	68 Arthur Street South; Woolwich ON	43°35′50″N 80°33′36″W	Woolwich municipality (10933)		
John B. Snyder House	24 Queensway Drive; Woolwich ON	43°31′59″N 80°33′21″W	Woolwich municipality (11651)		Upload Photo
McDonald House	13 Katherine Street North; Woolwich ON	43°33′36″N 80°28′07″W	Woolwich municipality (11823)		Upload Photo
Steiner Residence	1401 King Street; Woolwich ON	43°32′20″N 80°33′13″W	Woolwich municipality (13190)		Upload Photo
Swope House	52 Hill Street; Woolwich ON	43°35′12″N 80°35′12″W	Woolwich municipality (10053)		Upload Photo
West Montrose Covered Bridge	Covered Bridge Drive; Woolwich ON	43°35′09″N 80°28′54″W	Woolwich municipality (8291)		More images

== See also ==
- List of oldest buildings and structures in the Regional Municipality of Waterloo
- List of historic places in Ontario
- List of National Historic Sites of Canada in Ontario
