= Jonas Knechtel =

Canadian architect

- Born: 1842; Bavaria, Germany
- Died: December 14, 1894; Kitchener, Ontario
- Resting place: Mount Hope Cemetery
- Occupation: Architect
- Buildings: Walper Hotel

Jonas Knechtel was a German-born Canadian architect known for designing buildings in what is today Kitchener, Ontario, including the Walper Hotel.

Knechtel was born in Bavaria, Germany, in 1842. His family immigrated to New York in 1847, where they lived for nine years before settling in Mannheim, Ontario. Together with Susannah (nee Otto) he had twelve children; six girls and six boys.

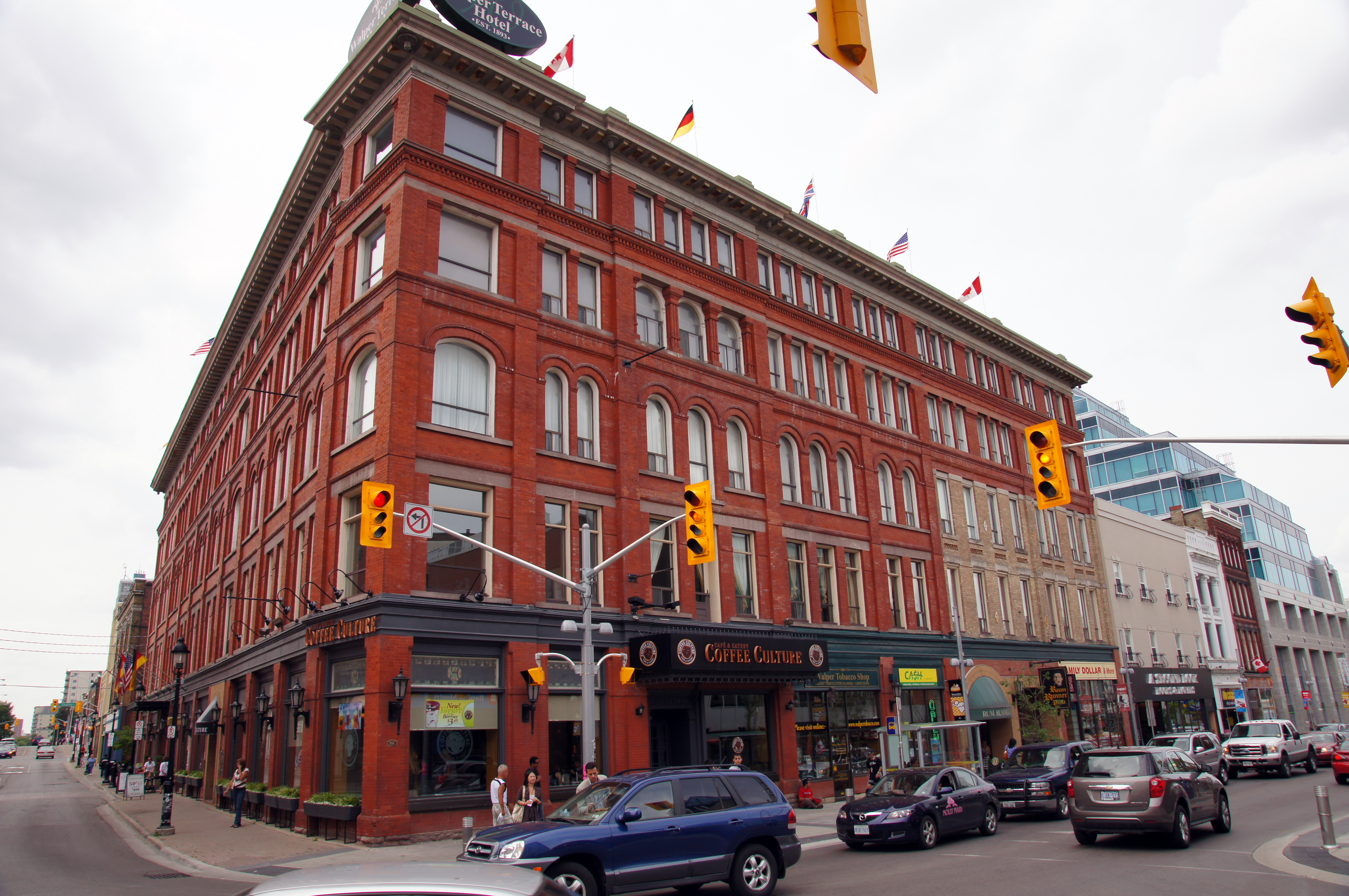
Walper Hotel (2011) in Kitchener, Ontario

A self-taught architect, Knechtel operated a practice in what was then Berlin, Ontario. He designed numerous buildings including the Berlin Opera House and St. Paul's Lutheran Church, in addition to overseeing renovations to the Courthouse and Gaol, Krug's Factory, and the Economical Block. Knechtel was also the architect responsible for Courtland Avenue Public School and King Edward Public School. One of his final projects was the Walper Hotel, which opened in 1893.

Knechtel died of typhoid fever December 14, 1894, and buried in Kitchener's Mount Hope Cemetery.
