= BNKC Architects =

Toronto-based design firm

BNKC Architects is a Toronto-based design firm founded in 1969. Originally known as Joseph Bogdan Associates and Bogdan Newman Caranci Architects, the firm's name change to BNKC was established in 2019.

BNKC specializes in architecture, urban design and master planning.

== Introduction ==
Founding Partner Joseph Bogdan started the firm in 1969. For 50 years, he directed a range of architectural and urban design projects including Old Hyde Park Village, in the historic centre of Tampa, Florida, and the College Park Redevelopment.

In 1969 Angelo Caranci joined the firm and led the office and industrial portfolio with projects including the Kennedy Commons Redevelopment, components of The Commons of Uptown Waterloo and CBC Headquarters.

Elie Newman joined the firm, then Joseph Bogdan Associates, in 1988 and became a partner in 2000. By 2010, the firm became Bogdan Newman Caranci Architects. By 2010, the firm became Bogdan Newman Caranci Architects. Newman is the architect and urban designer behind some of Canada's independent schools including The Bishop Strachan School and Royal St. George's College.

In 2019, Joseph Bogdan and Angelo Caranci retired from active practice leaving Newman and the firm's newly appointed partner Jonathan King as principals. A new visual identity and rebranding was revealed in 2019 including the firm's new logo and name change to BNKC.

Jonathan King is the architect behind the 8-storey tall wood commercial building 77 Wade Avenue located in Toronto's Junction neighbourhood, and East City Condos – an adaptive reuse project located within the St. Joseph's Community in Peterborough, Ontario. The development will convert a decommissioned hospital site and buildings into a new multi-family residential community. Developer, TVM Group, bought the land and the old hospital building from the city in 2009.

== Notable projects ==
- 5509 Dundas Street West
- 77 Wade Avenue
- Al Khor Master Plan, Qatar
- Beth Sholom Synagogue Additions & Renovations
- College Park Redevelopment
- East City Condos
- LiUNA Local 506 Training Centre
- International Ocean Shipping Building
- Royal St. George’s College Addition & Renovations
- Royal St. George’s College Chapel
- The Bishop Strachan School Transformation Project
- The Walper Hotel Renovation Project

== Awards and recognition ==
2020: Awarded Lieutenant Governor's Ontario Heritage Award for the restoration of The Walper Hotel in Kitchener, Ontario.
