= Woodside National Historic Site =

Historic home

Coordinates: 43.46360°N 80.48071°W

Woodside
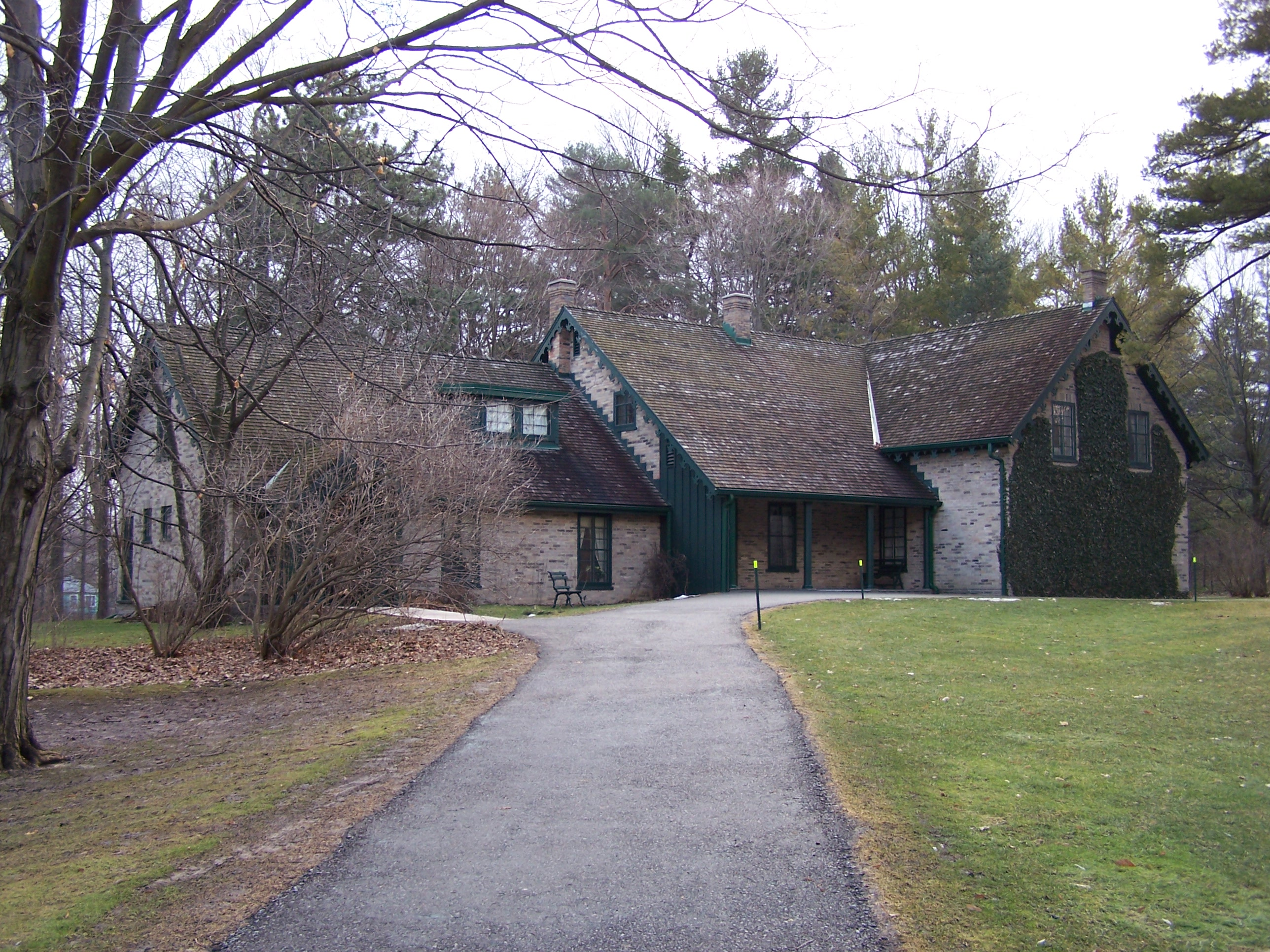
- Interactive map of Woodside
- Type: Childhood home of former Canadian Prime Minister William Lyon Mackenzie King.
- Location: 528 Wellington Street North; Kitchener, Ontario, Canada; N2H 5L5
- Built: 1853
- Architectural style: Victorian
- Governing body: Parks Canada
- Website: Woodside National Historic Site

National Historic Site of Canada
- Designated: 1952

Woodside National Historic Site is the childhood home of former Canadian Prime Minister William Lyon Mackenzie King. King resided there from 1886 to 1893. The house is located in the city of Kitchener, Ontario, Canada. The house was built in 1853. A group of local citizens created the Mackenzie King Woodside Trust to preserve the house from demolition and acquire the property. The house has been restored to reflect the Victorian era, and is managed and interpreted as a unit of the national park system. The 11.5-acre (47,000 m^{2}) site includes wooded grounds, gardens, and lawn. A video presentation is shown about the King family and Woodside. Victorian period programs and special events are offered, but the house is open fewer than 60 days a year, on select dates from October to mid-December. The grounds are open year-round.

The house and the grounds were designated a National Historic Site in 1952.

== See also ==
- List of historic places in Regional Municipality of Waterloo
- List of oldest buildings and structures in the Regional Municipality of Waterloo
