= Castle Kilbride =

Coordinates: 43°24′15″N 80°40′17″W

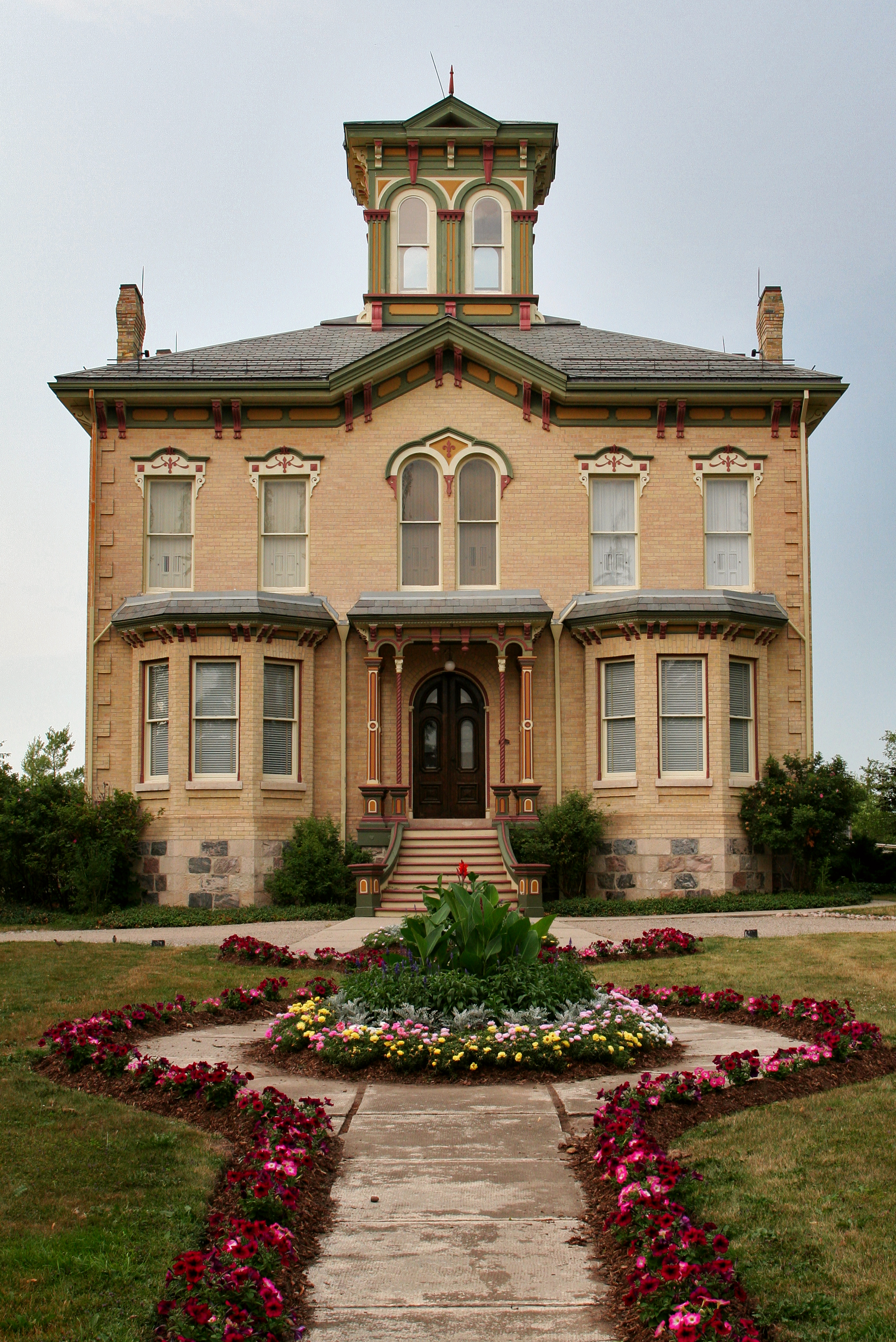
- Interactive map of Castle Kilbride
- Location: Baden, Regional Municipality of Waterloo, Ontario, Canada

History
- Built: 1877
- Original use: Residence of James Livingston

Site notes
- Elevation: 354 metres (1,161 ft)
- Website: www.castlekilbride.ca

National Historic Site of Canada
- Designated: March 1994

Castle Kilbride is the former residence of James Livingston, a Canadian member of parliament and owner of flax and linseed oil mills, and is located in Baden, Ontario, Canada. It was designated a National Historic Site of Canada in 1994.

It was built in 1877 and named after Livingston's birthplace East Kilbride in Scotland. The house has interior decorative murals in the style of the Italian Renaissance. The trompe-l'œil technique used in the murals gives the illusion of three dimensions. An Italianate villa, it was a tribute to the reputation of its owner as the so-called 'Flax and Oil King of Canada'.

== History ==
The original owner of Castle Kilbride was James Livingston, who was born in East Kilbride, Scotland. Livingston moved to Canada from Scotland around the age of 16. Arriving to Canada impoverished, he migrated to Baden, and began working with his older brother John in flax farming and linseed oil production. The Livingston brothers created the 'J&J Livingston Linseed Oil Company', and by 1881, they had more than 3000 acres that were being used for flax farming, and owned a highly profitable operation. In tribute to his success in business, Livingston built Castle Kilbride in 1877, which was also the year Livingston was elected Reeve of the Township of Wilmot.

Every year after Livingston's retirement there was a picnic held for all of the company employees along with their families. Upon the death of Livingston, their son, John Peter, his wife Laura, and their daughter Laura Louise moved into Castle Kilbride. The Livingston oil company began to decline at the invention of latex paint.

Castle Kilbride was sold to the Township of Wilmot in 1993.

== Building ==
The construction of Castle Kilbride took about one year to complete, finishing in 1878. It was constructed by a local man, David Gingerich. The home consisted of three main storeys and contained over 10,000 square feet of residential space. The only major addition occurred in 1920, when a summer kitchen was added.

Typical of its style, Castle Kilbride includes several fanciful features. The front lawn, for example, is heart-shaped, in tribute to Livingston’s wife Louise.

In 1988, the family sold the home’s belongings at auction before leaving it to sit empty for several years. In 1993, it was purchased by the Township of Wilmot, which undertook its restoration. In order to encourage preservation efforts, and in recognition of its interior decoration, Castle Kilbride was declared a National Historic Site in 1995.

Today, Castle Kilbride serves as an event venue and museum, displaying original furniture and household items as well as contemporary artifacts. In 2016 the grounds adjacent to the castle became home to the Prime Ministers Path, a series of bronze statues of Canadian prime ministers that invites visitors to explore the history of the country since Confederation. Castle Kilbride also plays host to guided ghost walks.

== See also ==
- List of historic places in Regional Municipality of Waterloo
- List of oldest buildings and structures in the Regional Municipality of Waterloo

== Bibliography ==
- Brown, Ron (2005). Top 100 Unusual Things to See in Ontario. Erin, ON: Boston Mills Press. pp. 196–197. ISBN 978-1-55046-475-7. OCLC 154683557.
