= Schneider Haus =

House in Kitchener, Canada

Schneider Haus National Historic Site
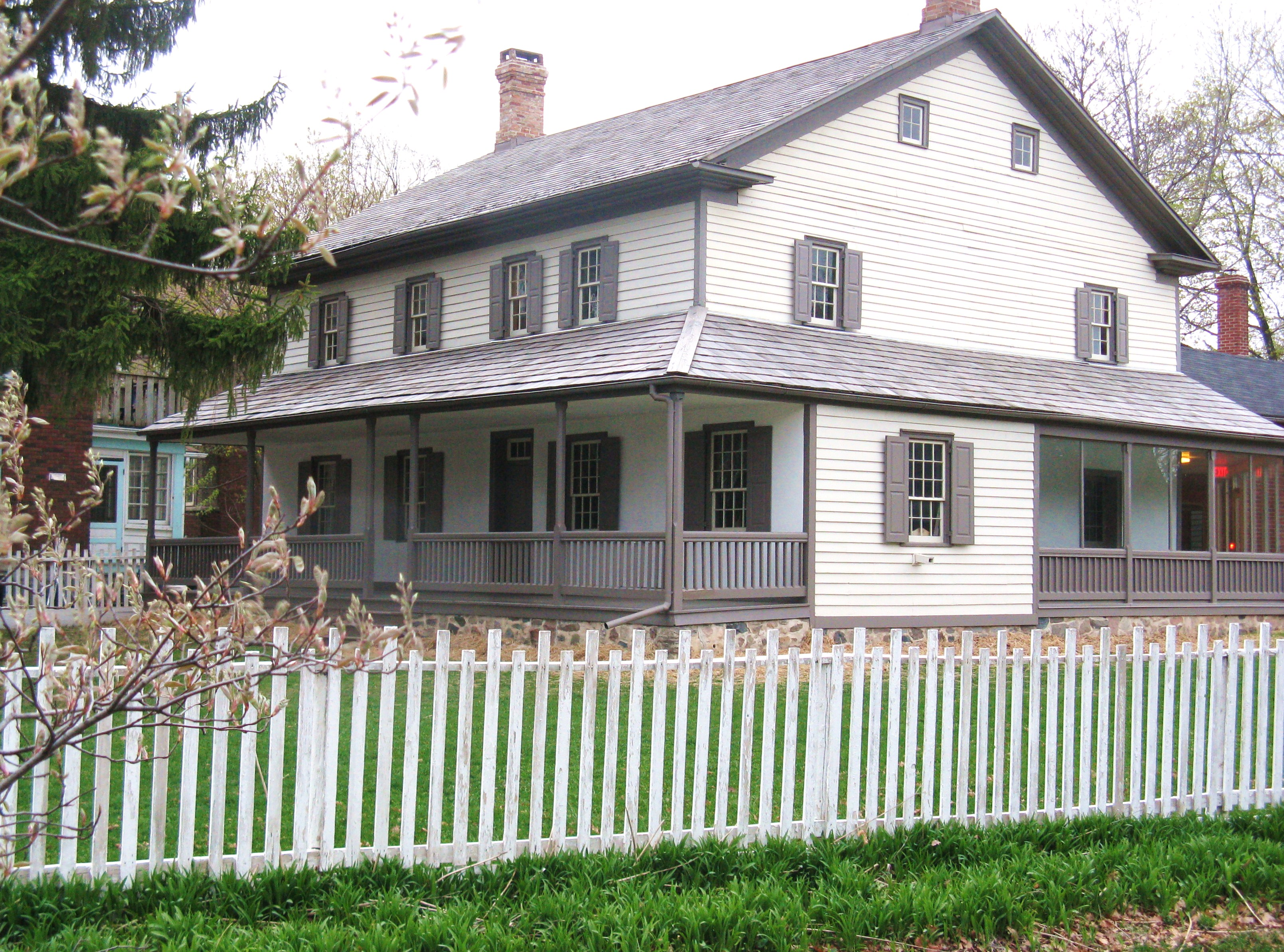

- Location within Regional Municipality of Waterloo Location within Southern Ontario
- Established: 1981
- Location: 466 Queen Street South; Kitchener, Ontario; N2G 1W7
- Coordinates: 43.4446°N 80.4946°W
- Public transit access: Short walk from Charles St. Terminal (Grand River Transit)
- Website: www.schneiderhaus.ca/en/index.aspx

National Historic Site of Canada
- Official name: Joseph Schneider Haus National Historic Site of Canada
- Designated: 1999

The Schneider Haus National Historic Site, formerly Joseph Schneider Haus, is a museum in Kitchener, Ontario, Canada. Situated on some of the earliest land to be settled by non-Indigenous peoples in what would become Waterloo County, the museum includes the oldest remaining dwelling in the area and was named a National Historic Site of Canada in 1999.

== History ==
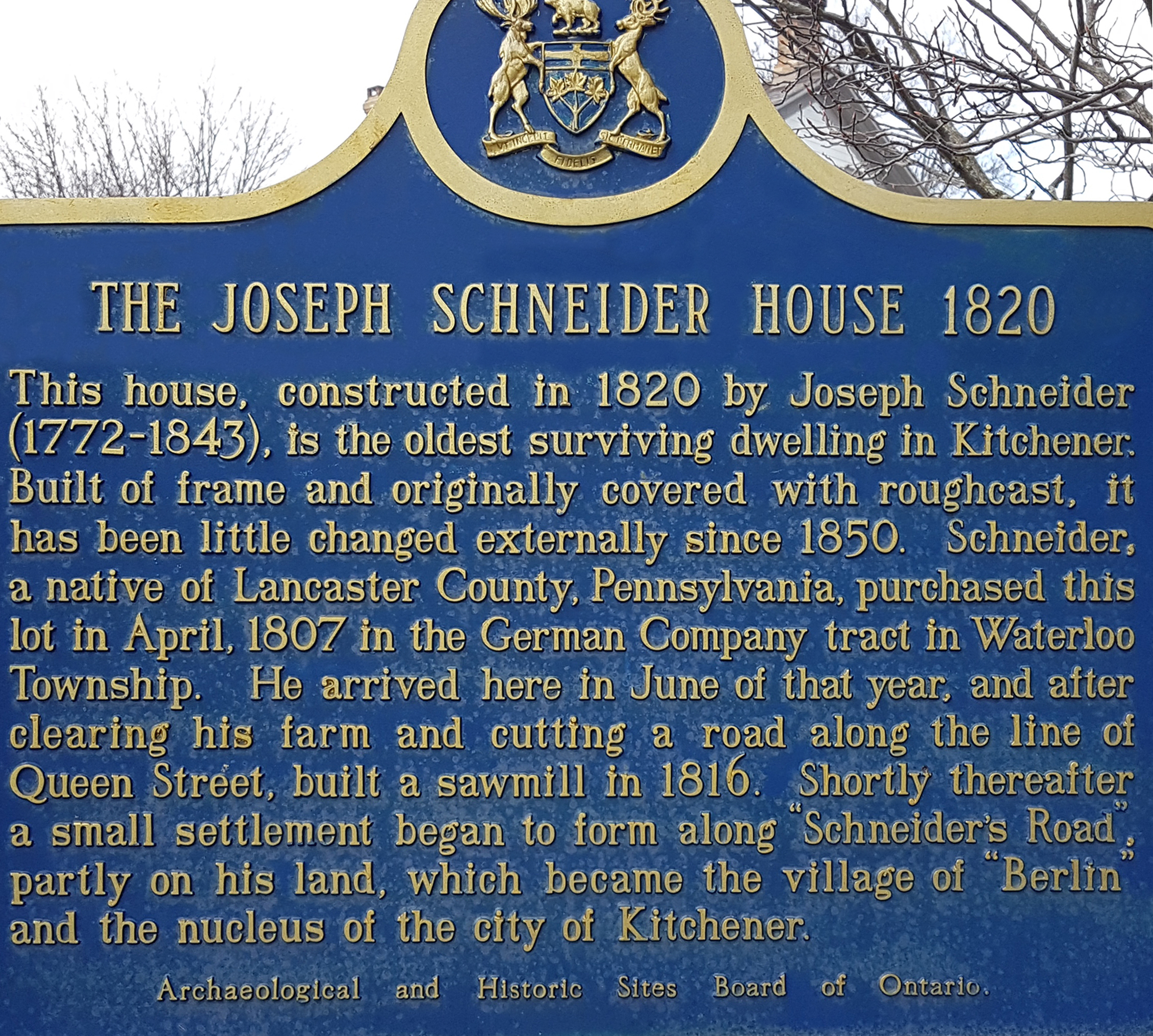

Schneider Haus was originally a farmstead with a Georgian-frame house, with outbuildings, built circa 1816 (not 1820 as a historic plaque indicates) by Joseph and Barbara Schneider in what was then called Berlin, Ontario. The family was among a large group of Pennsylvania German Mennonites from Lancaster County, Pennsylvania to settle in Waterloo County, Ontario in the early 19th century.

The land, situated on the German Company Tract, a subset of land within the Haldimand Tract known as Block 2, was the earliest in the County to be settled by non-Indigenous peoples. The group included Bishop Benjamin Eby, who planned to start a new Mennonite colony in what was then called Upper Canada. Eventually, the village of Ebytown (Berlin by the 1830s and Kitchener after 1916) grew around the core where the Haus is located. Other areas of what later became the Township of Waterloo and then Waterloo County, Ontario, including St. Jacobs, Ontario and Elmira, Ontario also attracted Mennonites.

Originally, the Schneider farmstead included 181-hectares. The house is the oldest extant dwelling in Kitchener. The Schneider Haus is a living re-creation of life in Ontario in the 1850s, and has been restored to that period. The site includes several out-buildings that help make the site reminiscent of an earlier era. Costumed interpreters use traditional implements to make history come to life. The museum's collection includes over 7,000 items such as paintings, quilts, historical documents, board games and leather objects.

The 1916 homestead was restored and opened as a museum in 1981. Costumed interpreters depict life in 1856; by that time, the second generation was living in the house. The Schneider Haus was designated a National Historic Site of Canada in 1999.

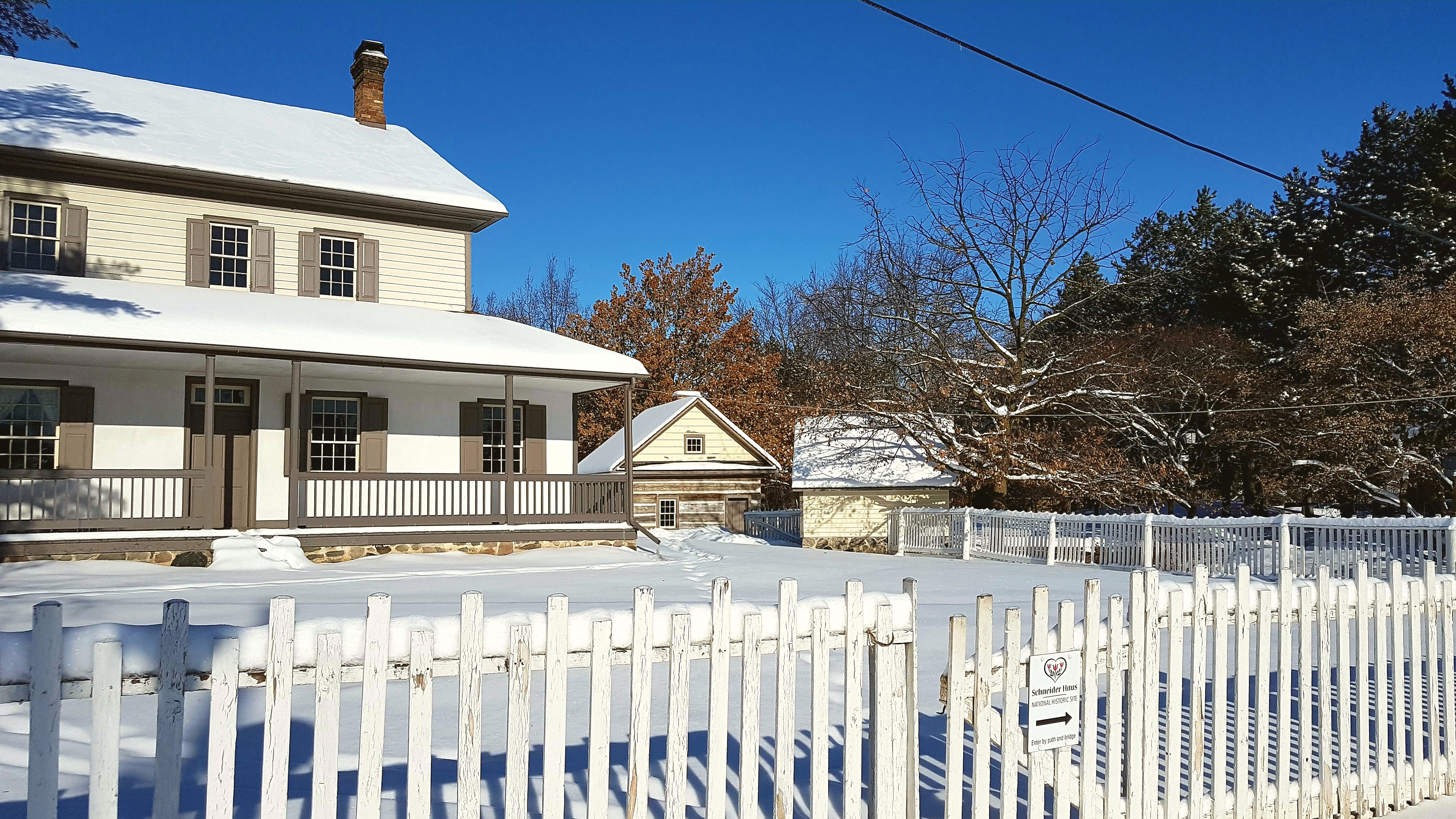
Schneider Haus, front view with outbuildings

=== Name change ===
In 2017, the Regional Municipality of Waterloo renamed the house, dropping the word Joseph from the name of the museum. The change was made better reflect the contributions of the Schneider family as a whole, including those of Joseph's wife Barbara, and to avoid confusion with the founder of the Schneider Foods, John Metz Schneider.

== See also ==
- List of oldest buildings and structures in the Regional Municipality of Waterloo
