= Laurel Heights Secondary School =

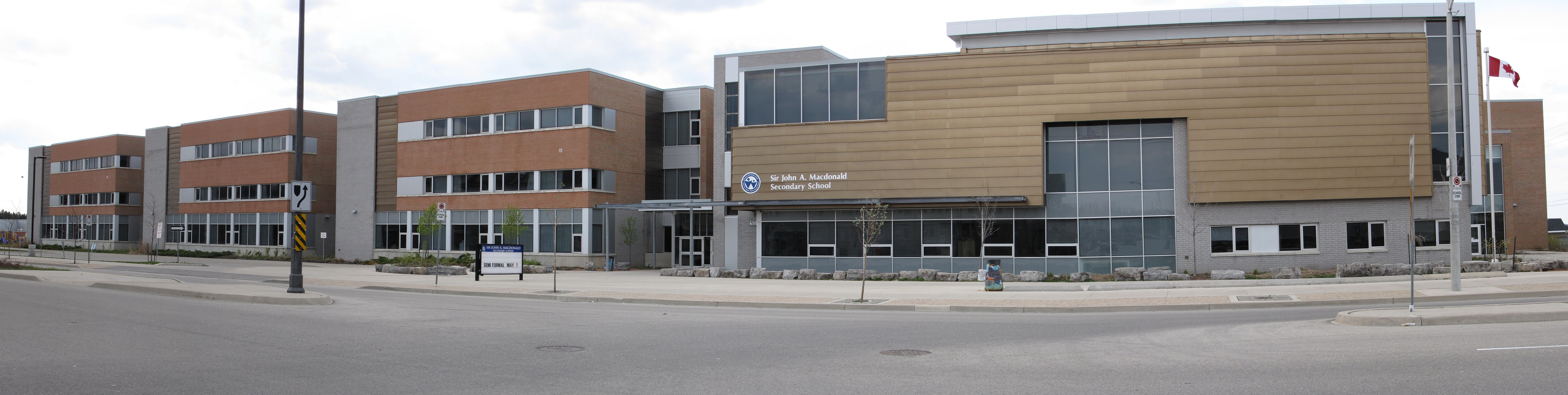
- Frontal Side of LHSS

Location
- 650 Laurelwood Drive; Waterloo, Ontario, N2V 2V1; Canada; 43.4711°N 80.5945°W

Information
- Former name: Sir John A. Macdonald Secondary School (SJAM)
- Motto: Audere est credere (Dare to believe)
- Religious affiliation: Interdenominational
- Established: 2004
- School board: Waterloo Region District School Board
- Principal: Bryan Lozon
- Grades: 9-12
- Enrollment: 1 756; Approx. 450 at each grade level
- Average class size: 25
- Language: English
- Colours: Light Blue, Dark Blue and White
- Mascot: Storm
- Team name: The Hurricanes (2022-present); Highlanders (2004-2022)
- Website: lhs.wrdsb.ca

Laurel Heights Secondary School (formerly Sir John A. Macdonald Secondary School) is a high school in Waterloo, Ontario, Canada, operated by the Waterloo Region District School Board (WRDSB). It opened in September 2004 and provides both academic and vocational programs. The school had 1,750 students as of the 2025–26 school year. Each year, around 450 new grade 9 students are enrolled from the following elementary schools: Centennial Public School, Edna Staebler Public School, Laurelwood Public School, St. Nicholas Catholic Elementary School and Vista Hills Public School. The school is located on 650 Laurelwood Drive in northwest Waterloo. It was originally named after Sir John A. Macdonald, the first prime minister of Canada; in 2022, it was renamed to Laurel Heights Secondary School (LHSS).

== History ==
Construction of the $27 million, 206,000-square-foot (19,100 m^{2}) school was plagued by construction delays. It opened two months before construction was complete, with students initially limited to partial days of classes. The name was selected in 2003 by school board trustees. When they asked for suggestions, the most frequently submitted name was Oscar Peterson, but because he was still alive, Peterson wasn't eligible to have a school named after him.

The school name garnered attention in 2018 because of civic awareness regarding the historical treatment of Indigenous peoples in the Canadian residential school system. In 2021, the school board determined that the name must be changed; in March 2022, the new name of Laurel Heights Secondary School was confirmed.

== Renaming Costs Controversy ==
In April 2026, Ishan Acharya, a Grade 10 student at the school filed an Freedom of Information request with the WRDSB to find out the costs of changing the school name from Sir John A. Macdonald Secondary School to Laurel Heights Secondary School.

The FOI revealed total renaming costs to have totalled up to $176,466.50, which prompted Ishan to reach out to local news organizations in order to publish the cost.

In May 2026, CTV Kitchener first reported on the cost, interviewing Ishan, and the story quickly reached national headlines, with CP24, National Post, Juno News, Fraser Institute, and Ontario Proud also reporting on it.

During the CTV Kitchener interview, Ishan questioned the financial priorities of the board, pointing to students who couldn't afford lunch at his school and the temporary closure of Elizabeth Ziegler Public School due to structural reasons. When questioned what the board should have done differently, Ishan said, "When you're making decisions for students, always consider how many students you are actually helping" and "[the cost] should have been open and transparent to the public". The story forced the WRDSB's Director of Education, Scott Miller, to release a statement in which he defended the board's actions, and said that the renaming happened after only "extensive engagement" with "students, parents, caregivers, staff, Indigenous communities, and the broader community".

Later, Ishan appeared as a guest on the Ben Mulroney Show where he explained the FOI in further detail and advocated for greater financial accountability from school boards.

== Clubs and Activities ==
The drama department participates in the annual SEARS festivals. In the 2012–13 school year, they advanced to regionals. In 2014, they hosted the festival for Waterloo schools, and in 2018 they hosted NTSDF.

In 2026, LHSS hosted the Kiwanis Music Festival, where they won a multitude of Gold Rankings with their String Ensemble, Junior Concert Band, Junior Jazz Band, Senior Concert Band, Senior Jazz Band, and the LHSS Jazz Combo "7/11".

LHSS offers numerous clubs, teams, and activities. As of 2026, there are over 70 clubs at the school, varying from athletic programs such as the LHSS Dance Team to academic programs such as the Computer Science Club.

== Academic Rankings ==
In 2019, the Fraser Institute ranked LHSS as one of the best schools in Ontario with an average performance score of 8.1 out of 10. This ranking has improved to 8.7 out of 10 as of November 2026. LHSS ranks better than 90 per cent of schools in the Waterloo Region and 85 per cent of schools in all of Ontario. As of 2026, LHSS ranks as the highest secondary school in the Waterloo Region.

In the 2024-2025 school year, 83% of Grade 9 students met the provincial standard in math. This was the highest in Waterloo, outranking BCI at 75%, St. David at 67%, and WCI at 57%.. LHSS also outranked the highest Kitchener secondary school, Cameron Heights, which had 74% of their Grade 9 students meet the provincial standard in math, and also outranked the highest Cambridge secondary school, ÉSC Père-René-de-Galinée, which had 70%. This means that Laurel Heights ranked highest in the entire Waterloo Region.

== Notable Alumni ==
- Steven Lorentz, NHL hockey player and Stanley Cup winner
- Amanda Woodcroft, indoor and field hockey player

== See also ==
- Education in Ontario
- List of secondary schools in Ontario
