= Cameron Heights =

Cameron Heights may refer to:

- Cameron Heights Collegiate Institute, a school in Kitchener, Ontario, Canada
- Cameron Heights, Edmonton, a neighbourhood in west Edmonton, Alberta, Canada
