= Raffin =

Raffin may refer to:

- Librairie Raffin, a Canadian bookstore chain
- Raffin, Sutherland, a community in Assynt, Sutherland, Highland, Scotland

People with the surname

- Deborah Raffin (1953-2012), American actress
- Luigi Raffin (1936–2023), Italian footballer
- Romel Raffin (born 1954), Canadian basketball player
- Angelo Raffin (born 1946), Canadian football player
