= CHCI =

CHCI may be:

- Cameron Heights Collegiate Institute
- Cameron Heights, Edmonton
- Chimpanzee and Human Communication Institute
- Congressional Hispanic Caucus Institute
