= FHCI =

The acronym FHCI can refer to two different Canadian highschools:

- Forest Hill Collegiate Institute
- Forest Heights Collegiate Institute
