= Bluevale Collegiate Institute =

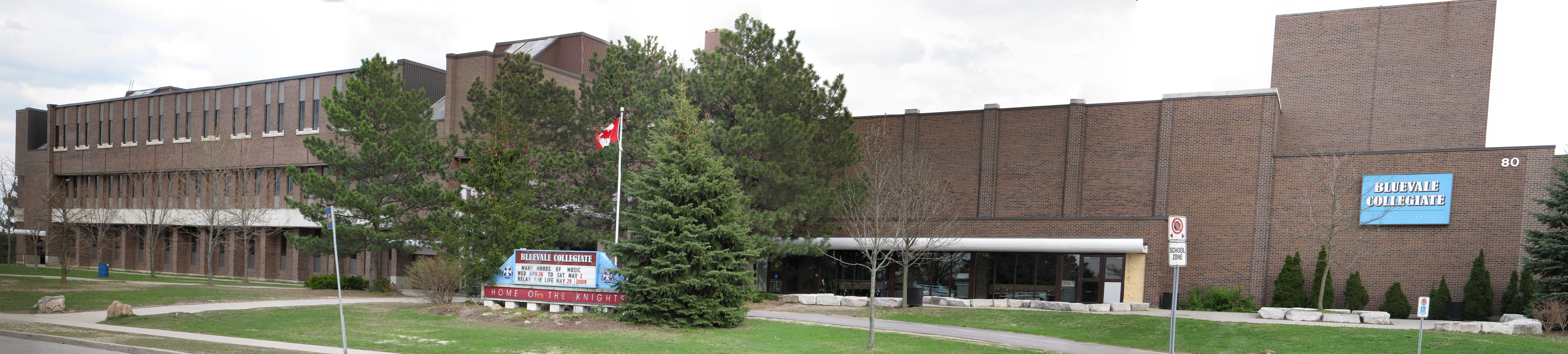
- Bluevale Collegiate Institute, seen in 2009

Location
- 80 Bluevale Street North; Waterloo, Ontario, N2J 3R5; Canada; 43.4751°N 80.5000°W

Information
- School type: High school
- Motto: Non Quis Sed Quid (It's not who you are, but what you are.)
- Founded: 1972
- School board: Waterloo Region District School Board
- Principal: Pauline Janke
- Grades: 9-12
- Enrollment: 1,240 (2019–2020)
- Colours: Maroon, Light Blue and White
- Mascot: Norm, the Knight
- Team name: The Knights
- Website: bci.wrdsb.ca

Bluevale Collegiate Institute is a secondary school in Waterloo, Ontario, Canada, run by the Waterloo Region District School Board. As of the 2019–2020 school year, Bluevale has an enrollment of 1,240 students. The school opened in 1972 under the direction of principal Robert Chilton, and vice-principal Charlie Wilson, initially with grades 9 through 11, adding grades 12, and then 13 in subsequent years. Bluevale's new school boundary took in students previously registered at Cameron Heights Collegiate Institute, Kitchener–Waterloo Collegiate, and Waterloo Collegiate Institute. As of 2026, the principal is Mrs P Janke.

== Motto and colours ==
The school colours are maroon, powder blue and white. The school's motto is "Non Quis Sed Quid", meaning "it’s not who you are, but what you are". Bluevale's mascot is a knight, named Norm.

== Academic programs ==
According to the 2022–2023 course offerings, Bluevale Collegiate Institute offers courses in the following subjects: arts (including music, drama, and visual arts), business studies, Canadian and world studies, English, French, health and physical education, mathematics, native studies, science, social sciences, and technological education.

Programs specific to the school include: Choose to Lead, which includes obtainment of the Duke of Edinburgh award; SHSM, or Specialist High Skills Major – which provides students with specialized skills and certifications – which is offered in the subjects technology, arts, or sports; and KRT, or the Knights of the Round Table, which serves as the school's student council and offers specific leadership courses to students. Bluevale also offers AP (Advanced Placement) courses, with Pre-AP courses offered in grades 9-11 and AP courses offered in grade 12.

== Extracurricular programs ==
=== Sports ===
Bluevale provides opportunities for participation in athletics including intramurals, team sports and individual-based programs. These opportunities include rugby, Canadian football, basketball, volleyball, swimming, tennis, track and field, cross-country, curling, skiing, ice hockey, badminton, and other teams. The school participates in WCSSAA (Waterloo County Secondary School Athletic Association).

Many BCI teams have won WCSSAA and CWOSSA (Central Western Ontario Secondary School Association) titles and have performed well at the Provincial level. The Senior Boys and Girls Rugby teams both won WCSSA championships in 2013. The Senior Girls rugby team then placed in the top ten in all-Ontario competition. The BCI girls' field hockey team won two consecutive OFSAA (Ontario Federation of School Athletic Associations) championships in 2016 and 2017, while also medalling in the 2014 and 2015 campaigns.

=== Arts programs ===
The school's arts program offers music, dance, and visual arts. In addition, there are two different choirs, two bands, and some small ensembles. The main choir, Bluevale Singers, had over 100 members in 2013. The music program features instrumental, vocal and guitar courses. In 2003, Bluevale hosted the first annual provincial DanceFest, an annual dance competition and showcase of dance teams from schools across Ontario. 125 secondary students attended. In 2015, Ontario Secondary School DanceFest became a nonprofit organization. Drama students perform at the National Theatre School Drama Festival (formerly the Sears Drama Festival) competitions each year and in their annual Fall Showcase. The visual arts program provides many opportunities for students to challenge their creativity though works of art using many mediums.

=== Other clubs ===
Like other schools in the region, Bluevale consistently has a high extracurricular participation rate, due to Students Council (also known as KRT - Knights of the Round Table) and the large number of clubs at the school. Other clubs include DECA (Distributive Education Clubs of America), the Fishing Club and the Environment Club. The school often partners with other high schools in the region for special events such as Relay for Life, an event that raises money for cancer research.

== Notable alumni ==
- Todd Brooker - An Olympic skier, who was a member of Canada's national ski team from 1976-1987. He won three Alpine skiing World Cup titles.
- Scott Moir and Tessa Virtue - 2 time Olympic Champions. They attended 2003-2004 while training at the KW skating club.
- Steven Rice - National Hockey League
- C. Ernst Harth - Character actor known for such films as Smokin' Aces 2: Assassins' Ball, Scooby-Doo 2: Monsters Unleashed and Thir13en Ghosts
- Andrew Poje - 3-time Canadian national champion, 3-time world medalist in ice dancing
- Guillermo Verdecchia - Playwright has won the Governor General's Award for English language drama and a Floyd S. Chalmers Canadian Play Award.
- Chris Williams (director) - Oscar winning movie director
- Mike West - As a member of the Canadian Swim Team, he won a Bronze Olympic medal in 1984
- Kirsten Moore-Towers - 2014 Olympic Silver medal team skating

== See also ==
- Education in Ontario
- List of secondary schools in Ontario
- List of Waterloo Region, Ontario schools
