= Meena Waseem =

Pakistani-Canadian advocate for equitable education

Meena Waseem is a Pakistani-Canadian and Muslim advocate for accessible education from Kitchener, Ontario. In February 2019, she was named one of thirty-five Loran Scholars nationwide. In April 2019, she was named Kitchener-Waterloo Woman of the Year in the Young Adult category, making her the youngest recipient of the award.

== Education ==
Waseem attended Cameron Heights Collegiate Institute in Kitchener, Ontario where she was student council president. She is a Bachelor of Commerce student at Queen's University.

== Advocacy and influence ==
Waseem is known for co-organizing Stolen By Smith, a campaign calling for improved diversity, equity, and inclusion at Queen's and the Smith School of Business at Queen's. She has criticized business schools for lacking inclusive policies and curriculums that teach equity-centred leadership. She is also outspoken about the minimization of equity-deserving students' experiences in business schools. Stolen By Smith led to the creation of similar calls to action at business schools across Canada.

In March 2022, Waseem also organized Ramadan dining hall supports for Muslim students observing Ramadan at Queen's.

In response to employers' concerns about the Great Resignation, Waseem was outspoken about the importance of workplace flexibility for Gen Z employees.

Waseem was part of a team that created Waterloo Region's first youth wellbeing data collection project.

She is a Young Director in Cohort 5 of the FORA: Network for Change Girls on Boards program.

Waseem serves on the Board of Directors of the Sexual Assault Centre of Kingston.
