= Eastwood Collegiate Institute =

Public high school in Kitchener, Ontario

Location
- 760 Weber Street East; Kitchener, Ontario, N2H 1H6; Canada; 43°26′22.61″N 80°27′30.76″W

Information
- School type: High School
- Motto: Ex Oriente Lux (From the East Comes Light)
- Founded: 1956
- School board: Waterloo Region District School Board
- School number: 907499
- Principal: Jeff Klinck
- Staff: 133
- Grades: 9-12
- Enrollment: 1,290 (February 2026)
- Language: English
- Area: Kingsdale, Rockway, Chicopee
- Colours: Red, Grey and White
- Team name: Lions
- Website: eci.wrdsb.ca

Eastwood Collegiate Institute is a public high school in Kitchener, Ontario, Canada. It was established in 1956. The school teams are known as the "Lions". Eastwood is known for its Provincially ranked soccer teams, as well as its Integrated Arts Program. Its motto is Ex Oriente Lux.

== History ==
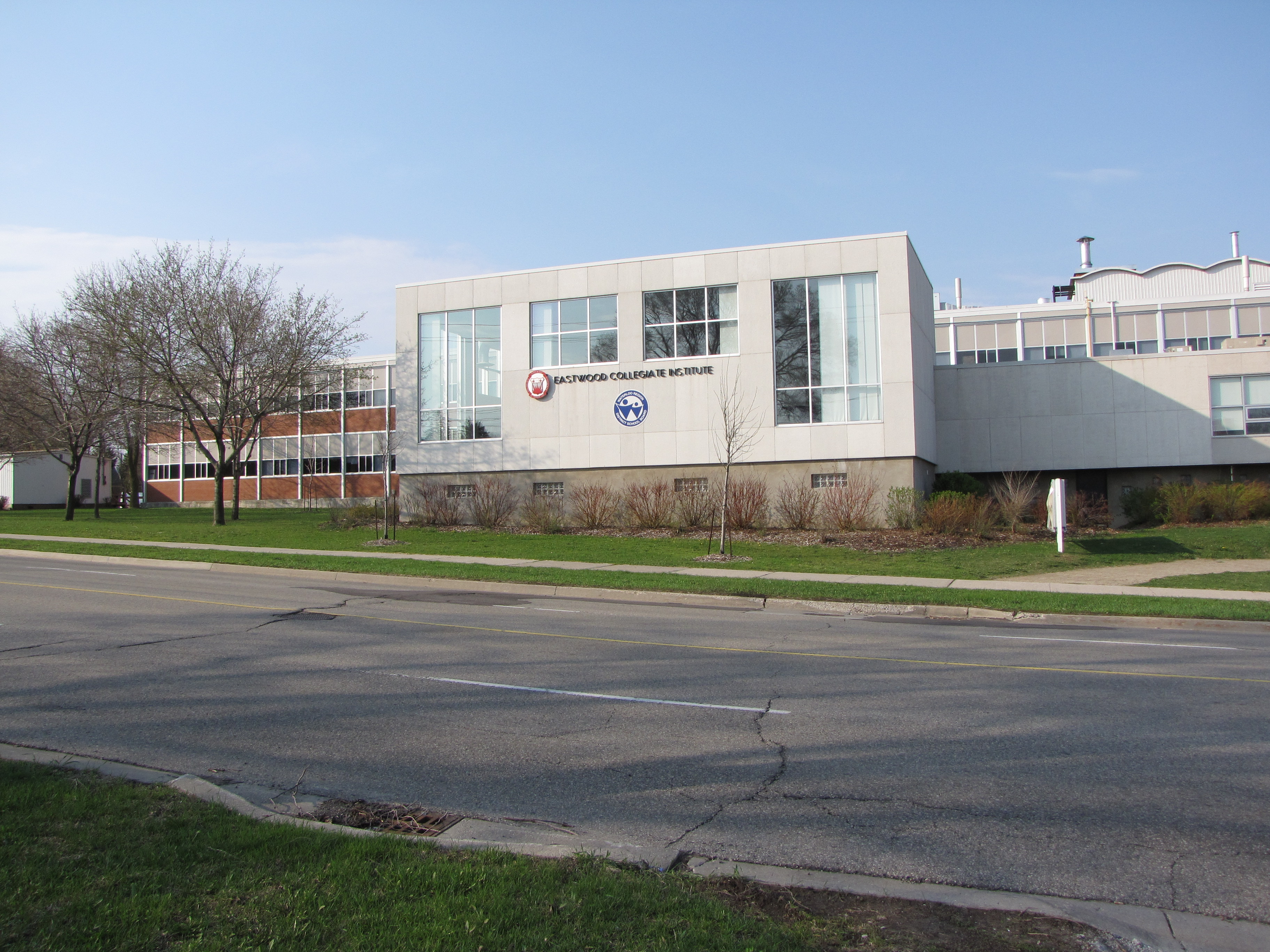
Exterior view

The school was built in 1956, located on what was then the recently extended East Avenue (now Weber Street). The architect for the building was the company of Barnett & Rieder. Most of the school consists of a long classroom block that runs parallel to Weber Street. There is a large entrance stair at the south side of the classroom block, with the school offices to the north and the gymnasium, whose walls are of ribbed brick, to the south. The architecture of the school received international attention when it opened. The school's crest was designed by former Eastwood student Doug Rickert in 1957.

A new library, dance studio, front steps, elevator, a re-vitalized woodworking shop, a costume room, and a new sprinkler system were completed in 2005 to bring the school up to fire code. The school received a visit from former Canadian Prime Minister Paul Martin in 2006.

Beginning March 2007, a massive renovation began at the school, which includes new windows for the whole building, new ventilation system, new boiler system, and hiding the sprinkler pipes installed 2 years prior. Air conditioning is being installed, but will not be available to the whole school, only certain special parts will have it (such as computer labs) but the average classroom will not.

In 2020 a new, large and modern weight-room was added, along with an innovative and flexible multi-purpose Technology Studies Room and a new general Multi-purpose Room. In response to a new Green Industries program, a chicken run and raised vegetables beds were built. In 2021, Science and Family Studies Rooms were updated and plans were made to renovate the washrooms and add additional gender neutral washrooms. Due to COVID-19, this work has been rescheduled for summer 2022.

=== Mascot ===
The Rebel Lion

The school's original mascot, Johnny Rebel, was chosen to represent Eastwood's original rebellious spirit (many of the original teachers had left KCI to come to Eastwood). In 1998, it was decided that Johnny Rebel no longer personified what it meant to be a Rebel because of the attached history and racism of the Confederate army's fight to maintain slavery. At that point, the Confederate flag was a prominent feature of his costume, and a version of the flag could be seen on the previous cafeteria mural, with Canadian Maple-Leaves replacing the stars). A contest was held among the students and staff to design a new mascot. Eventually, it was decided that two lions (one male and one female, wearing a football jersey and a basketball jersey respectively, would be used.

In 2005, a contest was held for another overhaul of the mascot, with students and staff again submitting designs. Ultimately, a design by former Eastwood art teacher David Okum was selected. The "Rebel Lion", a lion in an updated soldier's uniform.

In 2020, the school announced that they were seeking alternatives to the name Rebel. The mascot was changed to simply "The Lions" in 2021. The logo features a mountain lion and flames. A student designed the new Eastwood Lions logo in 2021.

== Programming ==
Eastwood has a specialized arts program, known as the Integrated Arts Program, which offers courses in drama, dance, music, and visual arts. The school also has programs in lighting, sound, stage managing, stage and set design, costume design and creation.

== Notable alumni ==
- AJ Bridel – actress and singer
- Charity Brown – recording artist
- David Barr Chilton – author, investor, and television personality
- Kevin Crockett – Olympic speed skater
- Gary Dornhoefer – NHL player
- James Fleming – politician
- Lyle Green – CFL player
- Mary Hofstetter – arts administrator and educator
- Markus Koch – NFL defensive lineman
- Gabriel Landeskog – NHL player
- Sandra L. Murray – psychologist and author
- Alex Mustakas – actor and theatre director
- Angelo Raffin – Canadian football player
- Romel Raffin - Olympic basketball player
- Karen Redman – politician
- Mike Richards – NHL player
- Jeff Skinner – NHL player
- Mike Stevens – NHL player
- Scott Stevens – NHL player named one of the "100 Greatest NHL Players"
- Fitzroy Vanderpool – boxing champion

== See also ==
- Education in Ontario
- List of secondary schools in Ontario
