= Southwood Secondary School =

High school in Ontario, Canada

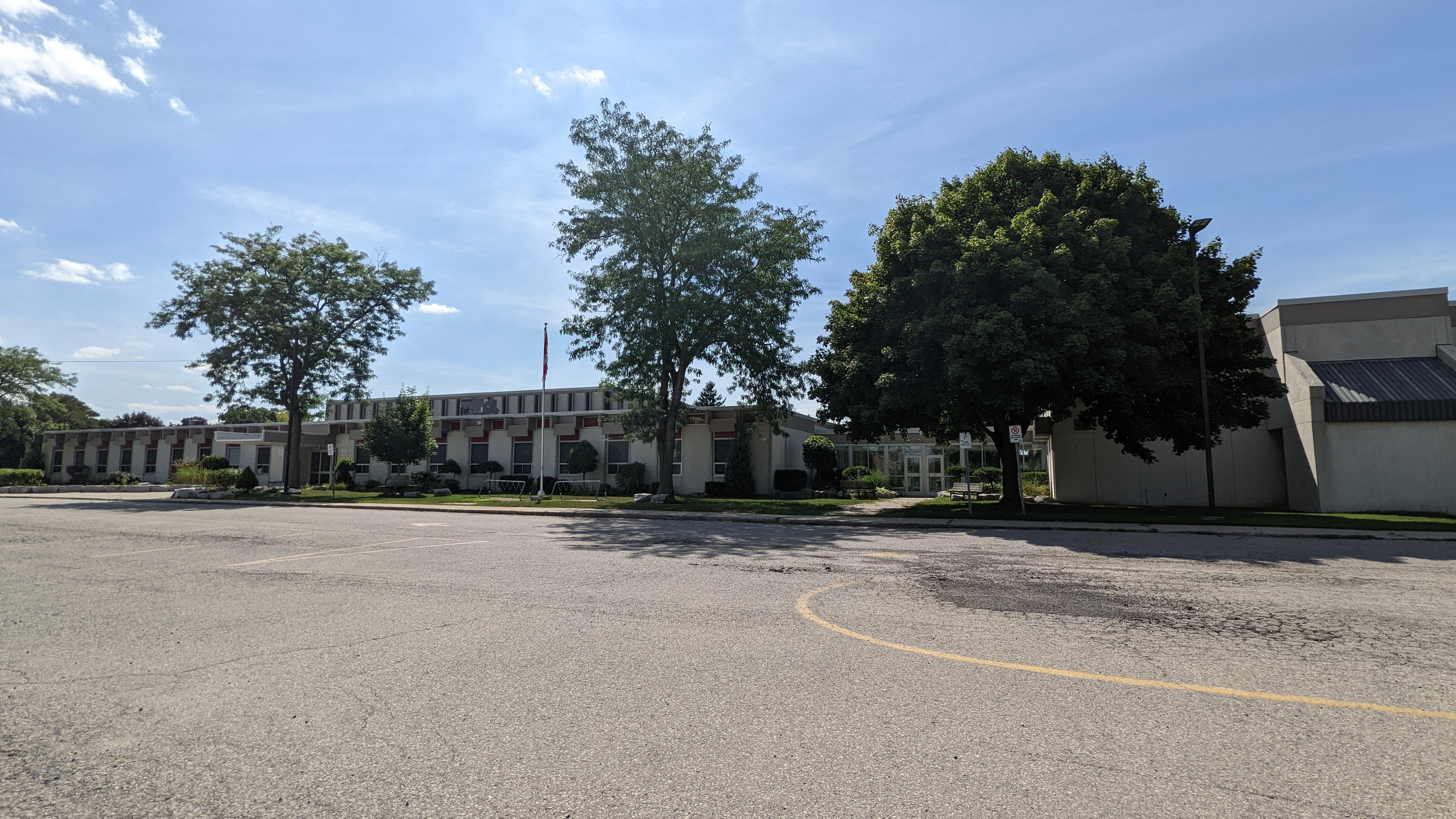

Location
- 30 Southwood Drive; Cambridge, Ontario, N1S 4K3; Canada; 43.34904°N 80.33705°W

Information
- School type: High School
- Motto: Nihil Sine Labore (Nothing Without Work)
- Founded: 1962
- School board: Waterloo Region District School Board
- Superintendent: Vida Collis
- Principal: Carli Parsons
- Grades: 9-12
- Enrollment: 795 (Sep 2019)
- Language: English
- Area: West Galt and Ayr
- Colours: Red, Green and White
- Mascot: Sabre
- Team name: Southwood Sabres
- Feeder schools: Cedar Creek P.S. St. Andrew's P.S.
- Public transit access: 55 - St. Andrews; 62 - Woodside
- Website: https://sss.wrdsb.ca/

Southwood Secondary School is a high school in Cambridge, Ontario, Canada, for students in West Galt and North Dumfries.

== History ==
Southwood was founded in 1962. It has one of the lower student enrollments in the region. Its success rates in the literacy test are 6% above the board average and 8% above the provincial average. A 2003 report from the Region of Waterloo to the school board said of the school:

Southwood Secondary School’s culture is unique due to its student population being made up of students residing in an urban environment and a significant number of students from a rural environment. It is the only secondary school located in the west side of Galt-Cambridge to serve that community as well as the adjacent Township of North Dumfries.

It became the subject of controversy in 2003 when it was perceived that this was an undersized school and should be closed, as funding was needed to build the Huron Heights Secondary School elsewhere in the Region. After lengthy protests, differing proposals, and the November 2003 municipal election, the trustees voted to reverse the decision of the previous board and keep Southwood open.

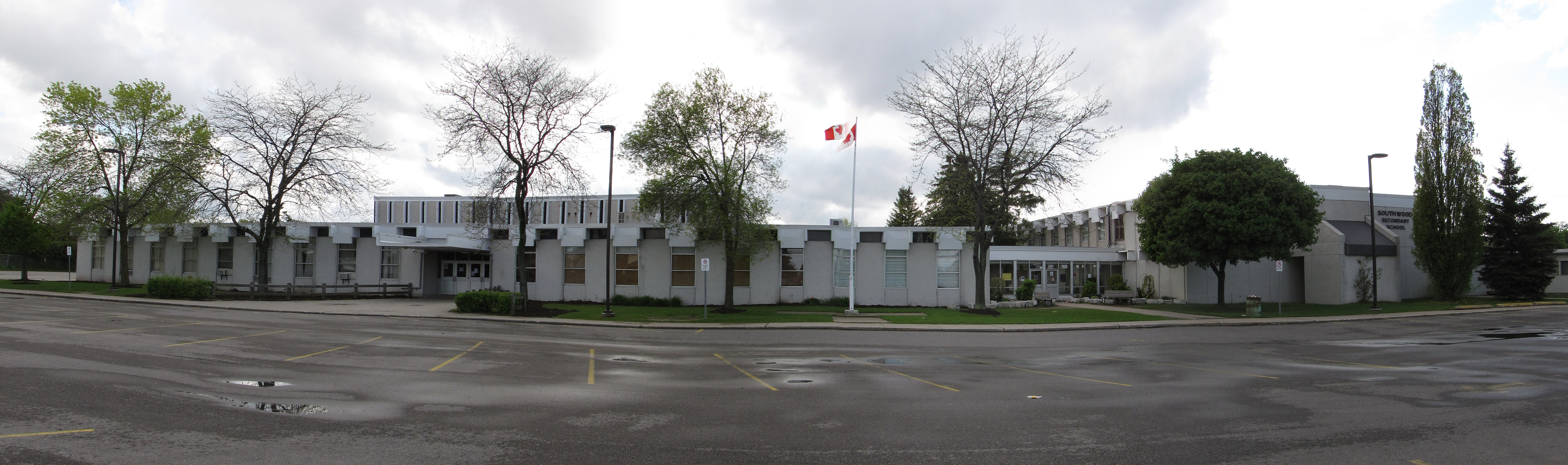

== Programs ==
Southwood has music, drama and mathematics programs. Prior to the 2005/2006 school year, Southwood also hosted the area's French Immersion program, which has since moved to GCI. As of the 2006-2007 school year, Southwood has hosted the region's PAL program.

Southwood has won several championships at the WCSSAA and CWOSSA levels in the last few years, notably in Volleyball, Basketball, Swimming and Cross Country. These teams have also participated at OFSAA. In 2007, the Sr. Boys Basketball Team won the AAA OFSAA championship. In 2013 and 2014 the Southwood Football team won a senior "B" division championship despite being a varsity team.

In 2007, a group of students from Southwood were among a group of over 3,500 students from across Canada who travelled to Vimy Ridge to commemorate the 90th anniversary of the battle and restoration of the memorial.

In 2019, a group of students from Southwood's Drama Club performed Sometimes I Look Up to the Sky, their official National Theatre School Drama Festival submission for the year, at district, regional and provincial levels. They received awards, including:

Award	Distinction
Awards of Merit	Videography, Sound Design, New Play
Awards of Excellence	Collective Ensemble Creation, Bravery and Risk
MIRA Award	Sound Design

The school was quoted by local author Joel Rubinoff in The Record: "To emphasize the significance of this year's ranking, out of 360 performances across Ontario, the NTS provincial showcase features the 12 best. Southwood is the only school in Waterloo Region to make it this far."

== Notable alumni ==
- Yvonne Tousek — Gymnastics (1996 Olympic Games)
- Jody Hull — retired NHL player
- Bryan Little — NHL Player (Winnipeg Jets)
- 347aidan - Rapper
- Kyle Clifford — NHL Champion (L.A. Kings)
- Vincent Marcone — Juno award-winning artist & graphic designer
- J. R. Fitzpatrick — NASCAR Camping World Truck Series & Nationwide driver, CASCAR champion
- Doug Consiglio — former Canadian Olympian and World Record holder

== See also ==
- Education in Ontario
- List of secondary schools in Ontario
