= Huron Heights Secondary School =

Huron Heights Secondary School may refer to:

- Huron Heights Secondary School (Kitchener)
- Huron Heights Secondary School (Newmarket)
