= Waypoint Kangaroo =

2016 novel by Curtis C. Chen

First edition, Cover artist: David Curtis

Waypoint Kangaroo is a 2016 science fiction novel by Curtis C. Chen. It is Chen's debut novel, and was first published by Thomas Dunne Books.

== Synopsis ==
When inept agent Evan Rogers — codenamed "Kangaroo" for his unique ability to open portals into a pocket universe — bungles a mission, his supervisors send him on an interplanetary cruise to keep him away from auditors. The cruise is soon disrupted, however — first by a double murder, and then by the revelation of a terror plot.

== Reception ==
Publishers Weekly called it as "a rollicking splice of mystery and high-tech SF", noting its "powerful climax" and deeming it an "auspicious start" for Chen's career. Kirkus Reviews considered Kangaroo to be "engaging" and his world "rich (and) believable", with a "pace (that) never flags" and a "plot (that) never stops twisting and turning".

At Black Gate, Brandon Crilley lauded the quality of Chen's exposition and narrative voice, and compared the novel to both The Poseidon Adventure and Guardians of the Galaxy. James Nicoll, however, faulted the novel for underuse of Kangaroo's superpower, saying that he "kept thinking of much more interesting things he could do with his power than the things he actually does", and observed that the story was built on "a collection of time honoured stock props".

Waypoint Kangaroo was a finalist for the 2017 Locus Award for Best First Novel.
