= Ronnie Pfeffer =

Canadian football player

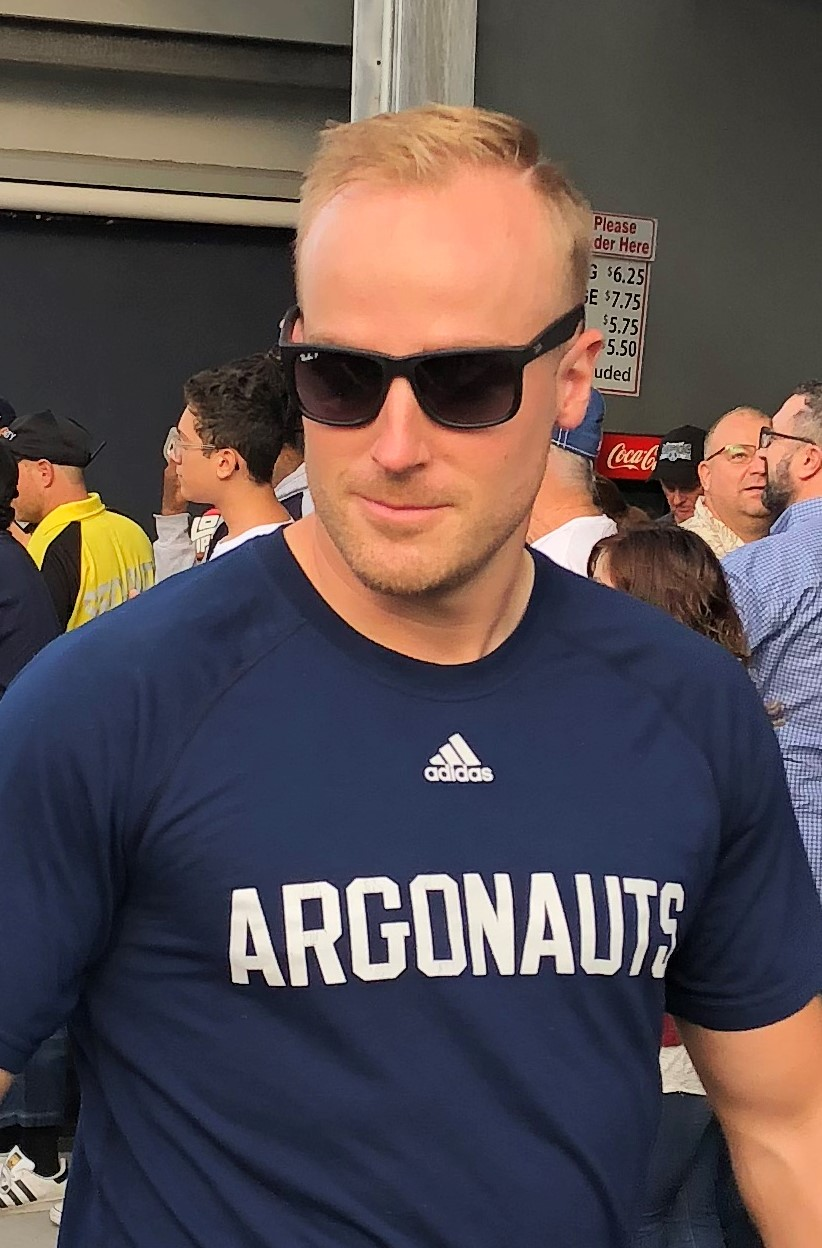
- Pfeffer with the Toronto Argonauts in 2018

No. 17
- Positions: Kicker, punter

Personal information
- Born: June 17, 1992 (age 34); Kitchener, Ontario, Canada
- Listed height: 5 ft 11 in (1.80 m)
- Listed weight: 185 lb (84 kg)

Career information
- High school: Cameron Heights Collegiate
- University: Wilfrid Laurier
- CFL draft: 2014: undrafted

Career history
- 2015: Toronto Argonauts
- 2015–2016: Ottawa Redblacks
- 2017–2019: Toronto Argonauts
- 2020–2021: Calgary Stampeders

Awards and highlights
- 2× Grey Cup champion (2016, 2017)
- Stats at CFL.ca

Ronald Pfeffer (born June 17, 1992) is a Canadian former professional football placekicker and punter who played in the Canadian Football League (CFL). He was originally signed as an undrafted free agent on July 1, 2015 by the Toronto Argonauts. He was a member of both the 104th Grey Cup champion Ottawa Redblacks and the 105th Grey Cup champion Argonauts. He played CIS football for the Wilfrid Laurier Golden Hawks.

== Professional career ==
Pfeffer re-signed with the Calgary Stampeders on February 10, 2021. He became a free agent after the 2021 season.
