= Suddaby Public School =

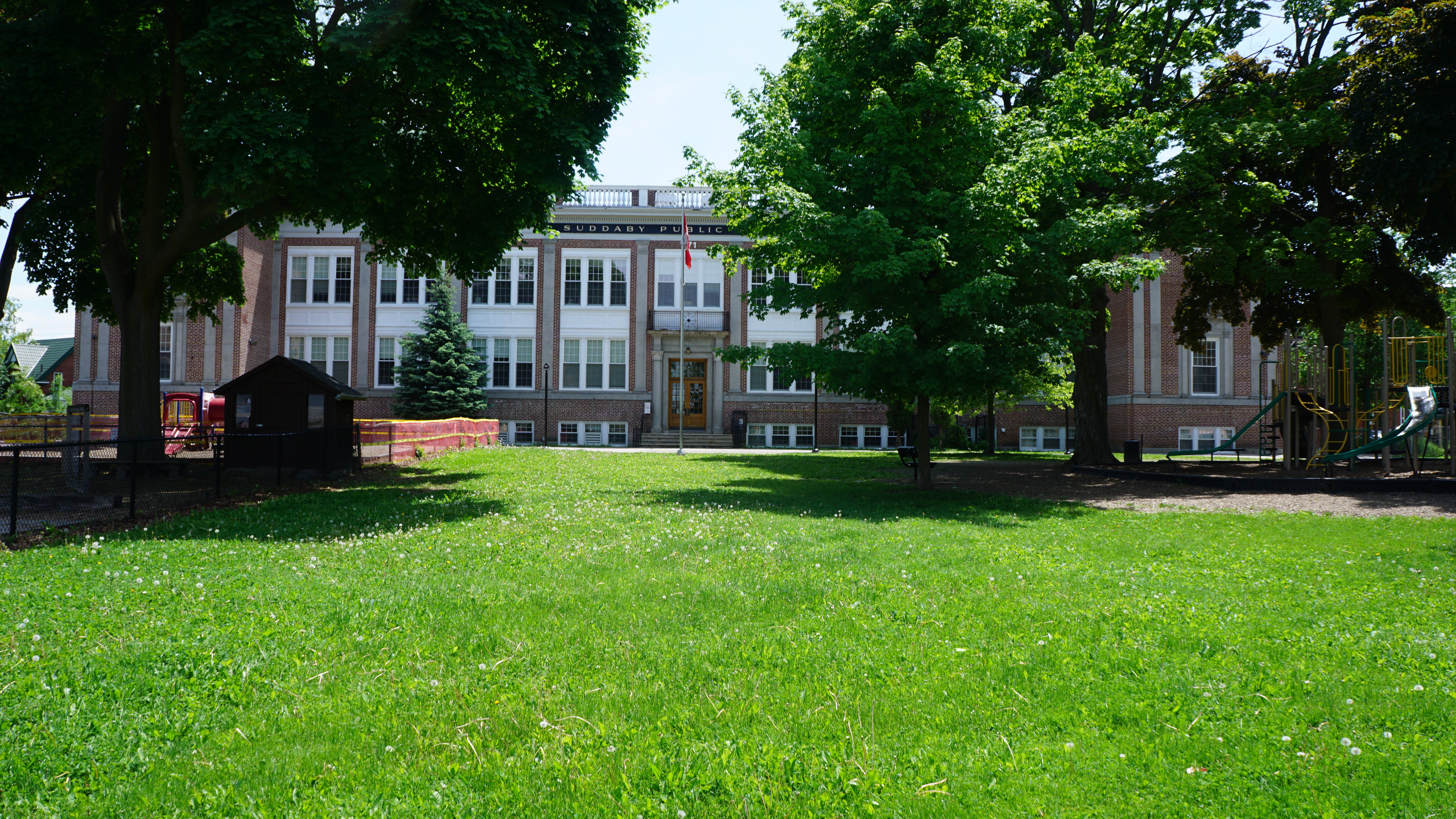

Location
- 171 Frederick Street; Kitchener, Ontario, N2H 2M6; Canada; 43.452222°N 80.4825°W

Information
- School type: Public
- School board: Waterloo Region District School Board
- School number: 540099
- Principal: Barb Tomkins
- Grades: JK-6
- Enrolment: 478 (November 2017)
- Language: Canadian English & French Immersion
- Website: sud.wrdsb.ca

Suddaby Public School, originally known as Central School, is a public elementary school in Kitchener, Ontario (formerly known as Berlin). It is located at 171 Frederick Street, in the city's downtown. It serves grades Junior Kindergarten (JK) through grade 6.

The school building opened in January 1857, and its first principal was Alex Young. Initially, the school building also accommodated the Berlin Grammar School (later the Berlin High School, now Kitchener-Waterloo Collegiate and Vocational School) in the second-floor room in the northeast corner of the building. In 1871, due to the growth in population of Berlin and due to school attendance having been made mandatory in Ontario, the school became quite crowded and the high school relocated elsewhere. Attendance continued to increase, and classes had to be held in Berlin's fire hall in 1874. In 1876, a four-room addition was built at the back of the school.

In 1877, Ontario's Minister of Education chose the school as a model school for the training of third class teachers. At that time Alex Young stepped down as principal and was replaced by Jeremiah Suddaby. In 1882, the first kindergarten in Ontario, taught by Miss Janet Metcalfe, was opened at the school. In 1886, accommodations again became inadequate. The Berlin Public School Board decided to resolve this problem by opening new schools—Agnes Street School (now King Edward Public School) in 1886, Courtland Avenue Public School in 1890, and Margaret Avenue Public School in 1894. The concept of model schools came to an end in 1908. Suddaby remained principal until his death in 1910, at which point the school was renamed in his honour.

In 1921 plans were made for a large addition to the school. The cornerstone of the new building was laid on June 10, 1922, and the addition was formally opened on September 24, 1923.

The school celebrated its 100th anniversary in 1957. At that time, the school's original bell was donated to Doon Heritage Crossroads.

On November 17, 1980, the school building was designated as a heritage property by Kitchener's city council under the provisions of the Ontario Heritage Act. The designation noted the facade, the archway between the main foyer, the archway between the main foyer and the original kindergarten, and the oil painting of Jeremiah Suddaby that was painted in 1912 by A. Y. Jackson, one of the original members of the Group of Seven.

The basement was home to a special-ed program called McQuarrie Enrichment Program. Unfortunately, the McQuarrie Enrichment Program was transferred to Cederbrae Public School and A.R. Kaufman Public School in 2011.

The school's most famous alumnus is William Lyon Mackenzie King, former Prime Minister of Canada.

== See also ==
- List of Waterloo Region, Ontario schools
