= Elizabeth Ziegler =

Canadian educator

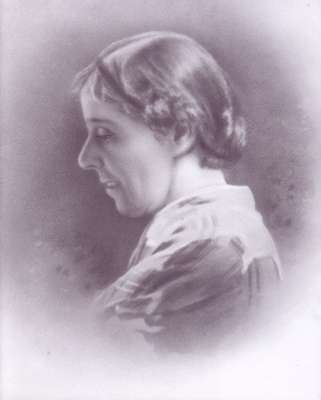
- Born: September 15, 1854; Berlin, Canada West
- Died: November 3, 1942 (aged 88); Simcoe, Ontario, Canada
- Resting place: Mount Hope Cemetery
- Occupation: Teacher

Elizabeth Ziegler (September 15, 1854 – November 3, 1942) was a Canadian educator. She is the namesake of Elizabeth Ziegler Public School in Waterloo, Ontario, and is a member of the Waterloo Region Hall of Fame.

== Early life and education ==
Ziegler was born September 15, 1854, in Berlin, Canada West (now Kitchener) to Enoch and Hannah (née Hallman) Ziegler. Educated at local schools, Elizabeth went on to study at the Toronto Normal School, graduating at 16 years of age. She was the youngest student to receive a teaching certificate from the school, which was signed by Egerton Ryerson, Ontario's first Minister of Education.

== Teaching career ==
After graduation she taught for a year in Breslau, followed by two years teaching in Bloomingdale. Ziegler returned to Waterloo County in 1875, after accepting a teaching position at Central School during a period when women made up less than half of the teaching staff in the area and were unable to marry if they wished to continue on as teachers. She taught a range of subjects at the school including reading, spelling, arithmetic, geography and drawing. Ziegler was later appointed as the principal of Alexandra School, Waterloo's second elementary school, making her the first woman principal appointed in Waterloo County. She retired from teaching in 1930. To mark her lengthy career the Canadian National Railway gifted her a return ticket to the Pacific Coast.

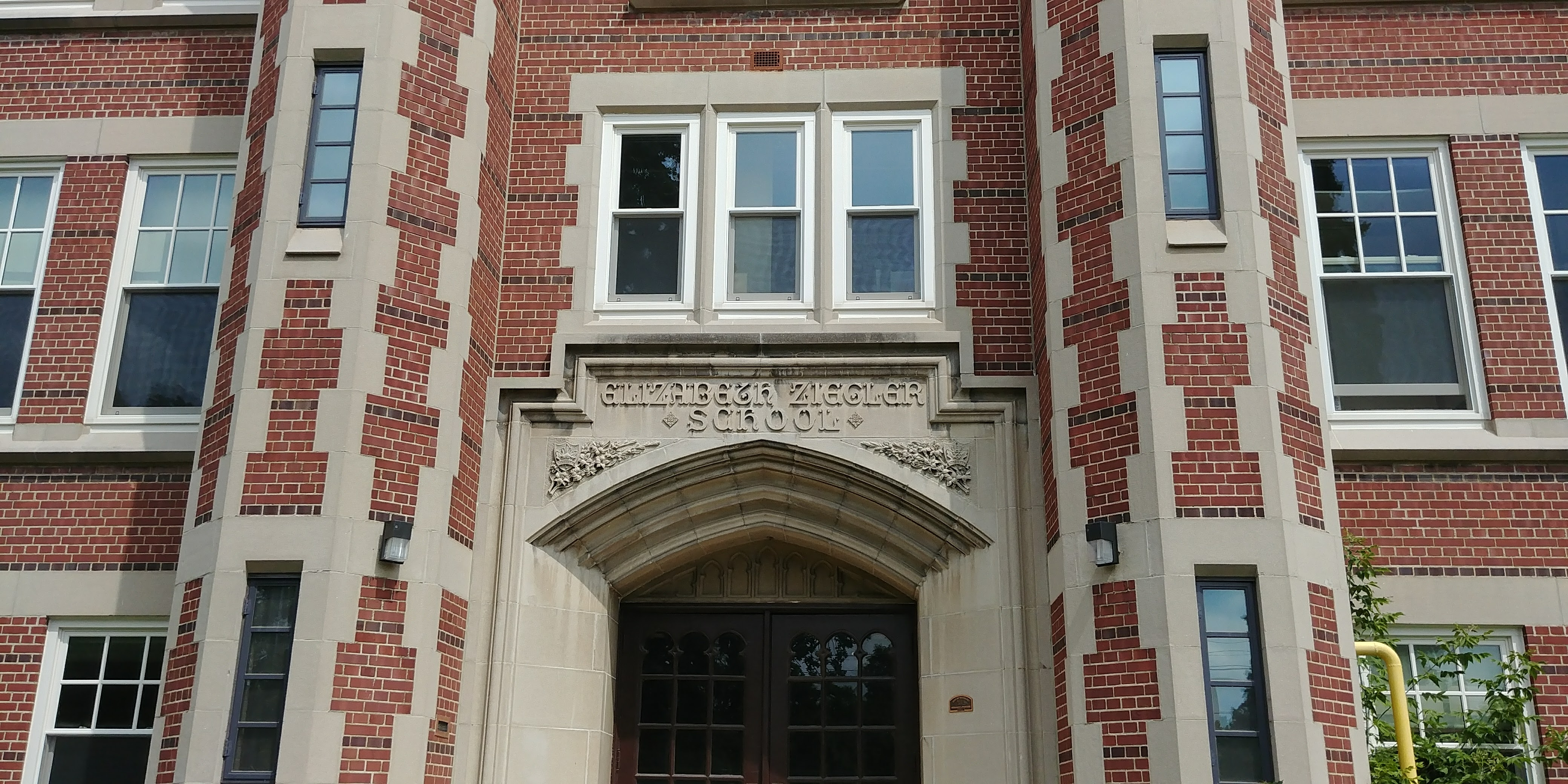
Entrance of Elizabeth Ziegler Public School with name engraved over doorway

When construction began on Waterloo's third elementary school, local teachers requested that it be named in Ziegler's honour. She initially resisted the recognition but was eventually persuaded by members of the Waterloo Public School Board. The school opening on September 2, 1931, was attended by Ontario Premier George Stewart Henry who commented that: "This splendid building is a monument to the purpose, integrity and inspiration of a woman who has helped fashion the lives of the citizens of this community and has helped them to make the best use of their lives." Her teaching certificate signed by Ryerson hangs at the school along with her portrait. In addition to having a school named after her, Ziegler is a member of the Waterloo Region Hall of Fame.

== Later life ==
Ziegler spent her later years living with family in Kitchener and London. In 1941 Ziegler moved to Simcoe to live with a sister, where she died a year later.
