= Romel Raffin =

Former Canadian Basketball Player

Personal information
- Born: April 23, 1954 (age 72) Kitchener, Ontario, Canada
- Listed height: 6 ft 9 in (2.06 m)
- Listed weight: 216 lb (98 kg)

Career information
- High school: Eastwood Collegiate (Kitchener, Ontario)
- College: Penn State (1974-78); Calgary (1979-80)
- Position: Center
- Number: 13

Career highlights
- 4x Olympian (1976, 1980, 1984, 1988); Captain of Canada men's national basketball team (1988); FISU gold medalist (1983); Canada West Conference First-team All-star (1980); Canada Basketball Hall of Fame (1996); Ontario Basketball Hall of Fame (2008)

Romel Raffin (born April 23, 1954) is a former Canadian basketball player and four-time Olympian. He is the only four-time Olympian in Canadian basketball history.

== High school ==
Raffin played at the high school level for Eastwood Collegiate Institute. He didn't begin playing basketball until his 12th grade. He and his teammates won the city and provincial championships, with Raffin being named the MVP of the provincial tournament.

== University ==
Raffin played for Penn State from 1974-1978. For the 1979-80 season, Raffin played for the University of Calgary, where he was named a first-team Canada West conference all-star.

== International ==
Raffin played for the Canada men's national basketball team beginning in 1974 and ending in 1988. This included being on four different teams which qualified for the Olympics (1976, 1980, 1984, 1988). Raffin is the only athlete in Canada basketball history to be named to four different Olympic teams.

=== 1988 Olympics ===
Raffin represented Canada in the 1988 Olympics. Raffin was named Canada's team captain in these Olympics.

Raffin performed well in these Olympic games, being Canada's second overall leader in assists (despite being a center) and being Canada's third overall leader in rebounds. Raffin had a notable performance against Spain, where he led all players in rebounds (8) and led Canada in assists (4). Canada finished 6th overall in these Olympics.

=== 1984 Olympics ===
Raffin represented Canada in the 1984 Olympics. Canada performed well in the tournament, finishing fourth overall after narrowly losing the bronze medal game. This 1984 bronze-medal game constituted the only time in the past 80+ years where Canada had a legitimate chance of winning an Olympic medal in basketball. This bronze medal game was highly competitive, being tied 18 times with 12 lead changes, with Canada being within one point with less than a minute of play remaining.

=== 1983 World Student Games ===
Raffin also represented Canada in the 1983 World Student Games, where Canada won gold. In the semifinal match of this tournament, Canada defeated a talented US team led by future NBA hall of famers Charles Barkley and Karl Malone. This 1983 gold medal win constituted one of the finest moments in Canadian basketball history, being the only time in which Canada has won the gold medal in an international basketball tournament.

=== 1980 Olympics ===
Raffin was named to the national team that qualified for the 1980 Moscow Olympics. However, Raffin and his teammates were unable to compete in these 1980 games given that Canada boycotted said Olympics as a result of the Soviet Union's invasion of Afghanistan.

This 1980 Canadian men's team was positioned to perform well in these Olympics given that Canada competed for the bronze medal in the Olympic games preceding and following these 1980 Olympics (1976, 1984) and this time in Canadian basketball has been described as "arguably the Canadian national team's greatest era" and "Canada's golden age of basketball".

=== 1976 Olympics ===
Raffin represented Canada in the 1976 Olympics. Canada performed well in these Olympics, again participating in the bronze medal game and finishing fourth overall, being one of the three times in the past 80 years in which Canada has competed for an Olympic medal in basketball. Raffin in the only Canadian Olympian to compete for two Olympic medals in basketball.

Raffin had noteworthy performances against Japan, where he scored 8 points in only 14 minutes of play; and against the Soviet Union, where he scored 8 points in only 17 minutes of play.

== Other international tournaments ==
Raffin represented Canada in additional international tournaments, including many Pan American Games, the 1974 FIBA World Championship, the 1980 American Olympic Qualifying Tournament for Men, the 1984 American Olympic Qualifying Tournament for Men and 1988 American Olympic Qualifying Tournament for Men. In the 1980 American Olympic qualifiers, Raffin was Canada's sixth overall scorer and in the 1988 American Olympic qualifiers, Raffin was second overall for Canada in rebounds per game.

== Professional / semi-professional career ==
Raffin played multiple seasons professionally in Italy and Venezuela. He also played in the Division One Senior Men's league in Calgary from 1981 to 1991, where he won numerous city championships.

== Post-career recognition ==
Raffin has been inducted into the Canada Basketball Hall of Fame (1996); the Ontario Basketball Hall of Fame (2008); and Eastwood Collegiate Institute's Wall of Recognition. The 1976 Canadian Olympic team, of which Raffin was part, was also inducted into the Canada Basketball Hall of Fame (2007).

== Personal life ==
Raffin was born on April 23, 1954. He has been a high school teacher, a high school basketball coach and a high school athletic director. His brother, Angelo Raffin, played for the Canadian Football League.
