= Waterloo Region District School Board =

School board in Ontario, Canada

Waterloo Region District School Board WRDSB

Location
- 51 Ardelt Ave. Kitchener, Ontario; N2C 2R5 Waterloo Region Canada

District information
- Director of education: Scott Miller (interim)
- Schools: 105 elementary; 16 secondary
- Budget: CA$675 million
- District ID: B66176

Students and staff
- Students: 64,712
- Staff: 6,808

Other information
- Elected trustees: B. Cody; C. Johnson; K. Meissner; S. Piatkowski; M. Radlein; M. Ramsay; M. Waseem; C. Watson; J. Weston; K. Woodcock
- Website: www.wrdsb.ca

Waterloo Region District School Board (WRDSB, known as English-language Public District School Board No. 24 prior to 1999) is the public school board for the Region of Waterloo in Ontario, Canada. It operates 105 elementary schools, 16 secondary schools, and other facilities, serving more than 64,000 students in the Region of Waterloo. It has approximately 6,800 staff and a budget of $675 million. It is the largest public sector employer in the Region and the second-largest employer overall. As of 2025, the interim Director of Education is Scott Miller.

The board serves Waterloo Region, which consists of the cities of Kitchener, Cambridge, and Waterloo, and the townships of Wellesley, Woolwich, Wilmot, and North Dumfries. Within the townships, WRDSB operates schools in the communities of Ayr, Baden, Breslau, Conestogo, Elmira, Floradale, Linwood, New Dundee, New Hamburg, St. Jacobs, and Wellesley.

Trustees are elected every four years by the public school ratepayers in their area. Four trustees are elected in Kitchener, three trustees are elected in each of Waterloo/Wilmot and Cambridge/North Dumfries and one trustee represents Elmira/Woolwich. Although trustees are elected in specific areas, once they are elected they must represent the entire region. Annually, two students are elected by their peers to represent the student voice on the school board. They have a voice at the table but no binding vote. Every year in December, the trustees elect a chair and vice-chair for the coming year. Board policy dictates that no one may serve in either role for more than two consecutive years. In 2016, the trustees published a new Strategic Plan consisting of three priorities to provide "first-class public education to Waterloo Region".

In January 2018, the Board announced that it was considering the building of up to 12 new schools and the expansion of 11 existing facilities over the subsequent years, due to an increasing population. An additional 7,100 new students were expected by 2027. At the same time, the Board was considering a study of the feasibility and benefits that might be provided by year-round schooling, but did not agree to proceed with a pilot programme. Their newest school, Oak Creek Public School, opened in September 2022.

The Waterloo Catholic District School Board operates the Catholic schools which educates approximately one of every three students in the Region.

== Safe and secure schools policy ==
The School Board was criticized for its role in maintaining a confidential file on Ronald Wayne Archer (Ron Archer), a teacher convicted in 2000 of four charges of sexual assault on his student. The file documented allegations that Archer sexually assaulted children beginning in the 1970s. In 2006, the Ontario College of Teachers revoked Archer's certificates of qualification and registration. Members of the public believed that had the file been disclosed, subsequent abuse would have been prevented. In 2001, the Board created new policies to prevent abuse in future.

A Safe and Secure Schools policy was developed including a Code of Conduct that outlines expected behaviour standards of all members of the school community: students, parents, guardians, volunteers, staff and visitors.

In 2017 It's OK to be white posters were taped to the doors of two collegiate institutes. A spokesman for the school board said "Our schools are safe spaces. We want to see them be safe for all of our children, so to see this kind of thing emerge is a worry."

== List of Elementary Schools ==
Name	City/Town
Abraham Erb PS	Waterloo
Alpine PS	Kitchener
Avenue Road PS	Cambridge
Ayr PS	Ayr
Baden PS	Baden
Blair Road PS	Cambridge
Blue Heron PS	Cambridge
Breslau PS	Breslau
Bridgeport PS	Kitchener
Brigadoon PS	Kitchener
Cedar Creek PS	Ayr
Cedarbrae PS	Waterloo
Centennial PS	Cambridge
Centennial PS	Waterloo
Central PS	Cambridge
Chalmers Street PS	Cambridge
Chicopee Hills PS	Kitchener
Clemens Mill PS	Cambridge
Conestogo PS	Conestogo
Coronation PS	Cambridge
Country Hills PS	Kitchener
Courtland Avenue PS	Kitchener
Crestview PS	Kitchener
Doon PS	Kitchener
Driftwood Park PS	Kitchener
Edna Staebler PS	Waterloo
Elgin Street PS	Cambridge
Elizabeth Ziegler PS	Waterloo
Empire PS	Waterloo
Floradale PS	Elmira
Forest Glen PS	New Hamburg
Forest Hill PS	Kitchener
Franklin PS	Kitchener
Glencairn PS	Kitchener
Grand View PS	Cambridge
Grandview PS	New Hamburg
Groh PS	Kitchener
Hespeler PS	Cambridge
Highland PS	Cambridge
Hillcrest PS	Cambridge
Hillside PS	Kitchener
Howard Robertson PS	Kitchener
J F Carmichael PS	Kitchener
J W Gerth PS	Kitchener
Janet Metcalfe PS	Kitchener
Jean Steckle PS	Kitchener
John Darling PS	Kitchener
John Mahood PS	Elmira
Keatsway PS	Waterloo
King Edward PS	Kitchener
Lackner Woods PS	Kitchener
Laurelwood PS	Waterloo
Laurentian PS	Kitchener
Lester B Pearson PS	Waterloo
Lexington PS	Waterloo
Lincoln Heights PS	Waterloo
Linwood PS	Linwood
MacGregor PS	Waterloo
Mackenzie King PS	Kitchener
Manchester PS	Cambridge
Margaret Avenue PS	Kitchener
Mary Johnston PS	Waterloo
Meadowlane PS	Kitchener
Millen Woods PS	Waterloo
Moffat Creek PS	Cambridge
N A MacEachern PS	Waterloo
New Dundee PS	New Dundee
Northlake Woods PS	Waterloo
Oak Creek PS	Kitchener
Park Manor PS	Elmira
Parkway PS	Cambridge
Pioneer Park PS	Kitchener
Preston PS	Cambridge
Prueter PS	Kitchener
Queen Elizabeth PS	Kitchener
Queensmount PS	Kitchener
Riverside PS	Elmira
Rockway PS	Kitchener
Saginaw PS	Cambridge
Sandhills PS	Kitchener
Sandowne PS	Waterloo
Sheppard PS	Kitchener
Silverheights PS	Cambridge
Sir Adam Beck PS	Baden
Smithson PS	Kitchener
Southridge PS	Kitchener
St. Andrew's PS	Cambridge
St. Jacobs PS	St. Jacobs
Stanley Park PS	Kitchener
Stewart Avenue PS	Cambridge
Suddaby PS	Kitchener
Sunnyside PS	Kitchener
Tait Street PS	Cambridge
Trillium PS	Kitchener
Vista Hills PS	Waterloo
W.T. Townshend PS	Kitchener
Wellesley PS	Wellesley
Westheights PS	Kitchener
Westmount PS	Kitchener
Westvale PS	Waterloo
William G Davis PS	Cambridge
Williamsburg PS	Kitchener
Wilson Avenue PS	Kitchener
Winston Churchill PS	Waterloo
Woodland Park PS	Cambridge

== List of Secondary Schools ==
School	City/Town	Year Founded	Enrollment (2024-2025 Preliminary)
Bluevale Collegiate Institute	Waterloo	1972	1,115
Cameron Heights Collegiate Institute	Kitchener	1969	1,765
Eastwood Collegiate Institute	Kitchener	1956	1,270
Elmira District Secondary School	Elmira	1939	1,305
Forest Heights Collegiate Institute	Kitchener	1964	1,555
Galt Collegiate Institute and Vocational School	Cambridge	1852	960
Glenview Park Secondary School	Cambridge	1957	1,055
Grand River Collegiate Institute	Kitchener	1966	1,560
Huron Heights Secondary School	Kitchener	2006	1,455
Jacob Hespeler Secondary School	Cambridge	c. 1990	1,070
Kitchener-Waterloo Collegiate and Vocational School	Kitchener	1855	1,650
Laurel Heights Secondary School	Waterloo	2004	1,765
Preston High School	Cambridge	1934	855
Southwood Secondary School	Cambridge	1962	700
Waterloo Collegiate Institute	Waterloo	1960	1,480
Waterloo-Oxford District Secondary School	Baden	1955	1,460

== See also ==
- Education in Ontario
- List of Waterloo Region, Ontario schools
- List of school districts in Ontario
- List of high schools in Ontario
