= Waterloo-Oxford District Secondary School =

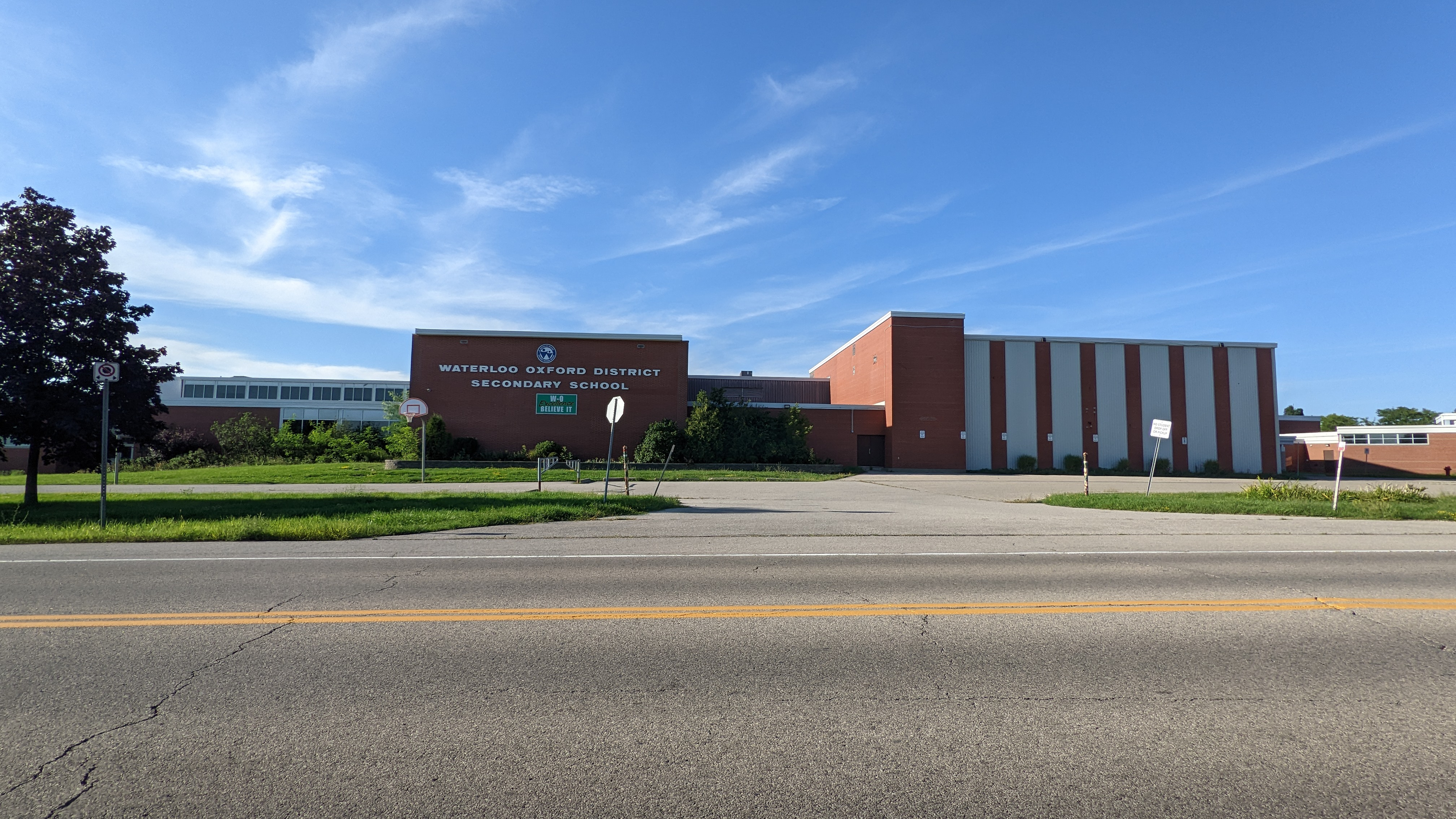

Location
- 1206 Snyder's Road West; Baden, Ontario, N3A 1A4; Canada; 43.40141°N 80.68964°W

Information
- School type: Public
- Motto: Carpe diem (Seize the day)
- Founded: 1955
- School board: Waterloo Region District School Board
- School number: 00420
- Principal: David Linnerth
- Grades: 9-12
- Enrollment: 1,283 (2019-2020)
- Colours: Green and White
- Mascot: Chubby the Crusader (retired 2019)
- Team name: Waterloo-Oxford DSS
- Website: wodss.wrdsb.on.ca

Waterloo-Oxford District Secondary School is a high school just outside Baden, Ontario, Canada operated by the Waterloo Region District School Board. It opened in 1955 and is one of two rural high schools in Waterloo Region, the other being Elmira District Secondary School. W-O serves a student population of 1,283 (2019–2020), primarily from Waterloo Region, Oxford County, and Perth County. Its school colours are green and white.

At the time of Waterloo-Oxford's 50th reunion in 2005, it was estimated that 10,000 alumni had graduated from the school.

In 1999, the school—situated on a rural highway—applied for an exemption from the Ontario legislation banning smoking on school property. The request was denied, but in 2000 the Township of Wilmot agreed to lease a piece of land on school property, allowing students to smoke some distance away from highway traffic, without contravening the smoking ban.

In 2006 Waterloo Oxford held its first Relay for Life event in coordination with the Canadian Cancer society and raised over $50 000. From 1995 to 1999 The Jr. and Sr. Boys Rugby team became the first team in school history to go 4 straight years without a regular season loss. This team won 4 County Championships, 3 Regional Championships and 2 OFSAA Championships during this time, making them the most decorated Rugby program in Waterloo Region. These records still stand today. Waterloo-Oxford is most notable for its Rugby teams. The Senior Boys Rugby team has won twelve WCSSAA Championships, including the 2015 title. In addition, the Junior Boys have won nine WCSSAA titles, including the 2013 title and the girls Rugby team has eight WCSSAA titles. Also, the Girls Basketball teams have had a great run since 2011, winning both a Senior and Junior WCSSAA title and appearing in two CWOSSAA championship games and losing this year's WCSSAA title after going undefeated through the regular season. Other sports that have had moments of strength include boys Volleyball, girls Field Hockey and more recently, Girls Slow Pitch. Wrestling, power-lifting, football, hockey and badminton round out the varsity sports. The school prides itself on offering a great variety of sports and activities, but recent cuts in after school buses has had a negative effect on participation rates.

== Notable alumni ==
- Benjamin Alarie, law professor and tech entrepreneur
- Harold Albrecht, former MP for the riding of Kitchener—Conestoga
- John English, historian and former MP for the riding of Kitchener
- James Nicoll, science fiction commentator and former game store owner, who once described the school as "a very rural high school, where 'alternative life style' meant 'Not Old Order Mennonite'"
- Graeme Smith, correspondent for The Globe and Mail

== See also ==
- Education in Ontario
- List of secondary schools in Ontario
