= Kitchener Market station =

Light rail station in Kitchener, Ontario

Kitchener Market
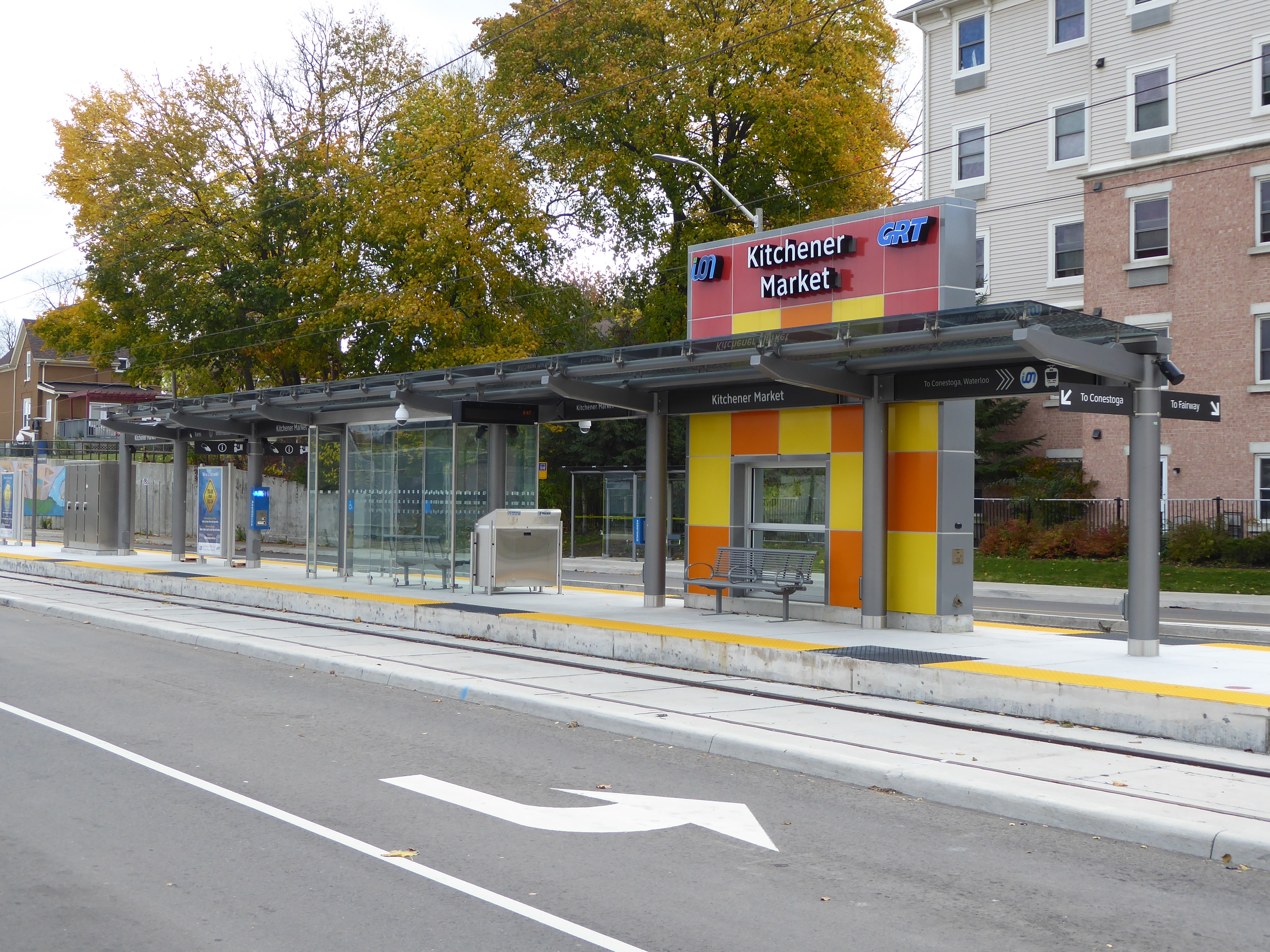
- Station structurally complete, November 2017

General information
- Location: Kitchener, Ontario; Canada
- Coordinates: 43°26′47″N 80°29′01″W
- Platforms: Centre platform
- Tracks: 2
- Bus routes: 1
- Bus operators: Grand River Transit
- Connections: 3 Ottawa South

Construction
- Accessible: Yes

Other information
- Status: Open

History
- Opened: June 21, 2019

Services
Preceding station	Grand River Transit	Following station
Frederick One-way operation	Ion	Borden toward Fairway
Queen toward Conestoga	Ion	Borden toward Fairway
Location

Kitchener Market is a stop on the Ion rapid transit system in the Region of Waterloo in Ontario, Canada. It is located in the Cedar Hill neighbourhood at the intersection of Charles and Cedar streets, about 100 metres (330 ft) south of its namesake, the Kitchener Farmer's Market. The station initially had a working name of Cedar, and it opened in 2019.

== History ==
Before the launch of the Ion light rail service, the intersection was the location of the Charles / Cedar Grand River Transit stop, which was served by the 200 iXpress bus, Ion's direct predecessor.

In the City of Kitchener's 2013 Planning Around Rapid Transit Stations (PARTS) planning document, Kitchener Market (still referred to as Cedar) is grouped with other downtown stations as part of the "Central" area, and is referred to as a local station, noting the amenities in the area. This is in contrast with Central Station, intended to be the city's main intercity hub, and stations such as Frederick, which are connection points to crosstown iXpress services.

== Station layout ==
Kitchener Market is a bidirectional two-track light rail station with an island platform in the middle of Charles Street, immediately southeast of the intersection with Cedar Street. It has two flanking bus stops on either side of Charles Street, with connections available to local buses.

The primary access to the platform is from the crosswalk at Cedar Street; secondary accesses at the east end of the platform, crossing either side of Charles Street, are marked as emergency exits only.

The station's feature wall consists of ceramic tiles in a pattern of red, orange and yellow.

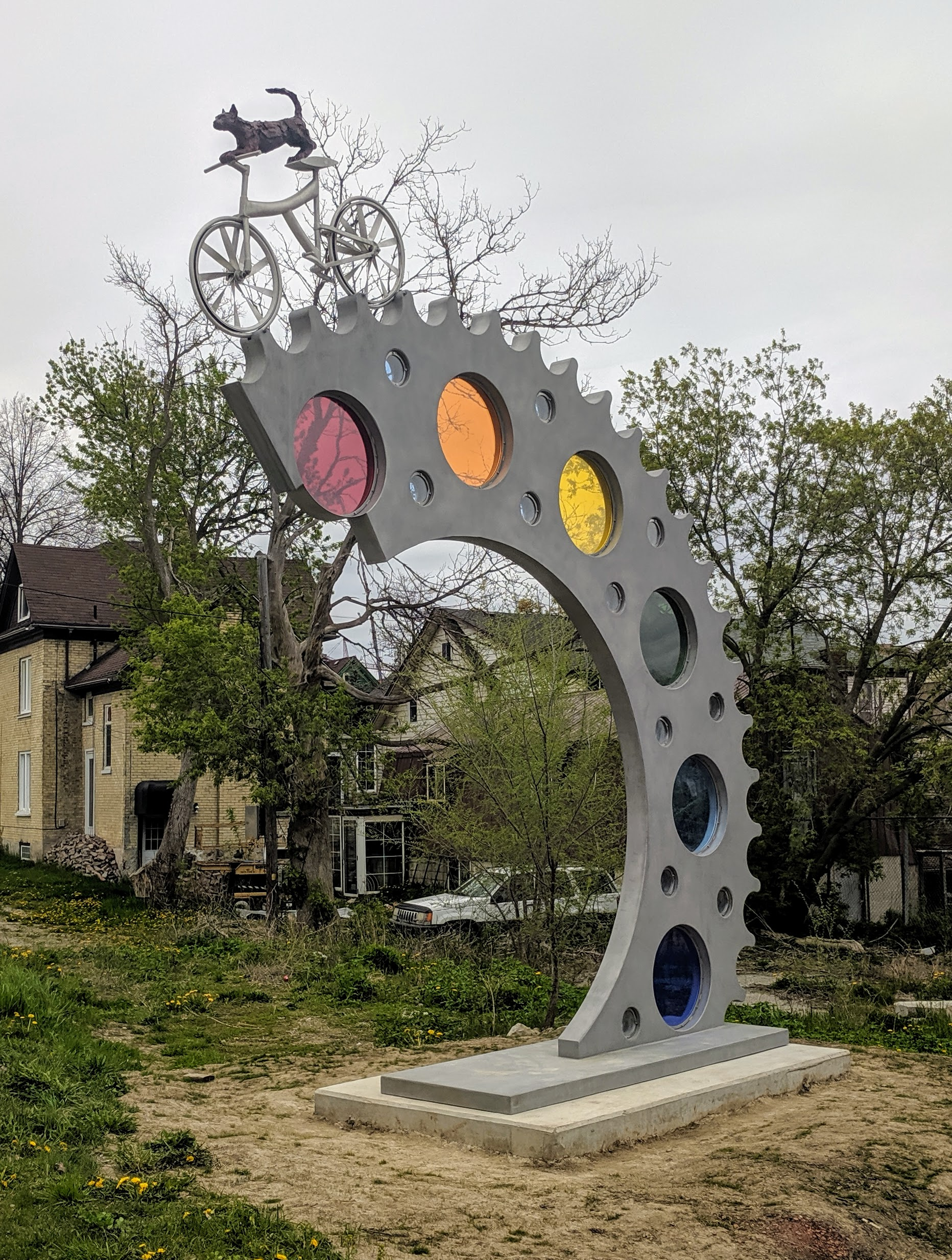
Because Cats Can’t Fly

The station features the artwork Because Cats Can’t Fly by Veronica and Edwin Dam de Nogales about the hard work during the region's industrial past, and a reminder to find time to play.

== Urban environment ==
The Kitchener Farmer's Market is a major attraction in the area, as well as the station's namesake.

Cameron Heights Collegiate Institute, a local public high school, is located nearby.

Though not part of the rapid transit project, visible from the station platform is a new mural erected in 2017 on a neighbouring retaining wall. Created by local arts collective Neruda Arts, it alludes to numerous First Nations themes.
