= Elizabeth Ziegler Public School =

Location
- 90 Moore Avenue South; Waterloo, Ontario, N2J 1X2; Canada; 43°27′53″N 80°30′43″W

Information
- School type: State school, Primary school
- Opened: September 2, 1931
- School board: Waterloo Region District School Board
- School number: 171417
- Principal: Susan Marchiori
- Grades: JK-6 & Gr.5/6 congregated enrichment
- Enrollment: 421 (2015)
- Language: English
- Area: Moore & Union
- Colours: Blue and Yellow
- Mascot: EZ Tiger
- Team name: Tigers
- Website: elz.wrdsb.ca
- Last updated: 2016-03-05

Elizabeth Ziegler Public School is an elementary school located in Waterloo, Ontario, at 90 Moore Avenue South, roughly one kilometre east of Waterloo's city centre. As of 2009, the school serves junior kindergarten through grade 6. Its principal is currently Ms. Susan Marchiori, and it has a vice principal, Ms. MacNeill. The school also currently hosts one mixed grade 5&6 enrichment class for gifted students. In 2005 the school was ranked 971st out of 2,850 elementary schools in Ontario by the Fraser Institute, based on the results of grade 3 and 6 students on province-wide standardized tests.

The school was named after local teacher Elizabeth Ziegler, who had taught in Waterloo for 55 years. The original building was designed by Frank W. Warren of Hamilton and construction overseen by Alex Schnarr of Waterloo. It was officially opened on September 2, 1931 by George Henry, then the Premier of Ontario. At the time, it was Waterloo's third public elementary school. The first principal was C. J. MacGregor. Between 1940 and 1950 the school also housed some grade 9 classes because of overcrowding at Kitchener-Waterloo Collegiate and Vocational School.

On December 16, 1985, the school building was designated by the City of Waterloo as a heritage landmark under the provisions of the Ontario Heritage Act. The building was built in Gothic Revival style and cost $121,999 to build, a significant expenditure during the Great Depression. The building was three stories tall and originally had 16 rooms, including double-sized rooms for household science, kindergarten, manual training, and assembly. Included in the design of the school was a nod to Waterloo's official flower, the gladiolus, which Warren had carved above the main entrance. Two extensions were later made, one in 1955 and another, consisting mainly of a gymnasium, in 1987.

The school, which as of 2016 is the oldest school in Waterloo that is still operating, celebrated its 75th anniversary in 2006. Students celebrated on June 21, 2006 and an open house was held on October 14, 2006.

Lennox Lewis, former heavyweight boxing champion, attended the school in the late 1970s.

== See also ==
- List of historic places in Regional Municipality of Waterloo
- List of oldest buildings and structures in the Regional Municipality of Waterloo
