= Forest Heights Collegiate Institute =

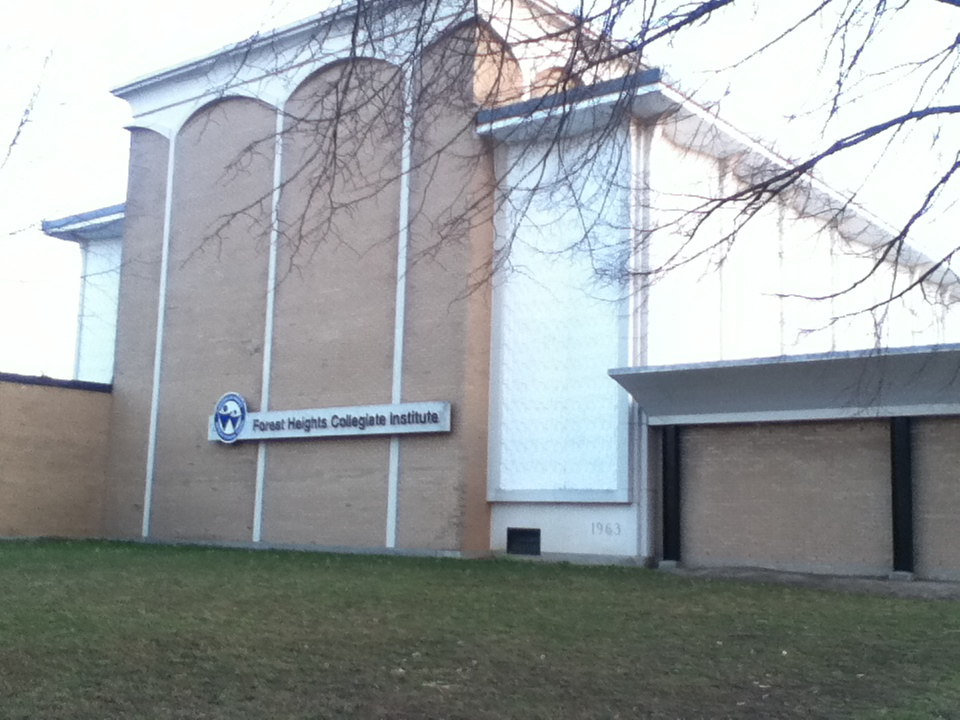

Location
- 255 Fischer-Hallman Road; Kitchener, Ontario, N2M 4X8; Canada; 43°25′32.48″N 80°31′16.46″W

Information
- School type: Secondary
- Motto: Sit Tuum Tollere (Yours to hold high)
- Founded: 1964
- School board: Waterloo Region District School Board
- School number: 910350
- Principal: Paula Bender
- Vice-Principals: Lara Shantz; Giampiero Del Rizzo; Dave Williamson
- Staff: 125
- Grades: 9-12
- Enrollment: 1,200 (2024-2025)
- Language: English
- Area: Forest Heights
- Mascot: Troy the Trojan
- Team name: Trojans
- Website: fhc.wrdsb.ca

Forest Heights Collegiate Institute (FHCI), shortened as Forest Heights or simply Forest, is a high school in Kitchener, Ontario, Canada that was established in 1964. It is run by the Waterloo Region District School Board (WRDSB). As of the 2024–2025 school year, Forest Heights has approximately 1200 students.

FHCI serves the youth of the Northwest Kitchener, ON by “receiving its students from A.R. Kaufman Public School, Laurentian Senior Public School, MacGregor Senior Public School, Queensmount Public School and Westheights Public School.” The school draws many of its students from the Forest Heights neighbourhood for which it was named, as well as the adjacent neighbourhood of Forest Hill.

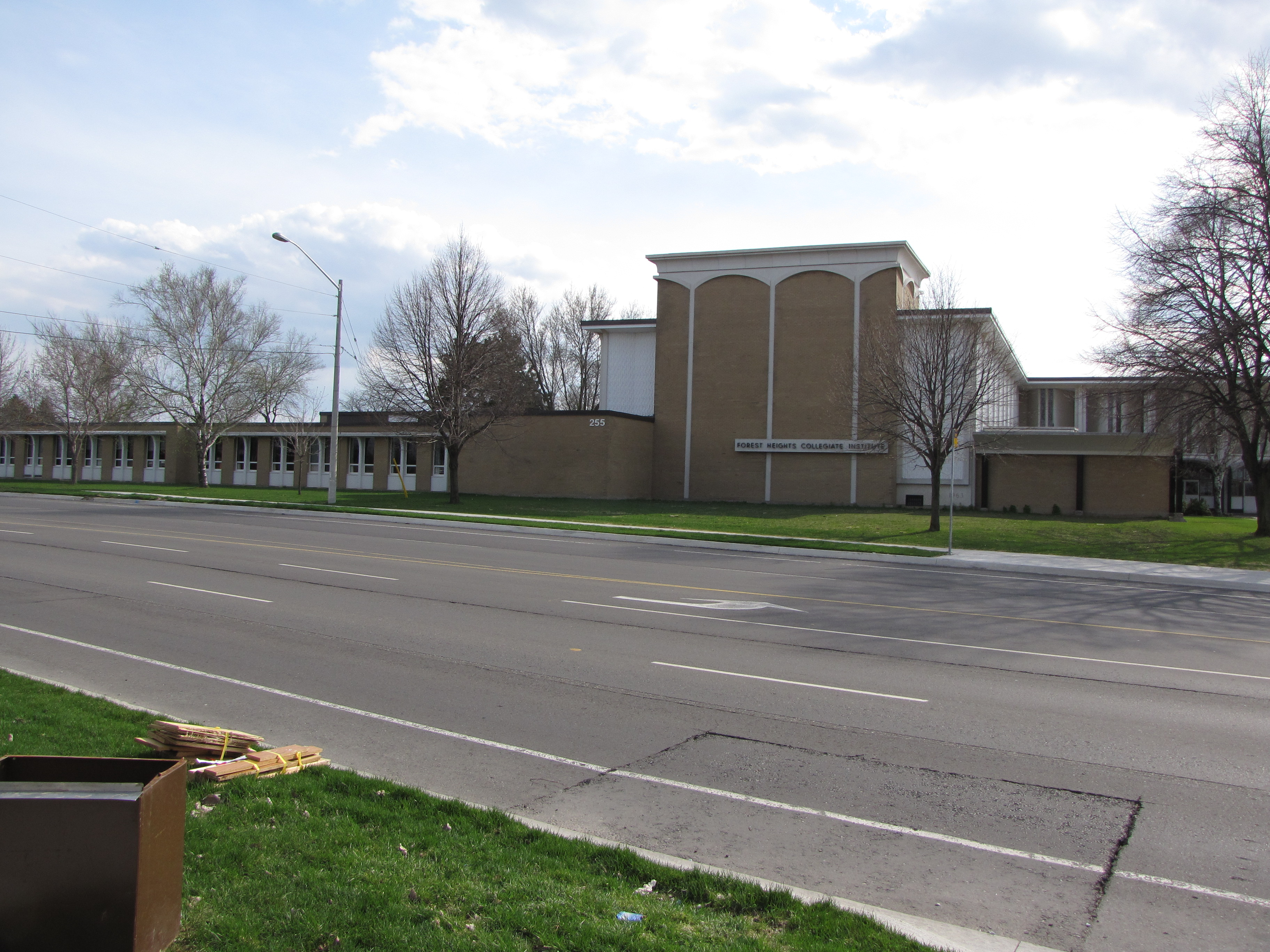

== History ==
In 2016, a vice principal of Forest Heights was charged with sexual interference and sexual assault. The vice principal was also an administrator for the Waterloo Region District School Board.

== Motto and colours ==
The school motto is "sit tuum tollere", meaning "Yours to hold high". “This motto encourages “students to take the lead in developing these qualities within themselves as important, contributing members of society.” The mascot is a Trojan warrior, which symbolizes a collection of allies fighting together using bravery, courage, and innovation. The mascot has recently been named “Troy the Trojan” by the students attending the school. The official school colours are gold and brown, but black is used in the sports uniforms and school clothing because brown pigments are not regularly used for such products. While this hold true, students attending will say that the school colours are gold, black, and white. These three colours are commonly used for event decorations, posters, announcements, and sports uniforms.

== Programs offered ==
Forest Heights has become a magnet school for English as a Second Language (ESL) students and Extended French, as a result of the restructuring of Waterloo Region District School Board (WRDSB) schools. Each district school functions as a magnet for a specific aspect of schooling (i.e. design & technology, ESL, creative arts).

The school is host to many magnet and specialized programs which support the academic journey of the students at Forest Heights. These programs include: "The Forest Heights Collegiate English Literacy Development (ELD) Program, the Forest Heights Collegiate English as a Second Language (ESL) Program, the Extended French Magnet Program, ACE (the Alternative Education Program), and Specialist High School Major (SHSM) Program.”.

== Academic performance ==
The Ontario Secondary School Literacy Test (OSSLT) examination traditionally takes place at the end of the month of March or the beginning of the month of April. At Forest Heights, the exam has a 79.00% success rate for the students in the 10th grade. This is slightly below the average for the average Ontario-English student, which has a score of 82.00%.

== See also ==
- Education in Ontario
- List of secondary schools in Ontario
