= Kitchener-Waterloo Collegiate and Vocational School =

Location
- 787 King Street West; Kitchener, Ontario, N2G 1E3; Canada; 43°27′20.88″N 80°30′31.03″W

Information
- School type: Secondary school
- Motto: Veritas Vincat (May Truth Prevail)
- Founded: 1855
- School board: Waterloo Region District School Board
- School number: 920495
- Principal: Sue Martin
- Grades: 9–12
- Enrolment: 1473 (March 2023)
- Language: English & French Immersion
- Colours: Red, yellow, and black
- Mascot: Rodney Raider (Pirate)
- Team name: Raiders
- Website: kci.wrdsb.ca

Kitchener-Waterloo Collegiate and Vocational School, commonly called Kitchener Collegiate Institute or KCI, is a public secondary school in Kitchener, Ontario, Canada. It is a member of the Waterloo Region District School Board. The school dates from 1855, making it one of the oldest high schools in Kitchener and Waterloo. Its sports teams are known as the Raiders.

== History ==
The school opened on April 2, 1855, as the Berlin Senior Boys' Grammar School. It was initially located at the corner of King and Eby streets in the downtown area; tuition was five shillings per month. From 1857 to 1871, it occupied space in the Berlin Central School (now Suddaby Public School) on Frederick Street. Girls were admitted to the school in 1866. With increasing numbers at the Central School, the school moved to the former Swedenborgian Church on Church Street.

In 1874, $650 was spent to purchase land at the school's current location on King Street West, closer to the Waterloo border. The building cost $5,804 and opened in 1876. It was now called Berlin High School (Ontario legislation passed in 1871 renamed grammar schools "high schools").

In 1876, science teacher David Forsyth pioneered laboratory experiments. By 1891, the curriculum had grown to include commercial subjects, music, manual training, and athletics.

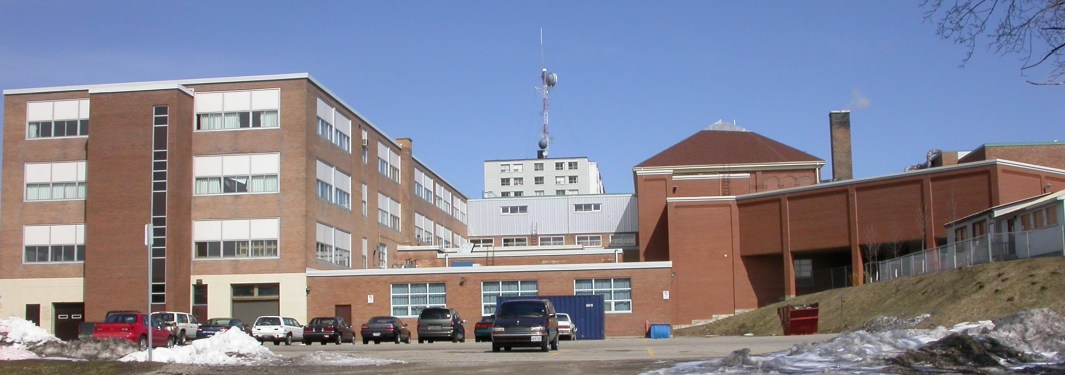
Many of the school's eleven additions are visible in this photograph of the back of the school. The 1903-04 addition is the centre right with the peaked roof.

In 1903, building commenced on the first of ten additions to the school. During construction, some classes were moved to the Kitchener City Hall and Carnegie library. On November 30, 1904, a Provincial-Order-in-Council raised the school to the status of a collegiate institute, and the school was renamed the Berlin Collegiate Institute. By 1905 the new building was in use. The school's name changed to Kitchener Collegiate Institute, along with the city, in 1916 during the First World War.

By 1919, office and other rooms were being used as classrooms. As the Dominion and Provincial governments had recently announced a policy to assist with school funding, the municipality eventually approved an expansion plan in 1921. The plan called for demolishing the 1876 building, modernizing the 1903-04 building, which still stands, and placing in front of it a new gymnasium, auditorium, front hall, and classrooms, including a classroom east wing. Construction started on July 2, 1922, and the new school opened on September 4, 1923. At the formal opening on April 4, 1924, the school received its current name, Kitchener Collegiate and Vocational Institute.

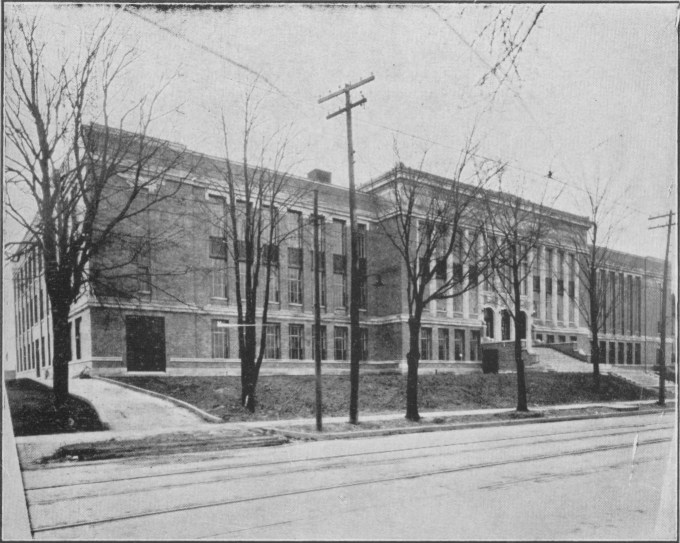

The 1924 enrolment of 550 students had increased to 1,418 students by 1932. Because of cramped conditions, grade 9 classes were held in downtown Victoria Public School and in neighbouring King Edward Public School from 1933 to 1951, when the west-wing addition was completed.

In 1948, KCI introduced driver education, one of the first schools to do so.

In 1955, KCI celebrated its 100th anniversary, the only public high school in Kitchener and Waterloo. However, in 1956, Eastwood Collegiate Institute opened, the first of seven additional high schools built in the following 20 years. Several of their principals were former KCI teachers.

In 1969, the Kitchener and Waterloo High School Board was succeeded by the Waterloo County Board of Education, now the Waterloo Region District School Board (WRDSB).

In the 1970s, the City of Kitchener designated the school foyer as a heritage structure under the provisions of the Ontario Heritage Act.

At the school's 125th anniversary celebrations on the weekend of May 16–18, 1980, more than 6,000 former students took part.

In 2003, public outcry ensued when the WRDSB proposed closing KCI in order to open Huron Heights Secondary School in southwest Kitchener, as required under the provincial funding model of the time. Critics of this proposal noted that KCI had a significant history and a unique culture among regional secondary schools, including its diverse student body. Further financial analysis of the financial situation by trustees determined that no need for a Kitchener school closure, and the WRDSB decided to update KCI's aging infrastructure. Regardless of the enormous job and associated costs,

In 2004, football coach Ed Dietrich was selected runner-up "NFL/CFL High School Coach of the Year".

In 2005, the school celebrated its 150th anniversary reunion from May 27–29.

In 2006, the school underwent extensive renovations, funded by the provincial government. Some students are concerned that there is still no air conditioning.

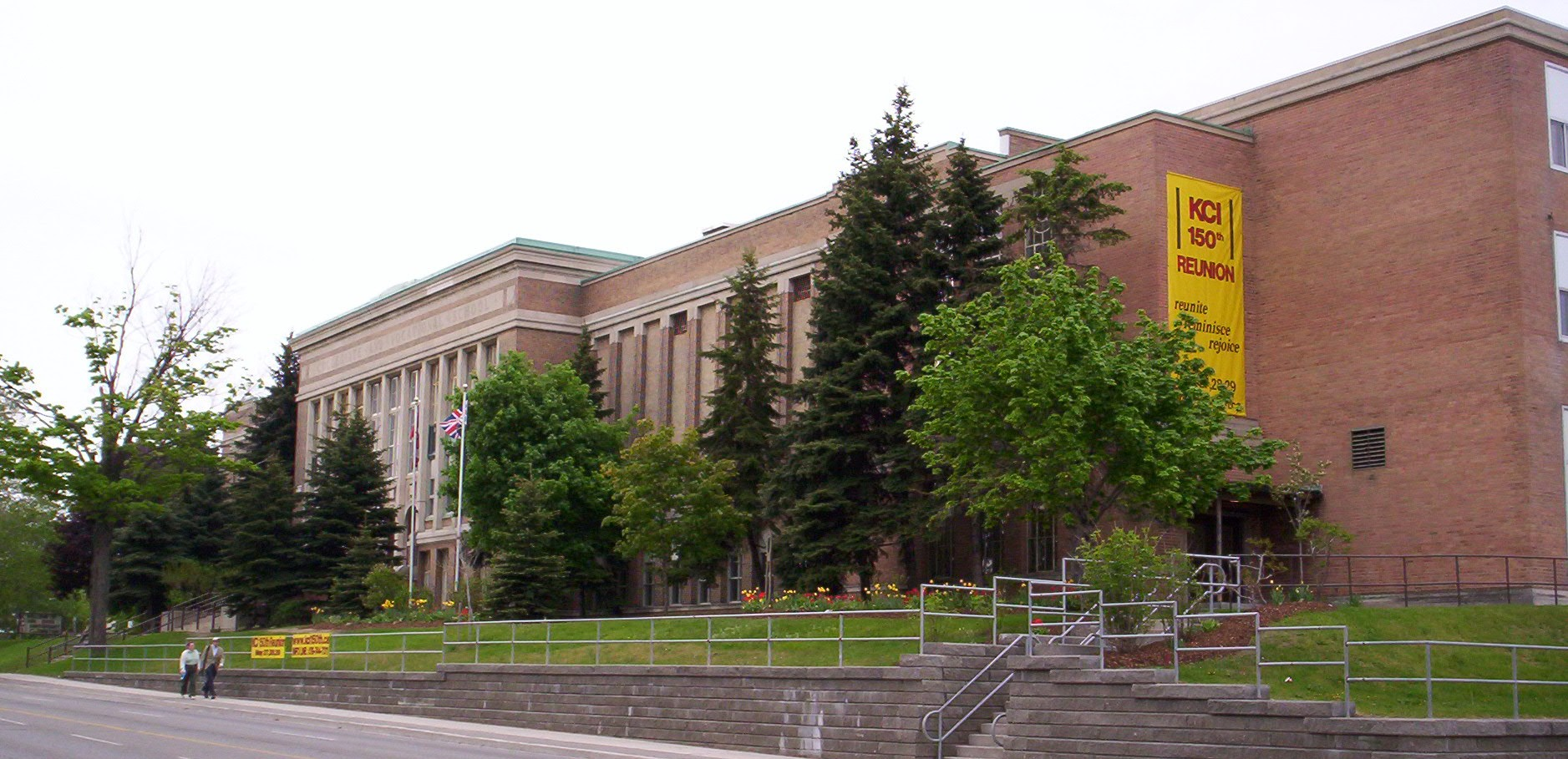
Building facade, 2005

In March 2017, KCI opened its renovated main office. The space now includes a new meeting room, staff mailbox area and unisex washrooms; construction used wood reclaimed from the original office.

== Traditions ==
The school colours are red, yellow, and black (adopted from the flag of Germany because of the city's German heritage), and its motto is Veritas Vincat (Latin, May Truth Prevail); until 1916 the motto was Höher Hinauf (German, To the Heights). At various points since his introduction, there have been contentious debates about the propriety of the former school mascot, a First Nations raider named Rodney. Citing the issue of racism and pressure from special interest groups, the school changed the mascot to a pirate while maintaining the "Raider" name.

== Notable alumni ==
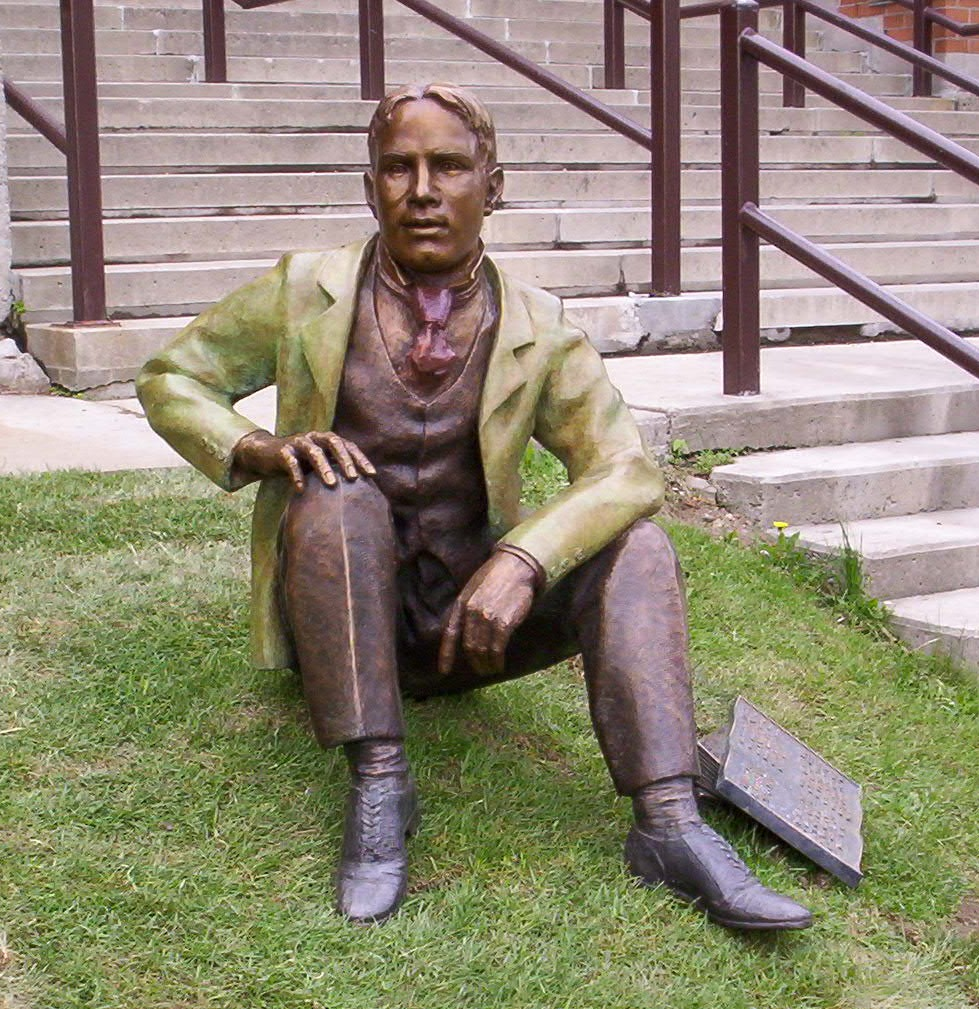
Statue of W.L.M. King, on the school's lawn

The most famous alumnus of the school was William Lyon Mackenzie King, Prime Minister of Canada for more than 21 years, who was a student between 1887 and 1891. During the school's 150th anniversary celebrations, a statue of him as a student was unveiled on the front lawn of the school.

Other noted alumni and former students of the school include:

- Art Binkowski, boxer
- George Herbert Bowlby, physician, surgeon, mayor, and major in the Canadian Army Medical Corps
- June Callwood, journalist and activist
- Micky Colton, female Canadian Military pilot
- William Daum Euler (student 1891–1893), Minister of National Revenue between 1927 and 1930
- Jack Gibson (graduated 1896), hockey player and member of the Hockey Hall of Fame.
- Nick Hector, filmmaker and academic
- Matt Hughes, author
- François Charles Archile Jeanneret, academic
- Kenneth Millar, (attended 1930–1932; taught at the school 1939–1941) author, creator of Lew Archer
- Al MacInnis, National Hockey League Hall of Famer 1981–2003
- Margaret Millar née Sturm, novelist, mystery and suspense writer
- Miranda Ranieri, squash player
- Jeremy Ratchford, actor
- Milt Schmidt, National Hockey League player, member of the Hockey Hall of Fame
- Master T, television and radio personality
- Alexi Zentner, author

== See also ==
- Education in Ontario
- List of Waterloo Region, Ontario schools
- List of secondary schools in Ontario
- List of oldest buildings and structures in the Regional Municipality of Waterloo
