= James Nicoll =

Canadian game and speculative fiction reviewer (born 1961)

- Born: March 18, 1961 (age 65)

External image
- James Nicoll, 2001 photo

James Davis Nicoll (born March 18, 1961) is a Canadian freelance game and speculative fiction reviewer, former security guard and role-playing game store owner, and five-time Hugo nominee, who also works as a first reader for the Science Fiction Book Club. As a Usenet personality, Nicoll is known for writing a widely quoted epigram on the English language, as well as for his accounts of suffering a high number of accidents, which he has narrated over the years in Usenet groups like rec.arts.sf.written and rec.arts.sf.fandom. He is now a blogger on Dreamwidth and Facebook, and an occasional columnist on Reactor and The Beaverton. In 2014, he started his website, jamesdavisnicoll.com, dedicated to his book reviews of works old and new; and later added Young People Read Old SFF, where his panel of younger readers read pre-1980 science fiction and fantasy, and Nicoll and his collaborators report on the younger readers' reactions.

== Background ==
Nicoll was born March 18, 1961, and grew up in rural Ontario. He wrote on Usenet that "[b]efore it exploded one night, I went to a four grade, two room schoolhouse and we had textbooks from the 1940s." He attended Waterloo-Oxford District Secondary School, which he described as "a very rural high school, where 'alternative life style' meant 'Not Old Order Mennonite'".

== Influence on SF genre ==
In addition to his influence as a first reader for the Science Fiction Book Club, a book reviewer for Bookspan, Publishers Weekly and Romantic Times, and a juror for the James Tiptree, Jr. Award, Nicoll often offers ideas and concepts to other writers, primarily through the medium of Usenet. After winning the 2006 Locus Award for his novella Missile Gap, Charles Stross thanked him, writing that Nicoll "came up with the original insane setting—then kindly gave me permission to take his idea and run with it."

== "The Purity of the English Language" ==
In 1990, in the Usenet group rec.arts.sf-lovers, Nicoll wrote the following epigram on the English language:

The problem with defending the purity of the English language is that English is about as pure as a cribhouse whore. We don't just borrow words; on occasion, English has pursued other languages down alleyways to beat them unconscious and riffle their pockets for new vocabulary.

(A followup to the original post acknowledged that the spelling of "riffle" was a common misspelling of "rifle".)

The epigram has also been quoted, with proper attribution, in books by professor of rhetoric and communication design Randy Harris. Amateur linguists Jeremy Smith, Richard Lederer, the Chinese newspaper Ming Pao and Anu Garg have also referenced Nicoll's quote.

Professional linguists who have referenced the quotation online include Professor of Linguistics Mark Liberman of the University of Pennsylvania and Language Log; Associate Professor of Linguistics Suzanne Kemmer of Rice University, who also posted her research into the quote at the LINGUIST mailing list; and Second Language Acquisition Ph.D. student Rong Liu. There are also amateur philologists who have used the quote, including journalist Suw Charman and journalist Vale White.

== "Nicoll events" ==
Nicoll relates a number of life- and/or limb-threatening accidents that have happened to him, which he has told and retold on various science fiction fandom–related newsgroups. Over the years these stories have also been collected into Cally Soukup's List of Nicoll events.

Inspired by Nicoll's collection of accidents, as well as his tendency to take in any stray cat that comes knocking, fantasy author Jo Walton wrote him a poem in 2002.

== "Brain eater" ==
A post on soc.history.what-if credits Nicoll with coining the phrase "brain eater" which is supposed to "get" certain writers such as Poul Anderson and James P. Hogan. Nicoll claims the 'brain eater' affected Hogan, because of Hogan's expressions of belief in Immanuel Velikovsky's version of catastrophism, and his advocacy of the hypothesis that AIDS is caused by pharmaceutical use rather than HIV (see AIDS denialism). The term has been adopted by other Usenet posters, as well as elsewhere on the Internet and use of the term within Usenet has been criticised.

== Nicoll-Dyson Laser ==
Nicoll proposed the Nicoll-Dyson Laser concept where the satellites of a Dyson swarm act as a phased array laser emitter capable of delivering their energy to a planet-sized target at a range of millions of light years.

E. E. Smith first used the general idea of concentrating the sun's energy in a weapon in the Lensman series when the Galactic Patrol developed the sunbeam (in Second Stage Lensmen); however, his concept did not extend to the details of the Nicoll-Dyson Laser. The 2012 novel The Rapture of the Nerds by Cory Doctorow and Charles Stross uses the Nicoll-Dyson Laser concept by name as the means by which the Galactic Federation threatens to destroy the Earth.

== Science-fictional Lysenkoism ==
In a discussion on rec.arts.sf.written about why Golden Age science fiction so often uses aliens said to derive from short-lived but well-known stars such as Rigel whose lifespan is probably too brief to ever allow the rise of life due to the long-established mass-luminosity relationship for main-sequence stars, Nicoll identified what he termed the "SFnal Lysenkoist Tendency when actual, tested science contradicts some detail in an SF story, attack the science." He expanded on this idea in an article for online science fiction and fantasy magazine Tor.com.

== Awards ==
Nicoll was a finalist for the 2010, 2011, 2019, 2020, 2024, and 2026 Hugo Awards for Best Fan Writer. He served as a judge for the 2012 James Tiptree Jr. Award. In 2021, 2022, 2023 and 2024, he was nominated for the Aurora Award for Best Fan Writing and Publication, for the series "Young People Read Old SFF" published on his review website.

Nicoll has also been a Fan Guest of Honor (GoH) at SF conventions, including ConFusion 2013 in Detroit and Arisia 2014 in Boston. In 2020, he was nominated for the Down Under Fan Fund, to visit science fiction fandom in Australasia as a representative of their North American counterparts.
