= Waterloo Collegiate Institute =

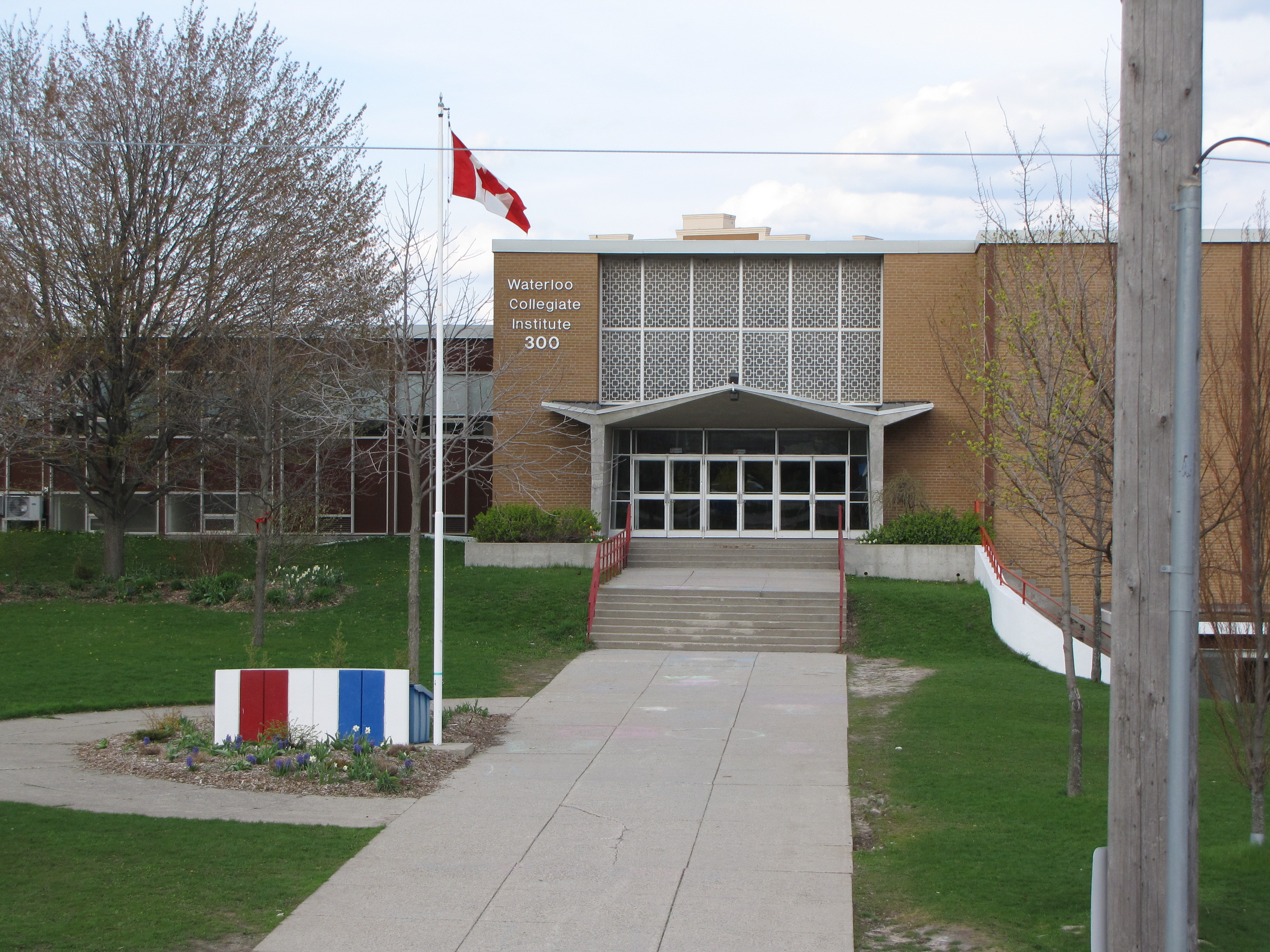
- Waterloo Collegiate Institute front view

Location
- 300 Hazel Street; Waterloo, Ontario, N2L 3P2; Canada; 43.4792°N 80.5300°W

Information
- School type: Public
- Motto: Excelsior
- Founded: 1960
- School board: Waterloo Region District School Board
- Principal: Ryan Hume
- Grades: 9-12
- Enrollment: 1,550 (2023-24)
- Colours: Red, Blue, White
- Mascot: Thor
- Team name: Vikings
- Website: wci.wrdsb.ca

Waterloo Collegiate Institute (WCI) is a secondary school in Waterloo, Ontario, Canada. The school is run by the Waterloo Region District School Board. During the 2019–2020 school year, 1,475 students were enrolled at the school. It has magnet programs including English as a Second Language (E.S.L.), Extended French, Geography and Strings instruments. On June 4, 2010, the school celebrated its 50th anniversary.

== History ==
In November 2020, the school held a walkathon, which aimed to raise $35,000 and reunite a family who left children behind in Turkey. They pledged to walk 9,731 kilometers and raised over $20,000 as of November 2020.

== Athletics ==
Waterloo Collegiate Institute offers multiple sports programs throughout the school year. During the fall, the following sports are offered: basketball (girls), cross country (boys and girls), golf (boys and girls), field hockey (girls), football (boys), soccer (junior boys), tennis (senior boys, senior girls), and volleyball (boys).

The following sports are offered during the winter: alpine skiing (boys and girls), basketball (boys), curling (boys and girls), ice hockey (boys and girls), swimming (boys and girls), and volleyball (girls).

Finally, the following sports are offered during the spring: badminton (boys and girls), rugby (boys and girls), soccer (senior boys, girls), slow-pitch softball (boys and girls), tennis (junior boys, junior girls), and track and field (boys and girls).

== Special programs ==
=== Pre-Advanced Placement Programs ===
The Pre-AP Program at Waterloo Collegiate is not a prescribed curriculum but rather an enriched experience to enhance current curriculum standards. Pre-AP courses include English, Math, and Science, among other disciplines. In 2015, the average score on AP exams written by WCI students was 4.13 (out of 5).

=== Advanced Placement Programs ===
The Advanced Placement (AP) program consists of a number of enrichment courses and related examinations. These courses are comparable to university courses. Successful students may be granted advanced placement or credit at universities. This is a new initiative for 2004–05 at WCI only. This is not a magnet program but does still attract students from various backgrounds. Students from other school catchments areas wishing to enroll at Waterloo Collegiate to take Advanced Placement Courses must get a principal to principal transfer from their home school in order to attend Waterloo Collegiate. School board officials may or may not grant transfers to students who wish to move schools to attend non-magnet programs.

=== Strings Magnet Program ===
The Waterloo Collegiate String Program is focused around the development of a broad range of musical skills, with performance being the main vehicle for learning.

One of the aspects of the Waterloo Collegiate String Program is its extra-curricular String Orchestra program. Waterloo Collegiate's Junior and Senior String Orchestras had received numerous top awards at international and regional competitions. The Waterloo Collegiate String Orchestras have performed at the Kitchener-Waterloo Arts Awards, Ontario Newspaper Awards (held last year in Waterloo), Kitchener-Waterloo Kiwanis Music Festival, in addition to ongoing performances at Waterloo Collegiate's feeder schools and surrounding high schools.

=== Cisco Networking Academy ===
The Cisco Networking Academy is the Cisco Certified online learning course for computer networking and computer engineering. From a completely online curriculum, students learn how to create networks, and repair, build & format computers. This course was unique to Waterloo Collegiate Institute as it was the only location in southern Ontario to offer Cisco Certified courses, but the program was suddenly discontinued in the 2010-2011 year. Cisco later extended to other secondary schools in South Western Ontario including St. Christopher Secondary School.

== Notable alumni ==
- The Honourable Bardish Chagger, Member of Parliament for the riding of Waterloo
- C. Ernst Harth, character actor.
- Ian Logan, Canadian football player
- Michael McDonald, poker player
- John Mitchell, ice hockey player
- Logan Stanley, ice hockey player

== See also ==
- Education in Ontario
- List of Waterloo Region, Ontario schools
- List of secondary schools in Ontario
