= Cameron Heights, Edmonton =

Cameron Heights
- Neighbourhood
- Location of Cameron Heights in Edmonton
- Coordinates: 53.473°N 113.635°W
- Country: Canada
- Province: Alberta
- City: Edmonton
- Quadrant: NW
- Ward: sipiwiyiniwak
- Sector: West

Government
  - Administrative body: Edmonton City Council
  - Councillor: Thu Parmar

Area
  - Total: 0.79 km^{2} (0.31 sq mi)
- Elevation: 681 m (2,234 ft)

Population (2012)
  - Total: 1,125
  - Density: 1,424.1/km^{2} (3,688/sq mi)
  - Change (2009–12): ▲105.7%
  - Dwellings: 463

Cameron Heights is a neighbourhood in west Edmonton, Alberta, Canada overlooking the North Saskatchewan River valley.

It is bounded on the south by Anthony Henday Drive, on the north and west by a ravine, and on the east by the North Saskatchewan River valley. It is named for former school board member and Edmonton Town Council alderman John Cameron. The neighbourhood of Wedgewood Heights is located on the north side of the ravine.

The only roadway into the neighbourhood is Cameron Heights Drive from the south. The Anthony Henday provides access to destinations to the south of the city including the Edmonton International Airport.

== Demographics ==
In the City of Edmonton's 2012 municipal census, Cameron Heights had a population of 1,125 living in 463 dwellings, a 105.7% change from its 2009 population of 547. With a land area of 0.79 km^{2} (0.31 sq mi), it had a population density of 1,424.1 people/km^{2} in 2012.
