= Huron Heights Secondary School (Kitchener) =

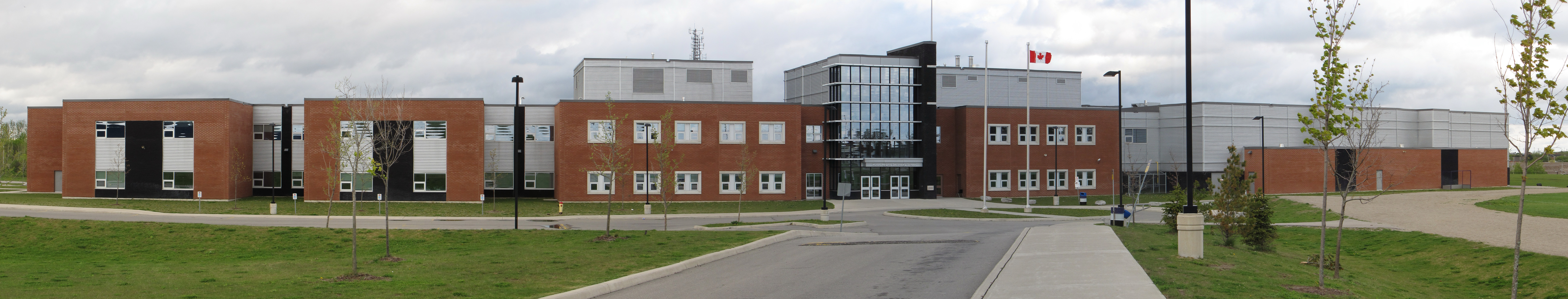

Location
- 1825 Strasburg Road; Kitchener, Ontario, N2R 1K3; Canada; 43°23′41.45″N 80°27′58.58″W

Information
- School type: High School
- Motto: E Concordia Fortitudo (As Huskies, we all pull together!)
- Founded: 2006
- School board: Waterloo Region District School Board
- Superintendent: Bill Lemon
- School number: 917931
- Principal: Jennifer Bistolas
- Grades: 9-12
- Enrollment: 1 540 (November 2017)
- Language: English
- Area: Kitchener
- Colours: Purple, Silver, Black and White
- Mascot: Husky
- Team name: Huskies
- Website: hrh.wrdsb.ca

Huron Heights Secondary School is a high school in Kitchener, Ontario, Canada. As of the 2019–2020 school year, 1,600 students attend the school. It is located at 1825 Strasburg Road, on the intersection between Strasburg and Huron Road. The school opened on September 5, 2006. Its student body and its sports teams are known as the Huskies.

== History ==
New students were introduced gradually. The first year; only grades 9 and 10 attended, and grades 11 and 12 were added each successive year of operation. A Developmental Education class was added in 2007. The fall of 2009 saw the inaugural grade 12 graduation ceremony for the initial grade 10 students who opened the school.

As of February 2019, the school has become overcrowded. The school has over 12 portables, and is continuing to add more. The lunch period was split into two to reduce crowds, and classes are overcrowded, including science labs, and gyms.

== Academics ==
The school offers 7 Specialist High Skills Major (SHSM) programs, which are Arts and Culture, Environment, Health and Wellness, Non- Profit, Sport, Business, and Transportation.

== Achievement ==
In the 2018–2019 school year, 74% of students passed Ontario's Literacy Test on their first attempt, as compared to the provincial average of 80%. In the same year, 88% of Grade 9 Academic Math students achieved the provincial standard, (as compared to 84% throughout the province) and 59% of Grade 9 Applied Math students achieved the provincial standard, (as compared to 44% throughout the province).

== See also ==
- Education in Ontario
- List of Waterloo Region, Ontario schools
- List of secondary schools in Ontario
