= Cameron Heights Collegiate Institute =

High school in Kitchener, Ontario, Canada

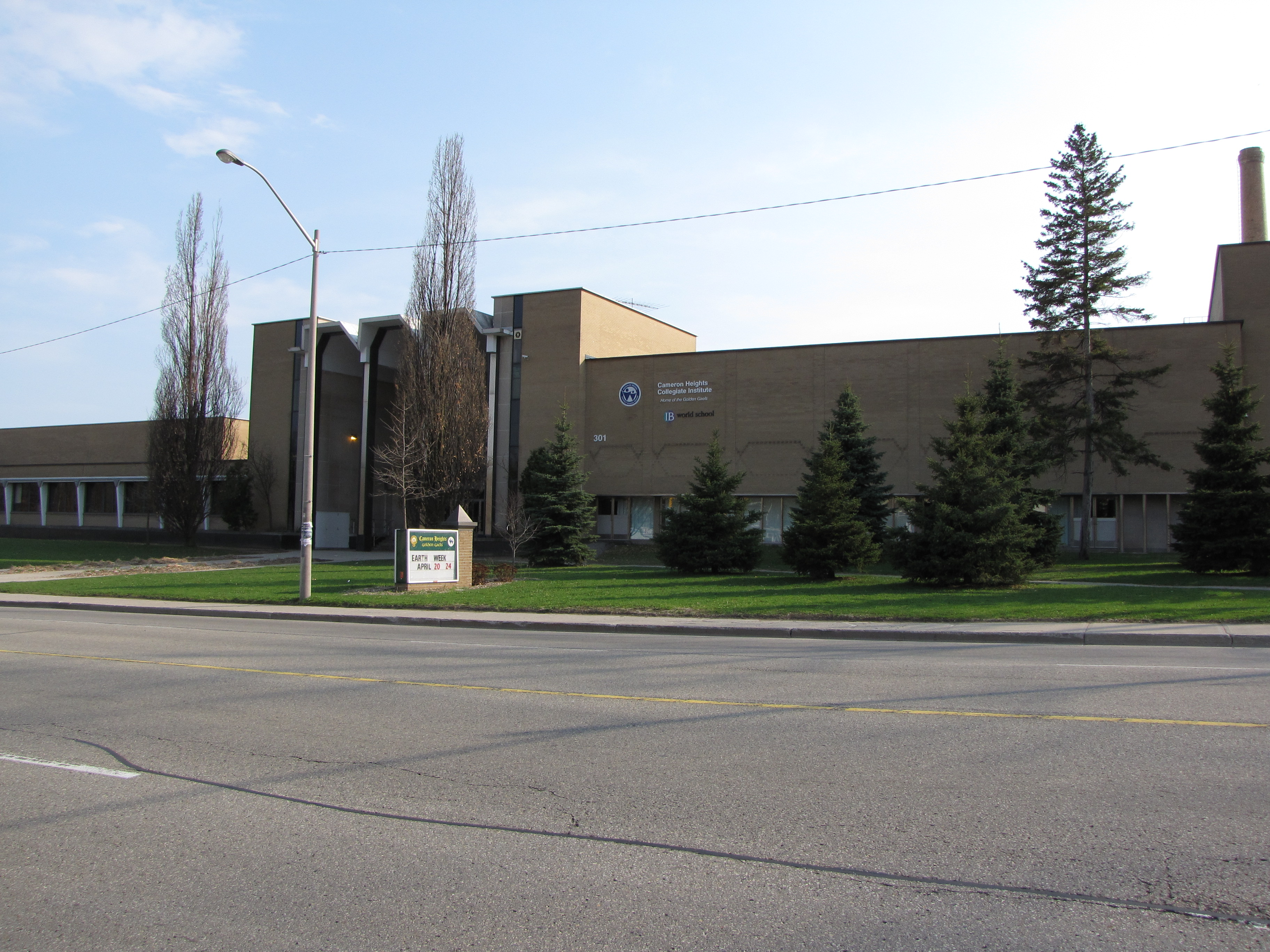
- Exterior view

Location
- 301 Charles Street East; Kitchener, Ontario, N2G 2P8; Canada; 43°26′40.49″N 80°28′54.08″W

Information
- School type: High school
- Founded: 1969
- School board: Waterloo Region District School Board
- School number: 898090
- Principal: Dennis Haid
- Vice-Principals: Kerri Beirnes; Dave Linnerth; Denise Rapson
- Grades: 9-12
- Enrollment: 1,715 (2021–2022)
- Colours: Gold, Green and Red
- Mascot: Scotty
- Team name: The Golden Gaels
- Website: chc.wrdsb.ca

Cameron Heights Collegiate Institute is a public secondary school in Kitchener, Ontario, run by the Waterloo Region District School Board. It is part of the International Baccalaureate (IB) program. The school is located at 301 Charles St. E. As of the 2021–2022 school year, the school has 1,715 students. The school is also one of only two secondary schools in Ontario with its own campus radio station.

== Rankings within Waterloo Region ==
As of 2026, Cameron Heights ranks 4th in the Waterloo Region on the Fraser Institute rankings, behind Laurel Heights, David St. Jacques, and St. David School.

In the 2024-2025 school year, 74% of the Grade 9 students met the provincial standard in math, the 3rd-highest in the Waterloo Region, behind Laurel Heights (83%) and Bluevale Collegiate Institute (75%).

== IB program ==
The International Baccalaureate's (IB) Diploma Programme is a two-year curriculum, primarily for students aged 16 to 19. Previous to the two years of enrolling into the IB program, students may enroll in taking "Pre-IB" courses. Higher level (HL) courses offered include Biology, Chemistry, History, Psychology, and English. Standard level (SL) courses offered include Mathematics Analysis and Approaches, a choice between French B or Spanish Ab Initio, and a choice between Business Management, Visual Arts, Physics, or Chemistry. While Mathematics Applications and Interpretations was previously offered, it was removed due to low enrollment. The Extended Essay, Theory of Knowledge (IB Course), and CAS make up the rest of the IB Diploma.

== Sports and clubs ==
The school's teams are known as the Golden Gaels, and Cameron's mascot is Scotty, the Golden Gael. The school also has a radio station known as "88.5 Gael FM", and provides radio shows daily for the school (morning, and lunch time). The CHCI Debate Team is particularly active, attending Nationals and North Americans four years running. The Multicultural Club also puts on a multi-cultural show every year that draws hundreds of spectators from around the KW area. The school has won 6 straight WCSSAA track and field championships, 5 consecutive CWOSSA appearances for the senior boys curling team, 5 WCSSAA titles in 6 years for the cross country team, as well as OFSAA gold by badminton and tennis athletes.

== Architecture ==
The school was built in 1967. At the time, it was the largest secondary school built in Ontario in one phase. At the front entrance to the school is a tall three-arch portico constructed out of stainless steel. There are two datestones by the entrance, one of which is inscribed "1867" (Canada's year of confederacy).

== Transportation ==
The school is located on Charles St. E. in Kitchener, Ontario, one block east of Kitchener Market ION light rail station. Local Grand River Transit bus routes that stop nearby are the 2, 3, 6, 7, and 8.

== Notable alumni ==
- Lennox Lewis, former undisputed heavyweight boxing champion
- Bernie Ruoff, CFL All-Star football player
- Ronnie Pfeffer, CFL placekicker, 2x Grey Cup Champion
- Liza Fromer, journalist
- Tracy Ryan, actress
- Scott Stevens, NHL All-Star hockey player
- Aaron Wilson, NLL lacrosse player
- Robbyn Hermitage, Olympic badminton player
- Tyler Varga, NFL running back, Indianapolis Colts

== See also ==
- Education in Ontario
- List of secondary schools in Ontario
- List of Waterloo Region, Ontario schools
