= Angelo Raffin =

Canadian football player (born 1946)

Profile
- Position: Guard

Personal information
- Born: April 27, 1946 (age 80); San Lorenzo, Italy
- Listed height: 6 ft 4 in (1.93 m)
- Listed weight: 240 lb (109 kg)

Career history
- 1970: Montreal Alouettes
- 1971: Toronto Argonauts

Awards and highlights
- Grey Cup champion (1970)

Angelo Raffin (born April 27, 1946) was an Italian professional Canadian football player who played for the Montreal Alouettes and Toronto Argonauts. He won the Grey Cup with Montreal in 1970.
