= District 8 Athletic Association =

- Abbreviation: D8
- Formation: 1990
- Headquarters: Waterloo Catholic District School Board 35 Weber Street West
- Location: Kitchener, Ontario
- Region served: Waterloo Region
- Members: 8 schools
- President: Chris Woodcroft
- Vice President: Jim Stickland
- Athletic Coordinator: Derrick Stryker
- Website: http://www.district8.ca

District 8 Athletic Association administers secondary school sports servicing the Catholic and Independent high schools of the Kitchener, Waterloo and Cambridge region. It is a member of Central Western Ontario Secondary Schools Association and Ontario Federation of School Athletic Associations.

== Member Schools ==
District 8 comprises eight member schools.

- École secondaire Père-René-de-Galinée
- Monsignor Doyle Catholic Secondary School
- Resurrection Catholic Secondary School
- Rockway Mennonite Collegiate
- St. Benedict Catholic Secondary School (Cambridge)
- St. David Catholic Secondary School
- St. Mary's High School (Kitchener)
- Woodland Christian High School

== Sports ==
- Badminton
- Basketball
- Cross Country
- Field Hockey
- Golf
- Swimming
- Tennis
- Track and Field
- Volleyball

== WCSSAA ==
District 8 schools have playing privileges as a guests in the Waterloo County Secondary School Athletics Association (WCSSAA). Leagues which District 8 are a part of are:

- Alpine Skiing
- Curling
- Ice hockey
- Wrestling
