= Menno Singers =

Choral group

The Menno Singers are a choral group based in Waterloo Region, Ontario, Canada. They perform mainly sacred works and frequently sing a cappella. The Menno Singers frequently perform with their affiliated groups, the Inter-Mennonite Children's Choir and the Menno Youth Singers.

== History ==
The Menno Singers were founded in 1955 by Abner Martin, who acted as the group's first conductor. Many of the original members were graduates of Rockway Mennonite High School.

In the 1970s,the group began organizing combined concerts with other choral groups in the area, under the name Mennonite Mass Choir.

The choir is affiliated with Conrad Grebel College at the University of Waterloo; in 1990 the music director was William H. Janzen Jr.

In 1999 Peter Nikiforuk became the artistic director of the group, and remained in this position until 2017. In 2000 the choir performed in Toronto with the Kitchener-Waterloo Symphony.

In 2002 the Singers took part in the Toronto International Choral Festival.

The Menno Singers received a $15,000 grant from the Region of Waterloo in 2017 to fund a special concert on the occasion of Nikiforuk's retirement, and for the commissioning of a musical composition by composer Colin Labadie and poet Amanda Jernigan.
