= École secondaire Père-René-de-Galinée =

École secondaire catholique Père-René-de-Galinée
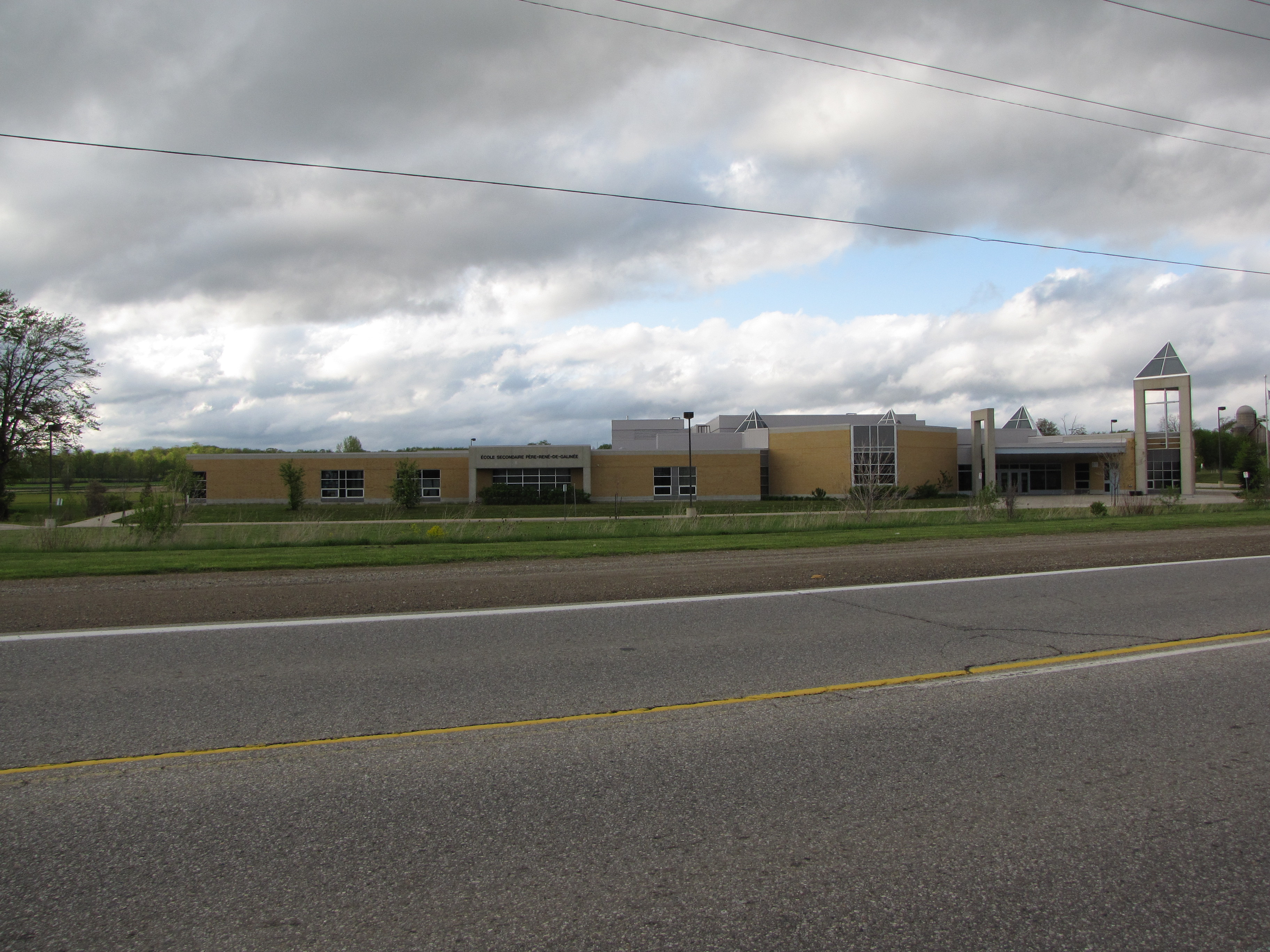

Location
- 450 Maple Grove Road; Cambridge, Ontario, N3H 4R7; Canada; 43°25′29″N 80°22′58″W

Information
- School type: Separate school
- Motto: Je m'implique, Je m'engage, Je réussis! (French: "I'm involved, I'm engaged, I succeed!)
- Religious affiliation: Roman Catholic
- Established: 1996
- School board: Conseil scolaire catholique MonAvenir
- Area trustee: Dorothée Petit-Pas
- Principal: Luc Renaud
- Staff: 78 (2024)
- Grades: 7-12
- Enrolment: 740 (2024)
- Language: French
- Area: Cambridge
- Colours: Navy Blue, Black, Grey and White
- Mascot: Knight
- Team name: Les Chevaliers / Les Chevalières
- Feeder schools: École élémentaire catholique Cardinal-Léger, École élémentaire catholique Saint-Noël-Chabanel, École élémentaire catholique Mère-Élisabeth-Bruyère, and École élémentaire catholique St-René-Goupil
- Website: esprdg.cscmonavenir.ca

École secondaire catholique Père-René-de-Galinée, also known as PRDG, is a French Catholic secondary school located in Cambridge, Ontario, Canada. The school, founded in 1996 after the creation of CSDCCS, is part of the Conseil scolaire catholique MonAvenir. The school teaches students in grades 7 to 12.

== Events and Academics ==
PRDG is renowned in Waterloo Region ranking among the region's top schools with an overall Fraser Institute rating of 7.8 out of 10 for its high standard of French education as well as its International Baccalaureate program.

Offering the Middle Years program, students are challenged to think outside the box in order to solve issues of the day.

=== Beamline for Schools Competition Victory (June 2017) ===
In June 2017, a team of students from teacher Denis Jacques' physics class at PRDG won first prize in the international Beamline for Schools particle physics competition organized by CERN. The competition involved 180 teams from 43 countries and challenged students to design experiments using a particle accelerator.

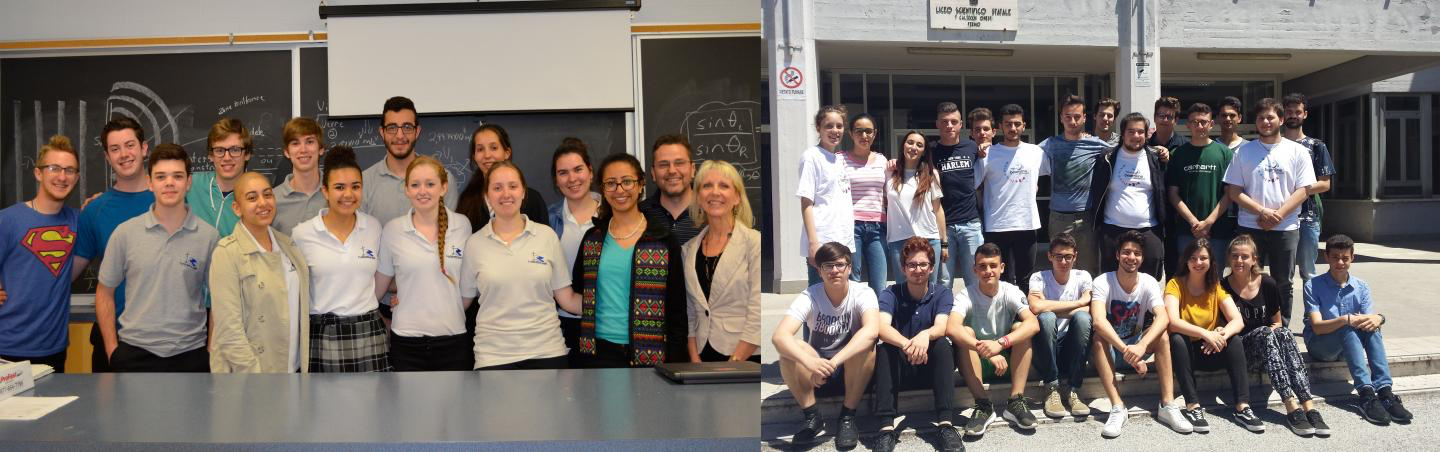
The " Charging Cavaliers" (on the left) and "TCO-ASA" (on the right).

The PRDG team, known as the "Charging Cavaliers," consisted of thirteen students (six boys and seven girls). Their project was the search for elementary particles with a fractional charge, by observing their light emission in the same type of liquid scintillator as that used in the SNO+ experiment at SNOLAB. With this proposal, they explored questions beyond the Standard Model of particle physics. The students dedicated over fifty hours to the project and submitted both a written proposal and a video. As winners, the team traveled to CERN in Geneva to conduct their experiment. This marked the first time a school from the Americas had won the competition, providing the students with a unique opportunity to work with a fully equipped CERN beamline and gain hands-on experience in experimental particle physics.

PDF: Written proposal and member bios

YouTube: Application Video

“I still can’t believe what happened. I feel incredibly privileged to be given this opportunity. It’s a once a lifetime opportunity It opens so many doors to a knowledge otherwise inaccessible to me. It represents the hard work our team has done. There’s just no words to describe it. Of course, I’m looking forward to putting our theory into practice in the hope of discovering fractionally charged particles, but most of all to expanding my knowledge of physics.” – Denisa Logojan from the Charging Cavaliers.

=== Visit to SNOLAB in Sudbury, ON (July 2017) ===
The same group of students from PRDG in Cambridge visited the underground facilities of SNOLAB on July 19, 2017. The visit followed the students’ first-place win in CERN’s international Beamline for Schools competition, where they proposed an experiment to study whether electric charge has a fundamental unit. The students were scheduled to travel to Switzerland to conduct their experiment at CERN.

=== Winners of Beamline for Schools speaking to PRDG students from Switzerland (September 2017) ===
In September 2017, the winning team of CERN’s international Beamline for Schools particle physics competition held a live discussion from Switzerland with students at their former school in Cambridge, Ontario. The team of thirteen students traveled to Geneva to conduct their experiment at CERN. Their research aims to investigate the possible existence of fractional electric charges smaller than those of electrons or protons, using high-energy particle beams, photomultiplier tubes, and scintillators, with support from SNOLAB and Laurentian University.

=== International Autonomous Robot Racing Challenge (July 2017) ===
The robotics team from PRDG, known as the Chevaliers de robotique, placed second at the International Autonomous Robot Racing Challenge (IARRC-17), held at the University of Waterloo on July 15, 2017. The team—composed of secondary school students—competed against seven university teams from Canada, the United States, India, and Thailand. They were recognized for their performance in the competition as well as for the quality of their technical report, video, and oral presentation, earning a $1,000 scholarship.

=== Coopétition de robotique ArcelorMittal (May 2018) ===
In May 2018, PRDG hosted the third edition of the ArcelorMittal Robotics “Coopetition,” bringing together more than 240 students from three French-language school boards in Central-Southern Ontario. The event featured multiple robotics challenges designed to develop students’ skills in engineering, problem-solving, teamwork, and innovation. Organized by the Conseil scolaire catholique MonAvenir, the competition included both regional and international-level challenges and concluded with an awards ceremony recognizing the top-performing teams.

=== Afro-Canadian Cultural Evening (March 2019) ===
In March 2019, PRDG hosted the first Afro-Canadian Cultural Evening, organized by the school in collaboration with the Association des francophones de Kitchener-Waterloo. Students from the multicultural club and student council helped run the event, which included workshops on traditional games, crafts, and hair styling, and concluded with a Akwaba performance featuring African drumming. The event celebrated Black Canadian history and culture, promoted community engagement, and recognized the contributions of Black Canadians to society.

=== Place à la Jeunesse Competition (November 2019) ===
In November 2019, three students from PRDG—Cyril Fayek, Patrick Ibrahim, and Simon Willemsma—placed third in the provincial Place à la Jeunesse entrepreneurship competition held at the University of Ottawa. The competition challenges students from French-language high schools across Ontario to develop innovative business solutions, analyze case studies, and present their proposals to a panel of judges. Each student received a $500 award, and the event provided opportunities for networking and professional development. The team was supported by teachers from PRDG and partner schools.

== School expansions ==
In January 2018, École secondaire catholique Père-René-de-Galinée in Cambridge, Ontario, received provincial funding to support the expansion of its facilities. The investment provided for the construction of eight new classrooms, allowing the school to accommodate an additional 178 students in response to growing enrolment. Representatives from the Conseil scolaire catholique MonAvenir, local school trustees, and government officials highlighted the school’s strong academic programs and its role in expanding access to French-language Catholic education in the Cambridge region.

== Sports ==
PRDG is a member of the eight-team District 8 Athletic Association, making their first CWOSSA and OFSAA appearance in the 2009-2010 school year for senior boys soccer. They made it to the quarterfinals in Windsor at OFSAA. Recently, the varsity girls soccer team made it all the way to bronze medal finalists at OFSAA in London Ontario(2023). In 2022, the senior boys volleyball team won CWOSSA, earning them a spot at OFSAA hosted in Caledon, where they made it to the OFSAA finals placing second. The team placed top 8 as well at OFSAA in 2023 in Sudbury. Other sports available at PRDG include hockey, soccer, basketball, cross country, track and field, golf, and tennis.

=== Olympic Youth Medalist (October 2018) ===
In October 2018, Emma Spence, a Grade 10 student at École secondaire catholique Père-René-de-Galinée in Cambridge, Ontario, won a bronze medal in the vault event in artistic gymnastics at the Youth Olympic Games with a combined score of 13.483. She also placed fifth on the balance beam and eighth in the floor exercise. Spence became the first Canadian gymnast to medal at the Youth Olympics and was selected as the flag bearer for Team Canada at the closing ceremony. Her achievements were celebrated by the school community, recognizing her athletic performance, perseverance, and contributions to promoting Olympic values.

Gymnast Emma Spence vaults to bronze at Youth Olympic Games (video by CBC)

=== SMASH Volleyball Tournament (May 2019) ===
In May 2019, PRDG hosted the SMASH volleyball tournament, bringing together over 550 students from approximately twenty French-language schools in Southwestern Ontario. The three-day event featured junior and senior boys’ and girls’ teams competing in friendly elimination rounds. Teams placing first in each category included ÉS Académie catholique Mère-Teresa (girls junior and senior), ÉSC Renaissance (boys junior), and ÉSC Monseigneur-Bruyère (boys senior). The tournament was organized with support from school staff, volunteers, and students, who also contributed to the event logo and website.

=== SMASH Volleyball Tournament Revival (May 2022) ===
In May 2022, PRDG resumed hosting the SMASH volleyball tournament, which had been on hiatus since 2019 due to the COVID-19 pandemic. The 42nd edition of the tournament brought together 600 students from French-language secondary schools across Southwestern Ontario, competing in 56 teams across four categories: junior and senior boys and girls. Established in 1981, the SMASH tournament celebrates French-language culture through athletic competition and provides opportunities for students to develop teamwork and sportsmanship.

== Charity work ==
Beyond academic achievement, PRDG is involved in charity work, locally known for its volunteer work. Students are encouraged to engage in social projects such as recycling and decreasing pollution.

== See also ==
- Education in Ontario
- List of secondary schools in Ontario
- PRDG Facebook
- PRDG Instagram
