= Eglinton East =

Coordinates: 43.740°N 79.246°W

- Neighbourhood
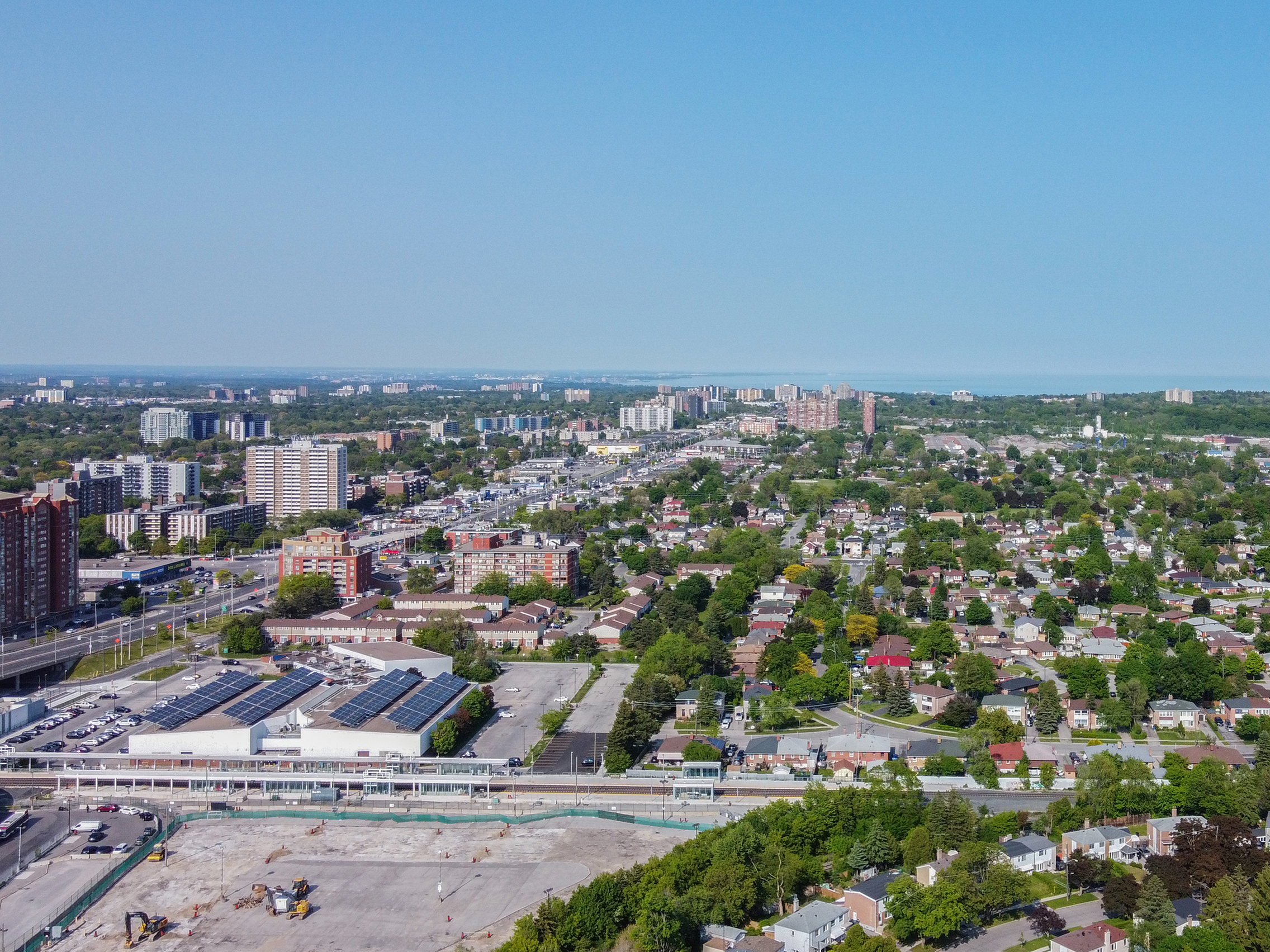
- Aerial view of Eglinton East in 2023

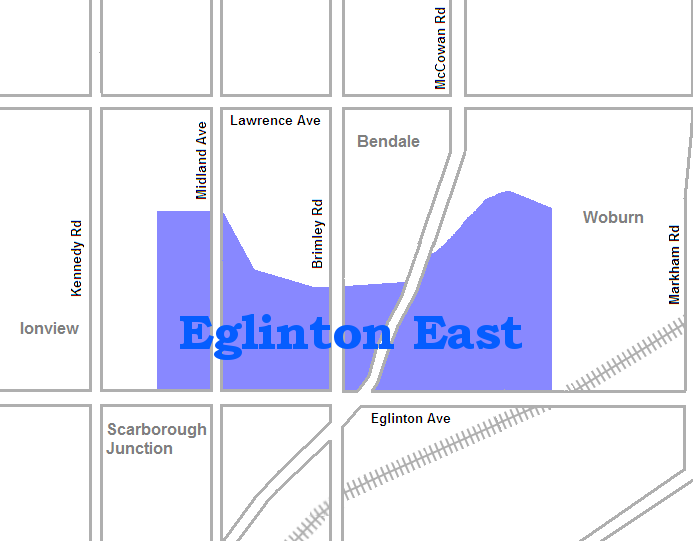
- Country: Canada
- Province: Ontario
- City: Toronto
- Established municipality: 1850 Scarborough Township
- Changed municipality: 1998 Toronto from City of Scarborough

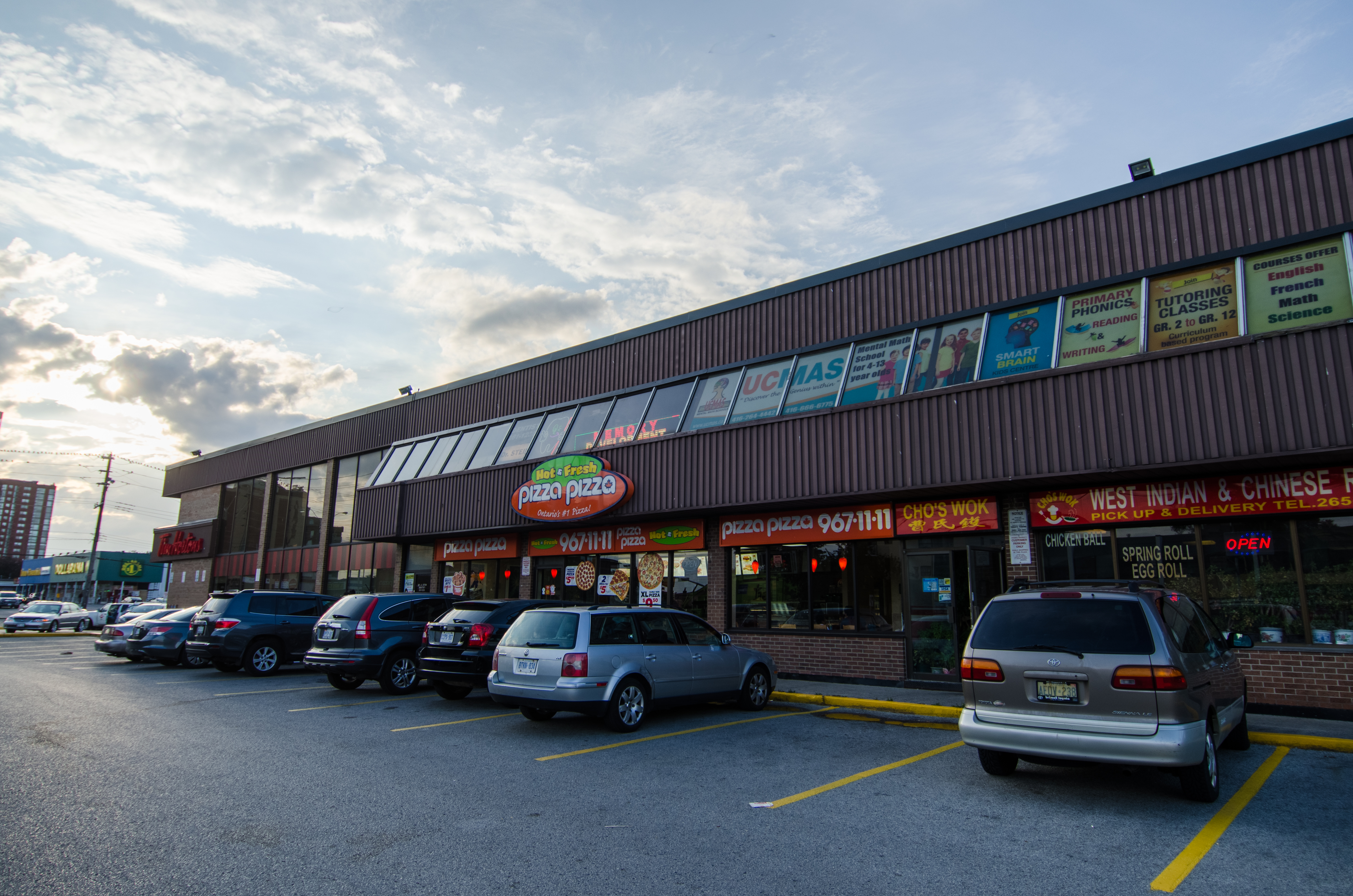
Storefronts on Eglinton and Midland Avenue

Eglinton East, historically known as Knob Hill, is a residential and commercial neighbourhood in Toronto, Ontario, Canada. It is bounded by Stansbury Crescent, Citadel Drive, and West Highland Creek to the north, Midland Avenue to the west, the CNR rail line, Brimley Road, and Eglinton Avenue to the south, and Bellamy Road North to the east.

Eglinton East is a working-class neighbourhood with a high percentage of immigration to the area. Sri Lanka has produced the most immigration to the area over the past decade, and correspondingly the most spoken (non-English) language is Tamil. There are many East Indian, Filipino and Jamaican people living in this neighbourhood. While there is an equal number of Chinese, the other figures are above average. Prior to the arrival, Macedonians and Bulgarians dominated the neighborhood, emigrating from Eastern Bloc countries after World War II.

The residents of this neighbourhood primarily live in high-rise buildings, with only 22% of people owning their place of residence.

== Education ==
Three public school boards operate schools in Eglinton East, the Conseil scolaire catholique MonAvenir (CSCM), Toronto Catholic District School Board (TCDSB), and the Toronto District School Board (TDSB). CSCM and TCDSB are separate public school boards, the former being French-based, whereas the latter is English-based. TDSB is a secular English-based public school board.

CSCM operates one secondary school in the neighbourhood, École secondaire catholique Père-Philippe-Lamarche. Established in 2017, the secondary school is located on 2850 Eglinton Avenue East.

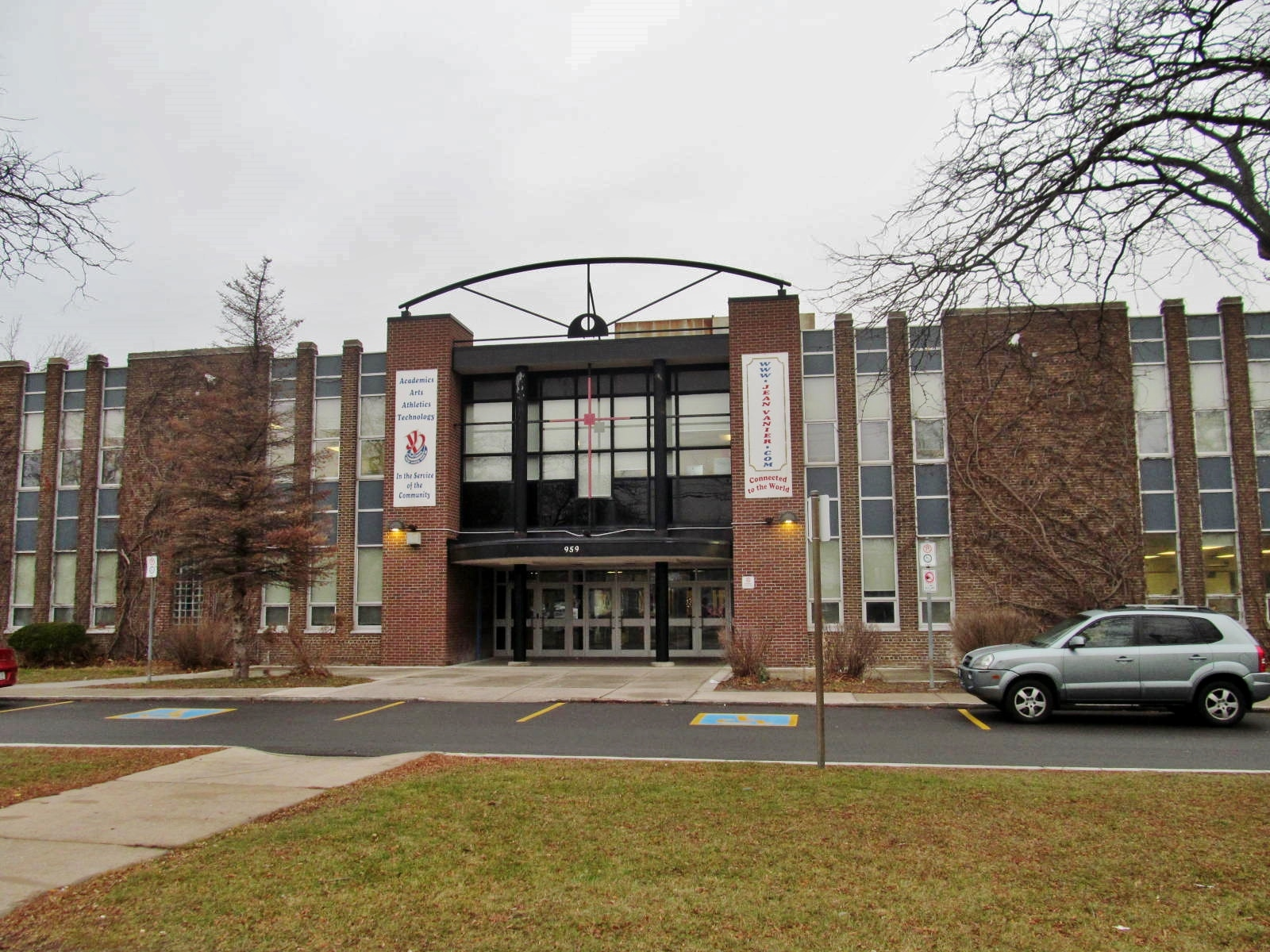
St. Joan of Arc Catholic Academy is a public separate secondary school located in Eglinton East.

TCDSB operates two schools in the neighbourhood, including one secondary school, St. Joan of Arc Catholic Academy (formerly Jean Vanier Catholic Secondary School). The secondary school was Central Scarborough's first Catholic secondary school, established to ease overcrowding at St. John Henry Newman Catholic High School, a TCDSB secondary school in the adjacent neighbourhood of Cliffcrest. The school was named after the son of Georges Vanier, Jean Vanier. The founder of the L'Arche communities worldwide. TCDSB also operates one elementary school, St. Nicholas Catholic School. St. Nicholas Catholic School is located on 33 Amarillo Drive. It was built in 1965 and was officially opened and blessed in 1966. The building was replaced with a new, modern three-storey school in 2013. St. Nicholas serves as the school's namesake.

TDSB operates three elementary schools in Eglinton East. Junior public schools (schools offering JK–6), Glen Ravine Junior Public School was opened in 1956, while Lord Roberts Junior Public School was opened in 1958. Lord Roberts was named after Frederick Roberts, 1st Earl Roberts. Both schools were originally opened as JK-8 schools, however they were reorganized into junior schools after the Charles Gordon Senior Public School, and Robert Service Senior Public School were opened in 1971.

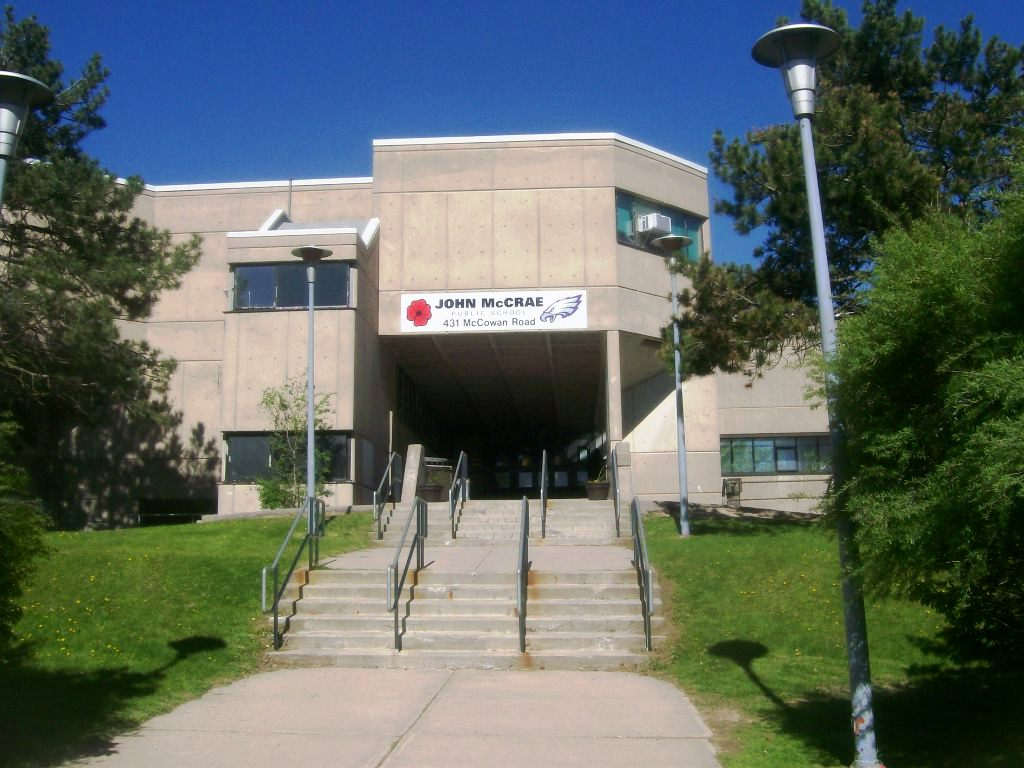
John McCrae Public School is one of several public elementary schools situated in the neighbourhood.

John McCrae Public School is a public school opened in 1959. The building was designed by Raymond Moriyama, while the school was named after John McCrae, the composer of the poem In Flanders Fields. The motto of the school, "The Torch - Be Yours to Hold It High," comes from said poem. McCrae became a JK-8 school in September 2011 following the closures of two feeder schools, McCowan Road Junior Public School (opened in 1954 as a JK-8 school; became JK-6) in 2011 and Pringdale Gardens Junior Public School (opened in 1963 as a JK-8 school; became JK-6) in 2013. The property for Pringdale was later sold, and the building demolished.

In addition to elementary schools, the Scarborough Board of Education (a predecessor of TDSB) operated one secondary school in the area, Tabor Park Vocational School. The secondary school was a former technical school built in 1964 and established on 7 September 1965 to meet the needs of the large baby boom generation in the newly and rapidly developing area of Scarborough. The school was closed in 1986, with the building re-purposed for the Scarborough Centre for Alternative Studies. The building was later transferred to the Metropolitan Separate School Board (now TCDSB) and has been used by Jean Vanier Catholic Secondary School since 1989.

In addition to public schools, the neighbourhood is also home to an Islamic private school, Wali ul asr East Campus. The school presently occupies the building formerly used as McCowan Road Junior Public School, leasing the property from the TDSB.

== Transportation ==
Public transportation is provided by two public services, the Toronto Transit Commission (TTC), and GO Transit. TTC provides local bus routes throughout then neighbourhood. Access to GO Transit commuter rail and bus services can be accessed from Eglinton GO Station, situated near the eastern boundary of the neighbourhood.
