= Woodland Christian High School =

Location
- 1058 Spitzig Road; Breslau, Ontario; Canada; 43°29′36″N 80°24′58″W

Information
- Type: Independent
- Established: 1976
- Category: High-school education
- Principal: Mr. John Van Pelt
- Teaching staff: 40+
- Grades: 9 - 12
- Colours: Blue and White
- Athletics: Basketball, Volleyball, Badminton, Soccer, Cross-Country, Track & Field, and Ultimate
- Mascot: Cavalier
- Nickname: CAVS
- Affiliations: Edvance Christian Schools
- Website: www.woodland.on.ca

Woodland Christian High School (WCHS) is an independent private Christian secondary school located in Breslau, Ontario, Canada. Founded in 1976 by a group of parents and churches in the Cambridge area, Woodland provides education from a distinctively Christian worldview. In the beginning, it operated from several church facilities throughout Cambridge and Kitchener–Waterloo. In 1979, the school moved onto its current location at 1058 Spitzig Road in Breslau. The facility has had multiple expansions and renovations which took place in 2002 and 2014, with the addition of a second building in 2026 known as the Woodland Ag & Tech Center.

Woodland is a non-denominational Christian school with students that attend a variety of Christian denominations both protestant and catholic. Woodland has an open enrolment and accepts students from all types of religions and beliefs.

Woodland draws students from a large geographic catchment area including Cambridge, Kitchener/Waterloo, Guelph, Listowel, Drayton and several surrounding areas such as Ayr, St. George, Rockwood, New Dundee, Palmerston, Harriston, Arthur, Elora, Fergus, Stratford, New Hamburg, Baden, and Wellesley.

== Arts Programs ==
Woodland offers Visual Arts, Music (Instrumental and Choral), and Drama to all students at the school. The school offers a wide range of music courses and extensive cocurricular opportunities for choir, band, worship teams, jazz band, and small group ensembles. Visual Arts and creativity are displayed throughout the school and extend to local art galleries and Chisel our published arts magazine.

Woodland hosts several concerts throughout the year including the annual Christmas concert and Celebration of Creative Arts in the spring. The school participates in various choral festivals and band competitions. The Woodland Concert Band received the 2017 Gold Award at Music Fest Canada in Niagara Falls.

== Athletics ==
Woodland's sports teams, the Cavaliers, compete in District 8 Athletic Association of the Central Western Ontario Secondary Schools Association, as well as the Ontario Christian Secondary Schools Athletic Association. Cavalier teams include girls' and boys' volleyball, basketball, soccer, badminton, cross-country, golf, track & field and ultimate.

Woodland has won several District 8 Championships in Volleyball, Basketball, Badminton, Soccer, and Ultimate and several individual medalling athletes in cross-country, badminton, and track & field. Woodland has a long list of OFSAA medals including most recently back to back Girls 'A" Basketball Championships (2024, 2025) and Gold in the both Boys and Girls (inaugural) 3x3 Basketball in 2026. These athletes have won the 2010, 2011, 2012, and 2013 OFSAA Sportsmanship Banners in Volleyball, Soccer, and Basketball.

Woodland also hold several championship banners in the Ontario Christian Secondary School Athletic Association (OCSSAA).

== International Students ==
Woodland Christian High School has an international student program that takes into consideration the needs and support of students from Southeast Asia, China, Korea, Taiwan, Europe, Africa, and South/Central America. International student enrollment at the school is limited to no more than 10% of the current student population, so that English Language Learners receive quality instruction and an immersive educational experience. ESL is taught at all levels, and there are several cultural experiences through the school's Multicultural Club.

== Affiliations ==
Woodland is a member of the Edvance Christian Schools and is inspected by the Ministry of Education of Ontario as an independent private school to grant graduating students with the Ontario Secondary School Diploma.

== See also ==
- Education in Ontario
- List of secondary schools in Ontario
