= St. Mary's High School (Kitchener) =

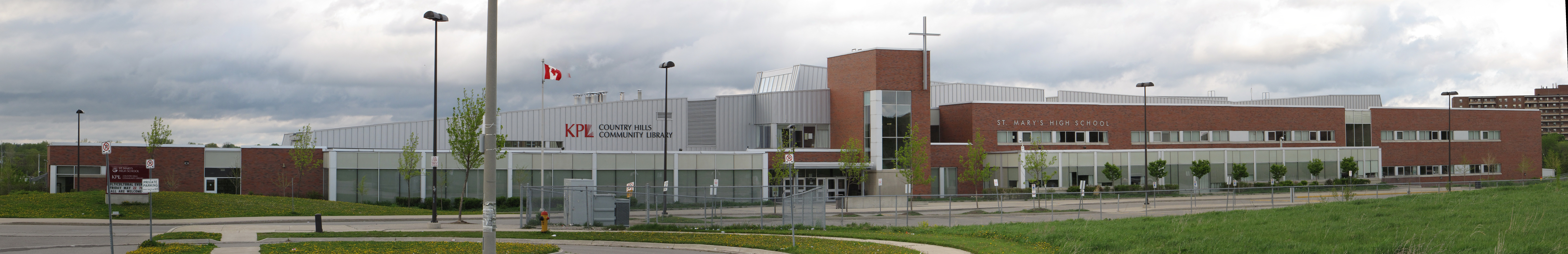

Location
- 1500 Block Line Road; Kitchener, Ontario, N2C 2S2; Canada; 43.420036°N 80.467431°W

Information
- School type: High School
- Motto: Virtus et Scientia (Virtue and Knowledge)
- Religious affiliation: Roman Catholic
- Founded: 1907
- School board: Waterloo Catholic District School Board
- Area trustee: Kathy Doherty-Masters, Winston Francis, Renee Kraft, and Tracey Weiler
- Principal: David Jaeger
- Grades: 9−12, 5th year or 7th year
- Enrollment: Approx. 2100
- Language: English (Main Language) / French, Spanish & Italian (Modern Language)
- Colours: White, Blue, and Navy Blue
- Mascot: Jerome the Eagle
- Team name: Eagles
- Website: stmary.wcdsb.ca

St. Mary's High School is a Catholic secondary school in Kitchener, Ontario, Canada. It serves most of Kitchener's Catholic students, with others attending Resurrection Catholic Secondary School. Members of its sports teams are known as the Eagles.

== History ==
The school was originally located in downtown Kitchener, where it was founded as the Girls' School to complement the adjacent boys-only St. Jerome's High School. As the latter school had older infrastructure, it was closed and St. Mary's was made co-ed in 1990. In 2002, the school moved from the downtown to the southern suburbs, where there would be far less commuting time for most students.

The former school buildings have been given differing fates: one auxiliary building (fka "West Wing" aka "Blue Wing") was demolished along with the gymnasium annex of the "West Campus" building; the main St. Jerome's facility has been renovated to house Wilfrid Laurier University's Faculty of Social Work, and the main St. Mary's building ("Green", "Yellow", and "Silver" wings) now houses both the Catholic School Board offices and the Kitchener Downtown Community Centre.

In the autumn of 2004, a new branch of the Kitchener Public Library opened within the new school building.

The school's fall 2005 enrollment was 2,200 students. This population was still far higher than the anticipated capacity; 25 portable classrooms are currently installed on the grounds, and no student parking is available due to the need for faculty parking, however, the newly constructed arena, the Activa Center, allows students use of its parking lot during school hours.

As of October 2008, the school's population was 2,123, making it one of the largest in Ontario.

The new school building features a Triple Gym, an auditorium/theatre known as Alumni Hall, as well as a large cafeteria. The school also houses tennis courts and 2 soccer/football fields.

In 2019, the school applied for an Aviva Community Fund that would allow for a facelift for their tennis courts and transform these courts into multi-purpose courts.

The school was granted $345,000 for facility improvements funded primarily by the Hallman Foundation which included developing their multi-purpose court, green gym, and park benches thanks to the work of The Legacy Committee.

Several notable events have occurred at the new school since its opening in 2002. These events include: a bomb scare in 2004, again in September 2010 and again in April 2016, a fire in the central stairwell in 2005, and a chemical scare in 2006. Also, in 2008, an E. coli scare emerged in the school's cafetorium, affecting several students. An anonymous caller made threats to students and staff resulting in a two-day closure on May 29 and 30, 2024.

In June 2011, the school received its first silver Certification in the WCDSB from Ontario Eco-School. with addition in June 2013 they arrive another silver Certification with Eco-School.

The school's motto Virtus et Scientia, meaning Virtue and Knowledge, has continued to be written in the lives of their graduates. As an extension to the school's classic motto, Virtus et Scientia, they have implemented their mission statement "Where Kindness Matters, Community Grows!".

The school uses its motto at the conclusion of its announcements and promotes a positive school community. As part of its emphasis on kindness, the school holds an annual Kindness Matters barbecue at the end of the school year. The event provides students with a shared lunch and includes games and other activities, with barbecue food and snacks provided to attendees.

In 2019, the Ion light rail system (LRT) brought passenger rail service to its newly constructed Block Line station, located one block from SMHS. This has allowed for easier and more convenient transportation for students.

== Athletics ==
In late spring 2007, the girl's slo-pitch team became WCSSA champions. They ended their season with 22 wins and 0 losses – a perfect season. They also competed in two tournaments in addition to the regular season, one in Toronto hosted by Bishop Allen and one in Kitchener at the Peter Hallman ballpark. They won both tournaments. Since then, they have gone 81-1-0 as of 2010.

In 2008/2009, the Activa Arena Complex, built by the city of Kitchener, was constructed beside the campus. The arena is now home to St. Mary's hockey teams, and it also houses the Lennox Lewis Boxing School.

In the spring of 2020, the COVID-19 pandemic resulted in the closure of schools, leading to the cancellation of all athletics in the District 8 Athletic Association. In the subsequent 2021-2022 school year athletics resumed.

Fall Sports:

- Basketball (Junior Girls, Senior Girls)
- Cross Country
- Field Hockey (Girls)
- Football (Junior Boys, Senior Boys)
- Golf (Junior Boys, Senior Boys, Girls)
- Soccer (Junior Boys)
- Tennis (Junior, Senior)
- Volleyball (Junior Boys, Senior Boys)

Winter Sports:

- Basketball (Novice Boys, Junior Boys, Senior Boys)
- Curling (Novice, Intermediate, Senior)
- Hockey (Junior Boys, Senior Boys, Girls)
- Powerlifting
- Swimming
- Volleyball (Novice Girls, Junior Girls, Senior Girls)
- Wrestling

Spring Sports:

- Badminton (Junior, Senior)
- Mud Puppy Chase (Special Education Students only)
- Rugby (Junior Boys, Senior Boys, Girls)
- Soccer (Senior Boys, Girls)
- Softball (Girls, Boys)
- Special Olympics (Special Education Students only)
- Track and Field
- Triathlon
- Ultimate Frisbee

St. Mary's is a member of the eight team District 8 Athletic Association.

== Performance arts ==
The campus' theatre, Alumni Hall, has been host to several theatrical productions. It is one of the only high schools in the Waterloo Region that produces two productions every year - one in the fall and one in the spring.

== Specialist High Skills Major ==
St. Mary's High School participates and encourages their grade 11 and 12 students to join their Specialist High Skills Major program (SHSM). This program allows for students to partake in numerous workshops that will earn valuable industry certifications and encourages focus on a career path matching their skills and interests.

St. Mary's specifically supports grade 11's and 12's who participate in this program by incorporating this into their co-operative education classes as a requirement and providing a Red Seal on their diploma if successfully completed. Students participating in SHSM are required to take courses specifically related to their Major such as - Arts, Business, Health and Wellness, Justice, Community Safety & Emergency Services, etc.

The school's co-operative education (Co-op) classes allow students to gain experience in many different trades and fields of work. St. Mary's Co-op class gives students the chance to see what it is like to work in a profession they are interested in and allows for students to develop helpful skills and earn hands-on experience.

== Staff and administration ==
The school’s principal is David Jaeger. The vice principals are Phil Lehmann, Anne Masojc, Kristy McDonnell, and Remberto Roque.

== Notable alumni ==
- Boyd Devereaux, NHL hockey player (Edmonton Oilers, Detroit Red Wings, Phoenix Coyotes, Toronto Maple Leafs)
- David Eby, leader of the British Columbia NDP since October 21, 2022, and the premier of British Columbia.
- David Edgar, soccer player
- Lisa LaFlamme, former chief news correspondent for CTV
- Don Maloney, NHL hockey player (New York Rangers, Hartford Whalers, New York Islanders), GM of Phoenix Coyotes
- Paul Reinhart, NHL hockey player (Calgary Flames)

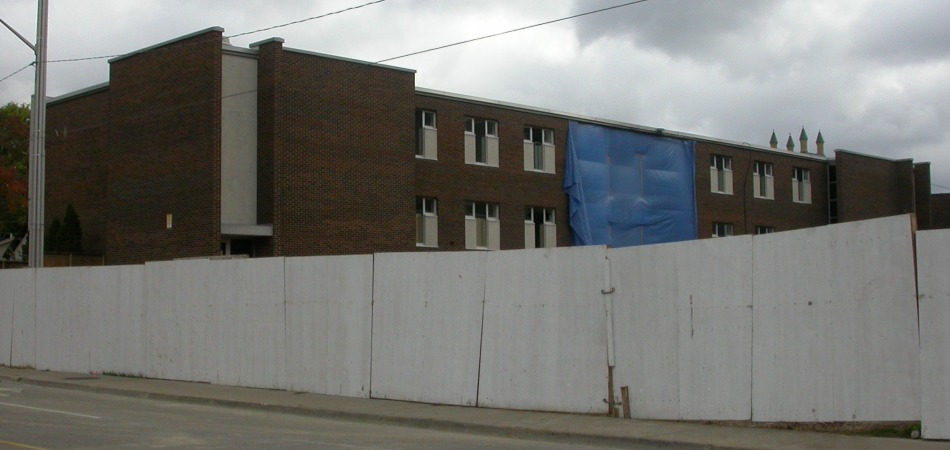
One of the former school buildings, "West Campus", being demolished.

== See also ==
- Education in Ontario
- List of secondary schools in Ontario
