= Conseil scolaire catholique MonAvenir =

Board of education

Coordinates: 43.786°N 79.423°W

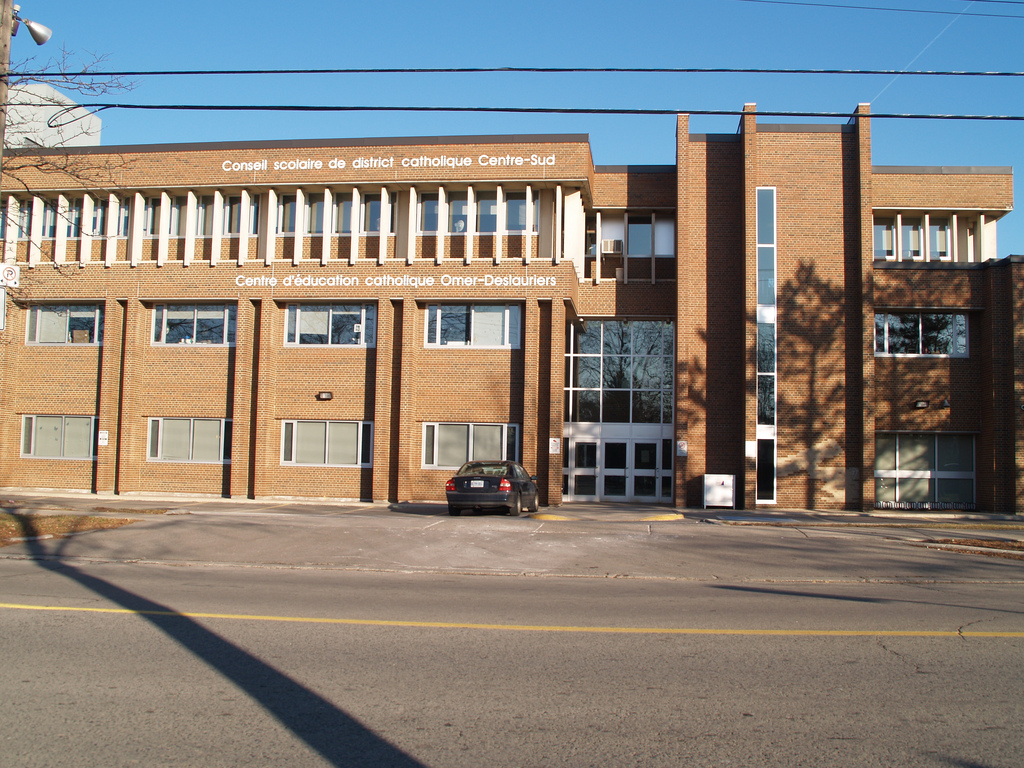
- Centre d'éducation catholique Omer-Deslauriers, head office for the school board

Location
- 110 Drewry Avenue; Toronto, Ontario, M2M 1C8 Southcentral Ontario Canada

District information
- Established: 1998
- Schools: 47 elementary schools 13 secondary schools 58 total (Note: Two schools of Conseil scolaire catholique MonAvenir provide both elementary, and secondary schooling)
- Budget: CA$150.1 million (2010-2011)

Students and staff
- Students: 13,600

Other information
- Chair of the board: Geneviève Grenier
- Director of education: Nicole Mollot
- Website: www.cscmonavenir.ca

Conseil scolaire catholique MonAvenir (lit. 'MyFuture Catholic School Board' (Note: Unofficial translation. French-language names are used in all communications, including English-language marketing.)), also referred to as CSC MonAvenir, is a French-language Catholic school board that manages elementary and secondary French schools in South-Central Ontario. The school board operates 47 elementary schools, 12 secondary schools, and two combined institutions within that area; in all major cities, including throughout the Greater Toronto Area. Conseil scolaire catholique MonAvenir is headquartered in the Centre d'éducation catholique Omer-Deslauriers (lit. 'Omer Deslauriers Centre of Catholic Education') in Toronto, Ontario, Canada.

The school board was formed in 1998 after several local school boards were amalgamated into the French-language Separate District School Board No. 64. From 1999 to 2017, the school board was known as the Conseil scolaire de district catholique Centre-Sud. The school board adopted its current name in 2017.

== Jurisdiction ==
Csc MonAvenir provides French-language school services to the following areas in Ontario:

- the cities of Toronto, Hamilton and Kawartha Lakes
- the regional municipalities of Durham, York, Peel, Halton, Niagara and Waterloo,
- the Counties of Brant, Dufferin, Haldimand, Norfolk, Northumberland, Peterborough, Simcoe and Wellington,
- the District Municipality of Muskoka, and
- in the District of Parry Sound, the Town of Parry Sound and the Townships of Carling, McDougall, McKellar and Seguin.

== History ==
The school board's logo, before it changed its name to MonAvenir in 2017

The school board was formed as the French-language Separate District School Board No. 64 in 1998, as a part of the province-wide restructuring of Ontario's school boards resulting from the Fewer School Boards Act, 1997, The new school board assumed control over public French-language separate school previously managed by other school boards in the Greater Golden Horseshoe. French separate school boards and departments that were amalgamated into the new school board includes the Conseil des écoles catholiques du Grand Toronto, the French language unit the Metropolitan Separate School Board (reorganized into the Toronto Catholic District School Board after the enactment of the Fewer School Boards Act).

In 1999, the school board was renamed to Conseil scolaire de district catholique Centre-Sud. In May 2017, it was renamed to the Conseil scolaire catholique MonAvenir.

== Schools ==
The board's schools cover the Greater Golden Horseshoe area of Ontario. The school board operates 46 elementary schools, 11 secondary schools, and two schools that provides both elementary and secondary levels of education.

City/region/county	Pre-1998 school boards	Elementary schools	Secondary schools
City of Hamilton	Le conseil des écoles séparées catholiques romaines de Hamilton-Wentworth	École élémentaire catholique Monseigneur-de-Laval; École élémentaire catholique Notre-Dame	École secondaire Académie catholique Mère-Teresa
City of Peterborough	Peterborough, Victoria, Northumberland & Clarington Roman Catholic Separate School Board	École catholique Monseigneur-Jamot (Note: The school operates as both an elementary and secondary school.)	École catholique Monseigneur-Jamot
City of Toronto	Conseil des écoles catholiques du Grand Toronto	École élémentaire catholique du Bon-Berger; École élémentaire catholique Georges-Étienne-Cartier; École élémentaire catholique du Sacré-Coeur; École élémentaire catholique Notre-Dame-de-Grâce; École élémentaire catholique Saint-Jean-de-Lalande; École élémentaire catholique Saint-Michel; École élémentaire catholique Saint-Noël-Chabanel; École élémentaire catholique Sainte-Madeleine; École élémentaire catholique Sainte-Marguerite-d'Youville	École secondaire catholique Saint-Frère-André; École secondaire catholique Monseigneur-de-Charbonnel; École secondaire catholique Père-Philippe-Lamarche
County of Brant	Le conseil des écoles séparées catholiques du comté de Brant	École élémentaire catholique Sainte-Marguerite-Bourgeoys, Brantford	
County of Norfolk	Le conseil des écoles séparées catholiques de Haldimand-Norfolk	École élémentaire catholique Sainte-Marie, Simcoe	
County of Simcoe	Simcoe County Roman Catholic Separate School Board	École élémentaire catholique Frère-André, Barrie; École élémentaire catholique Marguerite-Bourgeois, Borden; École élémentaire catholique Saint-Louis, Penetanguishene; École élémentaire catholique Sainte-Croix, Lafontaine; École élémentaire catholique Notre-Dame-de-la-Huronie, Collingwood; École élémentaire catholique Samuel-de-Champlain, Orillia	École secondaire catholique Nouvelle-Alliance, Barrie
Regional Municipality of Durham	Conseil des écoles séparées catholiques de la région de Durham	École élémentaire catholique Corpus-Christi, Oshawa; École élémentaire catholique Notre-Dame-de-la-Jeunesse, Ajax; École élémentaire catholique Jean-Paul II, Whitby	École secondaire catholique Saint-Charles-Garnier, Whitby
Regional Municipality of Halton	Conseil des écoles catholiques de Halton	École élémentaire catholique du Sacré-Coeur, Halton Hills; École élémentaire catholique Saint-Philippe, Burlington; École élémentaire catholique Sainte-Marie, Oakville; École élémentaire catholique Saint-Nicolas, Milton; École élémentaire catholique Sainte Anne, Milton	École secondaire catholique Sainte-Trinité, Oakville
Regional Municipality of Niagara	Le conseil des écoles catholiques du comté de Lincoln; Le conseil scolaire des écoles catholiques romaines du comté de Welland	École élémentaire catholique Immaculée-Conception, St. Catharines; École élémentaire catholique Notre-Dame-de-la-Jeunesse, Niagara Falls; École élémentaire catholique du Sacré-Coeur, Welland; École élémentaire catholique Saint-Antoine, Niagara Falls; École élémentaire catholique Saint-François-d'Assise, Welland; École élémentaire catholique Saint-Joseph, Port Colborne; École élémentaire catholique Sainte-Marguerite-Bourgeoys, St. Catharines	École secondaire catholique Saint-Jean Brebeuf, Welland
Regional Municipality of Peel	Conseil des écoles séparées catholiques de Dufferin & Peel	École élémentaire catholique Ange-Gabriel, Mississauga; École élémentaire catholique René-Lamoureux, Mississauga; École élémentaire catholique Saint-Jean-Baptiste, Mississauga; École élémentaire catholique Saint-Jean-Bosco, Caledon; École élémentaire catholique Sainte-Jeanne-d'Arc, Brampton	École secondaire catholique Sainte-Famille, Mississauga
Regional Municipality of Waterloo	Le conseil des écoles séparées catholiques de la région de Waterloo	École élémentaire catholique Cardinal-Léger, Kitchener; École élémentaire catholique Mère-Elisabeth-Bruyère, Waterloo; École élémentaire catholique Saint-Noël-Chabanel, Cambridge	École secondaire catholique Père-René-de-Galinée, Cambridge
Regional Municipality of York	Conseil des écoles séparées catholiques de la région de York	École catholique Pape-François, Stouffville; École élémentaire catholique Jean-Béliveau, East Gwillimbury; École élémentaire catholique Le-Petit-Prince, Vaughan; École élémentaire catholique Saint-Jean, Aurora; École élémentaire catholique Sainte-Marguerite-Bourgeoys, Markham	École catholique Pape-François, Stouffville; École secondaire catholique Renaissance, Aurora; École secondaire catholique de l'Ascension Vaughan
Wellington County	Conseil des écoles séparées catholiques de Wellington	École élémentaire catholique Saint-René-Goupil, Guelph	

== See also ==
- List of school districts in Ontario
- List of high schools in Ontario
- Conseil scolaire Viamonde
