= Resurrection Catholic Secondary School =

Location
- 455 University Ave. West; Kitchener, Ontario, N2N 3B9; Canada; 43.44088°N 80.54672°W

Information
- School type: Secondary
- Motto: "Learning, Growing, Building. Making a Difference."
- Religious affiliation: Roman Catholic
- Founded: 1990
- School board: Waterloo Catholic District School Board
- Principal: Deanna Wehrle
- Grades: 9–12
- Enrollment: 1800
- Language: English
- Colours: Red and Gold
- Mascot: Peep and Peepette
- Team name: Phoenix
- Website: resurrection.wcdsb.ca

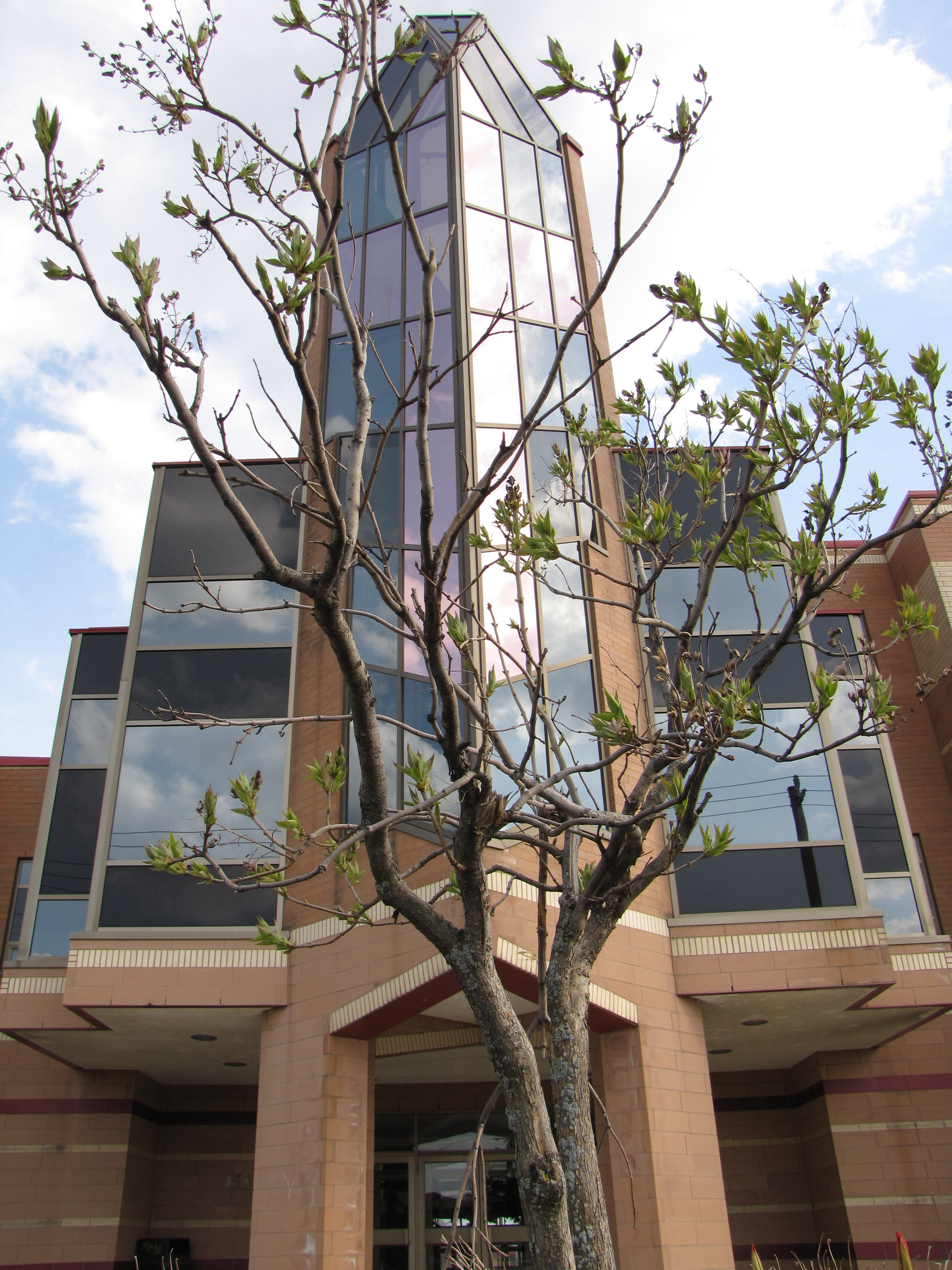

Resurrection Catholic Secondary School is a Catholic high school in Kitchener, Waterloo Region, Ontario, Canada.

== Athletics ==
Resurrection has its athletics program, which has recently seen the following teams achieve success at the local and/or provincial levels:

- 2008 OFSAA Western Bowl Champions - Senior Boys football
- 2008 CWOSSA Champions - Senior Boys football
- 2008 WCSSAA Champions - Senior Boys football
- 2009 WCSSAA Champions - Senior Boys football
- 2009 CWOSSA AAAA Champions - Junior Boys Basketball
- 2010 CWOSSA AAAA Champions - Junior Boys Basketball
- 2010 CWOSSA AAAA Champions - Junior Girls Volleyball
- 2010 CWOSSA Champions - Girls Field Hockey
- 2010 OFSAA Gold Medalists - Girls Field Hockey
- 2011 CWOSSA Finalist - Girls Field Hockey
- 2011 OFSAA Gold Medalists - Girls Field Hockey
- 2012 CWOSSA Champions - Girls Field Hockey
- 2012 OFSAA Gold Medalists - Girls Field Hockey
- 2013 OFSAA Silver Medalists - Girls Field Hockey
- 2014 WCSSAA Champions - Jr. Boys Football
- 2015 D8 Champions - Jr. Boys Football
- 2015 D8/CWOSSA Champions - Sr Boys Football
- 2015 OFSAA Metro Bowl Championships - Sr Boys Football
- 2016 D8 Champions - Jr. Boys Football
- 2017 D8 Champions - Jr. Boys Football
- 2018 D8 Champions - Jr. Boys Football
- 2018 D8 Champions - Sr. Boys Football
- 2019 D8 Champions - Jr. Boys Football
- 2022 D8 Champions - Jr. Boys Football
- 2022 D8/CWOSSA Champions - Sr Boys Football
- 2022 OFSAA Metro Bowl Champions - Sr Boys football
- 2023 D8 Champions - Jr. Boys Football
- 2023 D8 Champions - Sr. Boys Football
- 2024 D8 Champions - Sr. Boys Football

Resurrection has introduced the PEAT athletics program, which is an enrichment program for self-motivated student-athletes who demonstrate exceptional athletic potential in a given sport. The PEAT program will focus on developing transferable skills including speed, agility, endurance, power, and flexibility.

Resurrection is a member of the eight team District 8 Athletic Association.

== Academics ==
During the course of the 2011-2012 school year, Resurrection's Reach for the Top team won the regional tournament for Waterloo, and therefore ended up attending the Provincial championships, where the team placed 13th in the Province.

Resurrection Catholic Secondary School offers a University Cooperative Education Program (UCEP), where students in either grade 12 or 13 spend their first semester at the University of Waterloo, Wilfrid Laurier University or St. Jerome's University. The student is then able to gain a co-op position with a professor on any of these campuses.

The Waterloo Catholic Secondary School Board offers a program known as High Skills Major. In this program, the student will receive a number of certifications and will be able to attend courses related to a specific career path such as health and wellness. The student will also take certain courses in their upper years (grade 11 and 12) relating to this career path. For example, in health and wellness a student would have to take some science courses. It is also a necessity to take co-op, and to receive a placement in the career of the student's choice. Once all these requirements are met, students who participated in the program will receive a designation on their diploma.

== Student Council ==
The school has a student council, with two presidents elected by students and a cabinet of ministers with responsibility for different areas of the council.

== Staff and administration ==
The school’s principal is Deanna Wehrle. The vice principals are Kevin Hinsperger, E.J. Hunt, and Erin Riley.

== Notable alumni ==
- Sarah Manninen (1995) - actress
- Andrew Pickett (2014) - CFL, Ottawa Redblacks
- Kyle Platzer (2013) - OHL, London Knights, Owen Sound Attack, NHL draft.

== See also ==
- Education in Ontario
- List of secondary schools in Ontario
