= Monsignor Doyle Catholic Secondary School =

Coordinates: 43.3409°N 80.2978°W

Monsignor E. A. Doyle Catholic Secondary School
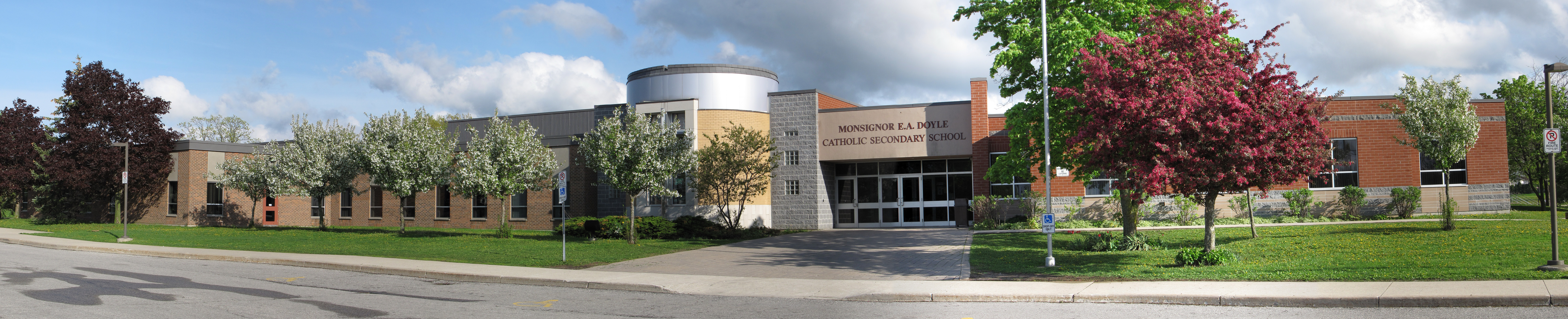

Location
- 185 Myers Road; Cambridge, Ontario, N1R 7H2 CAMBRIDGE; Canada

Information
- School type: Public, Separate
- Motto: We walk the path of learning, faith, and respect together.
- Religious affiliation: Roman Catholic
- Founded: 1976
- School board: Waterloo Catholic District School Board
- Principal: Rich Stelhik
- Grades: 9-12
- Enrollment: ~1000 (September 2015)
- Language: English
- Campus: Suburban South Galt
- Area: St. Ambrose Parish, Cambridge
- Colours: Maroon and Gold
- Mascot: Morris the Mustang
- Team name: Mustangs
- Feeder schools: Holy Spirit Elementary School; St. Francis Elementary School; St. Vincent de Paul Elementary School; St. Augustine Elementary School; St. Brigid Elementary School; St. Anne Elementary School; St. Patrick Elementary School (formerly); St. Ambrose Elementary School (formerly)
- Website: doyle.wcdsb.ca

Monsignor Doyle Catholic Secondary School is a public, Catholic High School in Cambridge, Ontario, Canada which opened in 1976 as a junior high school, and is the second smallest Catholic secondary school of the Waterloo Catholic District School Board. In the mid-1980s, Catholic education received full funding and all Catholic junior high schools in Waterloo Region converted to high schools teaching grades 9 - 12 and OAC.

In 2006, the school received an addition to the back of the school, adding fourteen classrooms and a second story, which removed the 12 portables previously littering the area. The school's student council has worked towards pushing for a uniform-free week in the past, as well as a second semi-formal, believing it to improve school spirit. In mid-2007 the school saw a lockdown which lasted 2 hours. It is home to a generally large European (Portuguese) and Newfoundlander population, and is one of the two Catholic High Schools in Cambridge, drawing students from most of South Galt. Monsignor Doyle is a member of the eight team District 8 Athletic Association.

Monsignor Doyle administration, staff, and students have worked together to create what they describe as a "safe and respectful education culture that is inclusive of all people". After the Waterloo Catholic District School Board approved the flying of the Pride flag in 2021, Monsignor Doyle raised its Pride flag for the first time on June 1, 2021. They have continued to do so each June since to mark the celebration of pride month.

== Staff and administration ==
The school’s principal is Rich Stehlik. The vice principals are Tracey Hewerdine and Garry Kraehling.

== See also ==
- Education in Ontario
- List of secondary schools in Ontario
