= Kitchener Public Library =

Public library system in Ontario, Canada

Coordinates: 43.4527°N 80.4861°W

- Central Library in downtown Kitchener
- Location: 85 Queen Street North, Kitchener, Ontario N2H 2H1
- Established: 1884
- Branches: 6

Collection
- Items collected: business directories, phone books, maps, government publications, books, periodicals, genealogy, local history,
- Size: 580,000 books 5,000 audiovisuals 107,000 square feet

Access and use
- Circulation: 2,000,000
- Population served: 200,000; 1,000,000 (annual visits); 600,000 (annual web visits)

Other information
- Budget: $9.2m
- Director: Darren Solomon
- Website: www.kpl.org

The Kitchener Public Library is the public library system for the city of Kitchener, Ontario, Canada. It consists of six libraries; a large Central Library in the downtown core, with five Community Libraries located in various neighbourhoods of Kitchener. Library staff are represented by the Canadian Union of Public Employees.

== History ==
The main branch of the Kitchener Public Library opened at 85 Queen Street in May 1962. Its origins date to the Mechanics Institute first established in 1854, an institution that within the first year grew to house nearly 1,000 books in German and English. It was a Carnegie library. The collection, maintained by membership fees and private subscriptions, was destroyed by fire in the 1860s and was replaced in 1871 by a library located on the first floor of the town hall. The Berlin Public Library was officially formed in 1884 following the passing of the Free Libraries Act two years prior.

The present library replaced the Berlin Public Library which originally opened in 1884 with a collection of 2,855 volumes on the first floor of the town hall. The Berlin Public Library moved when it became a Carnegie library, opening on January 8, 1904, located at Queen and Weber. Mabel Dunham served as Chief Librarian at the new location from 1908 to 1944. The Carnegie library was demolished following the opening of the Queen Street location in 1962.

In 2010, the main branch underwent a $40 million 25,000-square-foot expansion. Completed in 2013, the project increased floor space by 30% (from around 82,000 square feet to 107,000 square feet). The expansion also made the entire building wheelchair accessible. Designed by Levitt Goodman Architects, the building was awarded a 2015 Library Architectural and Design Transformation award by the Ontario Library Association.

In 2015, the Kitchener Public Library became the first library in Canada to lend out internet hotspots. Since 2017, musical instruments have been available for loan. The initial program launch was supported by an 150 instrument donation from Sun Life Financial. Since 2019, the library has provided free menstrual hygiene products. In 2021, the library eliminated fines for overdue materials. In 2025, the Southwest branch of the library opened a teaching kitchen and started a program to teach children culinary skills.

== Branches ==
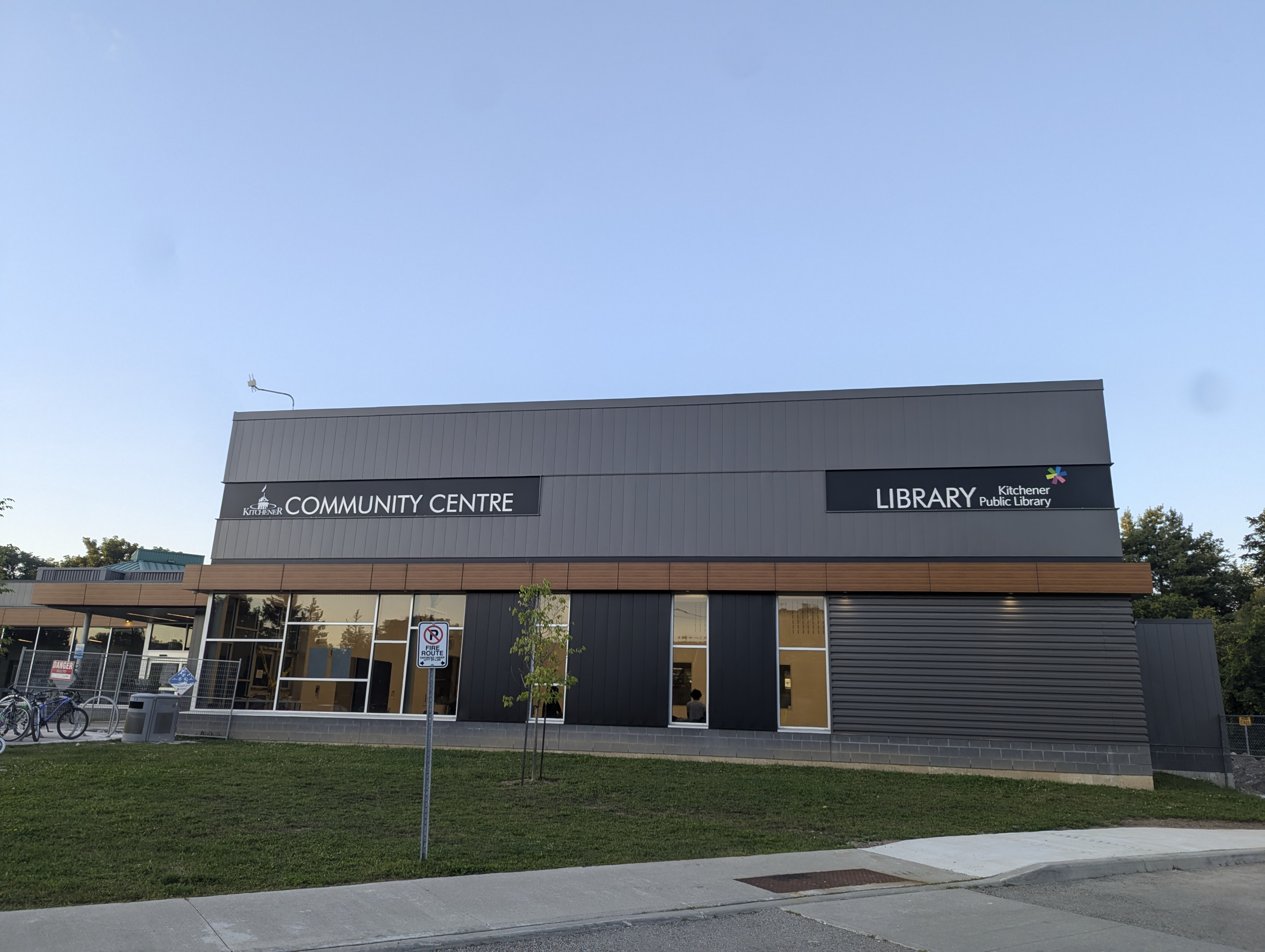
Pioneer Park Library

The Kitchener Public Library system consists of a Central Library in the downtown core, and five Community Library locations throughout the city. The Central Library was completely renovated and expanded in 2014.

| Branch | Founded | Present building opened | Attached public facility |
|---|---|---|---|
| Central | 1884 | 1962 (expansion opened 2014) | Standalone |
| Grand River Stanley Park | 1971 | 2002 | Grand River Collegiate Institute |
| Forest Heights | 1976 | 1976 | Forest Heights Community Pool; Forest Heights Collegiate Institute |
| Pioneer Park | 1982 | 1989 | Doon-Pioneer Park Community Centre |
| Country Hills | 2004 | 2004 | St. Mary's High School |
| Southwest | 2025 | 2025 | Standalone |

== See also ==
- Media related to Kitchener Public Library at Wikimedia Commons
- Ask Ontario
- List of public libraries in Ontario
- List of Carnegie libraries in Canada
