= Drewry Secondary School =

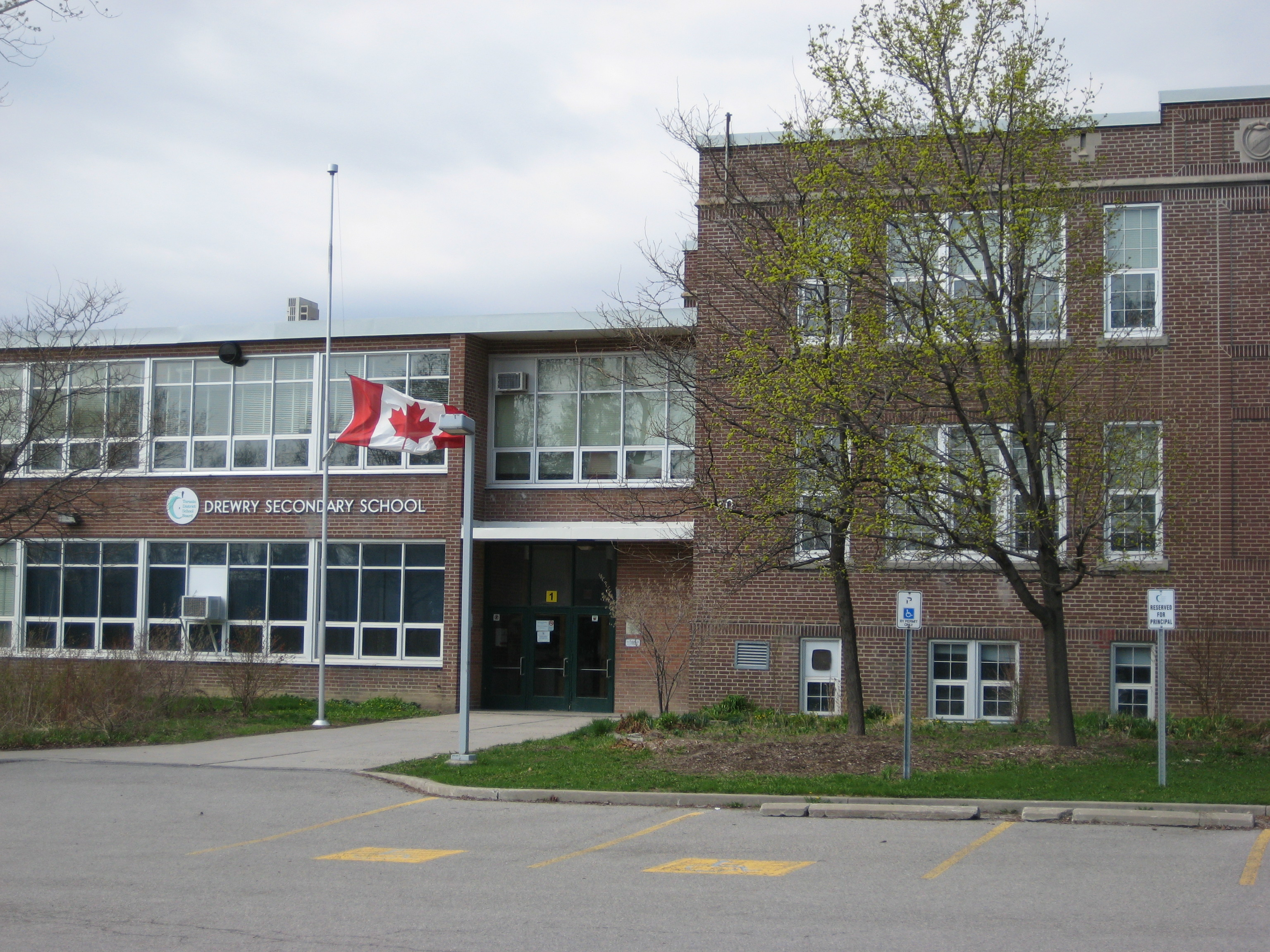

Location
- 70 Drewry Avenue; Toronto, Ontario, M2M 1C8; Canada; 43.7869°N 79.4210°W

Information
- Former name: Lewis S. Beattie Secondary School (1966-1989)
- School type: Public High school Vocational High school
- Motto: Respect Yourself, Respect Others, Take Responsibility.
- Founded: 1966
- School board: Toronto District School Board (North York Board of Education)
- Superintendent: Domenic Giorgi
- Area trustee: Weidong Pei
- School number: 3512 / 922706
- Principal: Jinah Park
- Grades: 9–12
- Enrolment: 127 (2013–14)
- Language: English
- Mascot: Dragon
- Team name: Drewry Dragons
- Public transit access: TTC: North/South: 98 Willowdale-Senlac; West/East: 125 Drewry; Rapid Transit: Finch, Sheppard-Yonge
- Website: www.tdsb.on.ca/MOSS/asp_apps/school_landing_page/pdfs/web/3512_4pageLayout.pdf

Drewry Secondary School, formerly known as Lewis S. Beattie Vocational School and Lewis S. Beattie Secondary School is a small specialized vocational secondary school in Toronto, Ontario, Canada. It is located in the Newtonbrook neighborhood of the former suburb of North York. It was operated by the North York Board of Education until its merger into the Toronto District School Board. Since 1989, the school is housed in the former elementary school building.

== History ==
The original school was established in 1966 for the North York Board of Education as Lewis S. Beattie at 110 Drewry Avenue and in 1989, the school moved to the former Drewry Elementary School with the former site becoming École secondaire catholique Monseigneur-de-Charbonnel. The school was originally named for Lewis Stanley Beattie, superintendent of secondary education for the province of Ontario.

== See also ==
- Education in Ontario
- List of secondary schools in Ontario
