= École secondaire catholique Sainte-Famille =

Location
- 1780 Meadowvale Boulevard; Mississauga, Ontario, L5N 7K8; Canada; 43.61417°N 79.74666°W

Information
- Motto: Croire et Grandir (Believe and Grow)
- Religious affiliation: Catholic
- Founded: 1989
- School board: Conseil scolaire catholique MonAvenir
- Principal: Roger Lebel
- Grades: 7–12
- Language: French
- Team name: Les Couguars
- Website: essf.cscmonavenir.ca

École secondaire catholique Sainte-Famille (ESC Sainte-Famile or Sainte-Famile), known in English as Holy Family Catholic Secondary School is a French language Catholic high school located in Mississauga, Ontario, Canada managed by the Conseil scolaire Catholique MonAvenir. Before 1998, the school was part of the Dufferin-Peel Separate School Board (Conseil des écoles séparées catholiques de Dufferin & Peel) as the board's sole French secondary school.

The school offers the International Baccalaureate.

== See also ==
- Education in Ontario
- List of secondary schools in Ontario
