= École secondaire catholique Monseigneur-de-Charbonnel =

École secondaire catholique Monseigneur-de-Charbonnel (Monsignor Charbonnel Catholic Secondary School)
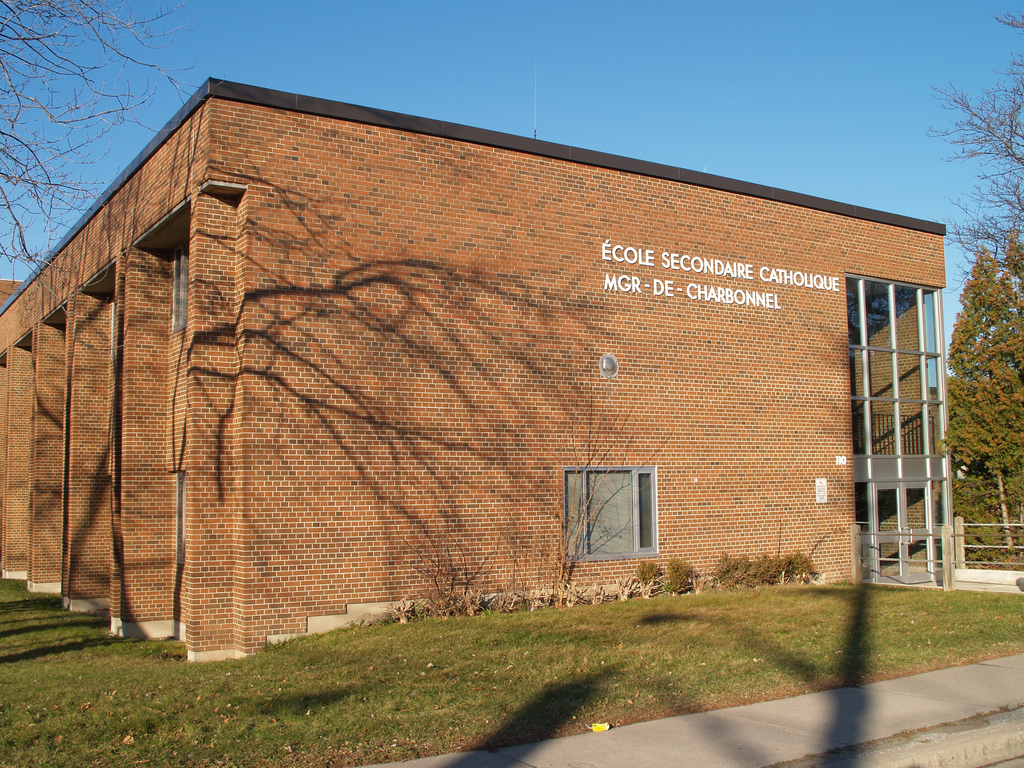

Location
- 110 Drewry Avenue; North York, Toronto, Ontario, M2M 1C8; Canada; 43.786°N 79.423°W

Information
- School type: Bill 30 Catholic High school Bill 30 Catholic Elementary school
- Motto: Nos boom deducere
- Religious affiliations: Roman Catholic (Congregation of Notre Dame)
- Founded: 1985
- School board: Conseil scolaire catholique MonAvenir (Le Conseil des écoles catholiques du Grand Toronto)
- Superintendent: Sebastian Hicks
- Area trustee: North Toronto; Ian Park; South Toronto; Johnny Peter Augustin; Ward 5
- School number: 537 / 733458; 537 / 705128
- Principal: Eddy Wambo
- Grades: 6–7
- Enrolment: 350 (2024)
- Language: Fraçais
- Colours: Maroon and White
- Public transit access: TTC: North/South: 98 Willowdale-Senlac; West/East: 125 Drewry; Rapid Transit: Finch, Sheppard-Yonge
- Website: esmdc.cscmonavenir.ca

École secondaire catholique Monseigneur-de-Charbonnel (occasionally called ESC MDC, ESC Charbonnel, or Charbonnel); known in English as Monseigneur Charbonnel Catholic Secondary School is a French-language Catholic elementary and high school operated by the Conseil scolaire catholique MonAvenir in the North York district of Toronto, Ontario, Canada.

It was part of Le Conseil des écoles catholiques du Grand Toronto (the Metropolitan Separate School Board) as the only French secondary school until 1998 when the board became the Toronto Catholic District School Board and its schools for francophones were transferred to the Conseil scolaire de district catholique Centre-Sud.

Located at the North York Board of Education's former Lewis S. Beattie Secondary School, the school is attached by the offices of CSDCCS. The school was named after Armand-François-Marie de Charbonnel, who was the Roman Catholic Bishop of Toronto from 1847 to 1860. Its motto is "Nos boom deducere".

== History ==
The origins of the school can be traced to 1952 when the Congregation of Notre Dame opened its doors on 157 St. Georges Street, formerly owned by the Eaton family, as Villa Marguerite Bourgeoys, the first bilingual Roman Catholic high school. The school was renamed to École secondaire de Charbonnel in 1963. The property was eventually sold to University of Toronto's Delta Kappa Epsilon fraternity in 1964. and the Charbonnel high school closed its doors in June 1967. In April 1969, two trustees of the Metropolitan Toronto School Board (MTSB) attempted to stop the opening of the school in the fall of that year. At that time the board was expected to approve a plan that would lease the existing high school, which was owned by the Congregation. The district expected that 12 teachers and 235 students would be a part of the school and that there would be an annual operation cost of $225,000.

In September 1985, the modern school, École secondaire catholique Monseigneur-de-Charbonnel was opened by the Conseil des écoles catholiques du Grand Toronto (CECGT), the French unit of the Metropolitan Separate School Board (MSSB), with 66 students on the St. Robert Elementary property. In 1989, with 221 students enrolled, Charbonnel moved to the former Lewis S. Beattie Secondary School when the North York Board of Education had moved their students to Drewry Secondary School as the Beattie school was given to the CECGT/MSSB. Beattie was handed over around in May of 1988 as parents protested the handover. One member of the Metro School Board negotiation team, John Fillon, stated that if the North York board did not release Lewis S. Beattie, an arbitrator may have ruled to give away more schools as well as Beattie.

There were plans in April 1988 to have 200 separate school students and a group of secular public schools slow learners share the Beattie campus for a two-year period until the new Mary Ward Catholic Secondary School building in Scarborough that was opened in 1992. Opponents stated concerns that the separate students would ridicule the secular students. Beattie served as the only school for special students in North York, and had around 200 students from North York and Scarborough. It mainly included students with mental and physical disabilities and slow learners.

In 1997, Sebastian Hicks, initially a teacher for secondary catholic school Père-Philipe-Lamarche (PPL) was hired as superintendent for the school. He is officially the longest lasting superintendent in the school's history lasting 29 years as of 2025.

In 1998, the MSSB was reorganized into the new Toronto Catholic District School Board (TCDSB) where it now solely operates anglohone schools and the francophone schools in the former CECGT (including Charbonnel) were subsumed into the newly established Conseil scolaire de district catholique Centre-Sud (CSDCCS). It was the only francophone high school in the City of Toronto until École secondaire catholique Saint-Frère-André opened in 2012.

== Notable alumni ==
- Dan Harris, Canadian politician

== See also ==
- Education in Ontario
- List of secondary schools in Ontario
- Lewis S. Beattie Secondary School
