= Tyson Hergott =

Canadian gridiron football player (born 2001)

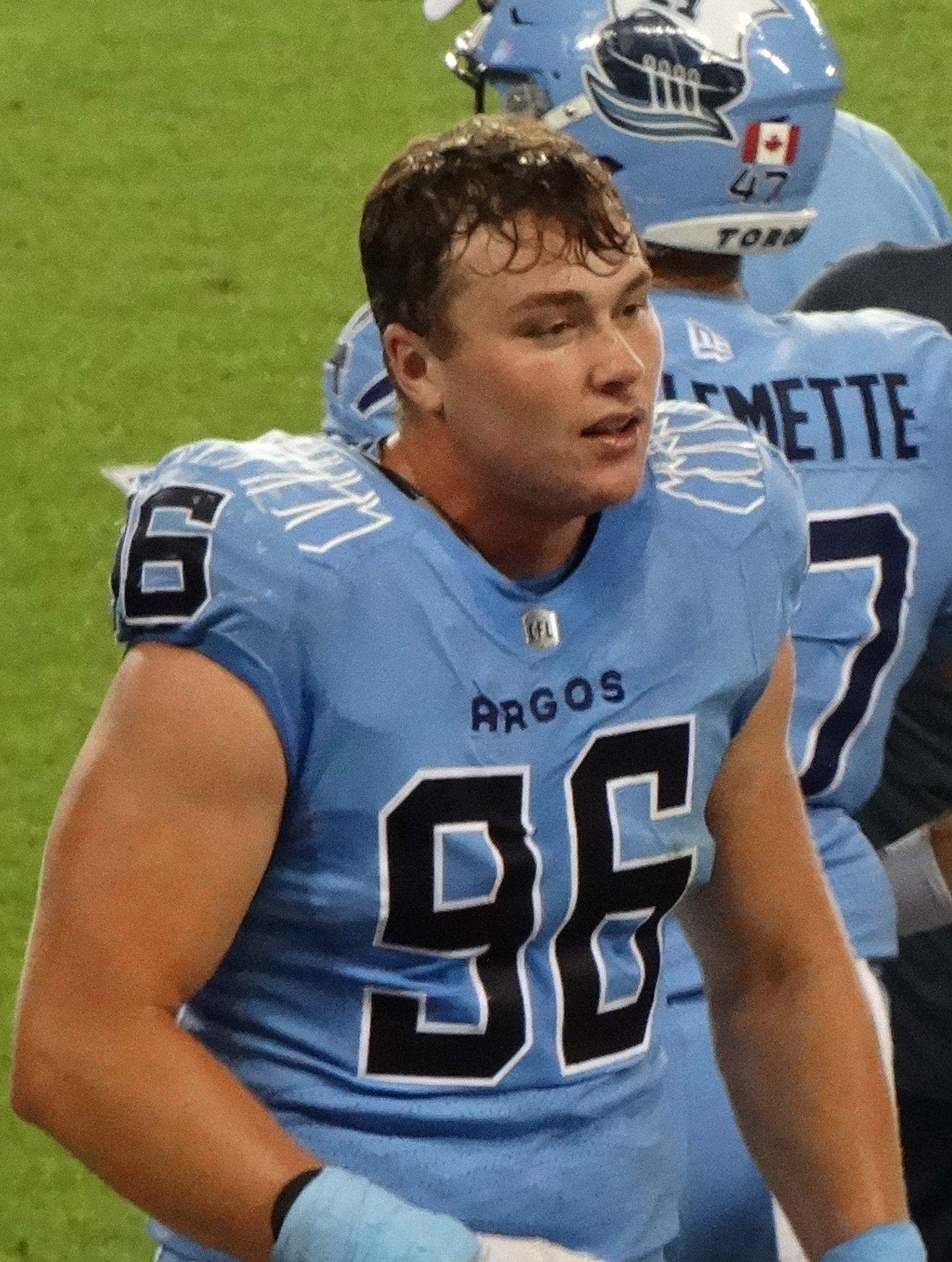
- Hergott with the Toronto Argonauts in 2024

Profile
- Position: Defensive lineman

Personal information
- Born: December 12, 2001 (age 24); Waterloo, Ontario, Canada
- Listed height: 6 ft 2 in (1.88 m)
- Listed weight: 246 lb (112 kg)

Career information
- High school: St. David Catholic
- University: Waterloo
- CFL draft: 2024: 3rd round, 24th overall pick

Career history
- 2024–2025: Toronto Argonauts

Awards and highlights
- Grey Cup champion (2024); First-team All-Canadian (2023)

Career CFL statistics
- Games played: 19
- Defensive tackles: 2
- Special teams tackles: 9
- Stats at CFL.ca

Tyson Hergott (born December 12, 2001) is a Canadian former professional football defensive lineman who played in two seasons for the Toronto Argonauts of the Canadian Football League (CFL). He is a Grey Cup champion after winning with the Argonauts in 2024.

== University career ==
Hergott played U Sports football for the Waterloo Warriors from 2019 to 2023. He did not play in 2020 due to the cancellation of the 2020 U Sports football season due to the COVID-19 pandemic. Then, during the winter of 2021, Hergott suffered an achilles tendon rupture during an off-season workout which caused his to miss the entire 2021 season. In 2023, he recorded 53 total tackles, 13.5 tackles for a loss, 11 sacks, three forced fumbles, and one interception. For his outstanding season, Hergott was named a U Sports First Team All-Canadian and was named the OUA lineman of the year.

== Professional career ==
Pre-draft measurables
Height	Weight	40-yard dash	20-yard shuttle	Three-cone drill	Vertical jump	Broad jump	Bench press
6 ft 2 3/8 in (1.89 m)	246 lb (112 kg)	4.85 s	4.63 s	7.33 s	34.0 in (0.86 m)	8 ft 11 in (2.72 m)	19 reps
All values from CFL Combine

Hergott was drafted in the third round, 24th overall, in the 2024 CFL draft by the Toronto Argonauts and signed with the team on May 1, 2024. Following training camp in 2024, he accepted a practice roster spot with the team. Hergott soon after made his professional debut on July 4, 2024, against the Saskatchewan Roughriders. He played in the remaining 15 games of the regular season where he had two defensive tackles, seven special teams tackles. Hergott also made his post-season debut on November 2, 2024, in the East Semi-Final against the Ottawa Redblacks where he had one special teams tackle in the 58–38 victory. He was a healthy scratch for both the East Final and the 111th Grey Cup where the Argonauts defeated the Winnipeg Blue Bombers and Hergott won his first championship.

In 2025, Hergott played in just four regular season games and recorded two special teams tackles. He retired on January 12, 2026.
