= Mabel Dunham =

Canadian librarian and writer (1881–1957)

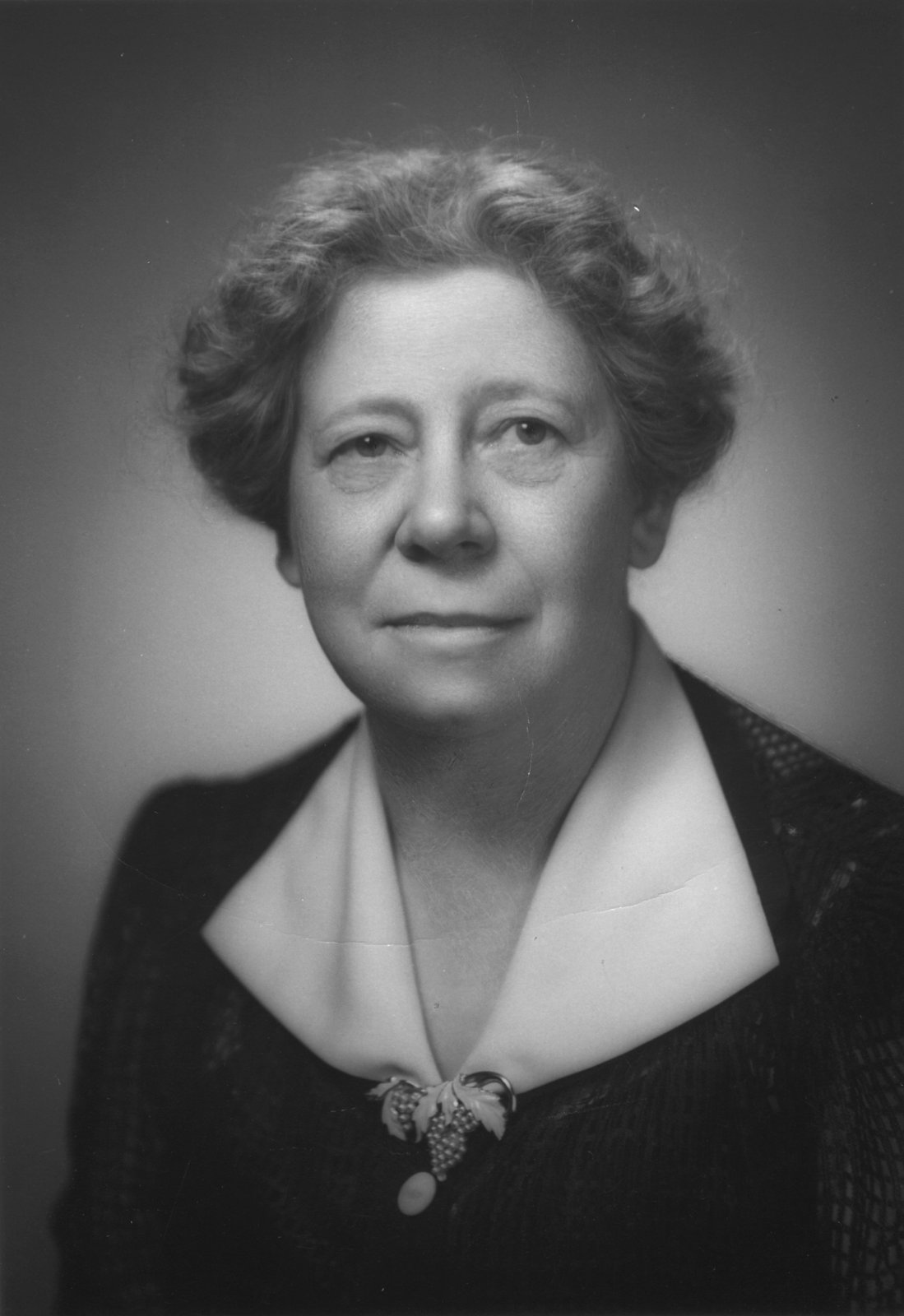
- Mabel Dunham (ca. 1930s)
- Born: Bertha Mabel Dunham; May 29, 1881 near Harriston, Ontario
- Died: June 21, 1957 (aged 76); Kitchener, Ontario
- Burial place: First Mennonite Cemetery, Kitchener, Ontario
- Occupations: Librarian, writer
- Notable work: The Trail of the Conestoga (1924)

Bertha Mabel Dunham (1881–1957) was a Canadian librarian and author. She was the first trained librarian in the province of Ontario to hold the position of chief librarian and wrote several historical fiction books for both children and adults. Dunham worked at the Kitchener Public Library for 36 years, in addition to teaching library science courses and playing an active role within local history and professional communities.

== Early life and education ==
She was born near Harriston, Ontario, on May 29, 1881. Dunham's mother, Magdalena Eby, was a descendant of one of the earliest Mennonite families to settle in what is now the Region of Waterloo and her father, Martin Dunham, was a descent of Scottish Loyalists. She was the great-aunt of Canadian business executive John Cleghorn, whom she later included in the dedication of the children's book Kristli's Trees (1948). The Dunham family relocated to Berlin (now Kitchener) when she was six years of age. She attended Central School (later named Suddaby) and Berlin High School before training as a teacher the Toronto Normal School and returning to Berlin to teach. Not content as a teacher she enrolled at Victoria University where she took courses in language history, obtaining a BA in 1908. She went on to take a library science course at McGill University, becoming the first trained librarian in the province.

== Career ==
Dunham served as chief librarian of the Kitchener Public Library (KPL, initially the Berlin Public Library) from 1908 to 1944. While there she developed the KPL's reference holdings and established a children's story hour. Outside of the library, she served as the President of the Ontario Library Association in 1920. Dunham also taught library science courses at Waterloo College. She was the first person to provide instruction in the area and taught at the school from 1929 to 1946.

Interested in her Mennonite heritage, Dunham wrote several works of historical fiction reflecting settlement of southern Ontario including The Trail of the Conestoga and Grand River. Positively received by the public the book was reprinted twice following its publication by Macmillian in 1924 and a new edition was released in 1933.

In addition to her professional pursuits, Dunham identified the need for a local historical society in a 1912 report to the Berlin Library Board, leading to the foundation of the Waterloo Historical Society. She served as president of the society from 1947 to 1950. Dunham was also elected twice as a representative on the Public School Board. Active within professional networks, Dunham was a member of the Women's Canadian Club, the University Women's Club and the Business and Professional Women's Club.

== Later life ==
Dunham was awarded an honorary doctorate by the University of Western Ontario in 1947. The following year her historical children's novel Kristli's Trees won Book of the Year Medal from the Canadian Association of Children's Librarians. The Canadian Federation of University Women established the Dr. B. Mabel Dunham Fund in 1985. It is awarded annually to a female high school student with the highest overall average in university requirement courses.

Dunham died on June 21, 1957, in Kitchener, Ontario. She was buried at the First Mennonite Cemetery.

== Publications ==
- The Trail of the Conestoga (1924)
- Toward Sodom (1927)
- The Trail of the King’s Men (1931)
- So Great a Heritage (1941)
- Grand River (1945)
- Kristli's Trees (1948)
