= École secondaire catholique Père-Philippe-Lamarche =

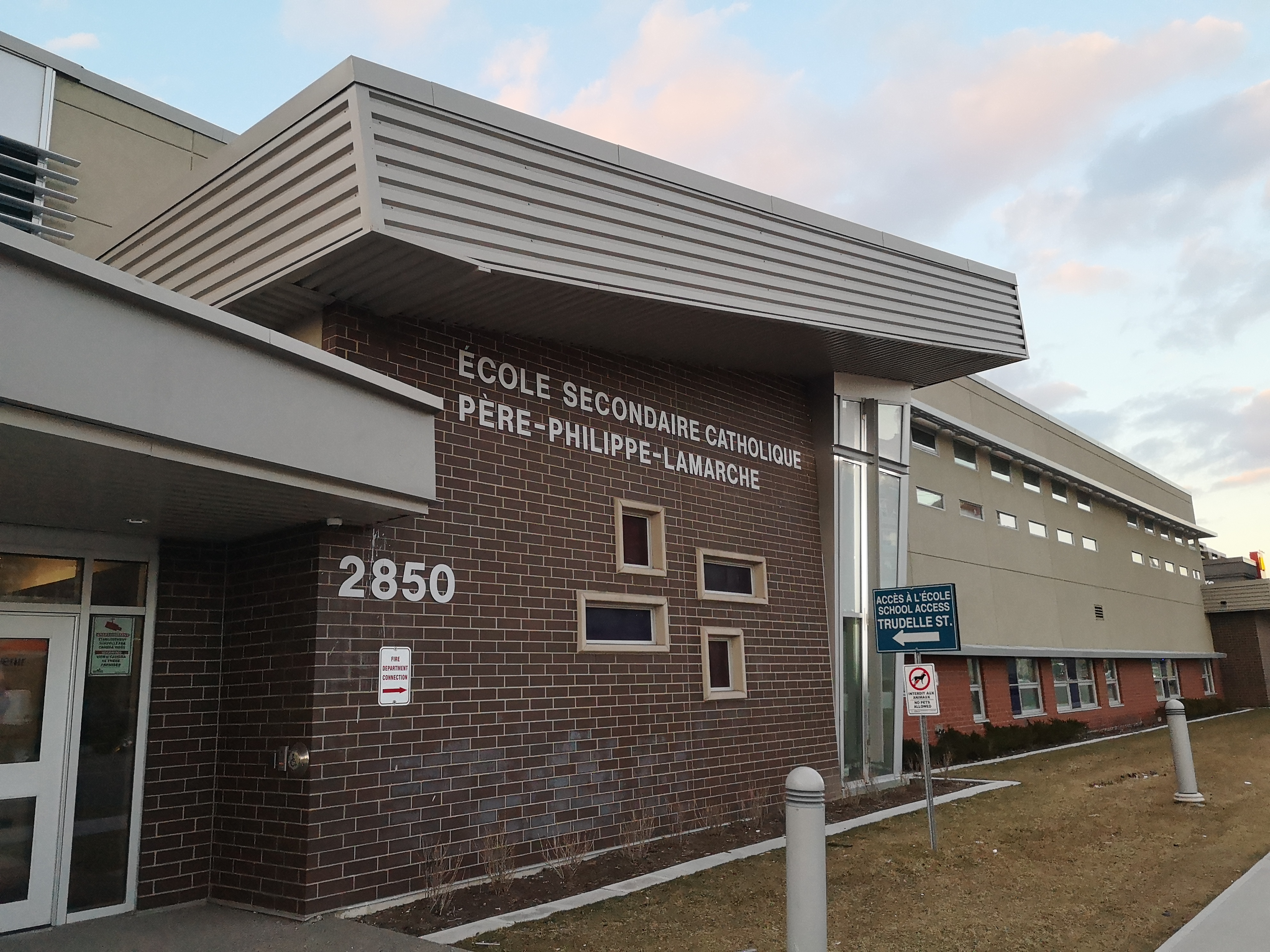

Location
- 2850 Eglinton Avenue East; Eglinton East, Toronto, Ontario, M1J 2C8; Canada; 43°44′19.6224″N 79°14′26.5452″W

Information
- School type: Public separate secondary school
- Motto: Oser Ensemble, Créer L'avenir (Dare Together, Creating the Future)
- Founded: 2017
- School board: Conseil scolaire catholique MonAvenir
- Superintendent: Jérôme Pépin
- Principal: Williams Ngassam
- Language: French
- Website: esppl.cscmonavenir.ca

École secondaire catholique Père-Philippe-Lamarche (transl. Father Père-Philippe-Lamarche Catholic Secondary School, commonly shortened to ESC Père-Philippe-Lamarche or ESCPPL), is a public separate French first language secondary school operated by the Conseil scolaire catholique MonAvenir and located on Eglinton Avenue, in the Toronto neighbourhood of Eglinton East. It is the first public francophone separate secondary school in Scarborough.

The school was named after Father Père-Philippe-Lamarche, a Catholic clergyman who moved to Toronto in 1887 and founded the city's first predominantly French school.

== History ==
Before 1998, Metropolitan Separate School Board (French: Les Conseil des écoles catholiques du Grand Toronto) provided English, and French first language separate education in Metropolitan Toronto, including the former City of Scarborough. (Note: The City of Scarborough was formally dissolved in 1998, when it was amalgamated with the other lower-tier municipalities of Metropolitan Toronto to form the single-tier City of Toronto government.) The school board's Section de langue française unit operated one secondary school in North York, École secondaire catholique Monseigneur-de-Charbonnel. In 1998, the school board's English and French language units were split into two, with the French language unit merging with several other regional French units to form Conseil scolaire de district catholique Centre-Sud (renamed Conseil scolaire catholique MonAvenir in 2017).

The new school board assumed control of Monseigneur-de-Charbonnel, which remained Toronto's only French first language separate secondary school until 2012, when the school board opened École secondaire catholique Saint-Frère-André in the western portion of Toronto. Prior to the opening of ESC Père-Philippe-Lamarche, the school board did not operate a secondary school in Scarborough, the easternmost district of Toronto.

In April 2011, Conseil scolaire Catholique du Centre-sud purchased property on Eglinton Avenue East from the Toronto Catholic District School Board. The 1.922 hectares (4.75 acres) property was a vacant lot, designated as "Site 19" by TCDSB and was formerly reserved for future use. Conseil scolaire Catholique du Centre-sud began building a new secondary school on the property in 2015.

Lamarche was officially opened on 5 September 2017 in a ceremony involving Mitzie Hunter, the Minister of Education, and Marie-France Lalonde, the Minister of Francophone Affairs. Lamarche was the first separate secondary school (English or French) to be opened in Scarborough since 1989, when St. Joan of Arc Catholic Academy opened. The school later held a blessing ceremony in November 2017, presided by Cardinal Thomas Christopher Collins, the Archbishop of Toronto. The new two-storey school was designed by IBI Group.

== See also ==
- Education in Ontario
- List of secondary schools in Ontario
