= St. David Catholic Secondary School =

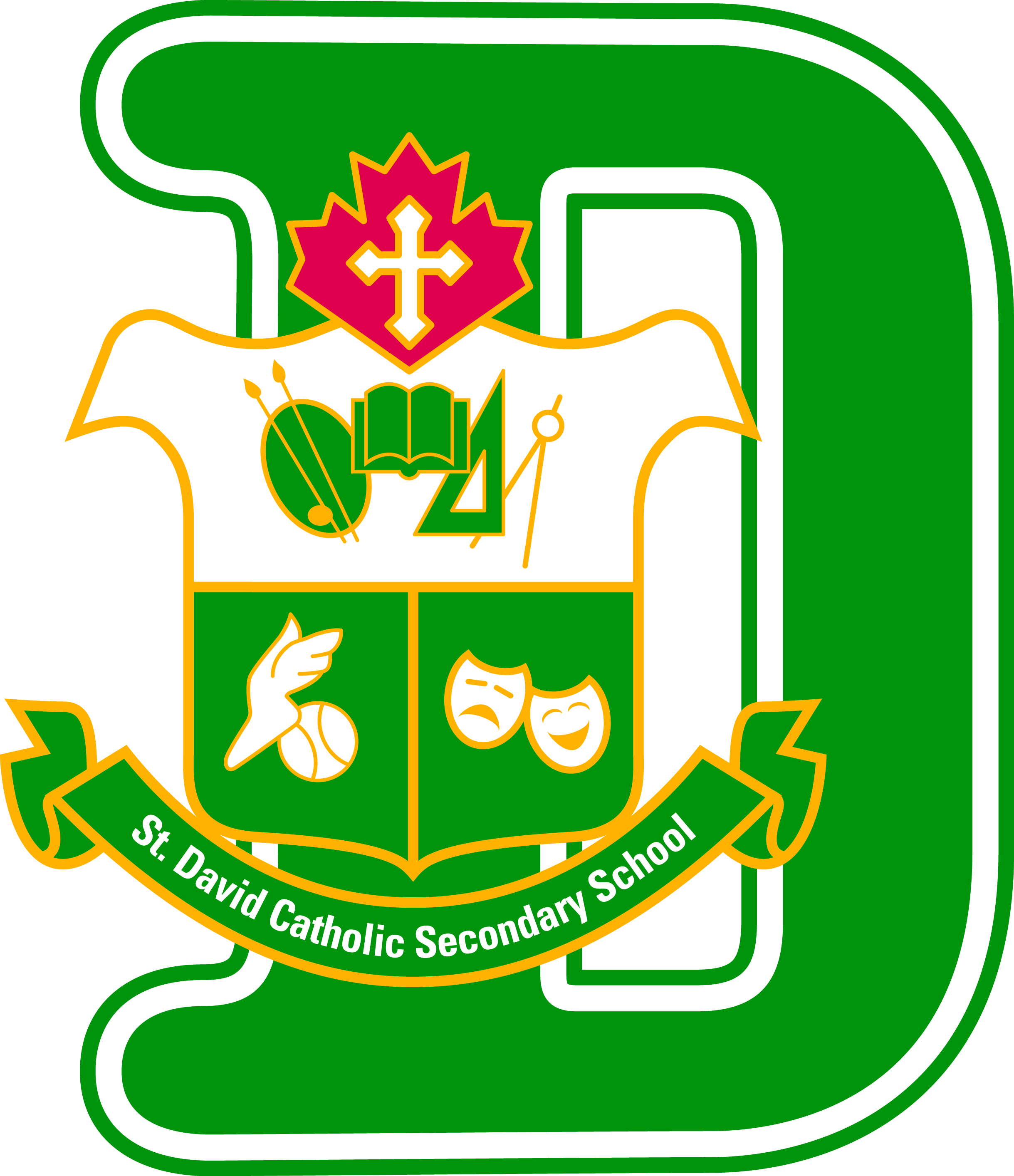

Location
- 4 High Street; Waterloo, Ontario, N2L 3X5; Canada; 43.4843°N 80.5294°W

Information
- School type: Catholic (Separate Board)
- Religious affiliation: Roman Catholic
- Founded: 1965; 61 years ago
- School board: Waterloo Catholic District School Board
- Principal: Heather Papp
- Grades: 9-12
- Enrollment: 970
- Language: English
- Colours: Green, Blue and White
- Mascot: Cedric
- Team name: Celtics (/selt(iks)/)
- Website: stdavid.wcdsb.ca

St. David Catholic Secondary School, established in 1965, is a Roman Catholic high school instructing students from grades 9 to 12. St. David CSS is located in Waterloo, Ontario and is a member of the Waterloo Catholic District School Board. Its building is the oldest secondary school building in the board. Historically, it served as a junior high school, instructing students from grades 7 to 10. In 1985, St. David received full funding from the Ontario Ministry of Education, due to the school changing its educational focus to students in grades 9 to OAC. Since the OAC year of secondary school was phased out of Ontario schools in the 2002–2003 school year, St. David CSS now teaches grades 9 through to 12. At present (2026) St. David educates 970 students. David is named after St David, a 6th-century saint.

== Staff and administration ==
The school's principal is Heather Papp. The vice principals are Christine Bencina and Michael Ambeau.

The school has approximately 84 full-time teaching staff.

== Uniform policy ==
As with the other secondary schools in the Waterloo Catholic District School Board, St. David requires all students to wear a uniform every day, excepting the occasional dress-down day (known to staff and students as "Civies Day").

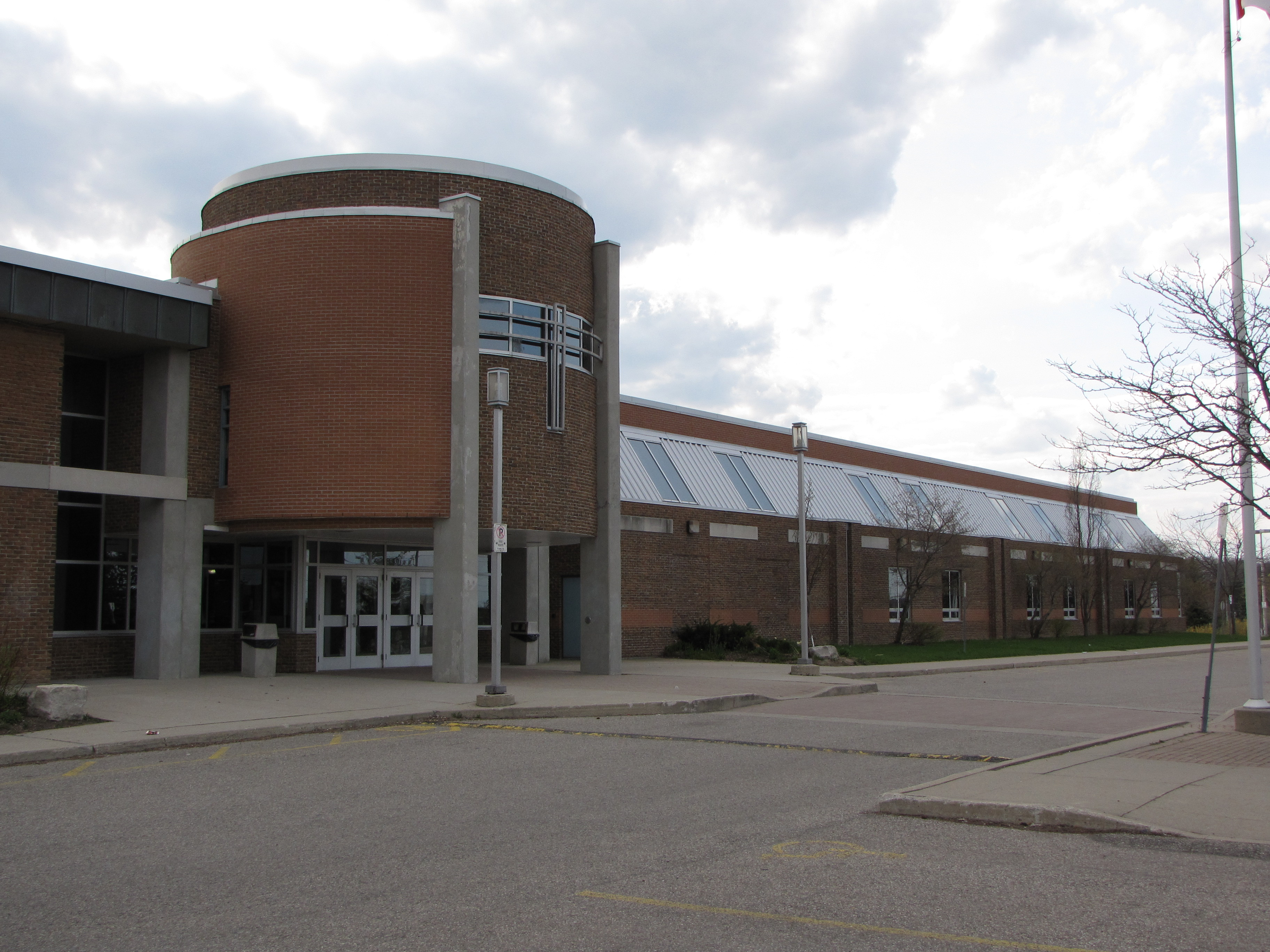

== Notable alumni ==
- Luca Congi, kicker/punter for the Saskatchewan Roughriders. Congi was a member of St. David's senior football team in 2000 and 2001, in which years the team won the Waterloo County high school senior football championships, the first senior football championships in the school's history.
- Tyson Hergott, defensive lineman for the Toronto Argonauts.
- Michael Latta, National Hockey League player.
- John Sullivan, safety for the Winnipeg Blue Bombers.

== See also ==
- Education in Ontario
- List of Waterloo Region, Ontario schools
- List of secondary schools in Ontario
