= Rockway Mennonite Collegiate =

Coordinates: 43.43570°N 80.46397°W

Location
- 110 Doon Road; Kitchener, Ontario, N2J 3C8; Canada

Information
- Type: Private School
- Motto: A small school for a big world
- Established: 1945
- Board Chair: Lori Peebles
- Principal: Josh Hill
- Vice Principal: Stephanie Oliverio
- Faculty: 70 (As of 2024-25 year)
- Grades: 7-12
- Enrolment: Approximately 280 (As of 2024-25 year)
- Colors: Red, Black, White
- Athletics: District 8
- Nickname: Flames
- Yearbook: Lighthouse
- Affiliation: Mennonite Church Eastern Canada
- Website: https://www.rockway.ca
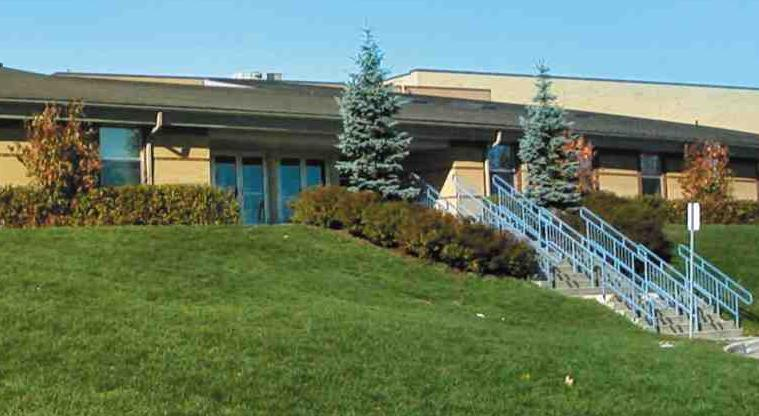
- The front view of the school's main building.

Rockway Mennonite Collegiate (RMC) is an independent Mennonite high school located in Kitchener, Ontario, Canada. It offers academic programs for grade 7–12 students, various cross-cultural exchanges, as well as arts, athletics and tech programs.

Approximately 40% of its 300-student population are Mennonite, coming from the modern Canadian Mennonite church, rather than Old Order Mennonites. Although the school is Mennonite in heritage and beliefs, Rockway accepts students from all types of religions and beliefs.

== History ==
The school was founded by Swiss Mennonites living in Waterloo, frustrated with the increasing military influence on wartime schools in Canada, which clashed with their pacifist beliefs. On February 15, 1945, delegates from Mennonite Conference of Eastern Canada made the decision to open a new Mennonite high school. They raised $50,000 and purchased a farmhouse and barn on Doon Road near the Rockery (now Rockway Gardens) to convert into their first school building. Classes began in September 1945, with twenty-seven grade 9 and eleven grade 10 students. The school's first Principal was Harold Groh and the first teacher was Salome Bauman.

== Arts program ==
The school offers Visual Arts and Music (Theory, History, Instrumental and Choral) to all students in the school. Students in the high school are offered a wider range of Arts courses, which includes Dramatic Arts, a more extensive Visual Arts and Music program, and opportunities for video and audio production.

Rockway hosts two concerts every year, at Christmas and in the spring, which feature the school's various vocal and instrumental ensembles. The school participates in various choral festivals and in 2015 the Sr. Choir received Silver at MusicFest Canada, held in Ottawa.

The school's drama department stages an annual grade 7/8 Drama and a Senior Drama, although every three years, an all-school musical is staged instead. In 2017, The Wizard of Oz was presented. In 2023, Frozen Jr. was presented as Rockway's first musical since the COVID-19 pandemic. The school presented its most recent musical, Charlie and the Chocolate Factory at the end of February 2025.

All School Musicals
School Year	Musical Presented	Show Dates
2016-17	The Wizard of Oz	March 2–4, 2017
2022-23	Frozen Jr.	June 7–10, 2023
2024-25	Charlie and the Chocolate Factory	February 27 - March 1, 2025

Once every year, the Visual Arts committee hosts a public art show, featuring pieces submitted by the students.

== Athletics ==
Rockway has a variety of sports and competitive teams. These include basketball, volleyball, cross-country, badminton, ultimate frisbee, rugby, track & field, and wrestling. Rockway was the District 8 Champions for Senior Girls Volleyball in 2009. Between 2005 and 2008, Rockway medaled four times at "A" OFSAA Basketball. 2005 Silver, 2006 Gold, 2007 Silver, 2008 Bronze. In 2008, the girls senior basketball team won the gold at OFSAA and coach Bernie Burnett became the first coach to receive a gold medal for both the senior girls and boys basketball team. The Senior Boys Volleyball and Basketball teams won CWOSSA and made it to OFSAA in the 2016-17 year. In the 2017-2018 year the senior boys volleyball team made it to OFSAA and the senior boys basketball team won CWOSSA and went to OFSAA.

Rockway is a member of the eight team District 8 Athletic Association.

== International students and exchanges ==
The school hosts dozens of Chinese students annually and supporting a number of senior Rockway students who travel to China. Rockway also attracts students from Germany, South Korea, Japan, Thailand, Malaysia, Hong Kong, Taiwan, Russia and the United States, with roughly 15% of its student body coming from outside of Canada. The school arranges host families for students to live with, has an international students club, and offers English as a second language classes.

There is a yearly exchange to France and Germany available to students after completing Grade 11.

== Community service ==
Community service is a priority for Rockway. One of Rockway's largest service events is the House of Friendship Food Drive. Students purchase food, or collect it door-to-door, which is then donated to the House of Friendship Christmas Hamper Program, partnering with the Food Bank of Waterloo Region and the Salvation Army. Rockway averages over 30,000 food items per year.

== Notable alumni ==
- Carl Zehr, Former Mayor of the City of Kitchener
- Brad Schlegel, Former NHL hockey player
- Joshua Boyle, Canadian kidnapped, with his wife Caitlan Coleman, in Afghanistan in 2012 and then charged in 2019 with public mischief, assault with a weapon, sexual assault and forcible confinement of his wife. The charges were later dismissed.

== See also ==
- Education in Ontario
- List of secondary schools in Ontario
