= Waterloo Catholic District School Board =

Catholic school board in Waterloo Region, Ontario, Canada

Location
- 35 Weber St. W., Unit A Kitchener, Ontario Cambridge, Kitchener, North Dumfries, Waterloo, Wellesley, Wilmot, Woolwich Canada

District information
- Chair of the board: Robert Sikora
- Director of education: Tyrone Dowling
- Schools: 44 Elementary Schools; 5 Secondary Schools; 3 Adult and Continuing Education Campuses
- Budget: $420M
- District ID: DSB49

Students and staff
- Students: 27,700 (2024-25)
- Staff: 4,200

Other information
- Elected Trustees: Robert Sikora; Linda Cuff; Kathy Doherty-Masters; David Guerin; Renee Kraft; Marisa Phillips; Tracey Weiler; Brayden Thompson (2026-2027 Student Trustee); Rashid Abu Ghazaleh (2026-2027 Student Trustee)
- Appointed Trustees: Winston Francis; Conrad Stanley
- Website: www.wcdsb.ca

Waterloo Catholic District School Board (WCDSB) is a school board serving the Region of Waterloo, Ontario, Canada. It is headquartered in Kitchener, and is the seventh largest Catholic school system in Ontario.

As of 2025, the Board operates 44 elementary schools, five secondary schools and three adult and continuing education campuses served by 4,200 full and part-time staff (including teachers, educational assistants, support staff, custodial staff, youth care workers, administrators, and supply staff). The total enrolment is 27,700, plus 13,000 students in adult/continuing education programs.

== History ==
What was to become the Waterloo Catholic District School Board began in 1836 in a log building in St. Agatha, Ontario used by both public and Catholic students. A second Catholic school was built in 1836 in New Germany (now Maryhill, Ontario). The third Catholic school was built in1840 in Preston (now Cambridge, Ontario).

St. Jerome High School, then called a College, was founded in 1865 by Reverend Dr. Louis Funcken and his brother Fr. Eugene Funcken, Fathers of the Congregation of the Resurrection. The first location was a log cabin in St. Agatha but by 1867, the school moved to Duke St. in Kitchener. Initially, its role was to prepare young men for the seminary. This school closed permanently in 1990. The high school building became WLU Kitchener campus in 2006.

By 1907, the local area had 6 Catholic Schools (including a Catholic girls' convent school.) These schools were located in the areas of Berlin (now Kitchener), and Preston (now Cambridge)

With the passage of the British North America Act in 1867, which guaranteed Roman Catholics in Ontario the right to their own Catholic schools, these schools would later extend into all of the Waterloo County. For many years, the teaching staff came from among the Religious – particularly Religious Sisters. Today, hiring is carried out following Ontario legislation. Full funding to the Catholic school system began in 1984.

By 1968, independent Catholic School Boards were operating in Kitchener, Waterloo, Galt, Preston, Hespeler, Bridgeport, New Hamburg, Maryhill, St. Agatha, Linwood, Elmira, and St. Clements. These independent Boards all ceased to exist on January 1, 1969 when the Ontario Legislature amalgamated them into one Board – the Waterloo County Separate School Board.

In 1997, the Waterloo County Separate School Board ceased to exist as a result of a second provincial amalgamation effort. The Waterloo Catholic District School Board was incorporated in 1998 through the Education Act to oversee Catholic schools in the cities of Cambridge, Kitchener, and Waterloo, and the townships of Wilmot, Woolwich, North Dumfries, and Wellesley.

In early 2018, the Board indicated that enrolment was increasing more rapidly in the past four years than in previous years. Between 2005 and 2014, enrolment grew by 2%. Since 2014 however, full-time enrolment had increased from 19,718 to approximately 22,088 students. An estimate at the time indicated that roughly one in three students in the Region are educated by the Catholic Board.

The Waterloo Catholic District School Board published forecasts in 2025 indicating the Board's enrolment would grow from its current level of 27,700 to 41,773 students. Growth is attributed to federal immigration policies, with newcomers preferring a faith-based education, families moving from the GTA in search of more affordable housing, and housing development within the Region.

== Secondary Schools ==
- Monsignor Doyle Catholic Secondary School, Cambridge
- Resurrection Catholic Secondary School, Kitchener
- St. Benedict Catholic Secondary School, Cambridge
- St. David Catholic Secondary School, Waterloo
- St. Mary's High School, Kitchener

== See also ==
- List of school districts in Ontario
- List of high schools in Ontario
- List of Waterloo Region, Ontario schools
- Public Education in Canada
