= Central Western Ontario Secondary Schools Association =

Athletic competitions governing body

Central Western Ontario Secondary Schools Association, or CWOSSA, is the governing body of all secondary school athletic competitions in Bruce, Grey, Wellington, Dufferin, Waterloo, Brant and Norfolk counties of Ontario, Canada.

== Mandate ==
- To establish a closer relationship among the member schools of the Association
- To encourage and promote sound interschool athletic competition among the students of the secondary schools of the member districts

== Districts ==
CWOSSA is divided into several districts that have their own individual championships that qualify athletes for the CWOSSA championships for all sports. This regulation excludes the sport of Cross Country, which is an automatic qualification to CWOSSA for all athletes. The districts are as follows:

- District 1/7 (Bluewater Athletic Association - BAA)
- District 4/10
- District 5 (Brant County Secondary Schools' Athletic Association - BCSSAA)
- District 6/11 (Waterloo County Secondary Schools Athletic Association - WCSSAA)
- District 8
- District 9 (Norfolk Secondary Schools Athletic Association - NSSAA)

== Athletics ==
Only High Schools in the Bruce, Grey, Wellington, Dufferin, Waterloo, Brant and Norfolk counties compete within CWOSSA. The winning team (CWOSSA Champions) will go onto an OFSAA Tournament. The following sports are played through CWOSSA:

- Volleyball
- football
- Gymnastics
- Basketball
- Tennis
- Soccer
- Badminton
- Wrestling
- Rugby
- Swim Team
- Cross Country
- Curling
- Hockey
- Golf
- Nordic Skiing
- Track & Field
- Swimming
- Figure skating
- Mountain Biking
- Track and Field
