= The Amazing Race Canada 5 =

Season of television series

- Season 5
- Presented by: Jon Montgomery
- No. of teams: 10
- Winners: Sam Lambert & Paul Mitskopoulos
- No. of legs: 11
- Distance traveled: 50,000 km (31,000 mi)
- No. of episodes: 11

Release
- Original network: CTV
- Original release: July 4 – September 12, 2017

Additional information
- Filming dates: April 26 – May 24, 2017

Series chronology
- ← Previous; Season 4 Next → Season 6

The Amazing Race Canada 5 is the fifth season of The Amazing Race Canada, a Canadian reality competition show based on the American series The Amazing Race. Hosted by Jon Montgomery, it featured ten teams of two, each with a pre-existing relationship, in a race across Canada and the world. The grand prize included a CA$250,000 cash payout, a trip for two around the world, and two 2018 Chevrolet Equinox SUVs. This season visited six provinces and three additional countries and travelled over 50,000 kilometres (31,000 mi) during eleven legs. Starting in St. John's, racers travelled through Newfoundland and Labrador, British Columbia, Alberta, China, Thailand, Ontario, Quebec, Panama, and Saskatchewan before finishing in Quebec City. A new twist introduced in this season was the 150 Challenge, which was a task themed after the 150th anniversary of Canada. The season premiered on CTV on July 4, 2017, with the season finale airing on September 12, 2017.

Dating couple Sam Lambert and Paul Mitskopoulos were the winners of this season, while best friends Kenneth McAlpine and Ryan Lachapelle finished in second place, and personal trainers and best friends Korey Sam and Ivana Krunić finished in third place.

== Production ==
=== Development and filming ===
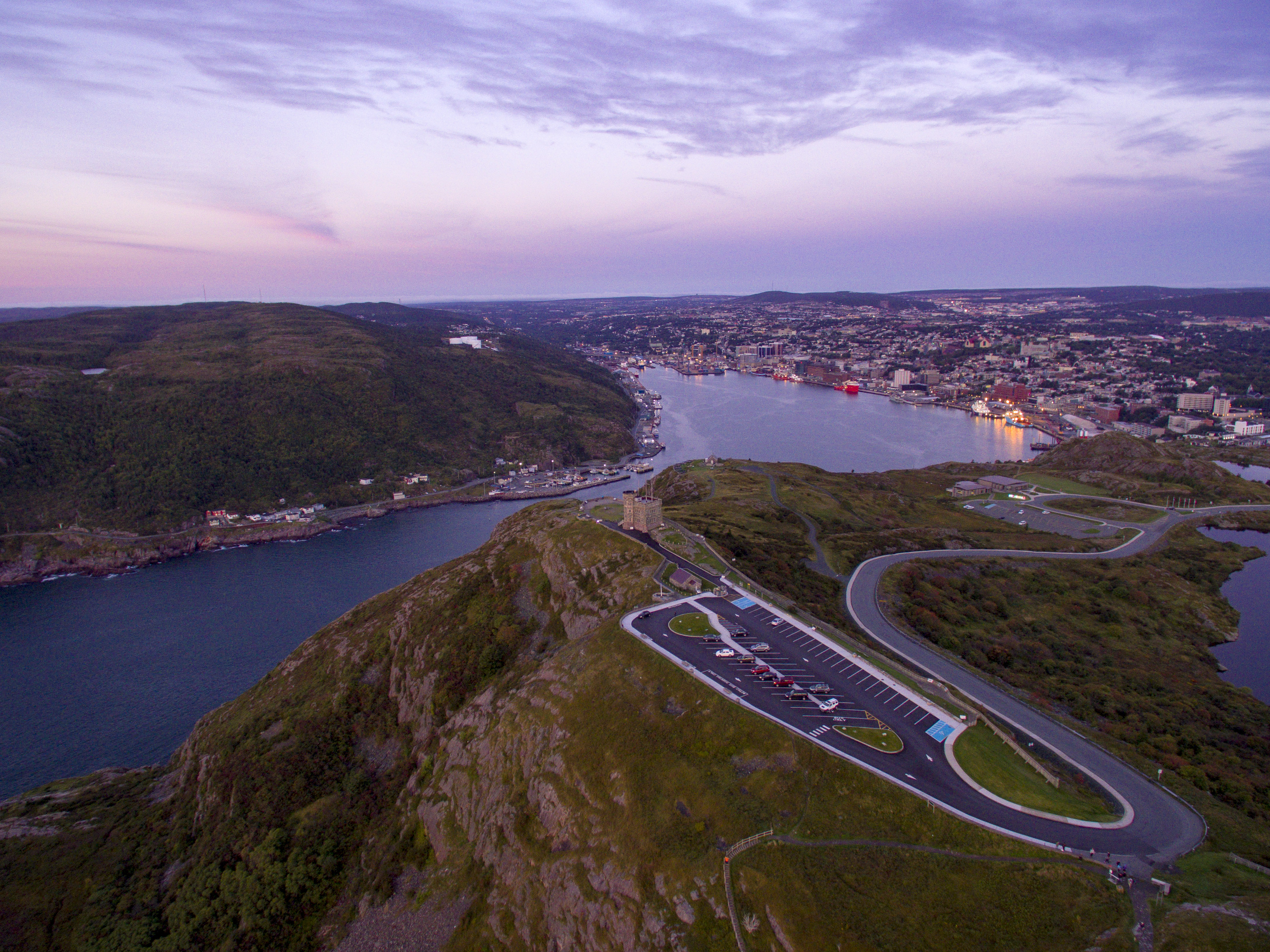
Queen's Battery at the top of Signal Hill, overlooking the city of St. John's, served as the starting line of the fifth season of The Amazing Race Canada.

On October 12, 2016, CTV announced that the show was renewed for the fifth season.

This season featured the addition of several real-time interactive features during the airing of each episode, including trivia, polls, and a national leaderboard. Additionally, viewers were able to explore locations seen throughout the race through virtual 360 degree views, including this season's starting line: Signal Hill National Historic Site in St. John's, Newfoundland and Labrador.

Included among the 360-degree view videos on CTV's official YouTube page was of a game of underwater hockey being played in the swimming pool at the Centre Sportif de Gatineau in Gatineau, Quebec. This was the only 360-degree location to never be seen nor mentioned on air, so it is unknown whether this was originally intended to be a task during the visit to Gatineau in the sixth leg, or was simply unaired.

To mark the occasion of 2017 being the 150th anniversary of the Confederation of Canada, some legs featured a specially-themed task called a 150 Challenge.

According to executive producer John Brunton, an overseas visit to Kenya was originally planned, but was scrapped due to safety concerns.

=== Casting ===
Casting began on October 12, 2016, and as in the previous four seasons, an online site was used for submission of applications and audition videos. Casting closed on December 1, 2016.

=== Programming ===
Similar to previous seasons, a special season-end reunion/recap again titled "After the Race", again hosted by the cast of The Social, aired immediately after the season finale to review the season as a whole.

=== Marketing ===
Trip sponsor Hotels.com, outerwear sponsor Mountain Equipment Co-op, and Mentos discontinued their sponsorships; Chevrolet continued sponsoring the show along with Bank of Montreal (BMO). New sponsors for this season are trip sponsor Sinorama Holidays, Canadian Tire's Woods brand as outerwear/outfitter sponsor, and the Campbell Soup Company.

As additional marketing for sponsor Chevrolet, following each episode, a special series by previous season winners Steph LeClair and Kristen McKenzie entitled Backseat Drivers (a reference to the Roadblock clue in leg 6 of their season) was featured in the bonus videos. In these clips, Steph & Kristen discussed the events of the previous episode while driving a differing Chevrolet vehicle, sometimes stopping to pick up a team from a previous season and discuss what's changed in their lives since their respective season. The featured teams included Hal & Joanne and Holly & Brett from season 1, Rex & Bob from season 2, Brent & Sean and Hamilton & Michaelia from season 3, Frankie & Amy from season 4, and this year's winners Sam & Paul for the finale installment.

== Cast ==
The cast included former Canada's Next Top Model cycle 3 contestant Ebonie Finley-Roberge.

Contestants	Age	Relationship	Hometown	Status
Aaron Baker	30	Mother & Son	Grand Forks, British Columbia	Eliminated 1st (in Vancouver, British Columbia)
Deb Baker	55	Mother & Son	Grand Forks, British Columbia	Eliminated 1st (in Vancouver, British Columbia)
Dan Kipnis	23	YouTube Creators	Toronto, Ontario	Eliminated 2nd (in Fort McMurray, Alberta)
Riya Malik	23	YouTube Creators	Toronto, Ontario	Eliminated 2nd (in Fort McMurray, Alberta)
Megan Burden	23	Cousins	St. John's, Newfoundland and Labrador	Eliminated 3rd (in Kokanee Creek Provincial Park, British Columbia)
Courtney Roberts	21	Cousins	St. John's, Newfoundland and Labrador	Eliminated 3rd (in Kokanee Creek Provincial Park, British Columbia)
Zed Dhalla	27	Father & Son	Vancouver, British Columbia	Eliminated 4th (in Bangkok, Thailand)
Shabbir Dhalla	57	Father & Son	Vancouver, British Columbia	Eliminated 4th (in Bangkok, Thailand)
Andrea Croxen	29	Business Partners	Montreal, Quebec	Eliminated 5th (in Corner Brook, Newfoundland and Labrador)
Ebonie Finley-Roberge	29	Business Partners	Montreal, Quebec	Eliminated 5th (in Corner Brook, Newfoundland and Labrador)
Adam Cavaleri	29	Brother & Sister	Montreal, Quebec	Eliminated 6th (in Bushell Park, Saskatchewan)
Andrea Cavaleri	28	Brother & Sister	Montreal, Quebec	Eliminated 6th (in Bushell Park, Saskatchewan)
Karen Richards	31	Married Couple	Edmonton, Alberta	Eliminated 7th (in Sault Ste. Marie, Ontario)
Bert Richards	36	Married Couple	Edmonton, Alberta	Eliminated 7th (in Sault Ste. Marie, Ontario)
Korey Sam	31	Personal Trainers/Best Friends	Toronto, Ontario	Third place
Ivana Krunić	31	Personal Trainers/Best Friends	Toronto, Ontario	Third place
Kenneth McAlpine	25	Best Friends	Rossland, British Columbia	Runners-up
Ryan Lachapelle	25	Best Friends	Rossland, British Columbia	Runners-up
Sam Lambert	25	Dating Couple	Toronto, Ontario	Winners
Paul Mitskopoulos	24	Dating Couple	Toronto, Ontario	Winners

=== Future appearances ===
Sam & Paul were the Pit Stop greeters of during the sixth leg of season 6 at Ireland Park in their hometown of Toronto.

On February 5, 2020, Karen & Bert competed with their family on an episode of Family Feud Canada. On November 30, 2020, Sam competed on the same show with his family.

== Results ==
The following teams are listed with their placements in each leg. Placements are listed in finishing order.

- A red placement with a dagger (†) indicates that the team was eliminated.
- An underlined blue placement with a double-dagger (‡) indicates that the team was the last to arrive at a Pit Stop in a non-elimination leg, and had to perform a Speed Bump task in the following leg.
- An italicized and underlined placement indicates that the team was the last to arrive at a Pit Stop, but there was no rest period at the Pit Stop and all teams were instructed to continue racing.
- A green ƒ indicates that the team won the Fast Forward.
- A purple ε indicates that the team used an Express Pass on that leg to bypass one of their tasks.
- A brown ⊃ indicates that the team used the U-Turn and a brown ⊂ indicates the team on the receiving end of the U-Turn.
- A teal х indicates that the leg featured a Face Off challenge.

Team placement (by leg)
Team	1	2	3	4	5	6	7х (Note: This leg featured a Face Off challenge.)	8	9	10х	11
Sam & Paul	4th	3rd	4th	1st	3rd	2nd⊃ (Note: Sam & Paul chose to use the U-Turn on Kenneth & Ryan.)	1st	1st	1st⊂ (Note: Kenneth & Ryan chose to use the U-Turn on Sam & Paul.)	1st	1st
Kenneth & Ryan	1st	5th	6thε (Note: This team used their Express Pass to bypass one of the tasks on this leg.)	4th	4th	5th⊂	2nd	2nd	2nd⊃	3rd	2nd
Korey & Ivana	2nd	8th	2nd	6th	6th	3rd⊃ (Note: Korey & Ivana chose to use the U-Turn on Andrea & Ebonie.)	5th	4th	4th⊃ (Note: Korey & Ivana chose to use the U-Turn on Adam & Andrea.)	2nd	3rd
Karen & Bert	6th	4th	5thɛ	5th	5th	4th	4th	5th‡	3rd	4th†	
Adam & Andrea	3rd	7th	3rd	3rd	1stƒ (Note: This team won the Fast Forward on this leg.)	1st	3rd	3rd	5th†⊂		
Andrea & Ebonie	7th (Note: Andrea & Ebonie initially arrived 2nd, but they were issued a 2-hour penalty for failing to complete the Morse code challenge. Five teams checked in during this penalty time, dropping Andrea & Ebonie to 7th.)	2nd	7th	7th (Note: This team arrived last at the Pit Stop, but they were instructed to continue racing.)	2nd	6th‡⊂	6th†				
Zed & Shabbir	5th	6th	1st	2nd	7th†						
Megan & Courtney	9th	1st	8th†								
Dan & Riya	8th	9th†									
Aaron & Deb	10th†										

== Race summary ==
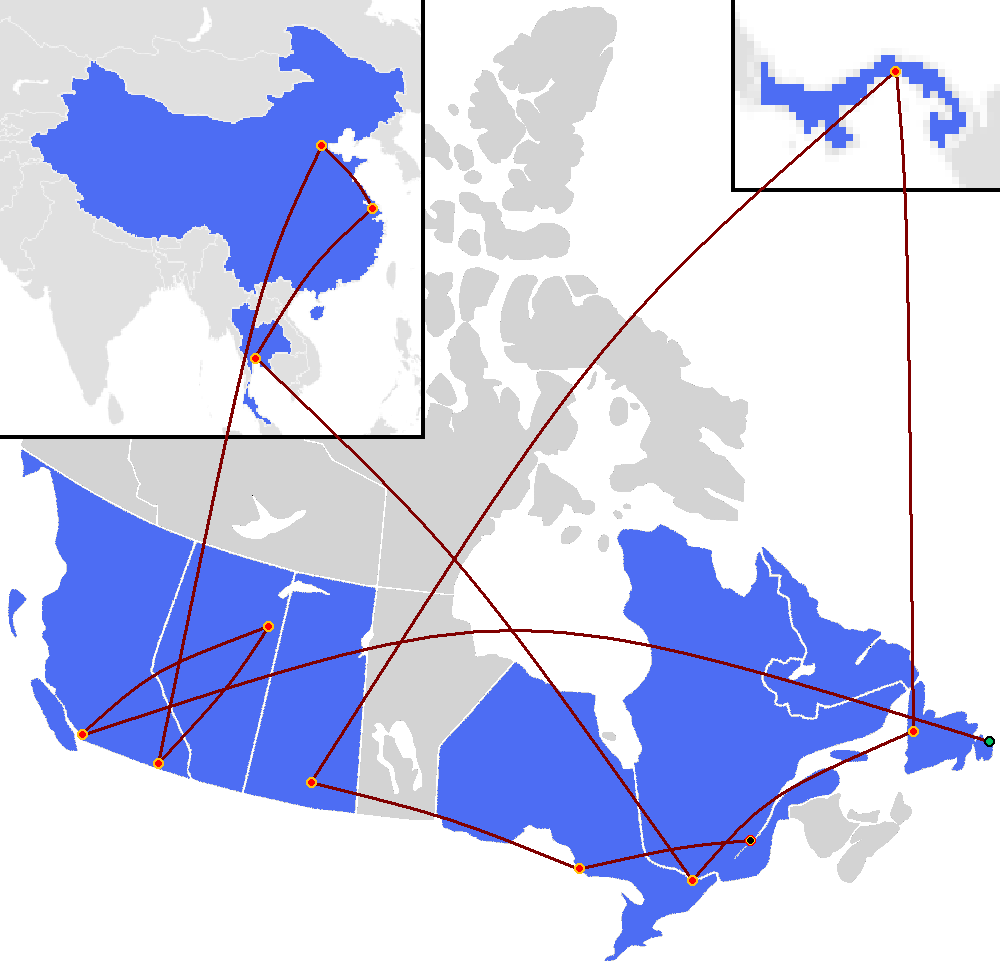
Complete race route of the fifth season of The Amazing Race Canada

Destinations	Air travel Rail travel Water travel Bus travel Helicopter travel Bicycle travel Gondola travel
Route Markers	Detour Roadblock Fast Forward Face Off 150 Challenge; Express Pass U-Turn Speed Bump Pit Stop

=== Leg 1 (Newfoundland and Labrador → British Columbia) ===
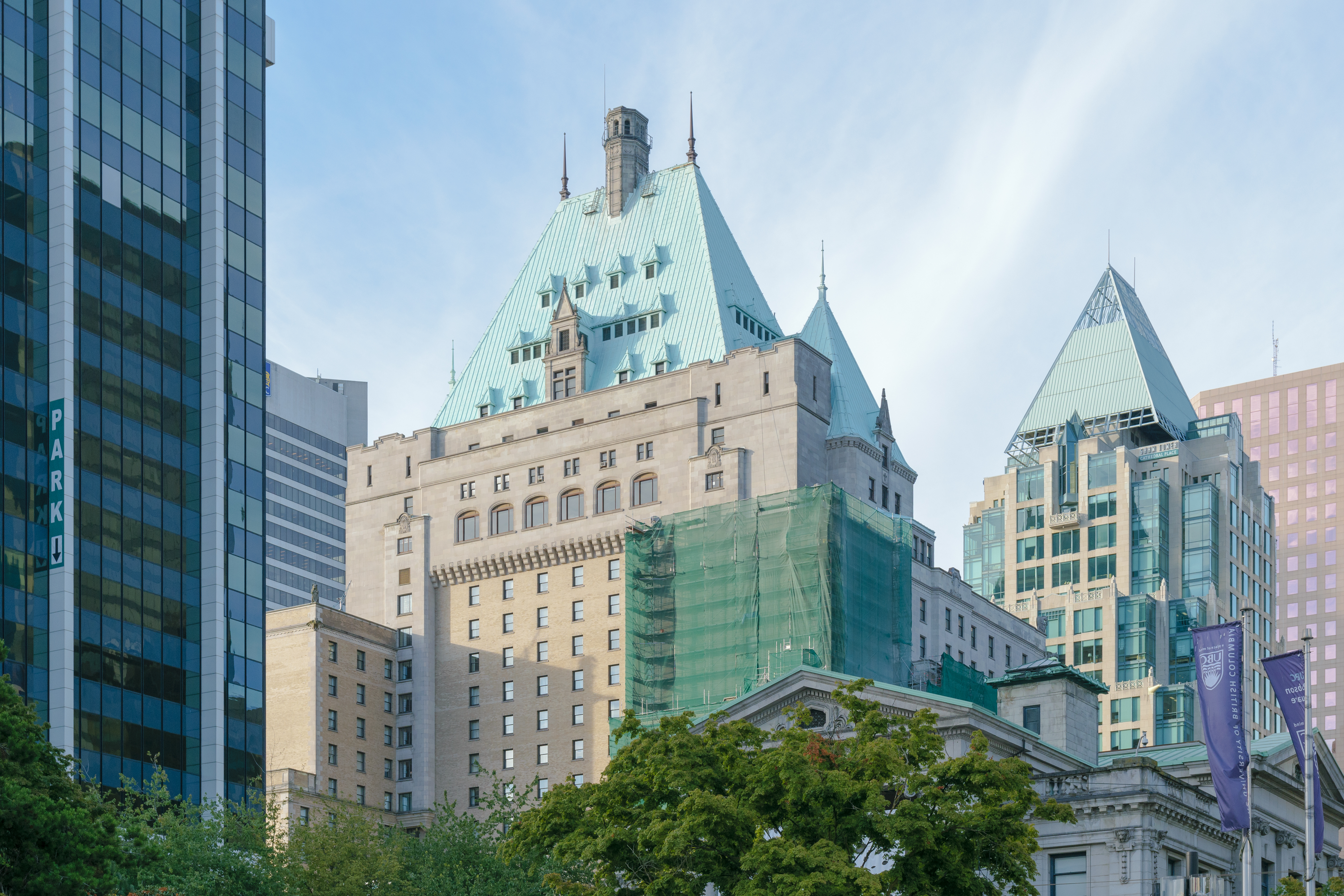
The first Roadblock paid a visit to one of Vancouver's first high-rise buildings, The Fairmont Hotel, where racers performed a tightrope walk.

- Episode 1: "Who Wants to Be the Python?" (July 4, 2017)
- Prize: A trip for two to Barcelona, Spain (awarded to Kenneth & Ryan)
- Eliminated: Aaron & Deb

Locations

- St. John's, Newfoundland and Labrador (Signal Hill National Historic Site – Queen's Battery) (Starting Line)
- St. John's (Signal Hill National Historic Site – Cabot Tower)
- St. John's → Vancouver, British Columbia
- Vancouver (Capilano Suspension Bridge Park)
- Vancouver (Gastown – "Gassy Jack" Deighton Statue)
- Vancouver (The Fairmont Hotel Vancouver)
- Vancouver (Sunset Beach or False Creek)
- Vancouver (VanDusen Botanical Garden – Hedge Maze)

Episode summary

- Teams set off from the starting line at Queen's Battery, at the top of Signal Hill in St. John's, and had to make their way to Cabot Tower. There, teams had to listen to a Morse code message transmitted from the ham radio station inside the tower and decipher their first destination. Once teams had deciphered the correct answer – Vancouver Capilano Bridge – they received their next clue, which also contained a Bank of Montreal credit card that served as the teams' source of money for the duration of the season.
- Teams flew to Vancouver, British Columbia. Once there, teams had to search the grounds of the Capilano Suspension Bridge Park for a falconer who gave teams their next clue, instructing them to find the "Gassy Jack" statue in Maple Tree Square, where they found their next clue.
- In this season's first Roadblock and 150 Challenge, one team member had to walk across a tightrope suspended 12 storeys across the front of The Fairmont Hotel Vancouver in order to retrieve the next clue.
- This season's first Detour was a choice between Pedal or Paddle. In Pedal, teams travelled to Sunset Beach, where they had to complete two cycle polo drills. First, each team member had to maneuver the ball using a plastic mallet through a series of cones while riding a bicycle. They then had to pass the ball back and forth to each other and score one goal in order to receive their next clue. In Paddle, teams joined a dragon boat racing crew. One team member helped paddle while the other steered the boat with an oar through a course on False Creek using specific commands. Once they completed the course, teams received their next clue.
- After the Detour, teams travelled to the VanDusen Botanical Garden and had to find the Pit Stop inside the hedge maze.

=== Leg 2 (British Columbia → Alberta) ===
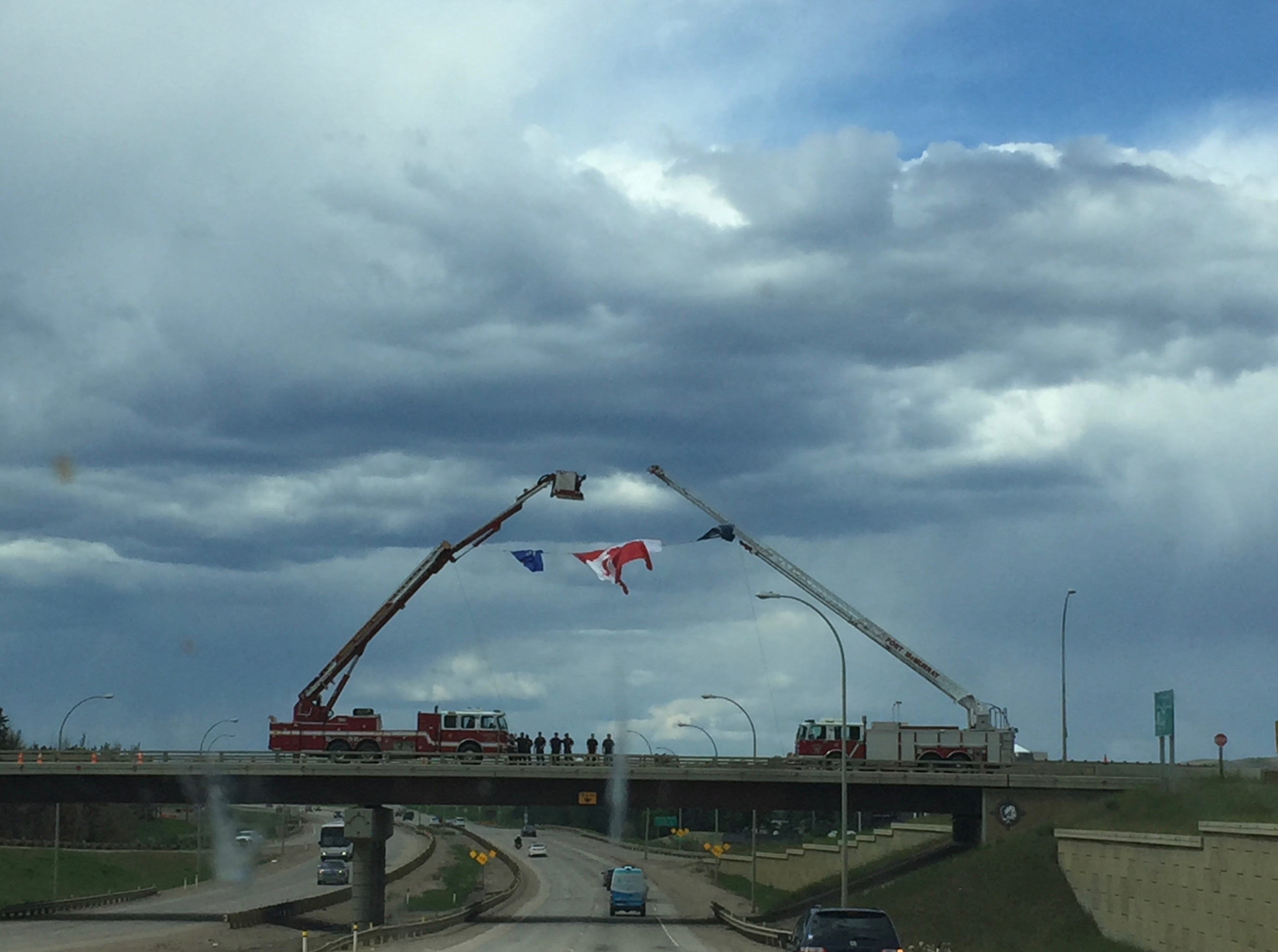
The leg in Fort McMurray featured tributes to emergency responders following the 2016 Fort McMurray wildfire.

- Episode 2: "You've Got to Leave My Hose Alone Dude!" (July 11, 2017)
- Prize: A trip for two to Auckland, New Zealand (awarded to Megan & Courtney)
- Eliminated: Dan & Riya

Locations

- Vancouver (Seawall Water Walk)
- Vancouver → Fort McMurray, Alberta (Fort McMurray International Airport)
- R.M. of Wood Buffalo (Vista Ridge – Wild Play Park)
- R.M. of Wood Buffalo (Fort McMurray Fish and Game Association)
- R.M. of Wood Buffalo (Phoenix Heli-Flight) → Fort McMurray (MacDonald Island Park – SMS Stadium at Shell Place)
- Fort McMurray (MacDonald Island Park – Miskanaw Golf Club)

Episode summary

- At the start of this leg, teams were instructed to fly to Fort McMurray, Alberta. Once there, teams had to search outside the airport terminal for their marked vehicle, where they also found their clue inside. Teams then had to drive to Wild Play Park in order to find their next clue.
- In this leg's Roadblock, one team member had to search Wild Play Park for three different coloured pieces of their next clue in pouches scattered among the park's 50 platforms. Additionally, three of the pouches contained an Express Pass. Kenneth & Ryan found the Express Passes.
- This leg's Detour at the Fort McMurray Fish and Game Association was a choice between Pump It or Pull It, both of which a limit of five stations. In Pump It (the 150 Challenge of the leg), teams had to suit up as firefighters and carry a 120-pound (54 kg) water pump to a nearby reservoir and figure out how to correctly operate the pump. After attaching a fire hose, teams then had to completely extinguish a controlled fire 50 feet (15 m) away in order to receive their next clue. In Pull It, teams had to shoot a total of 15 clay targets with a 20-gauge shotgun, alternating partners after every three shots, in order to receive their next clue.
- In the hangar at Phoenix Heli-Flight, teams had to use figures from a helicopter's previous trip to calculate the missing fuel weight fraction values needed to determine its centre of gravity. Once teams filled in the correct solution, they received their next clue and were flown in a helicopter over an area destroyed by the 2016 Fort McMurray wildfire, to SMS Stadium in MacDonald Island Park. Once there, they had to search for the Pit Stop: the sixteenth hole at Miskanaw Golf Club.

=== Leg 3 (Alberta → British Columbia) ===
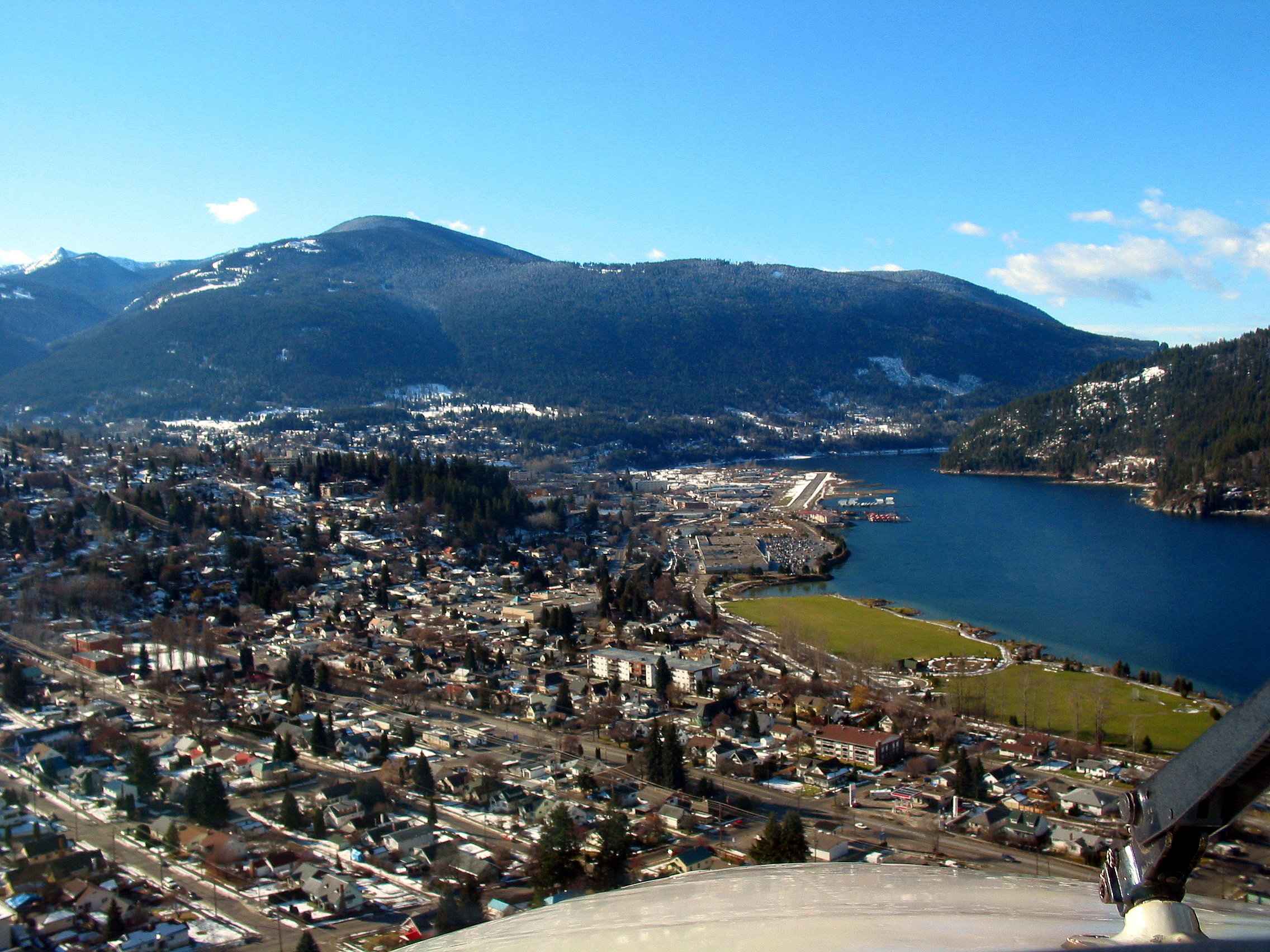
Teams visited the mountainous town of Nelson in the Kootenays region of southeastern British Columbia in this leg.

- Episode 3: "It's Like Ducks In the Forest" (July 18, 2017)
- Prize: A trip for two to Chicago, Illinois (awarded to Zed & Shabbir)
- Eliminated: Megan & Courtney

Locations

- R.M. of Wood Buffalo (Syncrude Giants of Mining Exhibit)
- Fort McMurray → Castlegar, British Columbia
- Castlegar (Chances Casino) (Unaired)
- Castlegar (Columbia River – Zuckerberg Island)
- Nelson (Oso Negro Coffee Roastery)
- Nelson (Kootenay Lake – "Big Orange Bridge")
- Nelson (Selkirk College School of the Arts)
- Kokanee Creek Provincial Park (Kootenay Lake)

Episode summary

- At the start of this leg, teams were instructed to fly to Castlegar, British Columbia. Once there, teams found a marked vehicle outside Chances Casino. Additionally, the team who drove the most efficiently using the car's regenerative braking feature would receive a $5,000 prize at the Pit Stop. Kenneth & Ryan won this prize.
- At Zuckerberg Island, teams had to inspect a campsite, and then locate nine other campsites in the vicinity and correctly identify the single difference from the example they'd inspected at each of them in order to receive their next clue.
- At Oso Negro Coffee Roastery, teams had to make two deliveries of custom coffee blends on foot and then return to the roastery to receive the clue for the Roadblock. Karen & Bert used their Express Pass to bypass this task.
- In this leg's Roadblock, one team member had to put on a wetsuit and swing from a cord beneath the Nelson Bridge, known locally as the "Big Orange Bridge," letting go and landing as close as possible to a buoy, which held their clue. They then had to swim the rest of the way across Kootenay Lake to the dock, where they reunited with their partner.
- This leg's Detour was a choice between Strike It or Throw It. In Strike It, teams had to use provided blacksmith tools to forge red-hot irons into two coat hooks that matched a given example in order to receive their next clue. In Throw It, teams had to use a potter's wheel and provided tools to correctly throw two ceramic cups from clay in order to receive their next clue. Kenneth & Ryan used their Express Pass to bypass the Detour.
- After the Detour, teams had to check in at the Pit Stop: Kootenay Lake in Kokanee Creek Provincial Park.

Additional note

- It was reported that contestants entered Chances Casino after arriving in Castlegar, but this segment was unaired.

=== Leg 4 (British Columbia → China) ===
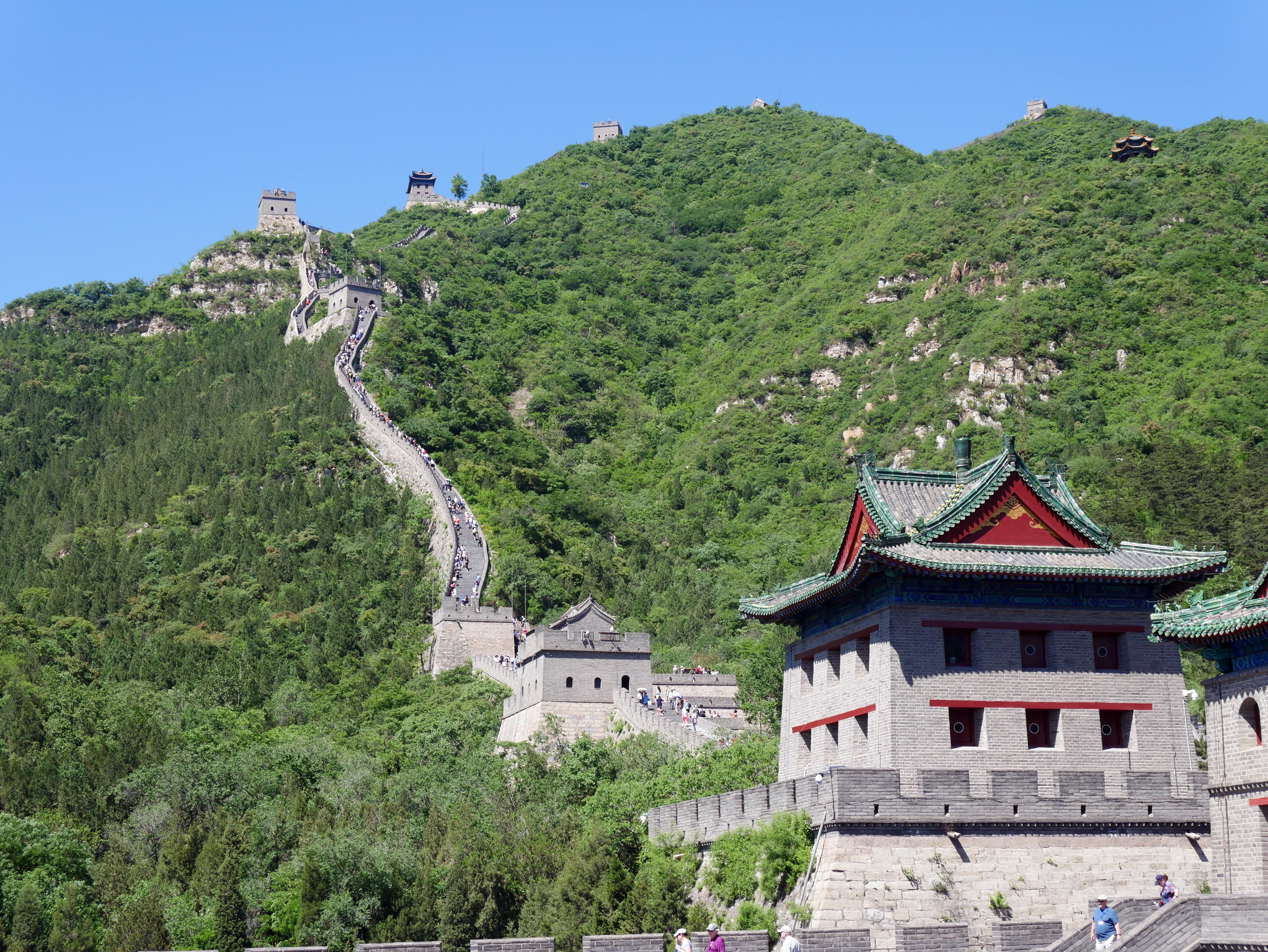
While in China, teams visited the famous Great Wall of China at Juyong Pass, where they had to act as tour guides.

- Episode 4: "This Is a Butt Workout" (July 25, 2017)
- Prize: A trip for two to Beijing, Xi'an, Shanghai, and the Yangtze River in China (awarded to Sam & Paul)

Locations

- Nelson (Prestige Lakeside Resort)
- Castlegar → Vancouver
- Richmond (Sinorama Tours Office)
- Vancouver → Beijing, China
- Beijing (Great Wall of China – Juyong Pass)
- Beijing (Canadian Embassy)
- Beijing (Ying Tung Natatorium)
- Beijing (Ren Yi Tang)
- Beijing (Drum Tower Square)

Episode summary

- At the start of this leg, teams were instructed to fly to Beijing, China. Teams first had to fly to Vancouver and travel to the local office of Sinorama Holidays in order to receive a travel package, which included their airplane tickets to Beijing. Once there, teams had to travel to Juyong Pass along the Great Wall of China, where they had to dress as tour guides, and memorize and correctly recite facts about the Wall in three languages (English, French, and Mandarin Chinese) to a group of tourists in order to receive their next clue. Teams then had to travel to the Canadian Embassy in Beijing and interrupt a game of ball hockey in order to receive their clue from the goalie.
- This leg's Detour was a choice between In Sync or In Line, both taking place at the Ying Tung Natatorium. In In Sync, teams had to perform a synchronized dive from the five-metre (16 ft) diving platform and earn a combined score of 20 or more from the three judges in order to receive their next clue. In In Line, teams had to dress in colourful costumes and correctly perform a dance routine on the terrace, combining a flash mob and line dancing, in order to receive their next clue.
- After the Detour, teams found their next clue at Ren Yi Tang.
- In this leg's Roadblock at Ren Yi Tang, a traditional pharmacy, one team member was given a herbal remedy prescription, with three ingredients written in Chinese characters, and had to search among 800 drawers for the three drawers with corresponding characters. Once they found all three ingredients, they had to weigh the correct doses in order to receive their next clue directing them to the Pit Stop: Drum Tower Square.

Additional note

- There was no elimination at the end of this leg; all teams were instead instructed to continue racing.

=== Leg 5 (China → Thailand) ===
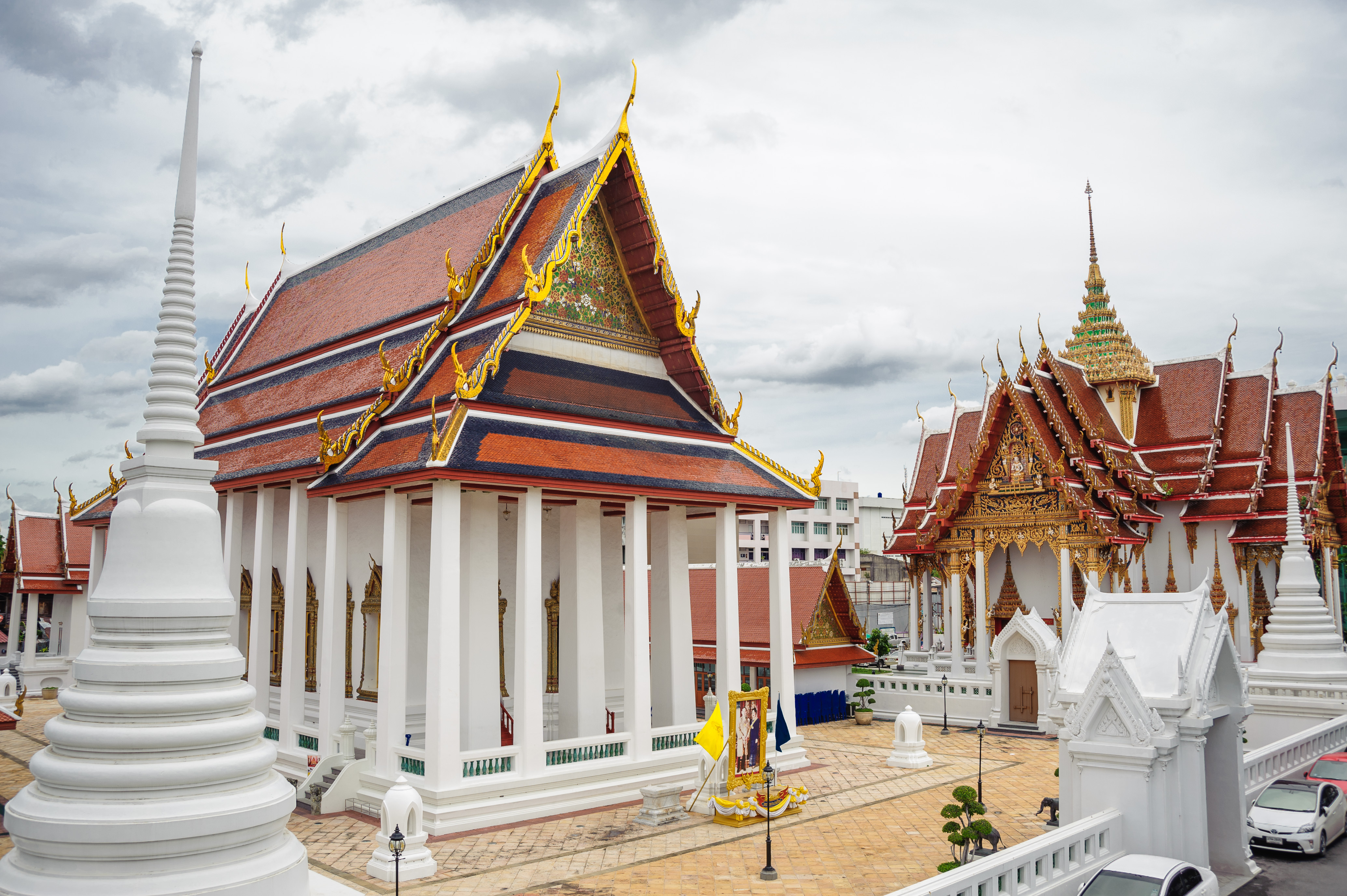
Teams ended this leg in Thailand at Wat Thewarat Kunchorn Temple in Bangkok.

- Episode 5: "This Is a Real Cat and Mouse Chase" (August 1, 2017)
- Prize: A trip for two to Bangkok, Chiang Mai, and the Golden Triangle of Thailand; as well as Yangzhou and Shanghai, China (awarded to Adam & Andrea)
- Eliminated: Zed & Shabbir

Locations

- Beijing (Beijing South Railway Station) → Shanghai
- Shanghai (Tock's Montreal Style Deli)
- Shanghai → Bangkok, Thailand
- Bangkok (Caturday Café)
- Bangkok (National Stadium)
- Bangkok (Yodpiman Riverwalk → Wat Khuha Sawan – Artist's House)
- Bangkok (Wat Ratchanatdaram, Amulet Market & Khlong Thom Centre or Flow House)
- Bangkok (Wat Thewarat Kunchorn Temple)

Episode summary

- After receiving their clue and a pair of plush elephant toys from Jon, teams had to search in front of the Beijing South railway station for a Sinorama Holidays representative, who gave them high-speed train tickets to Shanghai. After arriving in Shanghai, teams had to travel to Tock's Montreal Style Deli, where they had to repeat a Mandarin phrase that they'd learned at the Great Wall on the previous leg – "Xie xie ni" – to a Sinorama representative, who gave them their next clue. Teams were then instructed to fly to Bangkok, Thailand. Once there, teams had to travel to the Caturday Café and search inside for their next clue.
- Teams who chose to attempt the Fast Forward had to travel to the grounds of the National Stadium and participate in the Thai sport of hoop takraw. Adam & Andrea won the Fast Forward.
- Teams who chose to not attempt the Fast Forward had to travel by water taxi from the Yodpiman Riverwalk to the Artist's House at Wat Khuha Sawan. There, they had to dress in black and, in complete silence, choreograph a traditional Thai puppet show with a hand-carved puppet depicting the mythical figure Hanuman, including specific interactions with audience members, in order to receive their next clue.
- This leg's Detour was a choice between Bling It or Shred It. In Bling It, teams had to travel to Wat Ratchanatdaram, where they had to choose a tuk-tuk to decorate. They had to compare two decorated tuk-tuks to determine which decorations were identical on both, including the plush pandas and elephants that they'd been given earlier. They then had to search the nearby Amulet Market and Khlong Thom Centre to buy the necessary decorations to affix to their chosen tuk-tuk. Once all of the details were correct, teams received their next clue. In Shred It, teams had to travel to Flow House, where both team members had to maintain their balance while surfing on an artificially-generated wave and grabbing a flag hanging overhead in order to receive their next clue.
- After the Detour, teams had to check in at the Pit Stop: Wat Thewarat Kunchorn Temple.

=== Leg 6 (Thailand → Ontario → Quebec) ===
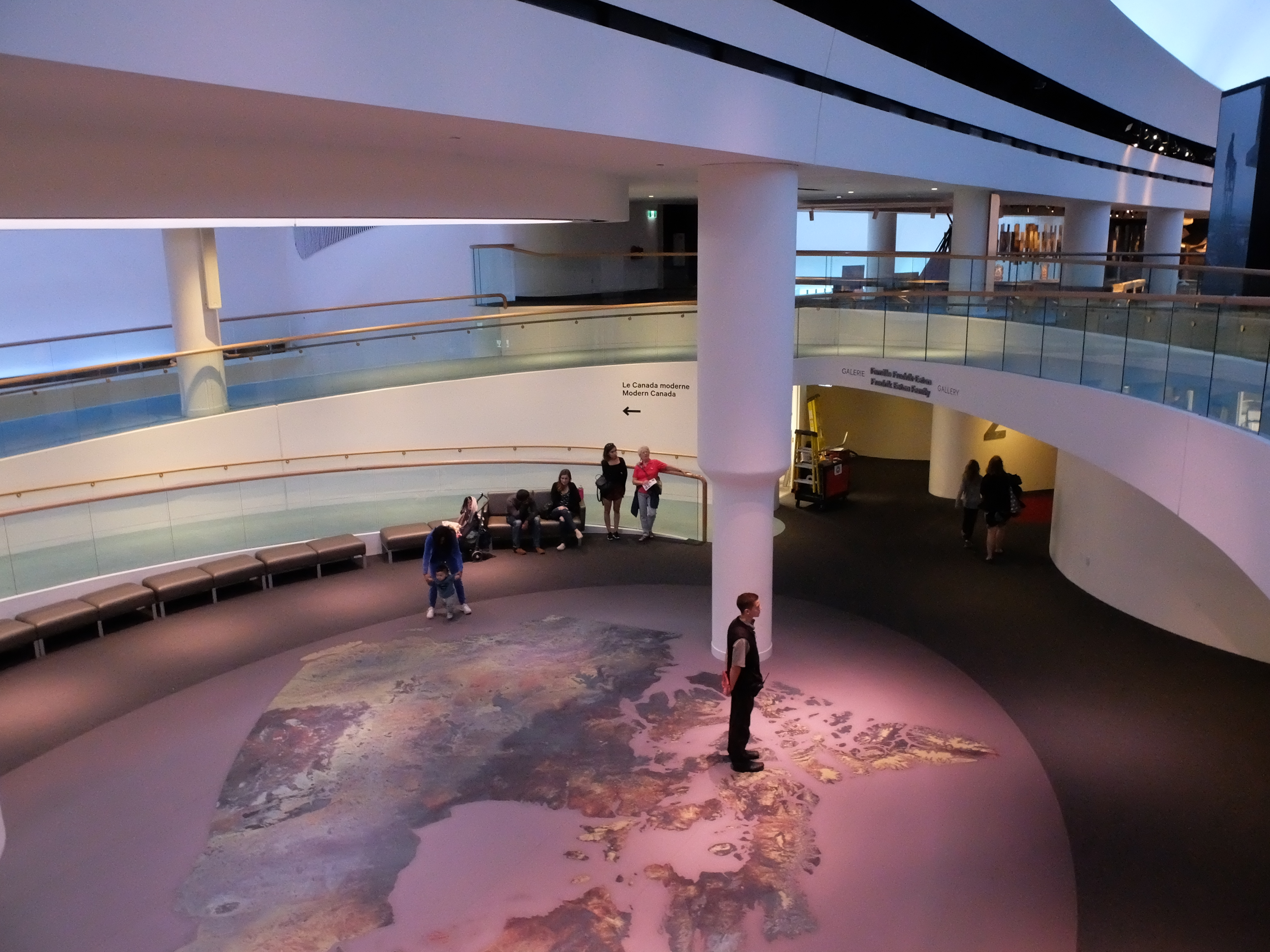
After leaving the Canadian capital of Ottawa, teams visited The Hub inside the Canadian Museum of History to take the Citizenship Test.

- Episode 6: "We Just Saw Johnny Mustard" (August 8, 2017)
- Prize: A five-city cross-Canada trip (awarded to Adam & Andrea)

Locations

- Bangkok (Siam@Siam Design Hotel Bangkok)
- Bangkok → Ottawa, Ontario
- Ottawa (Ottawa City Hall – Ottawa 2017 Cauldron)
- Ottawa (Hog's Back Falls)
- Ottawa (Royal Canadian Mounted Police Stables)
- Ottawa (Commissioners Park or Canada Council Art Bank)
- Ottawa (ByWard Market – BeaverTails)
- Gatineau, Quebec (Canadian Museum of History – Canadian History Hall)
- Gatineau (Canadian Museum of History – Upper Terrace)

Episode summary

- At the start of this leg, teams were instructed to fly to Ottawa, Ontario. Once there, they had to travel to Ottawa City Hall and search for the Ottawa 2017 Cauldron, where they received their next clue from Mayor Jim Watson. Teams then travelled to Hog's Back Falls, where they had to operate and arrange five red or white SUVs using the surround-vision technology such that they spelled out one of the letters in the word C-A-N-A-D-A in order to receive their next clue.
- In this leg's Roadblock, teams travelled to the Royal Canadian Mounted Police National Division facility and searched for the stables, where one team member had to suit up as an RCMP officer and properly groom a show horse. They then had to correctly attach tack and a saddle to the horse. Oonce approved by the supervising officer, they had to ride the horse into the practice arena and join the RCMP Musical Ride in order to receive their next clue.
- This leg's Detour was a choice between Tiptoe through the Tulips or Get the Picture. In Tiptoe through the Tulips, teams travelled to Commissioners Park, where they had to assemble a vendor cart for the Canadian Tulip Festival. Once built, they had to search the park for twelve buckets containing bouquets of tulips and arrange them to match the display on a completed sample cart in order to receive their next clue. In Get the Picture, teams travelled to the Canada Council Art Bank, where they had to use the computer database to find twenty specified artworks by matching serial numbers and, once found, photograph each one. Teams then had to place the photographs into a photo album in order to receive their next clue.
- Teams then travelled to the ByWard Market, where they found their next clue outside the BeaverTails restaurant, which directed them to the Canadian Museum of History in Gatineau, Quebec.
- In this leg's 150 Challenge, teams had to study the exhibits at the museum before making their way to the Canadian History Hall, where both teams members had to take the Canadian Citizenship Test and score at least 15 out of 20 in order to receive their next clue directing them to the upper terrace of the Canadian Museum of History, overlooking Parliament Hill on the Ontario side of the Ottawa River, which was the Pit Stop. There, teams reaffirmed their Canadian citizenship by taking the Oath of Citizenship in front of a citizenship judge.

Additional notes

- This leg featured a Double U-Turn. Sam & Paul chose to use the U-Turn on Kenneth & Ryan, while Korey & Ivana chose to use the U-Turn on Andrea & Ebonie.
- This was a non-elimination leg.

=== Leg 7 (Ontario → Newfoundland and Labrador) ===
The Detour and Speed Bump on this leg required teams to explore Gros Morne National Park, including Bonne Bay, on the western side of Newfoundland.

- Episode 7: "Break Time For Korey" (August 15, 2017)
- Prize: A trip for two to Rio de Janeiro, Brazil (awarded to Sam & Paul)
- Eliminated: Andrea & Ebonie

Locations

- Ottawa (Major's Hill Park)
- Ottawa → Deer Lake, Newfoundland and Labrador
- Corner Brook (Bank of Montreal)
- Woody Point (Gros Morne National Park – Discovery Centre)
- Corner Brook (Corner Brook Centre Bowl)
- Corner Brook (Swirsky's Theatre and Music Hall)
- Corner Brook (Captain James Cook Historic Site Lookout)

Episode summary

- At the start of this leg, teams were instructed to fly to Deer Lake on Newfoundland. Once there, teams had to travel to the Bank of Montreal branch in Corner Brook, where they received a tablet containing a video message from their loved ones, informing them of their next destination: the Discovery Centre in Gros Morne National Park.
- This leg's Detour was a choice between Find Your Dory or Family Story. In Find Your Dory, teams had to use four oars (two oars each) to row a dory around Bonne Bay and spot a lobster trap along the shore, which contained their next clue. After retrieving the clue, they had to row back to the starting point. In Family Story, teams travelled to a mock Viking camp and donned period costume. They had to listen to impersonators of three Norse Gods (Loki, Odin, and Thor) describe their ancestry and descendants, and then teams had to correctly fill in a family tree using stones carved with the given names in order to receive their next clue.
- For their Speed Bump, Andrea & Ebonie had to shoot arrows at a target until they earned a combined total of 25 points before they could continue racing.
- For the 150 Challenge and this season's first Face Off, teams travelled to Corner Brook Centre Bowl, where they competed against each other in a full ten-frame game of five-pin bowling. At the end of the game, the team with the higher score won the next clue, while the losing team had to wait for another opponent. The last team remaining at the Face Off had to turn over an hourglass and wait out a time penalty before moving on.
- In this leg's Roadblock, teams travelled to Swirsky's Theatre and Music Hall, where one team member had to choose and memorize twelve jokes from a list of fifty and successfully perform a stand-up comedy routine on stage in order to receive their next clue from comedian Trent McClellan. If they failed, they were pelted with fruits and vegetables by the audience and had to try again.
- After the Roadblock, teams had to check in at the Pit Stop: the Captain James Cook Historic Site lookout.

=== Leg 8 (Newfoundland and Labrador → Panama) ===
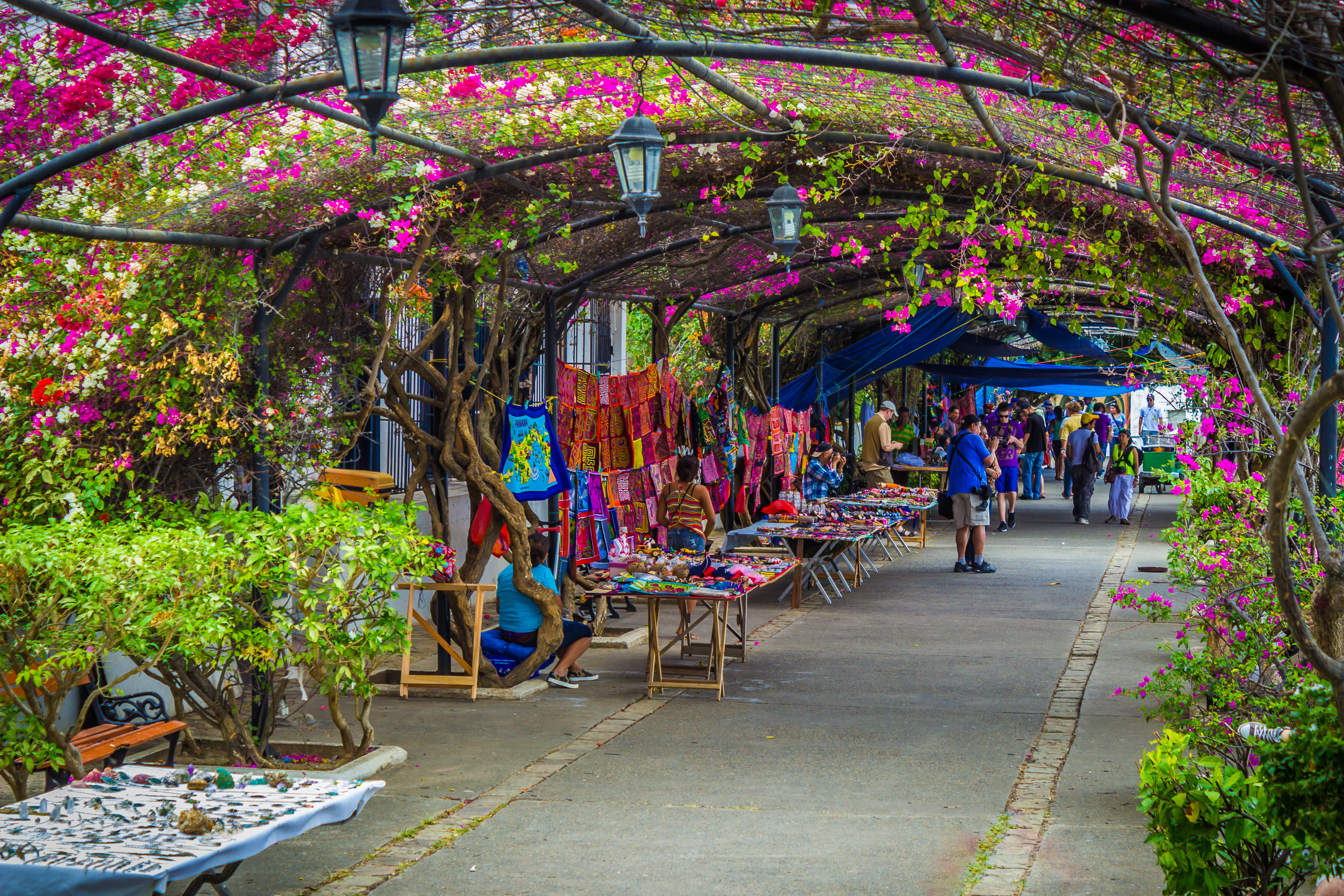
Paseo Esteban Huertas in Casco Viejo was the site of this leg's Roadblock, where racers had to remember molas, a traditional pattern used in Guna women's folk dress.

- Episode 8: "Can I See Your Kuna?" (August 22, 2017)
- Prize: A trip for two to New Orleans, Louisiana (awarded to Sam & Paul)

Locations

- Corner Brook (Corner Brook City Hall)
- Deer Lake → Panama City, Panama
- Panama City (Biomuseo)
- Panama City (Casco Viejo – Paseo Esteban Huertas)
- Panama City (Hotel Las Clementinas or Boxing Gym)
- Panama City (Sports Complex Escuela Dr. Belisario Porras)
- Panama City (Cinta Costera – Parador Fotográfico)

Episode summary

- At the start of this leg, teams were instructed to fly to Panama City, Panama. Once there, they had to travel to the Biomuseo, designed by Canadian architect Frank Gehry, and search the exhibits for the white wolf, where they found their next clue. Teams were directed to Paseo Esteban Huertas in Casco Viejo, where they had to search along the seawall for their next clue.
- In this leg's Roadblock, one team member had to choose and memorize an intricate mola pattern at a marked kiosk, and then search the streets and plazas of Casco Viejo for the one Guna woman among many who was wearing the matching pattern on their dress. Once they found the correct woman, they had to escort her back to the kiosk in order to receive their next clue.
- This leg's Detour was a choice between Up for a Drink or Down for the Count. In Up for a Drink, teams travelled to Hotel Las Clementinas, where they had to taste and identify five flavours of craft beer from a selection of fourteen listed ingredients, in order to receive their next clue. In Down for the Count, teams travelled to a boxing gym, where both team members had to learn six combinations of boxing moves, and then each get into the ring and perform all six in succession against a professional boxer in order to receive their next clue.
- After the Detour, teams found their next clue at the Sports Complex Escuela Dr. Belisario Porras. There, teams had to dress as drum majors and correctly lead the marching band, Banda de Música Virgilio Escala Colegio Pedro Pablo Sánchez, including a choreographed mace routine, in order to receive their next clue. Their clue was a photograph of Jon in front of a Panamá sign: the Pit Stop for this leg. Teams had to figure out that the sign was located at Parador Fotográfico on Cinta Costera. However, as there were two identical signs along the coast, they had to make note of background details in the photograph in order to determine which location was the correct one.

Additional note

- This was a non-elimination leg.

=== Leg 9 (Panama → Saskatchewan) ===
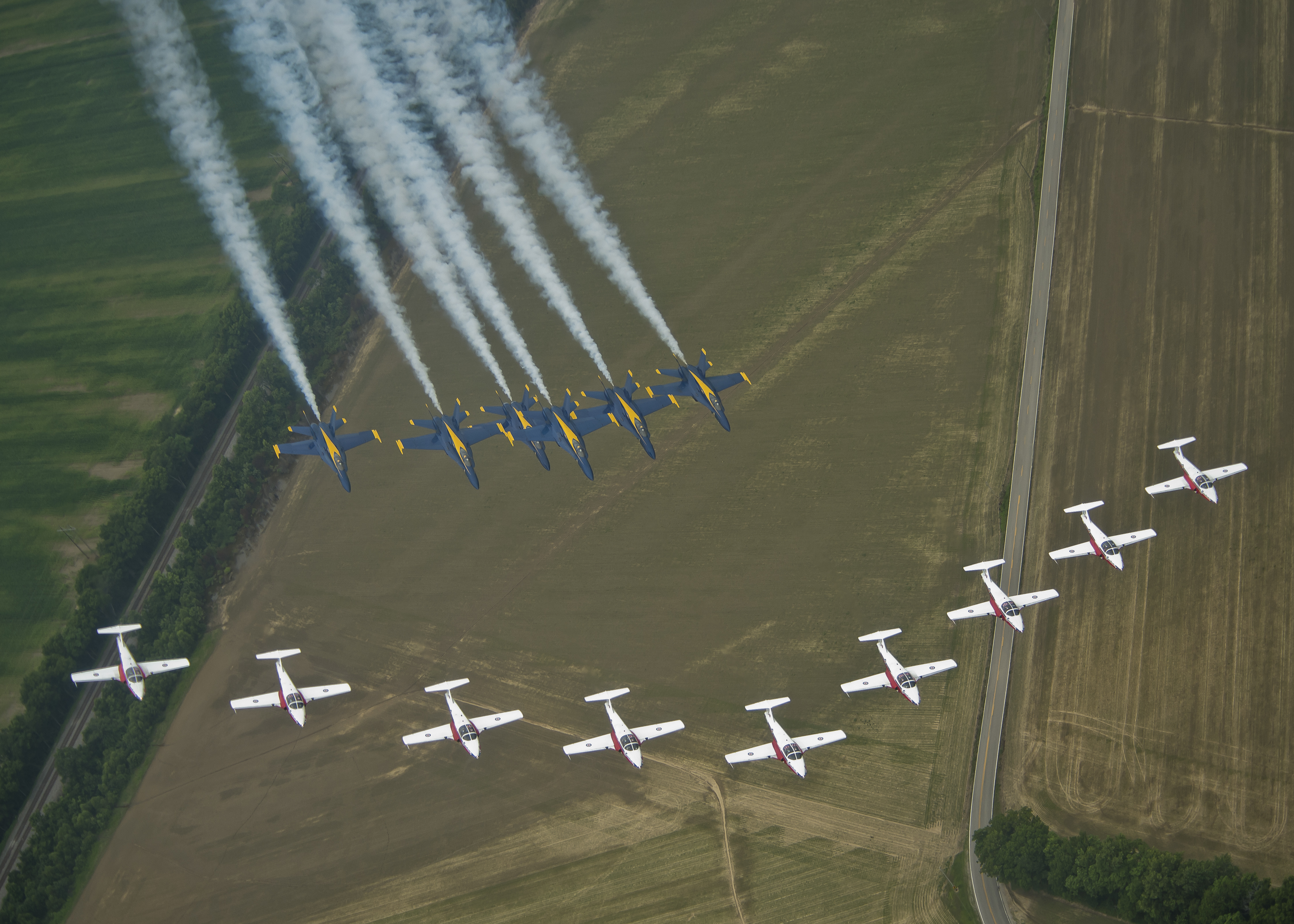
Teams ended this leg, run mostly in rural southern Saskatchewan, at 15 Wing Moose Jaw, the home base of the RCAF Snowbirds.

- Episode 9: "It's Like Finding Waldo In a Bunch of Waldos" (August 29, 2017)
- Prize: A trip for two to Costa Rica (awarded to Sam & Paul)
- Eliminated: Adam & Andrea

Locations

- Panama City (Panama Canal – Miraflores Locks)
- Panama City → Regina, Saskatchewan
- Regina (Douglas Park Elementary School)
- R.M. of Redburn No. 130 (Aulie Farms)
- Rouleau (Dog River Hotel)
- Moose Jaw (Crescent Park)
- Caron (Grandpa's Garden)
- Bushell Park (15 Wing Moose Jaw)

Episode summary

- At the start of this leg, teams were instructed to fly to Regina, Saskatchewan. Once there, teams travelled to Douglas Park Elementary School. As part of Bank of Montreal's Grant a Wish campaign, teams had to squeeze a full pitcher of orange juice from oranges and serve the juice to a lunchroom of children in order to receive their next clue. Teams then had to drive to Aulie Farms in order to find their next clue.
- For their Speed Bump, Karen & Bert had to use pitchforks to clean out manure-covered hay from a horse stall in the stable and then lay down fresh hay before they could continue racing.
- This leg's Detour was a choice between The Cart or The Horse. In The Cart (also a 150 Challenge), teams had to maneuver a self-propelled grain auger to a grain cart, shovel 1,000 pounds (450 kg) of canola seed into the auger's mouth, and then convey it into the grain cart in order to receive their next clue. In The Horse, teams had to lead an auction for a Clydesdale horse. One team member was the auctioneer, who had to memorize and recite the horse's story to bidders and call out asking prices, and their partner was the bid catcher, who had to relay bids to their partner both verbally and with hand signals. After selling a horse for C$6,000, teams received their next clue.
- At the Dog River Hotel in Rouleau, teams found their next clue, which directed them to Crescent Park in Moose Jaw. There, teams had to correctly arrange 250 cans of soup into a maple leaf shape following a photographed example in order to receive their next clue directing them to Grandpa's Garden.
- In this leg's Roadblock, one team member had to dress as a beekeeper, search the honeycombs of a hive of 20,000 honey bees for the queen bee, and correctly point her out to a judge in order to receive their next clue directing them to the Pit Stop at 15 Wing Moose Jaw, a Royal Canadian Air Force base, in Bushell Park.

Additional note

- This leg featured a Double U-Turn. Kenneth & Ryan chose to use the U-Turn on Sam & Paul, while Korey & Ivana chose to use the U-Turn on Adam & Andrea.

=== Leg 10 (Saskatchewan → Ontario) ===
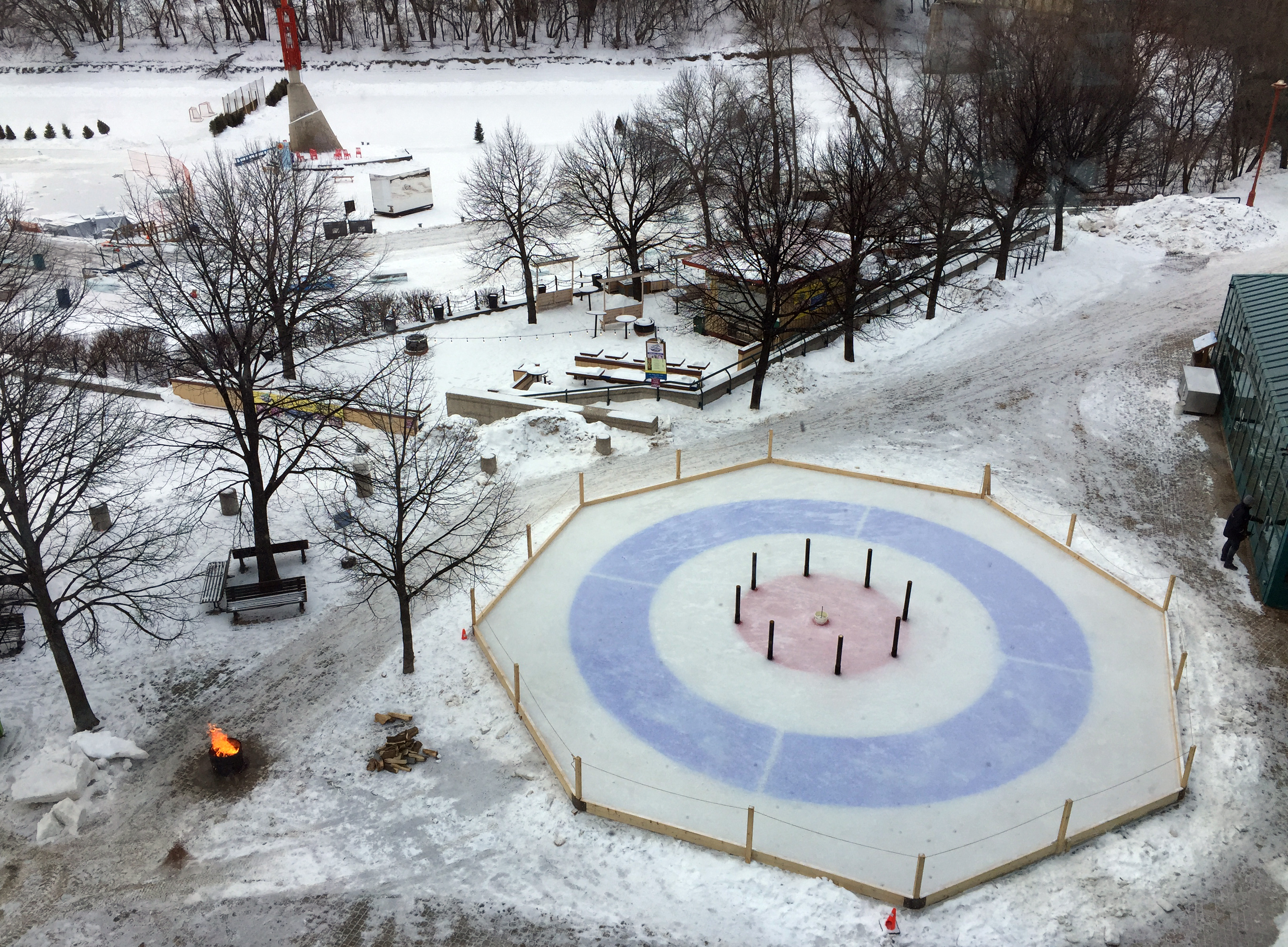
The final Face Off in this leg had teams participate in the game of Crokicurl, a combination of crokinole and curling.

- Episode 10: "They're Crawling On YOU!" (September 5, 2017)
- Prize: A trip for two to Cape Town, South Africa (awarded to Sam & Paul)
- Eliminated: Karen & Bert

Locations

- Regina (Victoria Park)
- Regina → Sault Ste. Marie, Ontario (Sault Ste. Marie Airport)
- Sault Ste. Marie (Agawa Canyon Railway)
- Sault Ste. Marie (Mockin'bird Hill Pioneer Farm or Kinsmen Park)
- Sault Ste. Marie (John Rhodes Community Centre)
- Sault Ste. Marie (Mill Market – Entomica Insectarium)
- Sault Ste. Marie (Bellevue Park – Topsail Island)

Episode summary

- At the start of this leg, teams were instructed to fly to Sault Ste. Marie, Ontario. Once there, teams had to search the airport parking lot for a marked vehicle, which contained their next clue.
- In this leg's 150 Challenge, teams drove to a designated rail crossing and boarded the Agawa Canyon tour train for a ride through the Algoma Highlands and Canyon. In one coach car, they found the titles and critiques of fourteen works by the Canadian artists known as the Group of Seven, and prints of the corresponding works in the next coach car. They had to memorize them and, in the front baggage car, correctly identify all fourteen in order to receive their next clue. However, teams had to complete the task within the 30 minute travel time; otherwise they had to remain on the train and wait for the round trip to complete before they could try again.
- This season's final Detour was a choice between Alpac-It or I'll Cast It. In Alpac-It, teams drove to the Mockin'bird Hill Pioneer Farm, where they had to successfully lead two alpacas through an obstacle course in a time of three minutes or less in order to receive their next clue. In I'll Cast It, teams drove to Kinsmen Park, donned hip waders, and entered Kinsmen Lake, where each team member had to cast their fly fishing rod and hit three floating targets in order to receive their next clue.
- For this season's second and final Face Off, teams drove to the John Rhodes Community Centre pool. On a circular curling sheet, teams competed against each other in Crokicurl: a cross between curling and the board game crokinole. The team who arrived first had the choice of taking their turn first or second. Each team member took turns throwing six curling stones, attempting to knock out their opponent's stones while keeping theirs in place, in order to score the most points. After all stones are thrown, the team with the higher score received their next clue. The last team remaining at the Face Off had to turn over an hourglass and wait out a time penalty before moving on.
- In this leg's Roadblock, teams drove to Entomica Insectarium. The team member who did not choose to perform the Roadblock had to insert their head into a plexiglass box, at which point numerous live giant cockroaches were dropped on them. Their partner then had to count the correct number of each of four distinct species in order to receive their next clue directing them to the Pit Stop: Bellevue Park on Topsail Island.

=== Leg 11 (Ontario → Quebec) ===
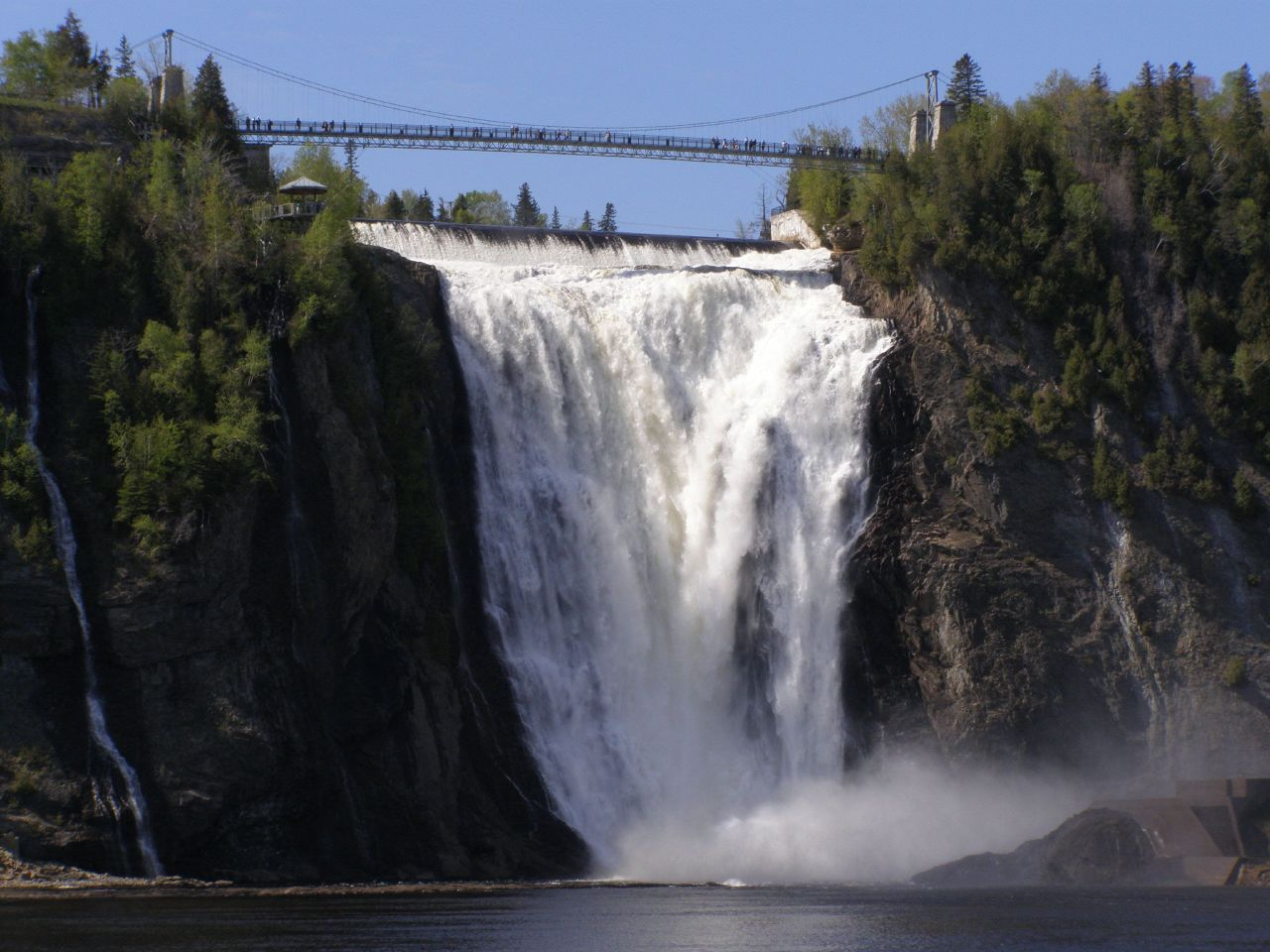
The penultimate Roadblock in Quebec City required one team member to climb down a cargo net suspended from the pedestrian bridge over Montmorency Falls.

- Episode 11: "Canada's Coming Together Like a Piece of Cake" (September 12, 2017)
- Prizes: A C$250,000 cash payout, a trip for two around the world, and a 2018 Chevrolet Equinox for each team member (awarded to Sam & Paul)
- Winners: Sam & Paul
- Runners-up: Kenneth & Ryan
- Third place: Korey & Ivana

Locations

- Sault Ste. Marie (Sault Ste. Marie Boardwalk)
- Sault Ste. Marie → Quebec City, Quebec (Québec City Jean Lesage International Airport)
- Quebec City (Montmorency Falls)
- Quebec City (Saint-Roch – Place de Bordeaux)
- Quebec City (Quebec Winter Carnival Warehouse)
- Quebec City (Le Musée du Chocolat Érico)
- Quebec City (Édifice Marie-Guyart – Observatoire de la Capitale)
- Quebec City (Morrin Centre)
- Sainte-Famille-de-l'Île-d'Orléans (Parc des Ancêtres)

Episode summary

- At the start of this leg, teams were instructed to fly to Quebec City, Quebec. Once there, teams had to search outside the airport for their next clue, which was near the control tower.
- In this leg's first Roadblock, one team member had to climb down a cargo net suspended from the pedestrian bridge over Montmorency Falls in order to retrieve their next clue, and then climb back up to reunite with their partner.
- At the Place de Bordeaux plaza in the Saint-Roch neighbourhood, teams had to choose a cycle rickshaw with one team member serving as the driver and the other as the dispatcher. Using only a list of locations, a map with street names and places written in French, and walkie-talkies, the dispatcher had to give the driver directions through the streets of Old Quebec in order to pick up three passengers and transport them to their proper destination, at which point, each passenger gave a colour-coded card to the driver. After returning to the Place de Bordeaux with all three cards, teams received their next clue.
- At the storage warehouse of the Quebec Winter Carnival, teams had to search through numerous figures of Bonhomme, the snowman mascot of the festival, in order to find their next clue, which was a box of chocolates from Érico Chocolatier wrapped in a yellow and red ribbon. Once teams arrived at Le Musée du Chocolat Érico, they could exchange the box for a giant chocolate egg, which they had to break open in order to find their next clue.
- In this season's final Roadblock, the team member who did not perform the previous Roadblock had to pull themselves up the side of the 31-storey Édifice Marie-Guyart to the rooftop. Once at the top, they had to search the city and spot a yellow and red Amazing Race flag on the roof of their next destination, the Morrin Centre, and then take the elevator down to reunite with their partner.
- At the Morrin Centre, teams found a bag of puzzle pieces that formed a large map of Canada, and ten cards referencing challenges throughout the season, six of which were the 150 Challenges. Once the puzzle was fully assembled in a frame, teams then had to place only the six correct 150 Challenge cards over the city in which the challenges took place in order to receive their final clue, which directed them to the finish line at the Parc des Ancêtres on the Island of Orléans.

Leg	Location	Task
1	Vancouver, British Columbia	Tightrope
2	Fort McMurray, Alberta	Pump It
6	Gatineau, Quebec	Canadian Citizenship Test
7	Corner Brook, Newfoundland and Labrador	Five-pin bowling
9	Regina, Saskatchewan	Canola
10	Sault Ste Marie, Ontario	Group of Seven

== Ratings ==
Viewership includes initial date of viewing plus seven day DVR playback.

No.	Title	Air date	Viewers (millions)	Weekly rank	Ref.
1	"Who Wants to Be the Python?"	July 4, 2017	1.89	1	
2	"You've Got to Leave My Hose Alone, Dude!"	July 11, 2017	1.61	2	
3	"It's Like Ducks In the Forest"	July 18, 2017	1.78	2	
4	"This Is a Butt Workout"	July 25, 2017	1.68	2	
5	"This Is a Real Cat and Mouse Chase"	August 1, 2017	1.83	1	
6	"We Just Saw Johnny Mustard"	August 8, 2017	1.90	1	
7	"Break Time For Korey"	August 15, 2017	1.61	1	
8	"Can I See Your Kuna?"	August 22, 2017	1.63	2	
9	"It's Like Finding Waldo In a Bunch of Waldos"	August 29, 2017	1.70	1	
10	"They're Crawling On You"	September 5, 2017	1.72	1	
11	"Canada's Coming Together Like a Piece of Cake"	September 12, 2017	1.96	1	
