= Consensual citizenship =

Consensual citizenship is based on the mutual acceptance of the community by individual citizens. The idea is largely attributed to John Locke. It is an alternative to birthright citizenship. Peter H. Schuck and Rogers Smith addressed the idea in a 1985 book, Citizenship without Consent.

== Consensual citizenship in the birthright debate ==
Debate over citizenship rules in the United States restarted in the mid-1990s, when the idea of anchor babies emerged. The term expressed the idea that US law allowed non-citizen immigrants to use the existence of offspring born in the US to justify immigration for other relatives. This led to proposed legislation to define offspring as citizens of the country of their parents' citizenship. Consensual citizenship is an alternative to both regimes. One approach requires children to declare their intentions to be citizens once they reach a certain age.

== See also ==
- Citizenship test
