= Entomica Insectarium =

Canadian insectarium

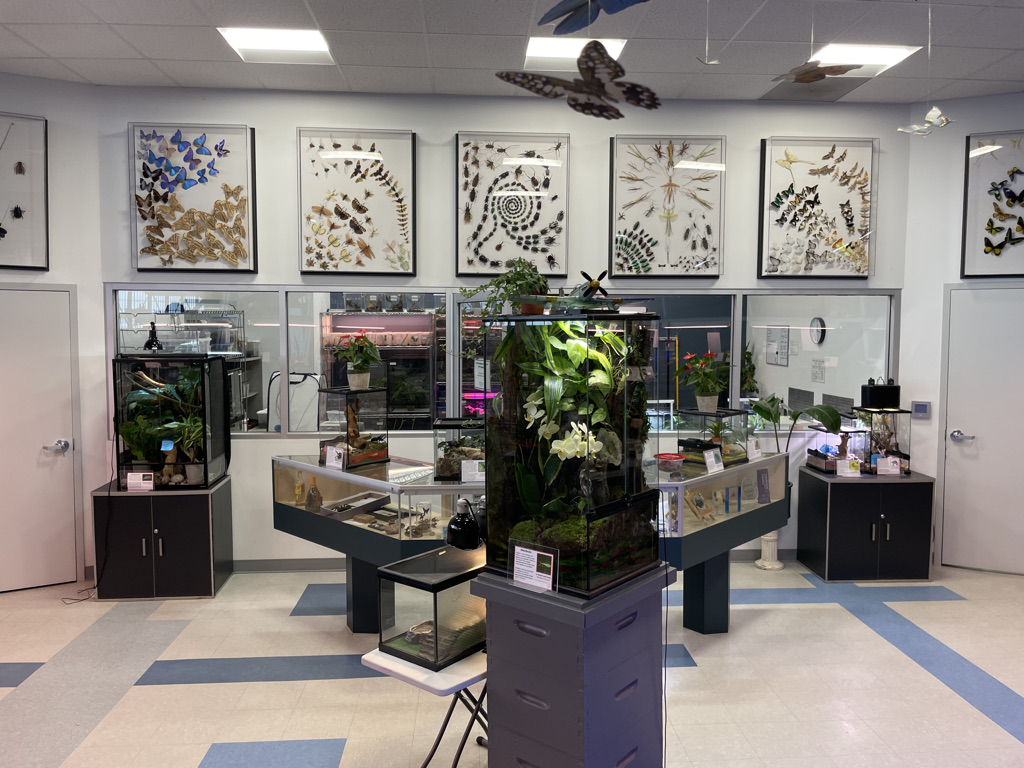
- Interactive map of Entomica Insectarium
- 46.5047°N 84.3239°W
- Date opened: 2014
- Location: 50 Pim Street, Sault Ste. Marie, Ontario
- Website: www.entomica.com

Entomica Insectarium is an insectarium and natural history museum located in Sault Ste. Marie, Ontario. First established in the Mill Market in 2014, Entomica is now located inside the Canadian Bushplane Heritage Centre.

Entomica Insectarium is a charitable organization, and the first insectarium in Canada to be federally-approved to move their exotic insects off-site. As such, they have been delivering hands-on programs to schools, outreach programs, retirement residences and community events. Entomica received funding from the Ontario government, through the provincial Community Building Fund to build their online outreach activities. They have collaborated with local and regional partners, including the Art Gallery of Algoma, Clean North, Ermatinger Clergue National Historic Site, the Great Lakes Forestry Centre, the Ontario Forest Research Institute, Outspoken Brewery, and Science North.

In 2007, Entomica and its bugs were invited to the Earth Day Weekend at the Royal Ontario Museum in Toronto. Entomica has been involved with Science North for the Sault Ste. Marie Science Festival since 2017, and in 2022, brought their insects and arachnids across Northern Ontario alongside the Great Northern Ontario Roadshow.

Entomica Insectarium was host to The Amazing Race Canada 5, with contestants subjected to the 'Cockroach Cranium', where multiple species of cockroaches were dropped on contestants' heads in a Plexiglass enclosure.

The Canadian Bushplane Heritage Centre took a larger role in the operation of the museum in 2024.

== Exhibits ==
Entomica Insectarium has many insects and arachnids, as well as amphibians, reptiles, and freshwater and saltwater fishes.

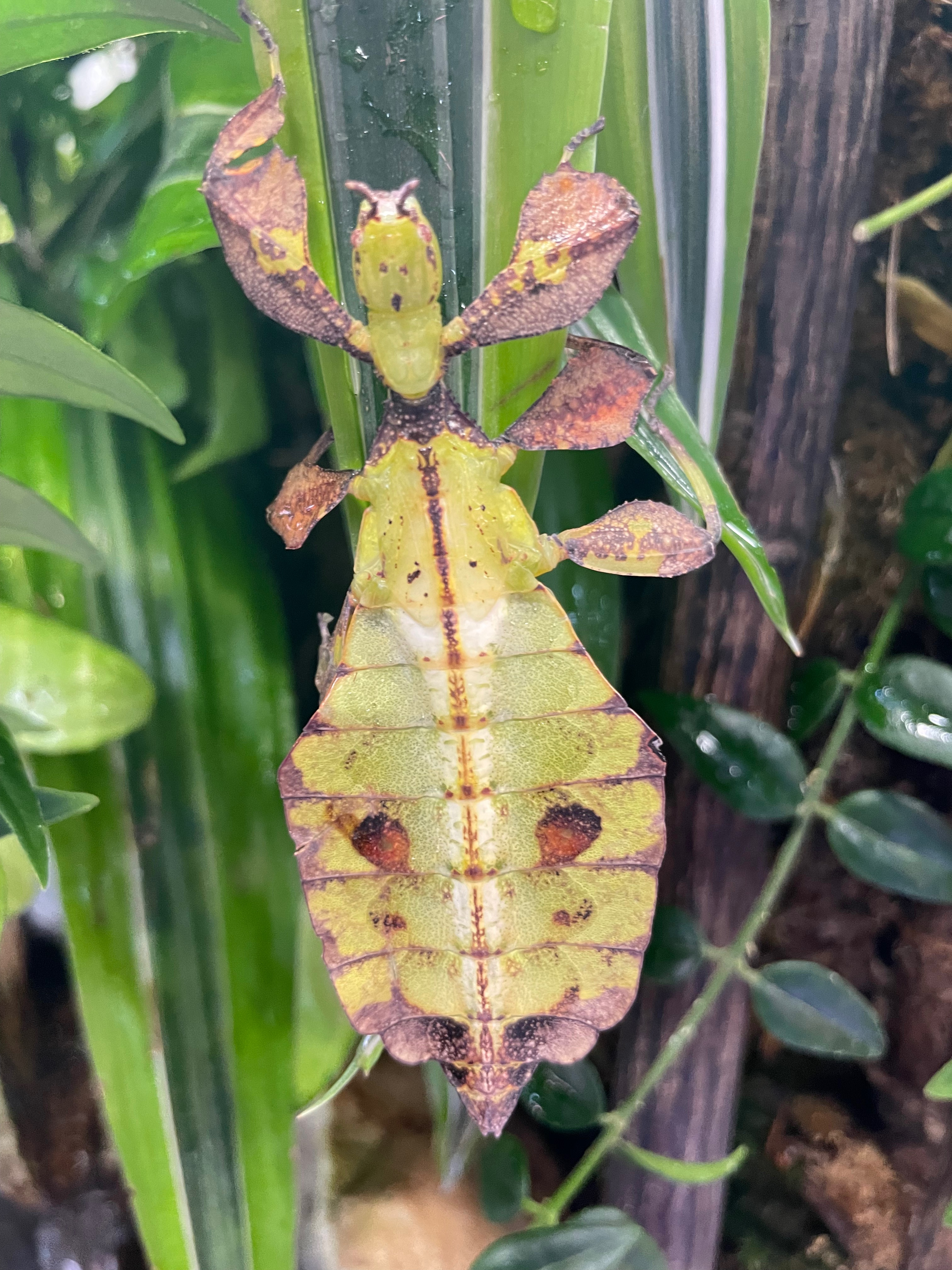
Leaf insect

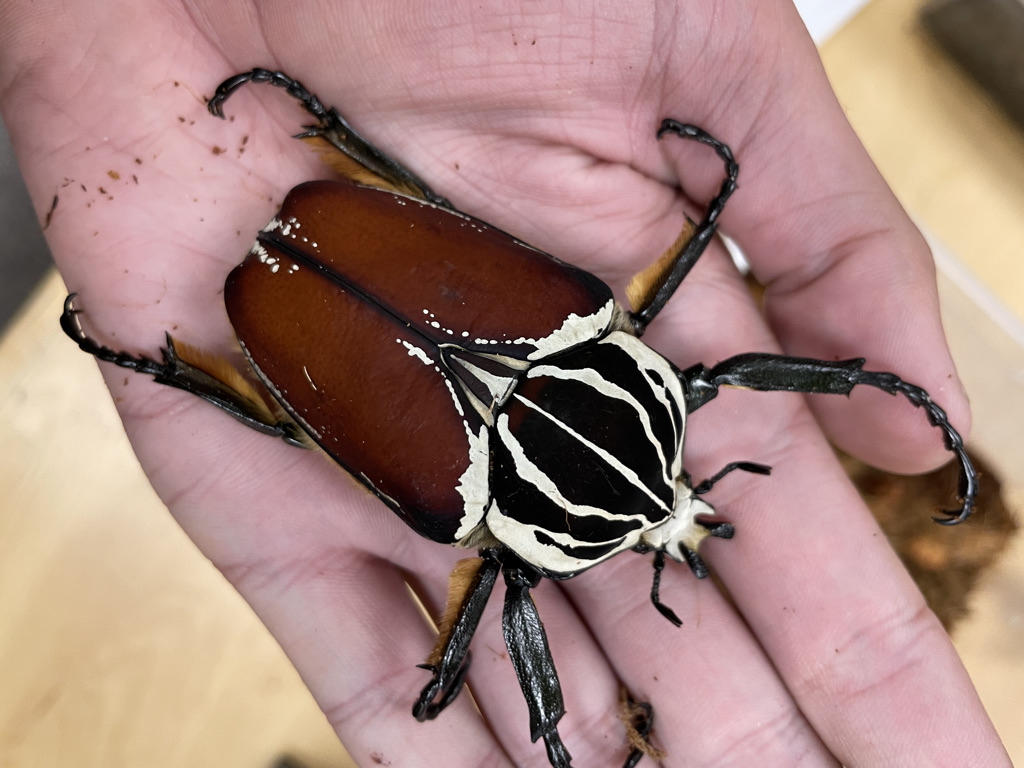
Goliath beetle

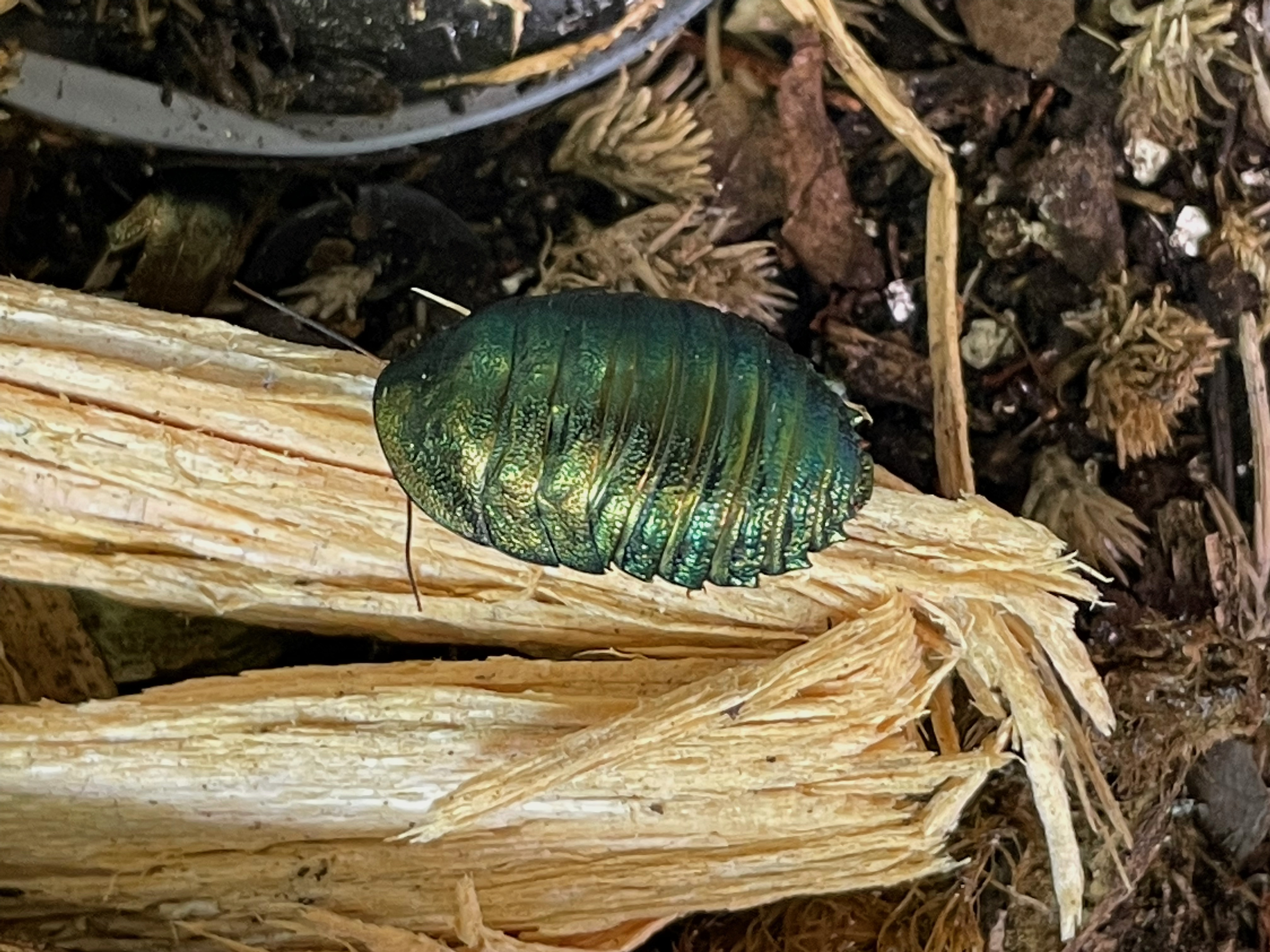
Emerald cockroach

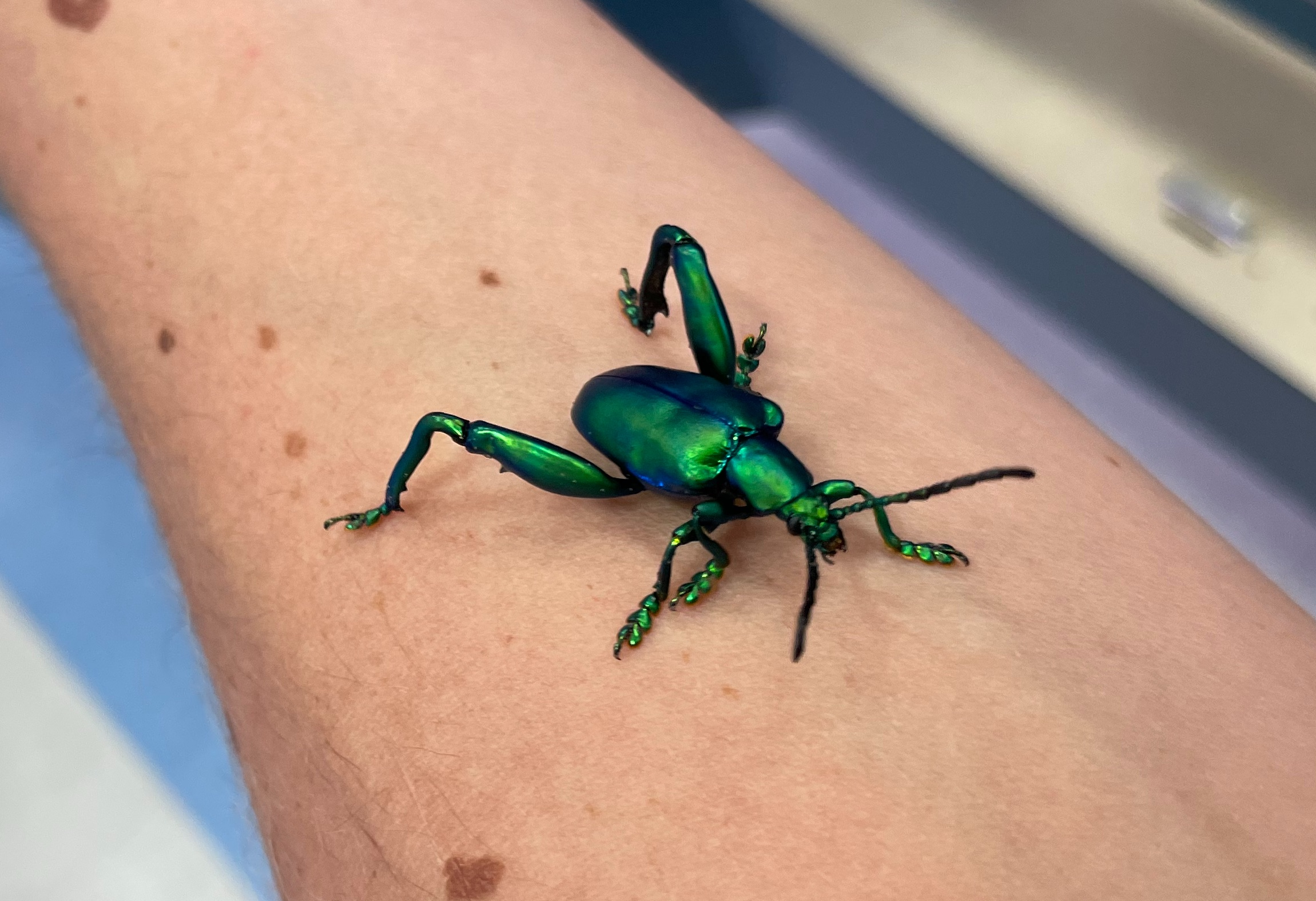
Frog-legged beetle

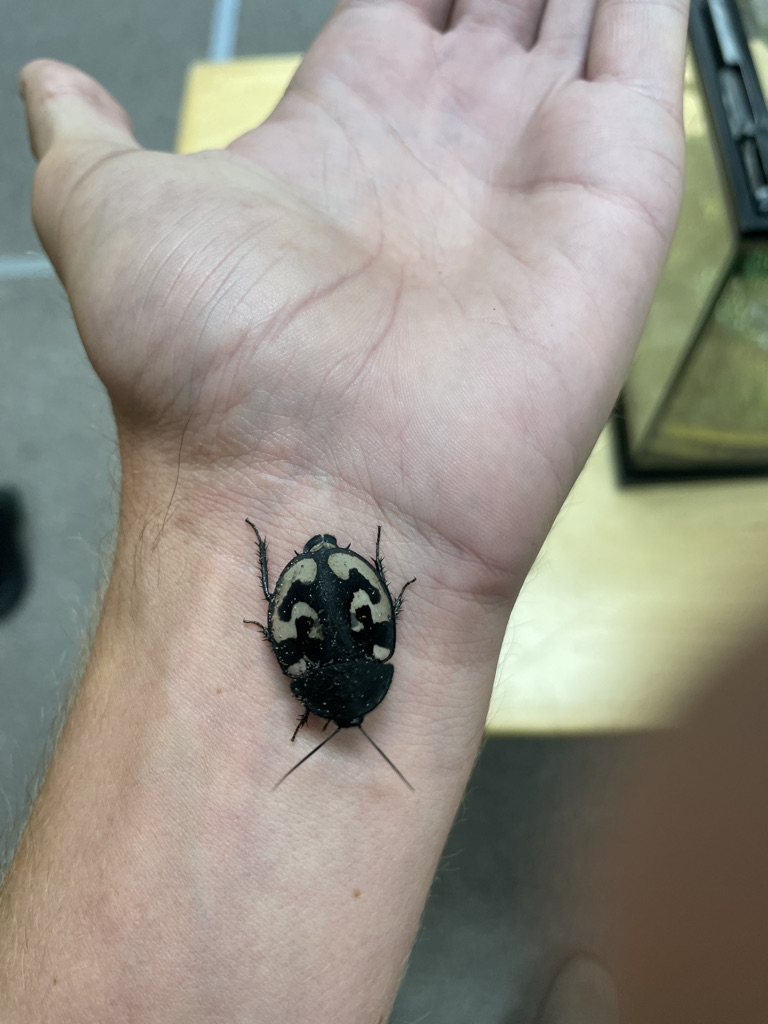
Question mark cockroach

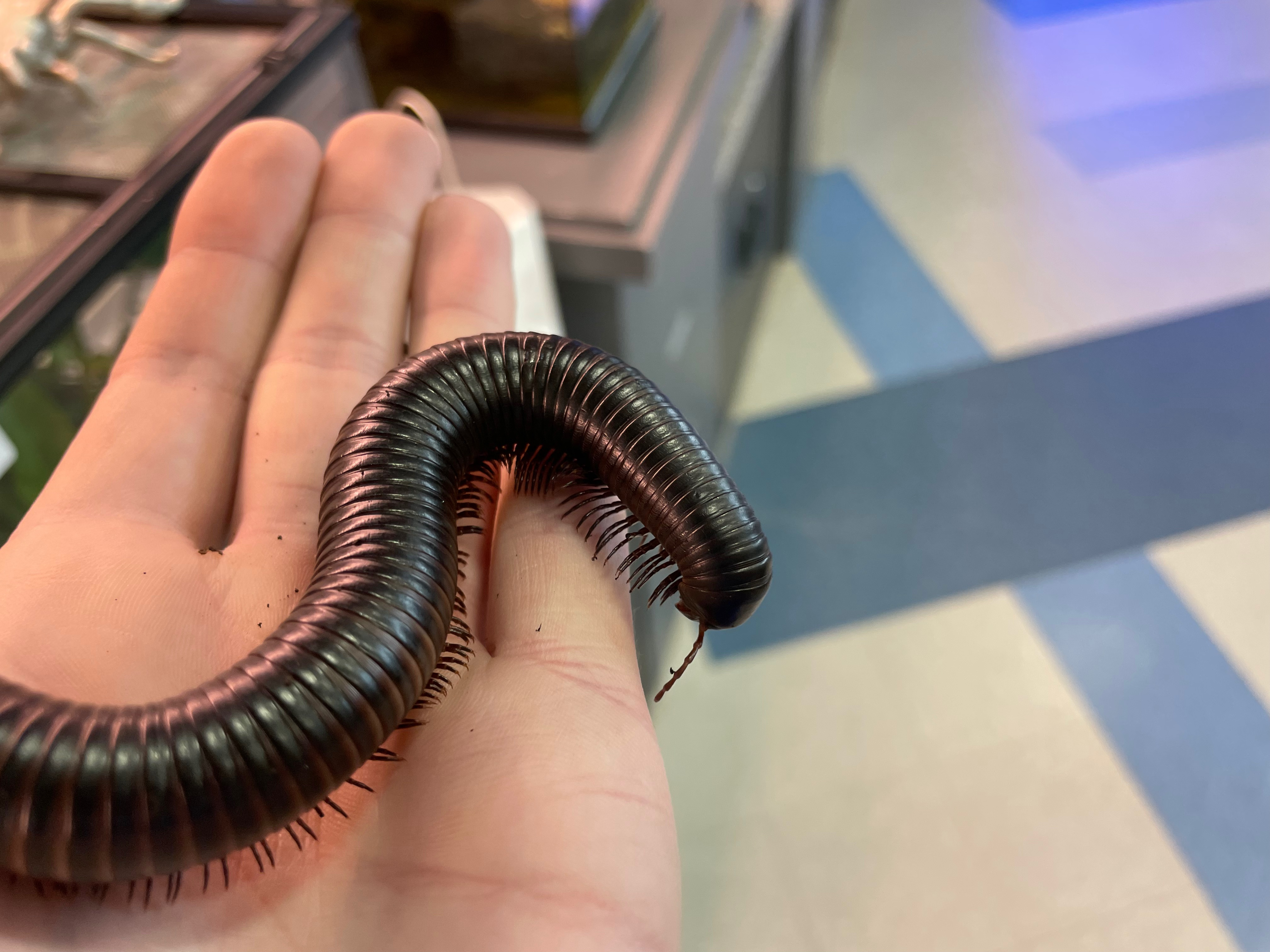
Giant African millipede

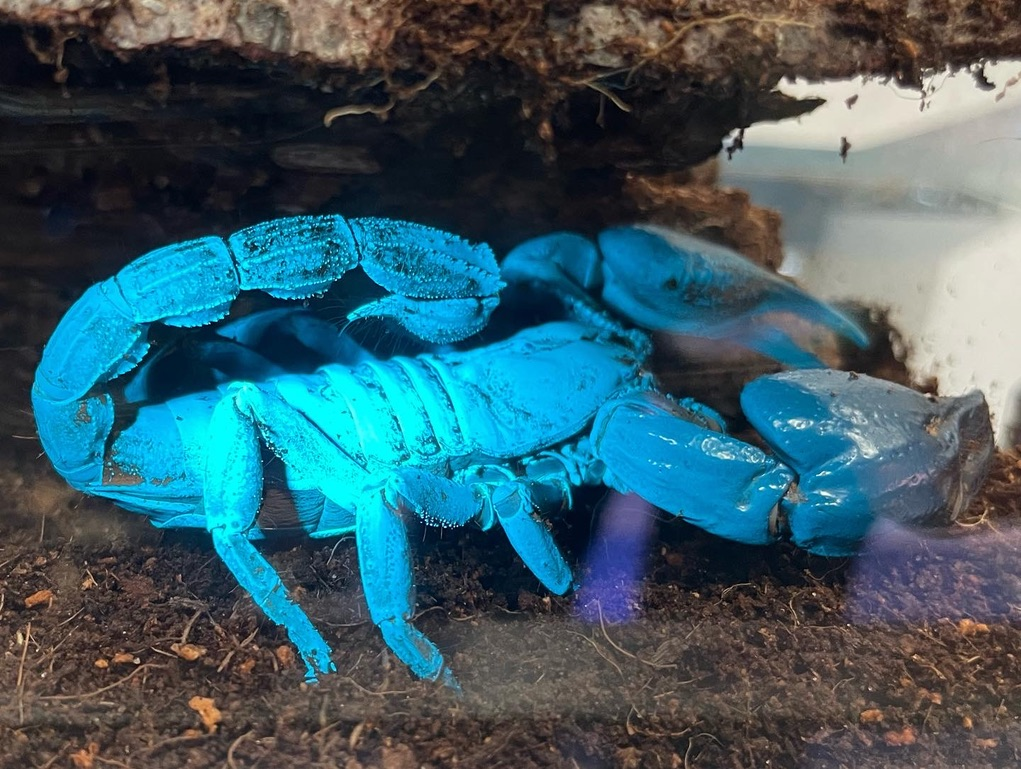
Asian forest scorpion, under blacklight

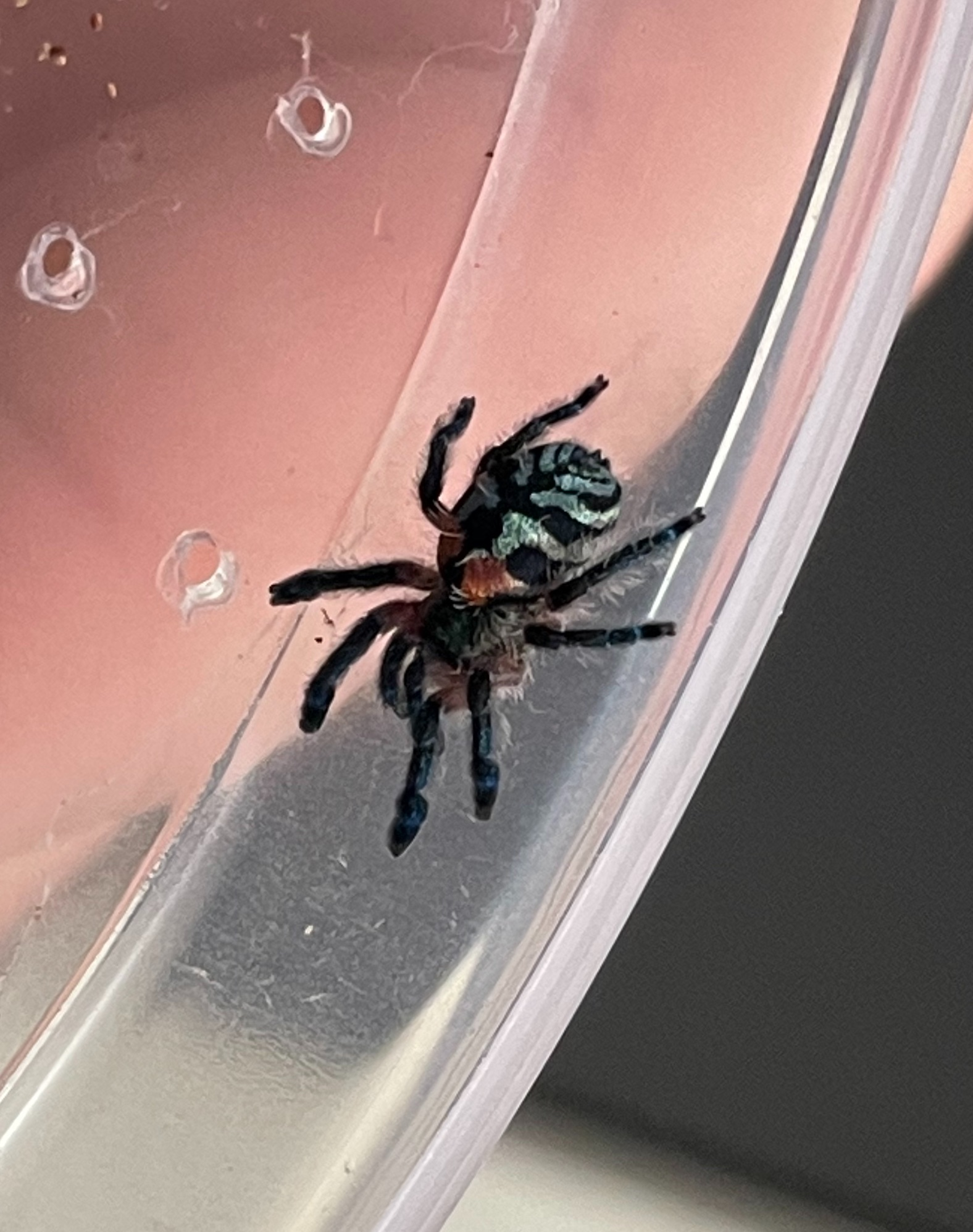
Brazilian jewel tarantula

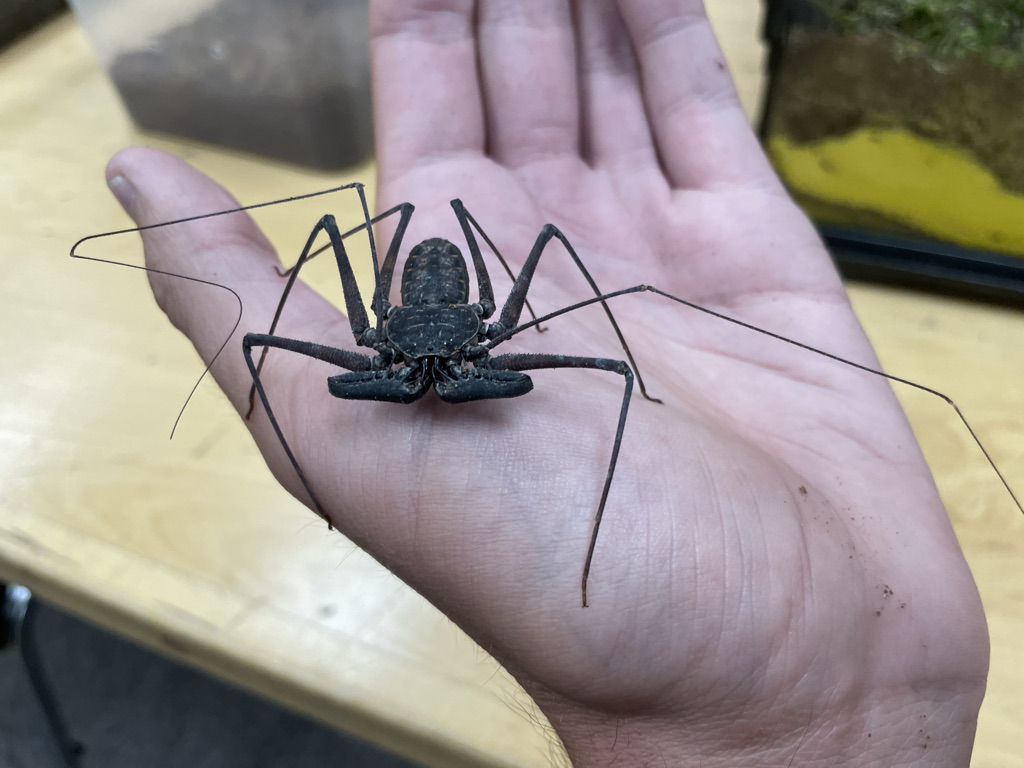
Tailless whip scorpion

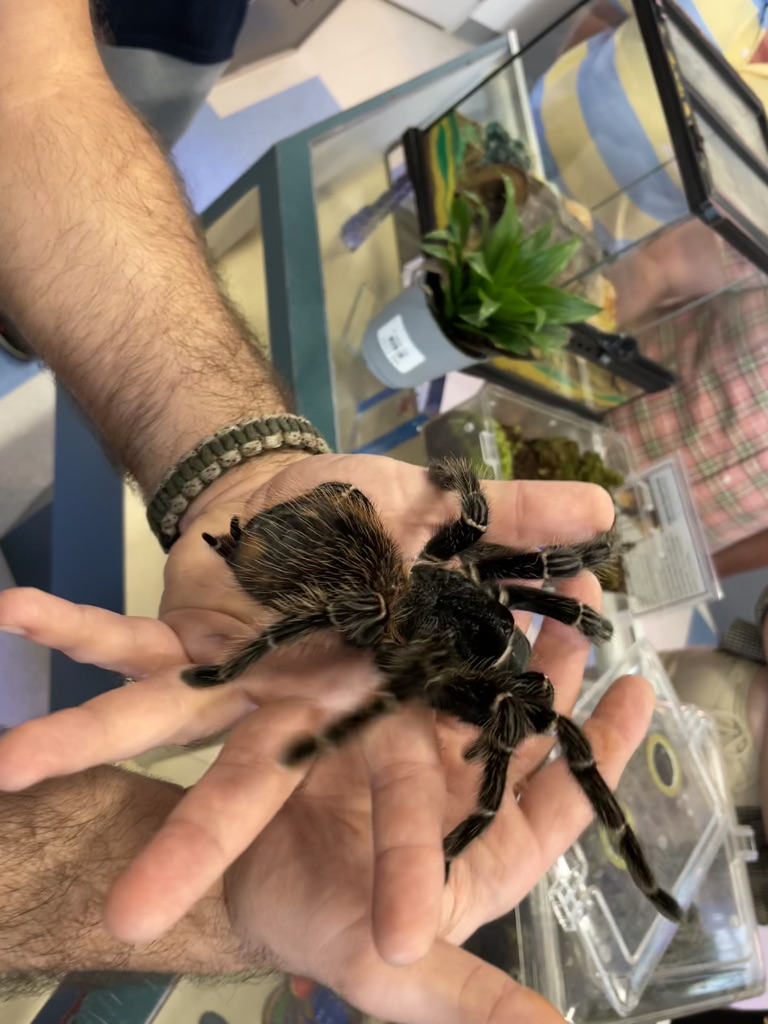
Brazilian salmon pink bird-eating tarantula

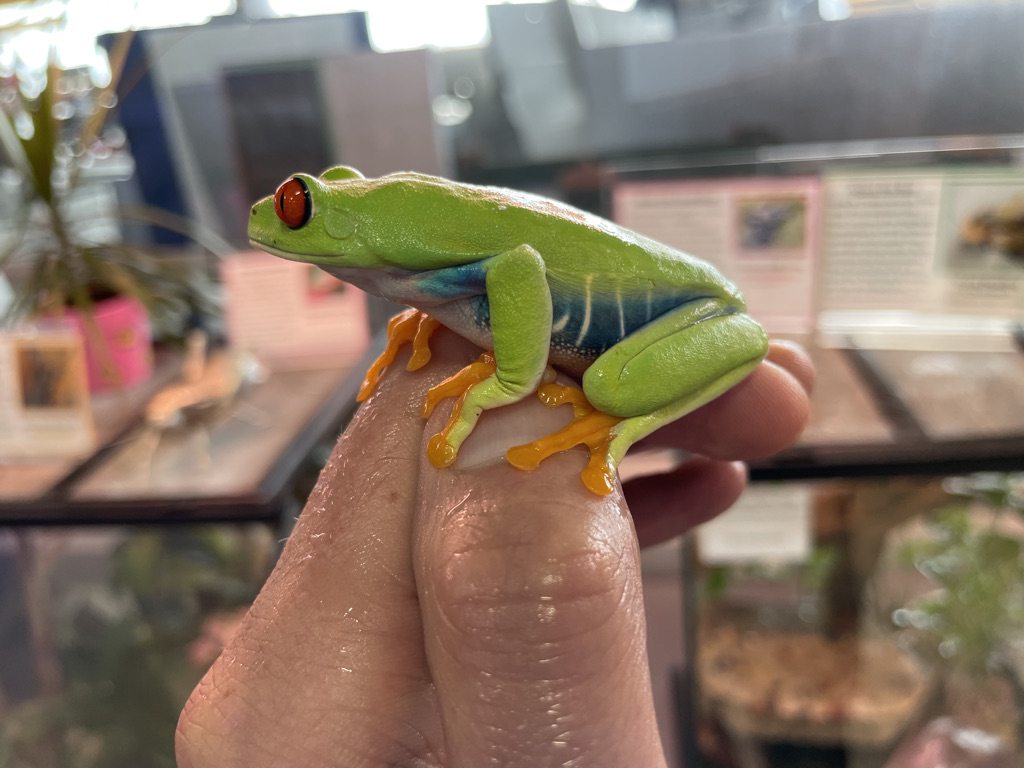
Red-eyed tree frog

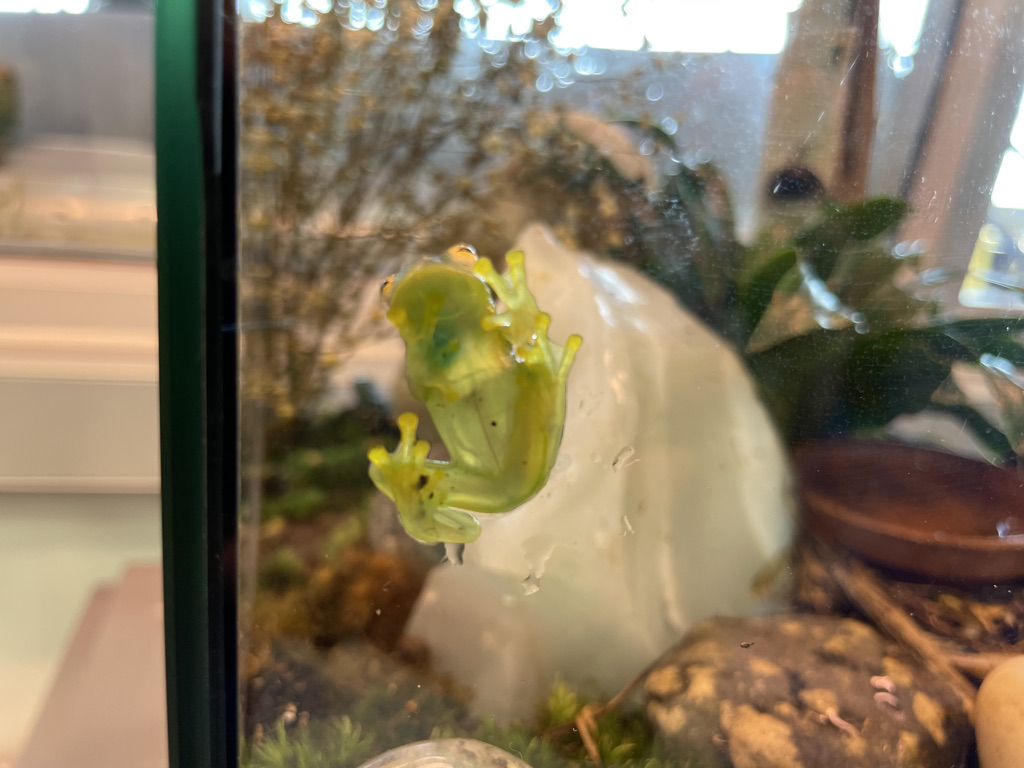
Powdered glass frog

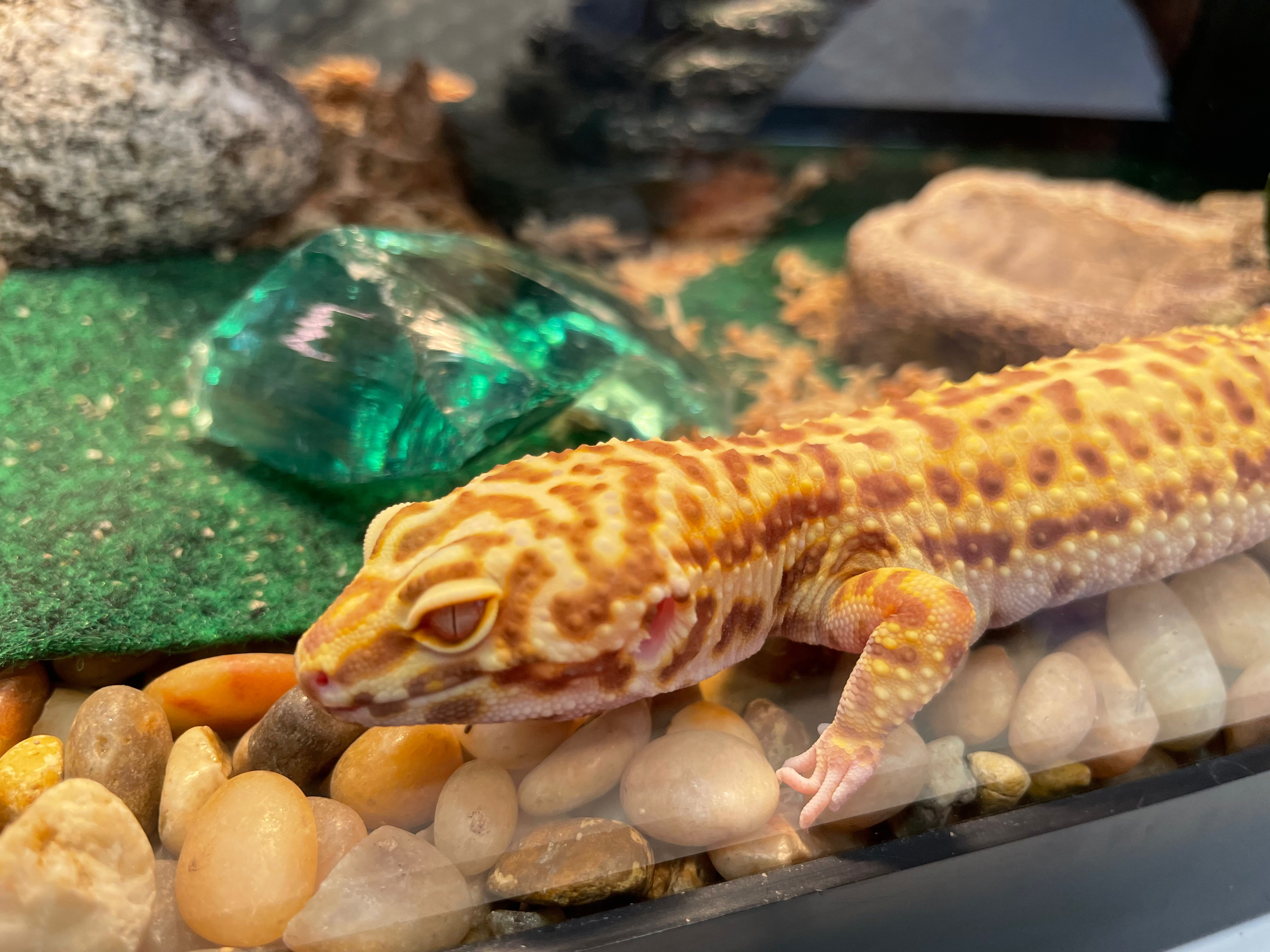
Leopard gecko

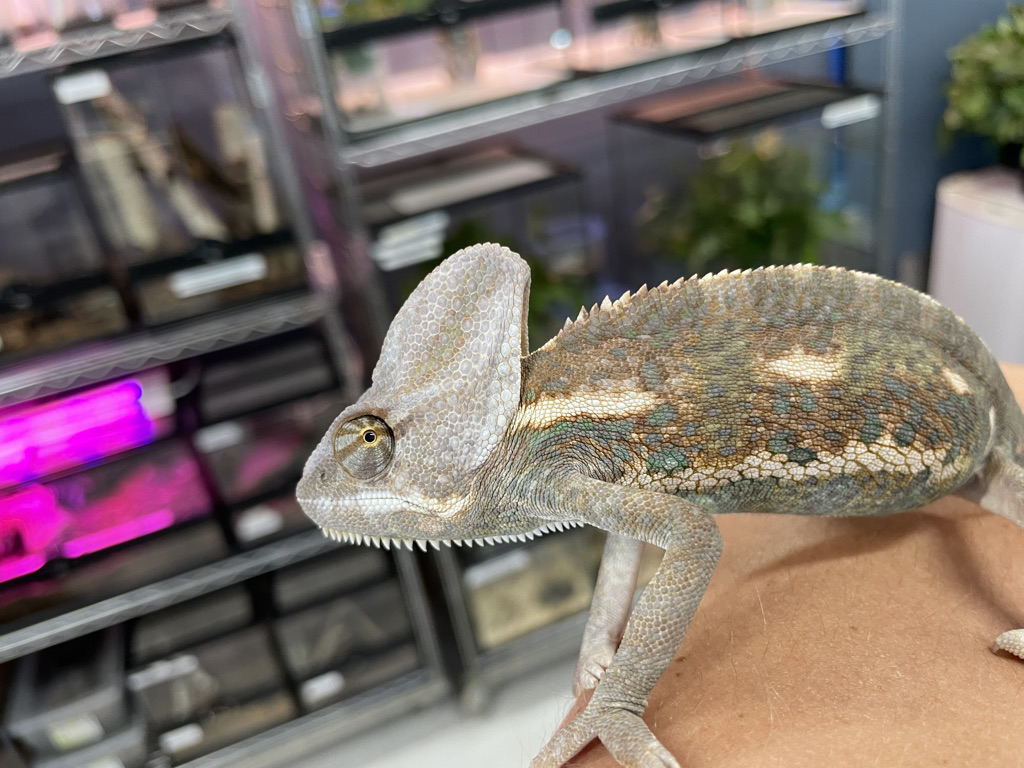
Veiled chameleon

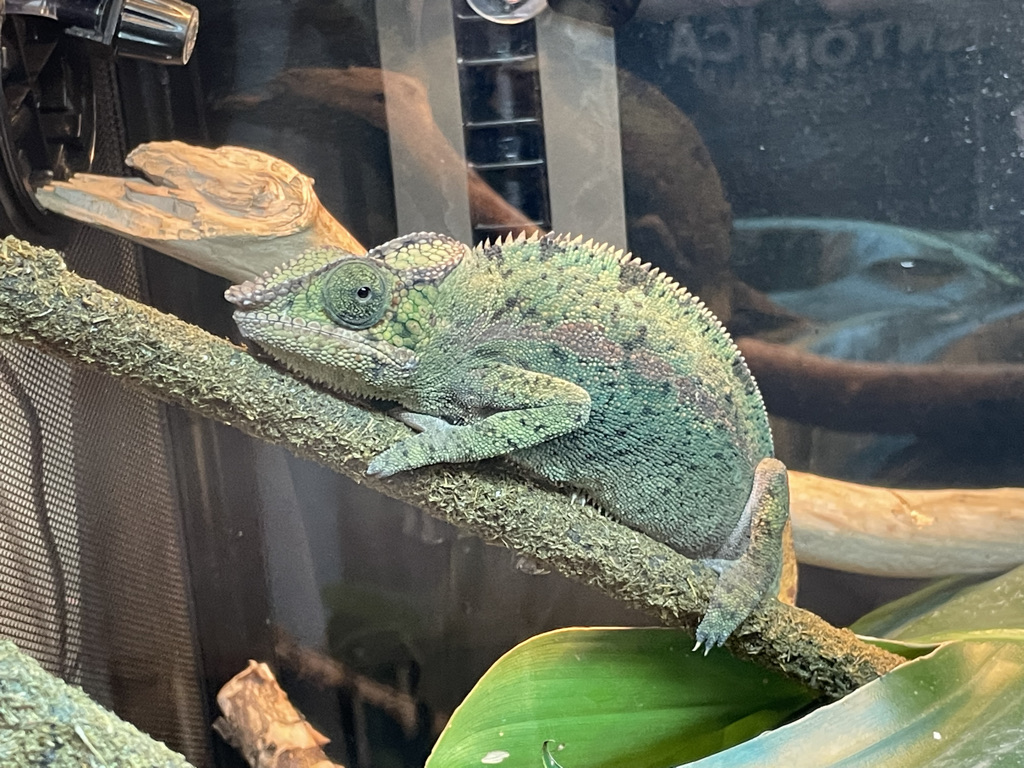
Panther chameleon

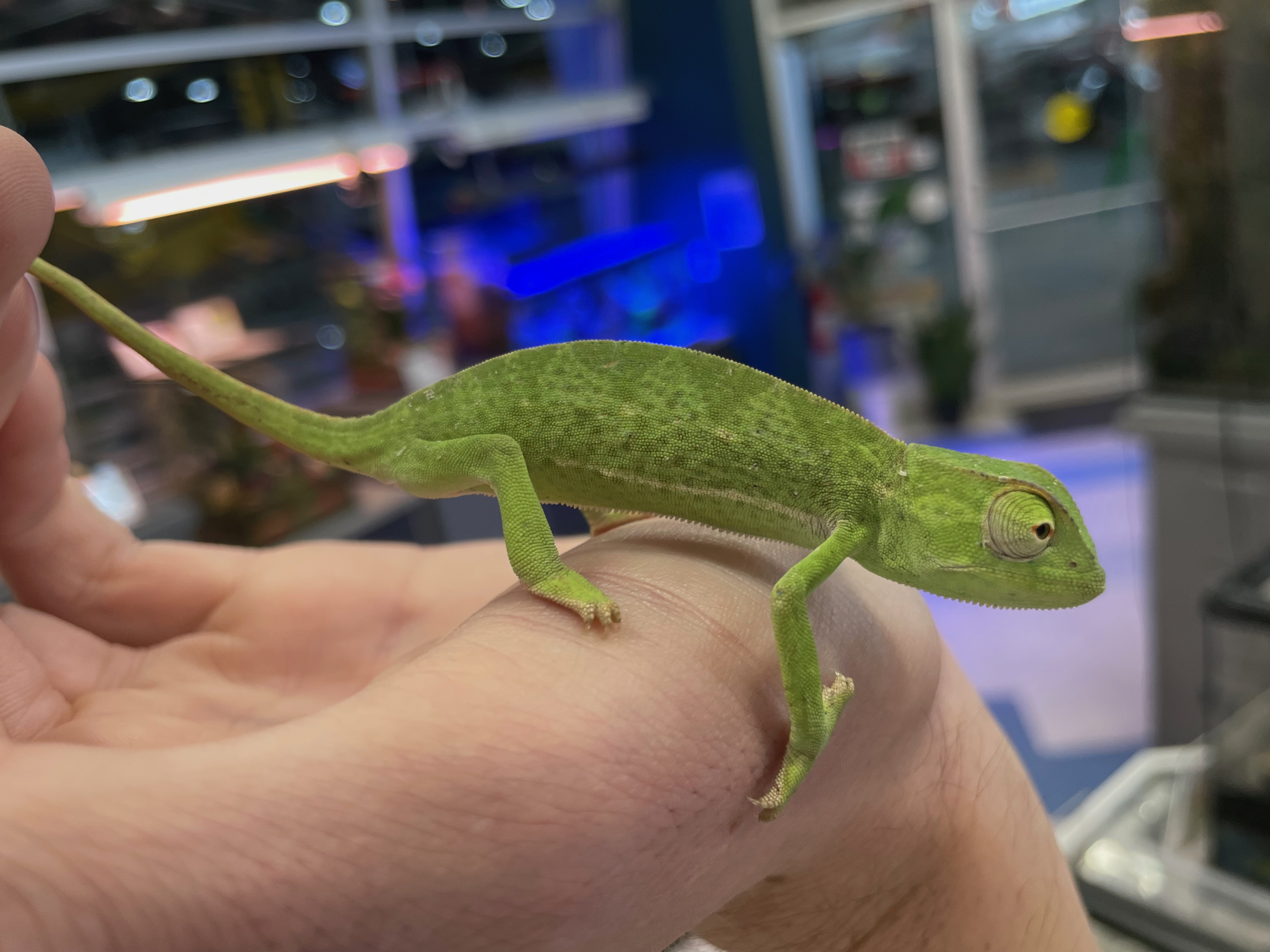
Senegal chameleon

== Awards ==
Entomica Insectarium has been awarded a number of awards for its work, including a “Making a Difference” Award and "CASCADE for Best Program – Small Institution" award for its Science for Seniors program from the Canadian Association of Science Centres. They were also awarded the 2019 Tourism Ambassador Award from Tourism Sault Ste. Marie, and the Sault Ste. Marie Innovation Centre's 2016 SSMARt Innovation Award in Social Entrepreneurship.
