= Canadian Citizenship Test =

Test administered to applicants for Canadian citizenship

The Canadian Citizenship Test is a citizenship test conducted by the Immigration, Refugees and Citizenship Canada (IRCC), that is required for all applicants for Canadian citizenship who are aged between 18 and 54 and who meet the basic requirements for citizenship. The test is available in both French and English, the official languages of Canada.

The test is usually written, but in some cases it might be oral and take place in the form of an interview with a citizenship officer. The IRCC decides if the applicant's test is written or oral, depending on their various criteria.

== The test ==
The test lasts for 45 minutes and contains 20 true or false or multiple choice questions. Applicants for citizenship must answer at least 15 (75%) questions correctly to pass the test. Applicants must be in Canada when taking the test and must take the test within 30 days. Applicants have three opportunities to pass the test.

=== Content of the test ===
The test contains questions drawn from a pool of around 500 that are reviewed and revised regularly. The test is based on the content of the official guide "Discover Canada (The Rights and Responsibilities of Citizenship)". The test asks questions on the following subject matters:

- Rights and responsibilities of a Canadian citizen - (e.g. "Name three legal rights protected by the Canadian Charter of Rights and Freedoms.")
- Canadian history - (e.g. "Who were the United Empire Loyalists?")
- Canadian political systems - (e.g. "How are members of Parliament chosen?")
- Canadian physical and political geography - (e.g. "Where are the Parliament buildings located?")
- Specific questions about the applicant's region - (e.g. "What is the name of the premier of your province or territory?")

The test also assesses language abilities. To pass the test, the applicant must understand simple statements and questions and communicate simple information to CIC staff in either French or English.

On March 15, 2010, a new and more thorough test was introduced. This test is based on a longer 63-page guide called Discover Canada. This gives immigrants a richer picture on Canada's history, culture, law and politics. At the same time, immigrants are required to memorize more facts for the test. Canadian values, such as democracy, gender equality, and human rights, are much more emphasized in this new edition. Canada's native roots and population are also much better portrayed. That test was revised and re-introduced on October 14, 2010, to reduce the new test's unacceptably high failure rate.

== Failure rate ==
The failure rate on the citizenship test has been low until recently; in 2008, approximately 4% of the 145,000 test takers failed.

However, the failure rate for the new citizenship test is much higher. When it was first introduced on March 15, 2010, the failure rate rose to 30%. Later on, a reworked version of the test introduced on October 14, 2010, brought the national failure rate down to around 20%, but the rate was still significantly higher than that of the old test.

== After passing ==
When the applicant meets the standard of 15 correct answers and it is determined that the applicant meets all requirements for citizenship, the applicant is invited to attend a citizenship ceremony within six months.

The applicant is required to swear or affirm an oath and is presented with a Citizenship Certificate.

== After failing ==
An applicant who fails to meet the standard is scheduled to retake the multiple-choice written test. If they fail again, they must have a 15 to 20 minute interview with a citizenship officer. The officer asks the applicant 20 questions that may be multiple choice, true or false, or question and answer. The officer assesses whether the applicant has correctly answered 15 questions and demonstrated the necessary knowledge to be granted citizenship. In 2008, approximately 20% of the interviewees were refused citizenship.

== See also ==
- Canadians
- Immigration to Canada
- Canadian nationality law
