= WildPlay Element Parks =

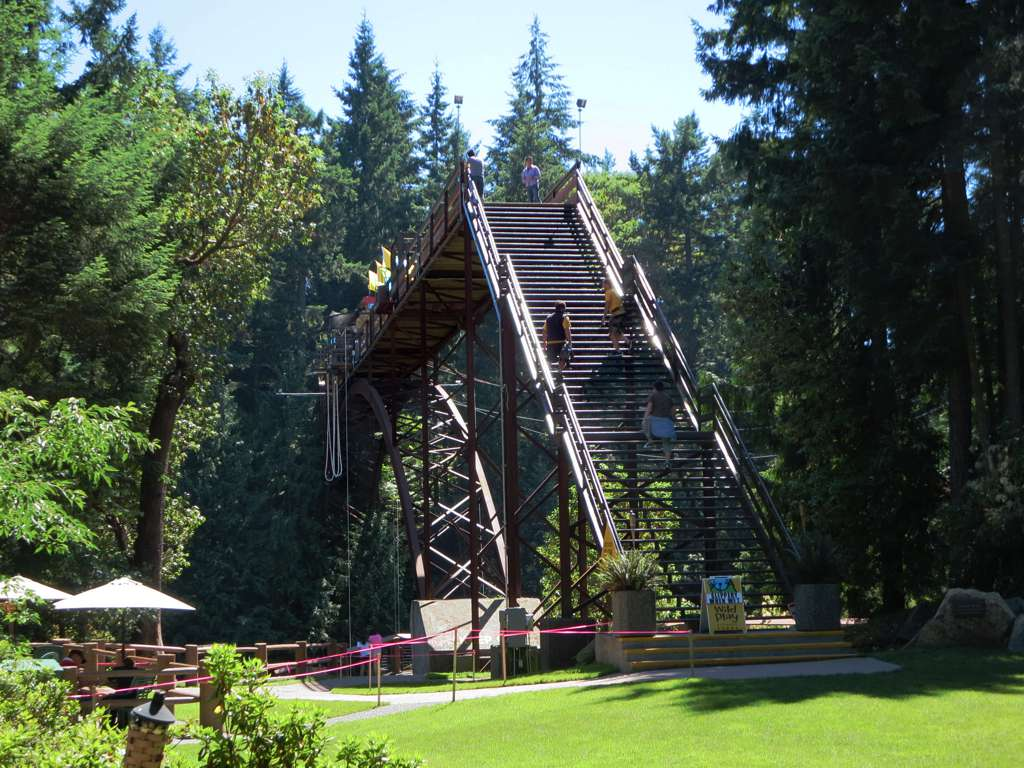
- Type: Outdoor Recreation Park chain
- Location: British Columbia, Ontario, and New York State
- Created: March 2006
- Status: Parks close for season during winter months
- Website: Official website

WildPlay Element Parks is a Canadian-owned chain of outdoor recreation parks located across British Columbia, Ontario and New York. It is based on Vancouver Island. WildPlay's first park was opened south of Nanaimo, British Columbia in March 2006 where the company operates North America's first legal, purpose-made bungee jumping bridge. The bridge stands 150 feet (46 m) above the Nanaimo River; over 260,000 people have jumped since the site opened in 1990. The Nanaimo location hosts naked bungee jumping once a year as a fundraiser. Besides bungee jumping, WildPlay parks are made up of treetop activities involving high-ropes and obstacle climbing, swinging, and ziplining. WildPlay is located in Victoria, Maple Ridge, Nanaimo, Niagara Falls, Ontario, Jones Beach State Park and John Boyd Thacher State Park in New York.
