= Citizenship test =

Examination required to become a citizen

A citizenship test is an examination, written or oral, required to achieve citizenship in a country. It can be a follow up to fulfilling other requirements such as spending a certain amount of time in the country to qualify for applying for citizenship.

Some North American countries where they exist are the United States and Canada. Among European countries, written citizenship tests are in place in the UK, Netherlands, Austria, Denmark, Estonia, Germany, Latvia, and Lithuania. Oral citizenship tests are used in Spain, Greece and Hungary.

== History ==
The practice of testing individuals as part of the naturalization process began in the United States in the late 1880s as a literacy test.

In 2017 a lifelong resident of Switzerland made headlines after failing her citizenship test. The United States citizenship test increased from 10 to 20 questions on December 1, 2020 (with 12 correct answers required to pass) and involved more conservative philosophy, more advanced English, and less simple geography than the previous test which had remained unchanged since 2008. According to a 2018 survey by the Institute for Citizens & Scholars, less than one third of Americans could pass a multiple choice citizenship test, with the majority of respondents failing to choose the correct number of Supreme Court justices and the opponents of the United States in World War II.

=== Australia ===
The Australian citizenship test consists of 20 multiple-choice questions, 15 of which must be answered correctly to pass, and has been in place since 2007. It is only available in English, and it is required of applicants between 18 and 59. Australian naturalization can occur with either the standard 45-minute examination, a combination of a 90-minute examination with consultation) and a prior completion of a 400-hour English course, or as part of a citizenship course (required for applicants that fail three citizenship examinations). After the written test, applicants do a face-to-face interview with an Australian Immigration and Border Protection officer.

=== Germany ===
The German citizenship test is required of German nationality applicants age 16 or older who did not attend German school or German higher education in law or social, political, or administrative sciences. It has 33 questions including three questions specific to the German state where the applicant lives. The time limit is 60 minutes. The minimum number of correct answers is 17, and a repeat test is permitted for those who fail. The German government reports that more than 90% of applicants pass.

== Examples ==
- American Civics Test
- Australian citizenship test
- Canadian Citizenship Test
- Citizenship of the United States
- Life in the United Kingdom test
- Integration law for immigrants to the Netherlands
