= The Amazing Race Canada 12 =

Season of television series

- Season 12
- Presented by: Jon Montgomery
- No. of teams: 10
- Winners: Tina & Liz Liao
- No. of legs: 10
- Distance traveled: 12,000 km (7,500 mi)
- No. of episodes: 10

Release
- Original network: CTV
- Original release: July 7 – September 15, 2026

Additional information
- Filming dates: April 20 – May 15, 2026

Series chronology
- ← Previous; Season 11

The Amazing Race Canada 12 is the twelfth season of The Amazing Race Canada, a Canadian reality competition show based on the American series The Amazing Race. Hosted by Jon Montgomery, it featured ten teams of two, each with a pre-existing relationship, competing in a race across Canada. The grand prize includes a CA$250,000 cash payout and a trip around the world. Filming took place from April 20 to May 15, 2026. This season visited seven provinces, travelling approximately 12,000 kilometres (7,500 mi) during ten legs. Starting in Whistler, racers travelled through British Columbia, Alberta, Quebec, Ontario, Nova Scotia, New Brunswick, and Manitoba before finishing in Calgary. New elements introduced in this season include every team receiving an Express Pass at the start of the race, the Intersection, and a U-Turn penalty vote for a non-eliminated team. Elements of the show that returned for this season include a double elimination leg and a final leg with three teams. The season premiered on CTV on July 7, 2026, and concluded on September 15, 2026.

Twin sisters Tina and Liz Liao were the winners of this season, while married couple Eamon Fitzgerald and Rebecca "Bec" Moroney were the runners-up, and brothers Michele and Matteo Bruzzese finished in third place.

== Production ==
=== Development and filming ===
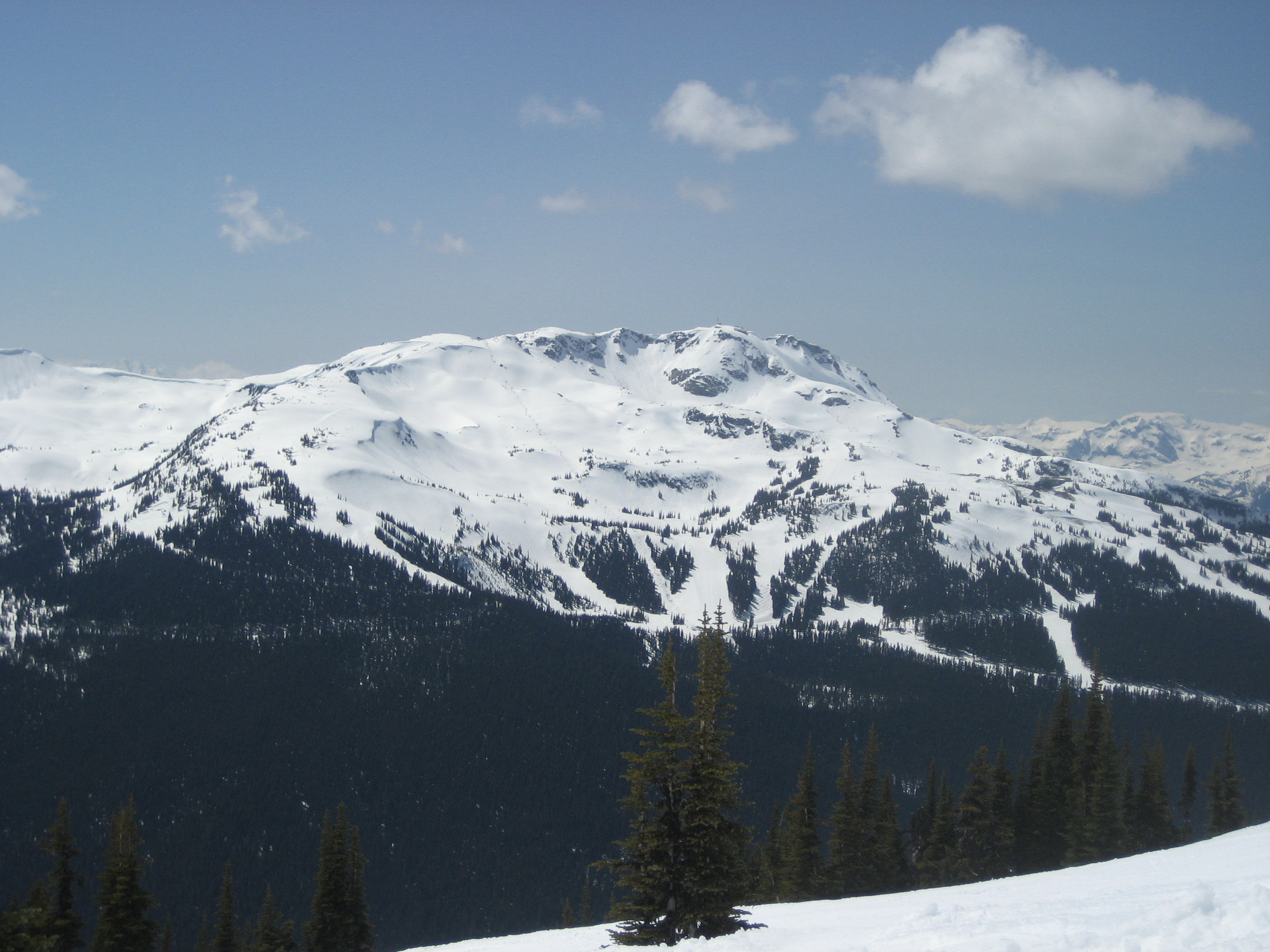
The starting line for The Amazing Race Canada 12 was atop Whistler Mountain.

CTV renewed The Amazing Race Canada for a twelfth season on September 10, 2025. Filming for this season began in Whistler, where in a new twist each team received an Express Pass at the starting line. Teams and a U-Turn Vote board were spotted outside of Union Station in Toronto on May 1, 2026. Filming then took place in Peterborough, Ontario, on the following day. A leg in Lambton County was filmed on May 7. A Viking task was set up in Gimli, Manitoba, on May 13.

=== Casting ===
Casting for this season opened on October 7, 2025, and closed on December 15.

=== Broadcast ===
On June 16, 2026, CTV announced that this season would premiere on July 7, 2026.

=== Marketing ===
Expedia, Desjardins Group, Boost, and Walt Disney Studios Motion Pictures, which promoted Moana, returned as sponsors. New sponsors included Café William, Molson Coors, Bell Canada, and Pür & Simple.

== Cast ==
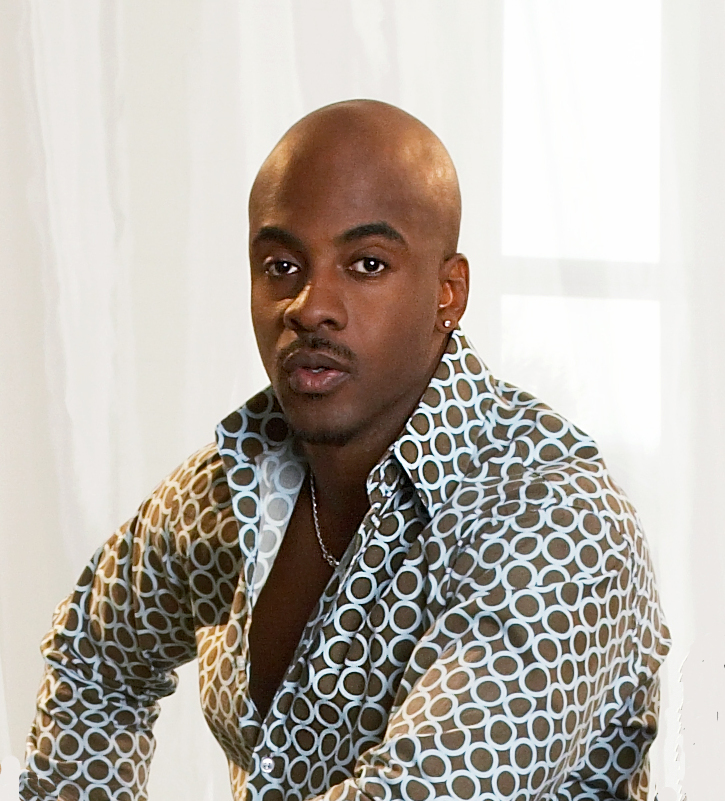
Maestro Fresh Wes

The cast was revealed on June 23, 2026, and includes Canadian Olympic athlete Sébastien Régnier, YouTube personalities Eamon Fitzgerald and Rebecca "Bec" Moroney, musicians Maestro Fresh Wes and Duane "D.O." Gibson, and Miss Universe Canada 2020 Nova Stevens.

Contestants	Age	Relationship	Hometown	Status
Maestro Fresh Wes	58	Friends	Saint John, New Brunswick	Eliminated 1st (in Kelowna, British Columbia)
Duane "D.O." Gibson	47	Friends	Woodbridge, Ontario	Eliminated 1st (in Kelowna, British Columbia)
Dana Martin-Kelly	56	Mother & Daughter	Wabush, Newfoundland and Labrador	Eliminated 2nd (in Jasper, Alberta)
Cordelia Richards	31	Mother & Daughter	Wabush, Newfoundland and Labrador	Eliminated 2nd (in Jasper, Alberta)
Keshia Gordon	35	Friends	Vancouver, British Columbia	Eliminated 3rd (in Buckhorn, Ontario)
Nova Stevens	33	Friends	Vancouver, British Columbia	Eliminated 3rd (in Buckhorn, Ontario)
Chayla Rain	29	Siblings	Edmonton, Alberta	Eliminated 4th (in Sarnia, Ontario)
Chyana Marie Sage	32	Siblings	Hamilton, Ontario	Eliminated 4th (in Sarnia, Ontario)
Filipe Masetti	39	Married Couple	Calgary, Alberta	Eliminated 5th (in St. Martins, New Brunswick)
Clara Davel	32	Married Couple	Calgary, Alberta	Eliminated 5th (in St. Martins, New Brunswick)
Ameen Fadel	26	Mother & Son	Windsor, Ontario	Eliminated 6th (in St. Martins, New Brunswick)
Surria Fadel	62	Mother & Son	Windsor, Ontario	Eliminated 6th (in St. Martins, New Brunswick)
Sacha Régnier	25	Siblings	Winnipeg, Manitoba	Eliminated 7th (in Rural Municipality of St. Andrews, Manitoba)
Sébastien Régnier	27	Siblings	Winnipeg, Manitoba	Eliminated 7th (in Rural Municipality of St. Andrews, Manitoba)
Michele Bruzzese	28	Siblings	Toronto, Ontario	Third place
Matteo Bruzzese	26	Siblings	Toronto, Ontario	Third place
Eamon Fitzgerald	34	Married Couple	Toronto, Ontario	Runners-up
Rebecca "Bec" Moroney	36	Married Couple	Toronto, Ontario	Runners-up
Tina Liao	32	Twin Sisters	Hamilton, Ontario	Winners
Liz Liao	32	Twin Sisters	Hamilton, Ontario	Winners

== Results ==
The following teams are listed with their placements in each leg. Placements are listed in finishing order.

- A red placement with a dagger (†) indicates that the team was eliminated.
- An underlined blue placement with a double-dagger (‡) indicates that the team was the last to arrive at a Pit Stop in a non-elimination leg, and had to perform a Speed Bump task in the following leg.
- An italicized and underlined placement indicates that the team was the last to arrive at a Pit Stop, but there was no rest period at the Pit Stop and all teams were instructed to continue racing.
- A green α indicates that the team found the Assist during the leg.
- A purple ε indicates that the team used an Express Pass on that leg to bypass one of their tasks.
- A violet + indicates that teams encountered an Intersection.
- A brown ⊂ indicates the team on the receiving end of a U-Turn.
- A brown ∈ indicates that the team used the Pass and a brown ∋ indicates the team on the receiving end of the Pass.
- A teal х indicates that the leg featured a Face Off challenge.

Team placement (by leg)
Team	1	2	3	4+ (Note: This leg featured an Intersection. The combined teams were, in order of formation: Eamon & Bec and Ameen & Surria, Michele & Matteo and Keshia & Nova, Chayla & Chyana and Sacha & Sébastien, Tina & Liz and Filipe & Clara.)	5	6х	7х	8	9	10
Tina & Liz	1st	2nd (Note: Sacha & Sébastien and Tina & Liz tied for 2nd place after both teams stepped on the Pit Stop mat at the same time.)	3rd	3rdɛ (Note: This team used their Express Pass to bypass one of the tasks on this leg.)	4th⊂	1st	3rd	1st	1st	1st
Eamon & Bec	3rd	1stɛ	2nd	1st	3rd⊂	6th	2nd	3rd	2nd	2nd
Michele & Matteo	8thɛ	6th	6th	7th	5thα (Note: This team used the Assist on this leg.)	3rd	6thα	4th	3rd	3rd
Sacha & Sébastien	4th	2nd	1st	6th	1stɛ	4th	5th	2nd	4th†	
Ameen & Surria	7th	5thɛ	7th	2nd	6th	2nd	1st	5th† (Note: This was a double-elimination leg; the last two teams to check in at the Pit Stop were both eliminated.)		
Filipe & Clara	2nd	4thα	4thɛ	4th	2nd	7th	4th	6th†		
Chayla & Chyana	9thɛ	7th	8th∋ (Note: Keshia & Nova chose to use the Pass on Chayla & Chyana.)	5th	7th	5th	7th†			
Keshia & Nova	6th	9th	5th^{ɛ}_{∈}	8th‡α	8th†⊂					
Dana & Cordelia	5th	8thɛ (Note: Dana & Cordelia initially arrived 7th, but were issued a 2-hour penalty. Chayla & Chyana checked in during this penalty time, dropping Dana & Cordelia to 8th.)	9th†α (Note: Dana & Cordelia initially arrived 8th, but were issued a 90-minute penalty. Chayla & Chyana checked in during this penalty time, dropping Dana & Cordelia to last place.)							
Maestro & Duane	10th‡ɛ	10th†								

== Race summary ==
Destinations	Air travel Rail travel Water travel Bus travel Helicopter travel Bicycle travel Gondola travel
Route Markers	Detour Roadblock Face Off Express Pass Assist; Intersection U-Turn Pass Speed Bump Pit Stop

=== Leg 1 (British Columbia) ===
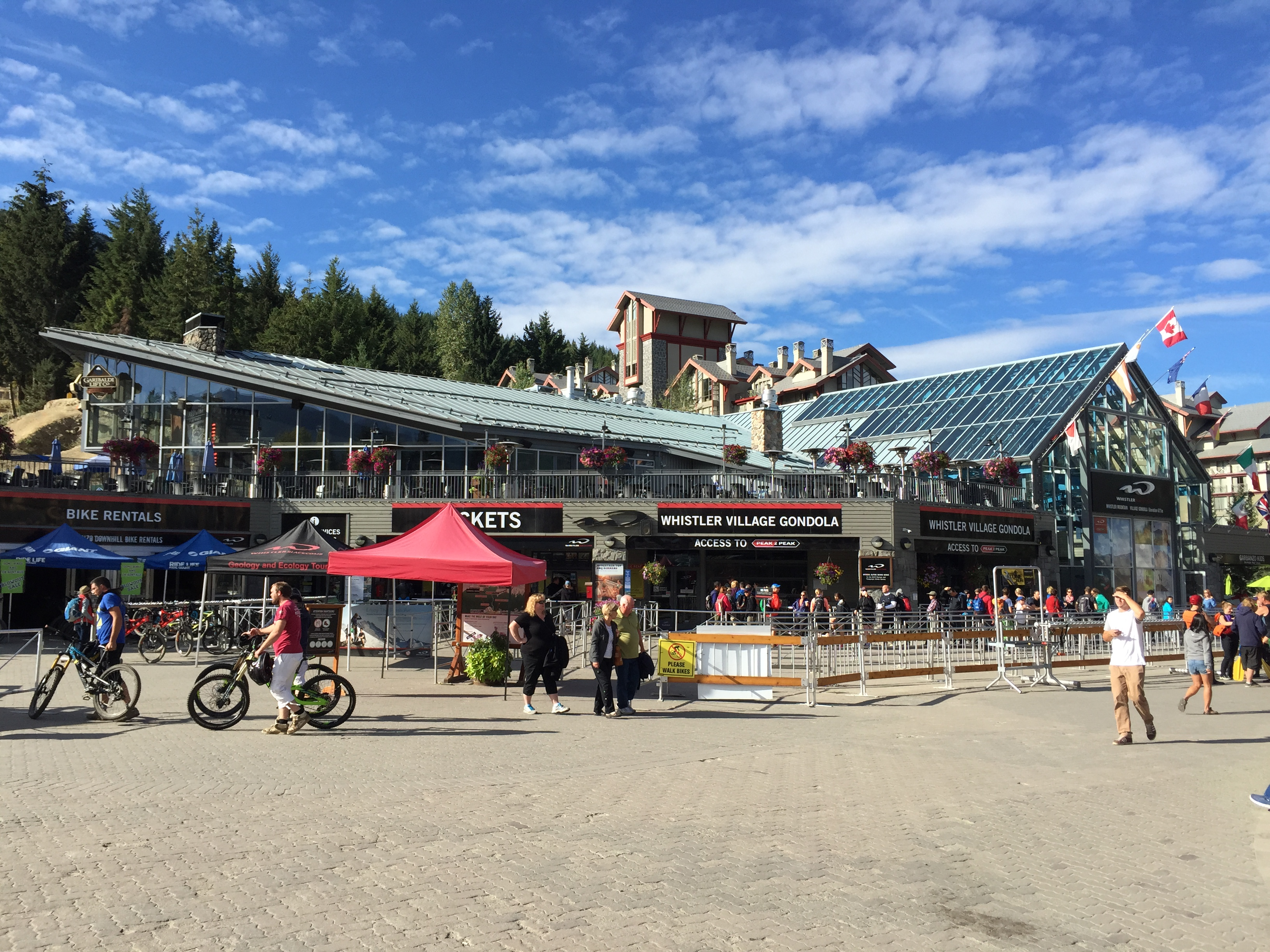
The first Detour of The Amazing Race Canada 12 was located in Whistler Village.

- Episode 1: "Express Pass Let's Go" (July 7, 2026)
- Prize: CA$20,000, cashback rewards for a trip for two to Rio de Janeiro, Brazil, 2026 FIFA World Cup jerseys, and a year-long 5G smart device package (awarded to Tina & Liz)

Locations

- Whistler, British Columbia (Whistler Mountain – Whistler Blackcomb) (Starting Line)
- Whistler (Roundhouse Lodge → Whistler Village Gondola Station)
- Whistler (Carleton Lodge or Longhorn Saloon)
- Whistler (Whistler Sailing Club)
- Whistler (Alta Lake)
- Squamish (Squamish Canyon)
- Squamish (Capilano University Squamish Campus – Soccer Field)

Episode summary

- Teams began the race atop Whistler Mountain and had to dig through a marked snow field for a metal box with their next clue and an Express Pass, which they could use through the fifth leg. No more than one team could redeem an Express Pass on any given task.
- This season's first Detour was a choice between Sparkle or Shine. For both tasks, teams had to first travel by gondola down to Whistler Village. In Sparkle, teams had to untangle a ball of twinkle lights and string the lights on one letter of a Whistler sign to receive their next clue. In Shine, teams had to perform an après-ski dance to receive their next clue. Maestro & Duane used their Express Pass to bypass this task.
- After the Detour, teams had to travel by taxi to the Whistler Sailing Club to find their next clue. There, teams received a video message from Catherine Laga'aia, who played Moana in Moana and instructed them to sail to two buoys on Alta Lake and retrieve three objects from the movie (a coconut, a conch shell, and an oar) to receive their next clue. Michele & Matteo used their Express Pass to bypass this task.
- In this season's first Roadblock, one team member had to walk across a slackline strung between the Squamish Canyon 100 feet above the Mamquam River and retrieve their next clue, which directed them to the Pit Stop: the soccer field of the Capilano University Squamish Campus. Chayla & Chyana used their Express Pass to bypass this task.

Additional note

- This was a non-elimination leg.

=== Leg 2 (British Columbia) ===
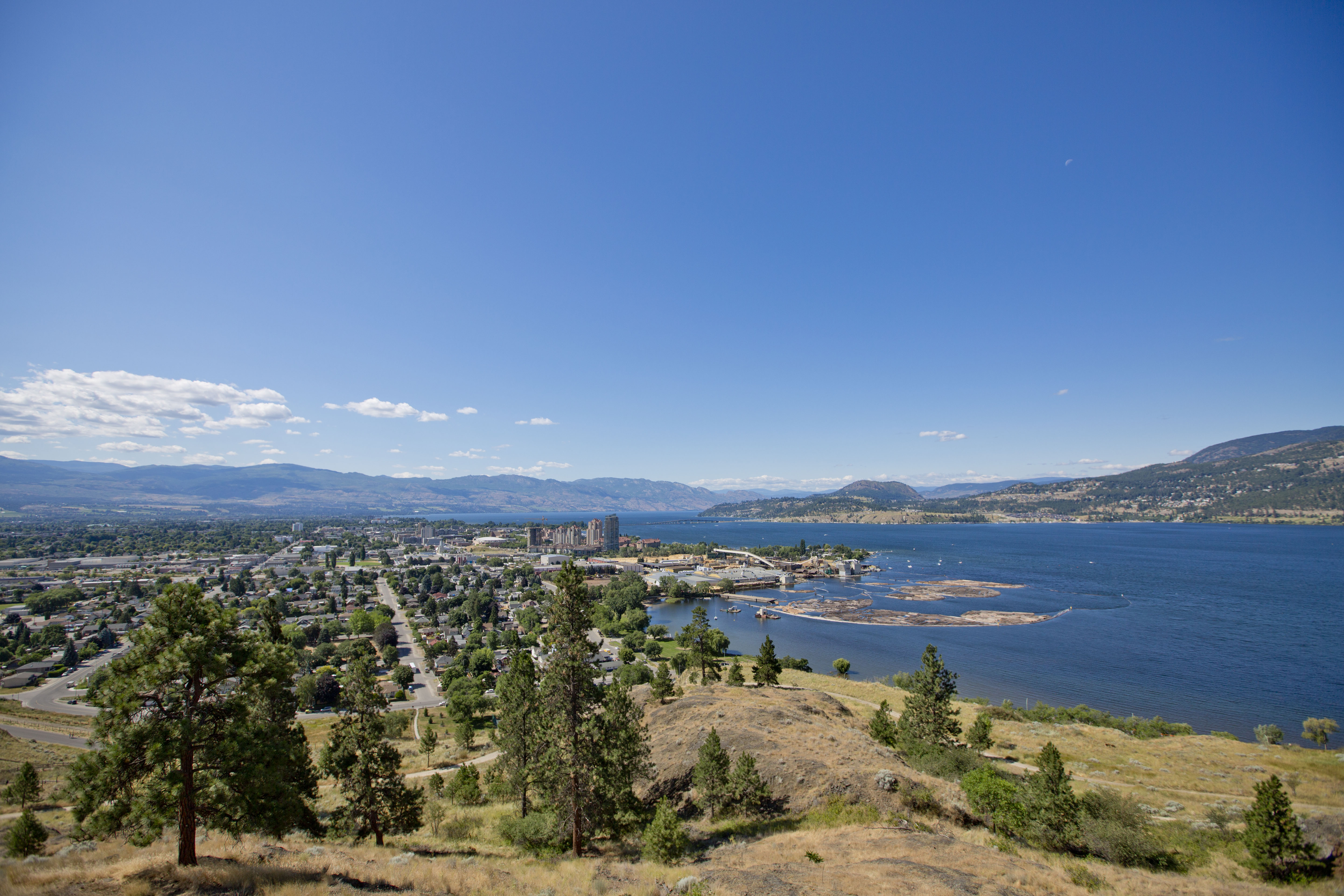
Teams had to memorize the thirteen Nsyilxcən moon cycles at Knox Mountain Park in Kelowna.

- Episode 2: "Is This Your Poo?" (July 14, 2026)
- Prize: CA$10,000 and cashback rewards for a trip for two to Edinburgh, Scotland (awarded to Eamon & Bec)
- Eliminated: Maestro & Duane

Locations

- Richmond (Sandman Hotel & Suites Vancouver Airport)
- Richmond (Fairmont Vancouver Airport)
- Vancouver (Vancouver International Airport) → Kelowna (Kelowna International Airport)
- Kootenay Boundary (Big White Ski Resort)
- Kelowna (Kangaroo Creek Farm)
- Kelowna (Knox Mountain Park)
- West Kelowna (Paynter's Fruit Market)
- Kelowna (KF Centre for Excellence)

Episode summary

- At the start of this leg, teams were instructed to fly on one of two flights to Kelowna based on their order of arrival at Fairmont Vancouver Airport. Once in Kelowna, teams had to drive to Big White Ski Resort to find their next clue.
- For their Speed Bump, Maestro & Duane had to stack snow tubes before they could continue racing.
- In this leg's first Roadblock, one team member had to navigate a slalom course on a sit-ski and collect five flags within two minutes to receive their next clue. Ameen & Surria used their Express Pass to bypass this task.
- After the first Roadblock, teams had to drive to Kangaroo Creek Farm, where they had to collect kangaroo droppings until they filled a bucket to receive their next clue. The Assist was hidden in one clue, found by Filipe & Clara, and provided them with a half-filled bucket.
- Teams then had to drive to Knox Mountain Park, listen to two Syilx elders describe the thirteen moon cycles in Nsyilxcən, and arrange the moon cycles onto a turtle puzzle to receive their next clue. Eamon & Bec used their Express Pass to bypass this task.
- In this leg's second Roadblock, the team member who did not perform the previous Roadblock had to assemble an irrigation sprinkler system to receive their next clue, which directed them to the Pit Stop: the KF Centre for Excellence. Dana & Cordelia used their Express Pass to bypass this task.

=== Leg 3 (British Columbia → Alberta) ===
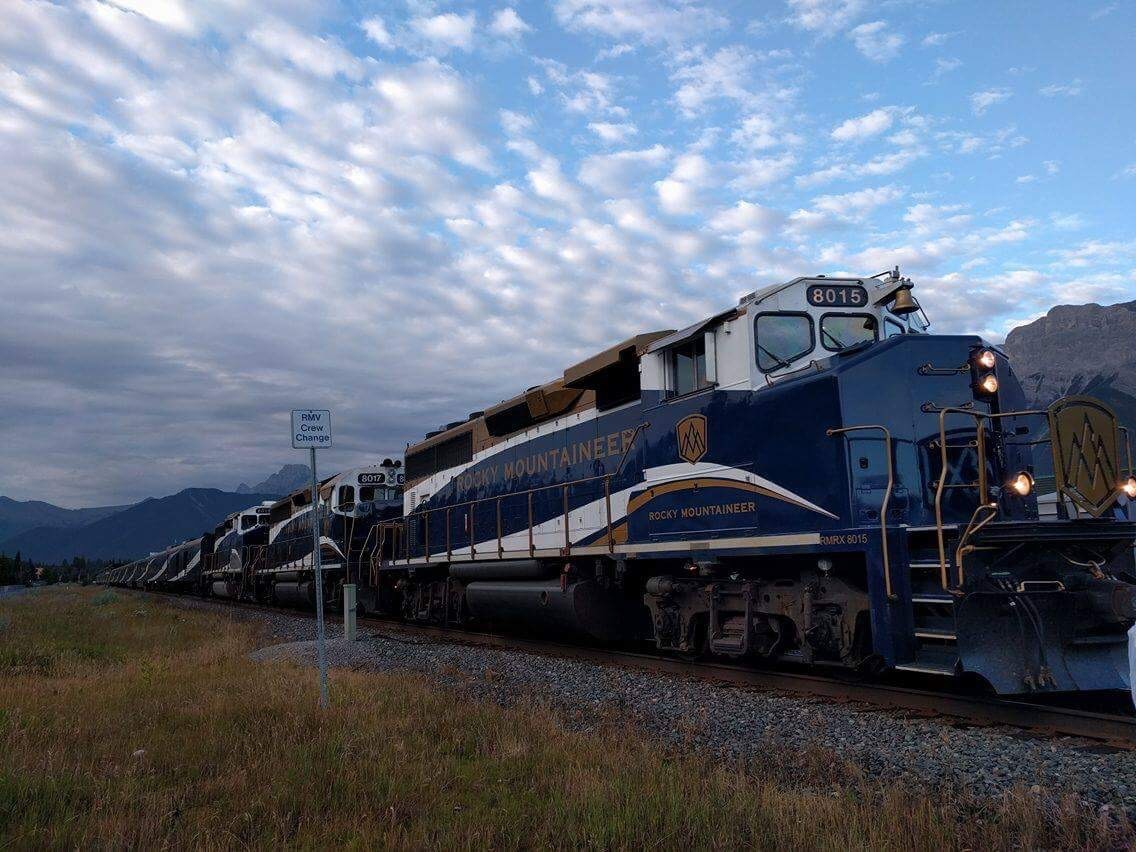
Racers faced the first-ever Travelling Roadblock on board the Rocky Mountaineer while en route to Jasper, Alberta.

- Episode 3: "We're Here Baby We're Trying to Win" (July 21, 2026)
- Prize: CA$10,000 and cashback rewards for a trip for two to Malta (awarded to Sacha & Sébastien)
- Eliminated: Dana & Cordelia

Locations

- Kelowna (Kelowna Yacht Club)
- Falkland (Falkland Stampede Grounds)
- Kamloops (Kamloops Railway Station) → Jasper, Alberta (Jasper Railway Station)
- Jasper (Pine Bungalows)
- Jasper (Fairmont Jasper Park Lodge Golf Course or Jasper Park Information Centre)
- Jasper (Old Fort Point)
- Jasper (Morro Slabs)
- Jasper (Maligne Lookout)

Episode summary

- At the start of this leg, teams were instructed to drive to the Falkland Stampede Grounds and take part in a Calf Scramble that involved grabbing two matching ribbons from a calf's tail to receive their next clue. The Assist was hidden in one clue, found by Dana & Cordelia, and allowed them to grab only one ribbon.
- Teams then had to board the Rocky Mountaineer and travel to Jasper, Alberta. Partway during their train ride, a clue box would emerge in their train car.
- In the series' first Travelling Roadblock, one team member had to memorize a dinner menu and serve four dishes before the train arrived in Jasper; otherwise they would receive a penalty. Filipe & Clara used their Express Pass to bypass this task.
- Once in Jasper, teams had to drive to the Pine Bungalows for their next clue.
- This leg's Detour was a choice between Plant It or Box It. Each task had a limit of five stations, and both tasks contributed towards the recovery from the 2024 Jasper wildfire. In Plant It, teams had to plant five Douglas fir trees to receive their next clue. Keshia & Nova used their Express Pass to bypass this task. In Box It, teams had to construct a garden box to receive their next clue.
- After the Detour, teams had to find their next clue at Old Fort Point.
- In this leg's second Roadblock, the team member who did not perform the previous Roadblock had to rappel 100 feet down the Morro Slabs, retrieve their next clue, and climb back up.
- After the second Roadblock, teams had to check in at the Pit Stop: the Maligne Lookout.

Additional note

- At the Blind Double Pass, Keshia & Nova chose to use the Pass on Chayla & Chyana.

=== Leg 4 (Alberta → Quebec) ===
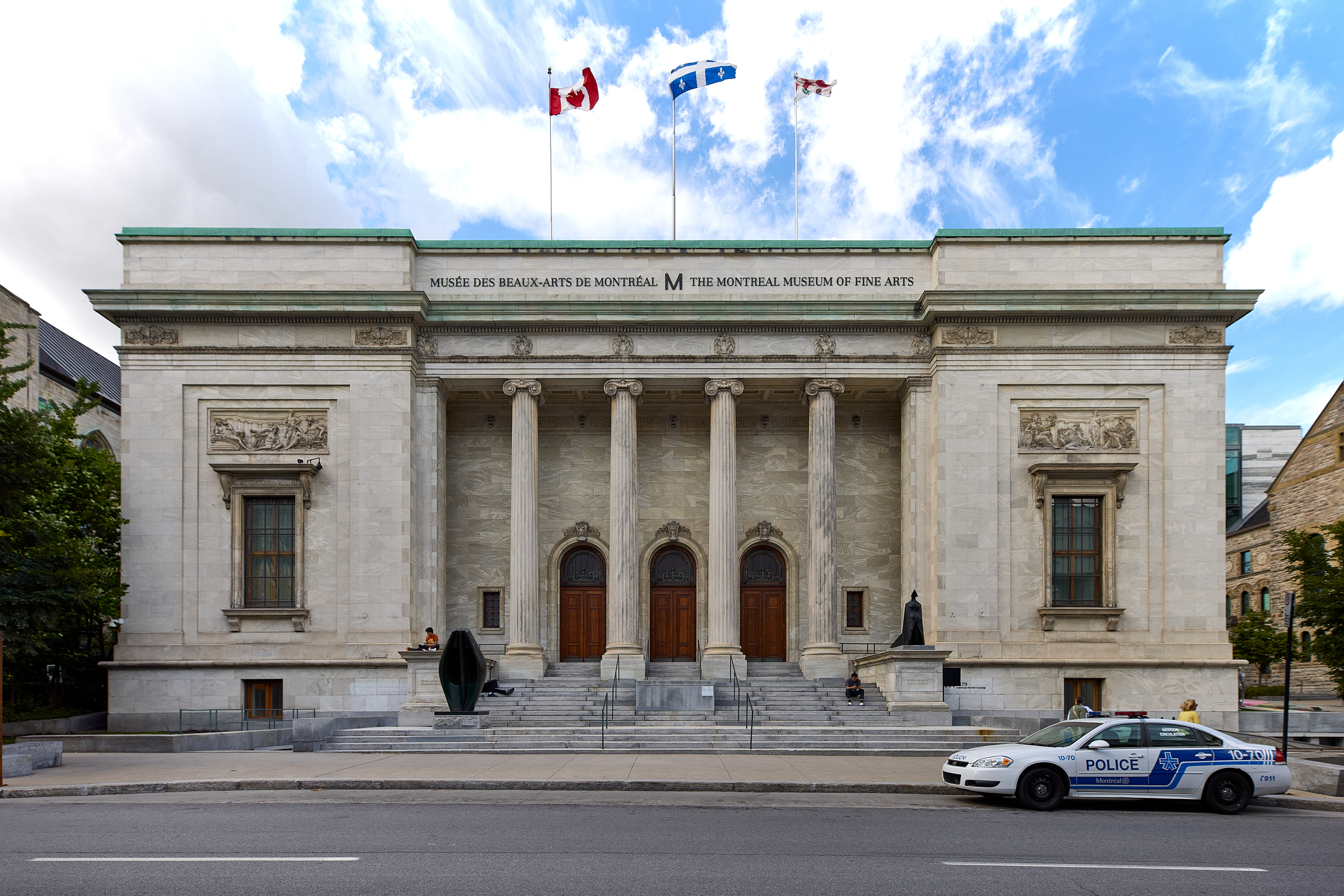
The show's first Intersection was located outside of the Montreal Museum of Fine Arts.

- Episode 4: "Our Taxi Left Us" (July 28, 2026)
- Prize: CA$10,000 and cashback rewards for a trip for two to Dubrovnik, Croatia (awarded to Eamon & Bec)

Locations

- Leduc (Best Western Plus Edmonton Airport Hotel)
- Edmonton (Edmonton International Airport) → Montreal, Quebec (Montréal–Trudeau International Airport)
- Laval (Serres Cléroux Garden Centre)
- Montreal (Montreal Museum of Fine Arts)
- Montreal (Club Electric Avenue)
- Montreal (Petros Taverna Griffintown or Musée Imaginarium)
- Montreal (Peel Pub)
- Laval (Centre de la Nature de Laval)

Episode summary

- At the start of this leg, teams were instructed to fly to Montreal, Quebec, and then travel by taxi to the Serres Cléroux Garden Centre in Laval for their next clue.
- Teams received a flower order and had to search the greenhouse for sixteen specific varieties of flowers to receive their next clue sending them to the Montreal Museum of Fine Arts and a Molson Canadian beer box, which they would use to collect items for later in the leg. The Assist was hidden in one clue, found by Keshia & Nova, and allowed them to find only eight flowers.
- Teams encountered an Intersection, which required two teams to mutually join together to complete the following task. The teams were paired up thusly: Eamon & Bec and Ameen & Surria, Michele & Matteo and Keshia & Nova, Chayla & Chyana and Sacha & Sébastien, and Tina & Liz and Filipe & Clara.
- In this leg's Roadblock, one member from each of the newly-joined teams had to perform a disco routine at Club Electric Avenue to receive their next clue and pint glasses. After this task, teams were no longer joined.
- This leg's Detour was a choice between Shout Opa or Say Cheese. Each task had a limit of four stations, and the clue was written in Quebec French. In Shout Opa, teams had to travel to Petros Taverna Griffintown and solve a 30-piece broken plate puzzle to receive their next clue and a beer tap handle. In Say Cheese, teams had to travel to the Musée Imaginarium, choose one of five displays, spot the differences from a reference photograph, add the missing items to the display, and ask a local to join them for a selfie to receive their next clue and a beer tap handle. Tina & Liz used their Express Pass to bypass this task.
- After the Detour, teams had to travel to Peel Pub, properly pour four beer pints, and serve a table of customers to receive their next clue, which directed them to the Pit Stop: the Centre de la Nature de Laval.

Additional note

- This was a non-elimination leg.

=== Leg 5 (Quebec → Ontario) ===
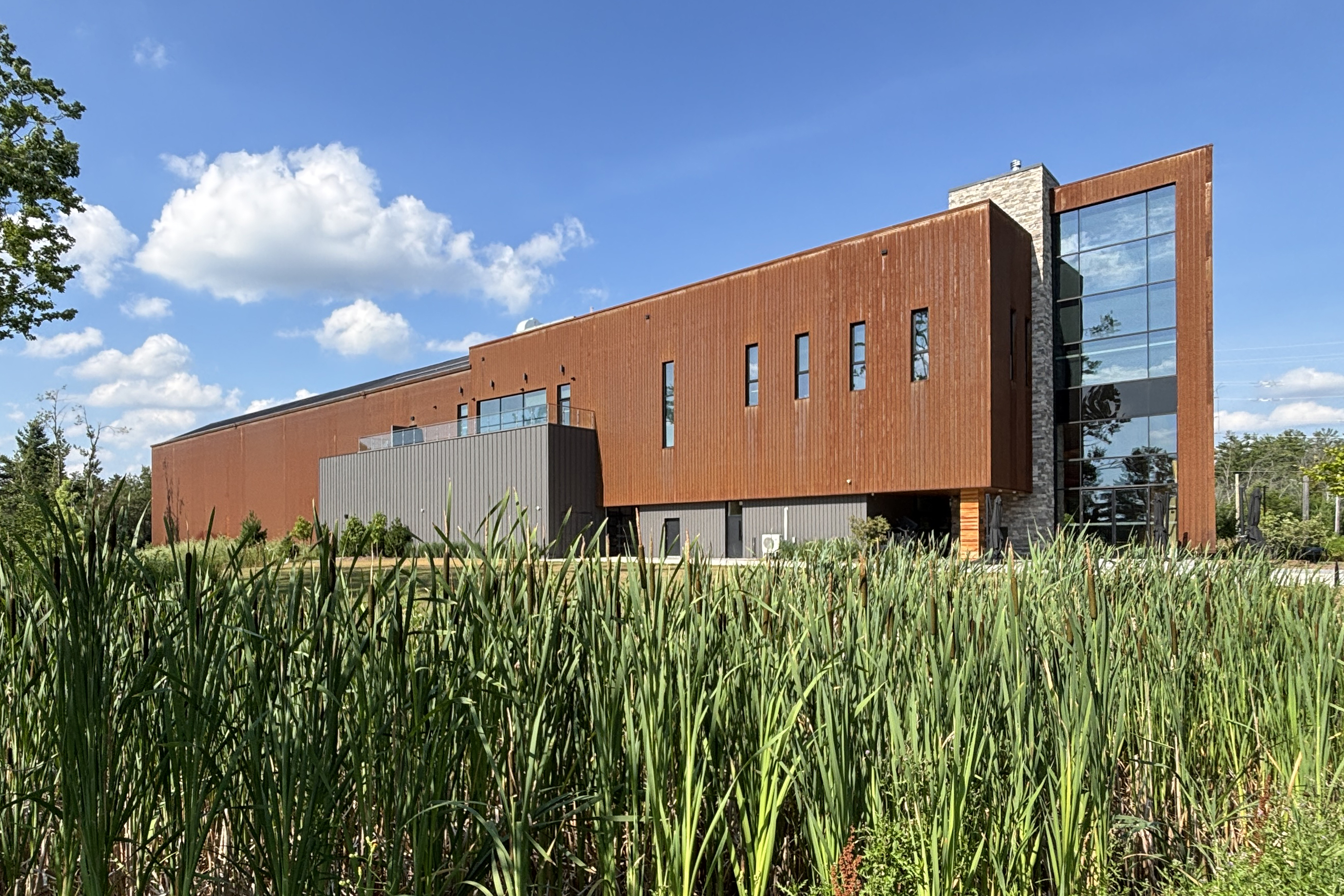
Teams learned the results of the U-Turn Vote outside of the Canadian Canoe Museum in Peterborough, Ontario.

- Episode 5: "We Got the Beaver" (August 11, 2026)
- Prize: CA$10,000 and cashback rewards for a trip for two to Patagonia, Chile (awarded to Sacha & Sébastien)
- Eliminated: Keshia & Nova

Locations

- Laval (Parc de la Rivière-des-Mille-Îles)
- Montreal (Montréal–Trudeau International Airport) → Toronto, Ontario (Toronto Pearson International Airport)
- Toronto (Pearson Airport Station → Union Station)
- Toronto (Union Station) → Oshawa (Oshawa GO Station)
- Peterborough (Peterborough City Hall)
- Peterborough (Rogers Cove)
- Peterborough (Canadian Canoe Museum)
- Peterborough (Canadian Canoe Museum or Beavermead Park)
- Peterborough (Ontario Turtle Conservation Centre)
- Bobcaygeon (Kawartha Dairy Company)
- Buckhorn (Trent–Severn Waterway – Lock 31)

Episode summary

- At the start of this leg, teams were instructed to fly on one of two flights to Toronto, Ontario, and then travel by Union Pearson Express to Union Station, where they found a U-Turn Vote outside of the station. Teams then had to travel on one of two trains to Oshawa and drive to Peterborough.
- The following morning, teams found a clue outside Peterborough City Hall and had to complete three Canadian cottage games – ladder toss, cornhole, and frisnok – in succession at Rogers Cove to receive their next clue, which sent them to the U-Turn reveal board outside of the Canadian Canoe Museum. Sacha & Sébastien used their Express Pass to bypass this task.
- This leg's Detour was a choice between Inside or Outside. In Inside, teams had to choose a written description of two canoes and search the Canadian Canoe Museum for the matching canoes to receive their next clue. In Outside, teams had to paddle a canoe through a course on Little Lake within seven minutes to receive their next clue.
- After the Detour, teams had to drive to the Ontario Turtle Conservation Centre and clean a snapping turtle habitat to receive their next clue.
- Teams then had to drive to the Kawartha Dairy Company, where they had to memorize ice cream and butter tart orders and make deliveries to three locations using a cycle rickshaw to receive their next clue, which directed them to the Pit Stop: Lock 31 of the Trent–Severn Waterway. The Assist was hidden in one clue, found by Michele & Matteo, and allowed them to make one delivery.

Additional note

- Teams encountered a U-Turn Vote. For their Speed Bump, Keshia & Nova received a penalty vote. While intended as a Double U-Turn, three teams were U-Turned as there was a tie for second place. The teams' votes were as follows:

U-Turn Vote results
Team	Vote
Ameen & Surria	Keshia & Nova
Chayla & Chyana	Eamon & Bec
Eamon & Bec	Keshia & Nova
Filipe & Clara	Keshia & Nova
Keshia & Nova	Tina & Liz
Michele & Matteo	Eamon & Bec
Sacha & Sébastien	Tina & Liz
Tina & Liz	Keshia & Nova
Penalty Vote	Keshia & Nova

=== Leg 6 (Ontario) ===
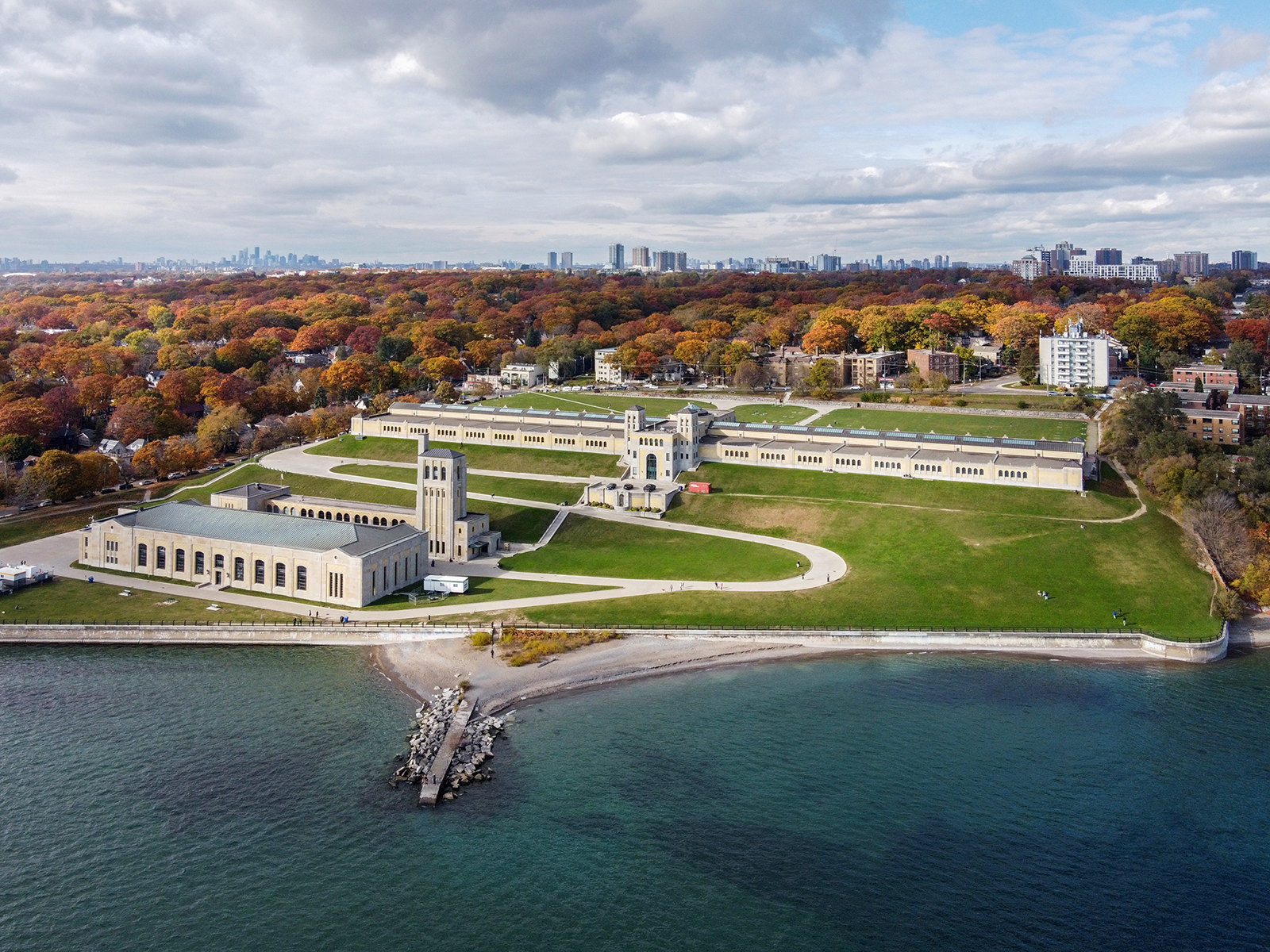
Jon informed teams that they were still racing at the R. C. Harris Water Treatment Plant in the district of Scarborough.

- Episode 6: "We Like to Watch Romcoms Together" (August 18, 2026)
- Prize: CA$10,000 and cashback rewards for a trip for two to Barcelona, Spain (awarded to Tina & Liz)

Locations

- Peterborough (Holiday Inn Peterborough-Waterfront)
- Peterborough (Confederation Square) → Toronto (Union Station)
- Toronto (Union Station → Scarborough GO Station, Eglinton GO Station or Guildwood GO Station)
- Toronto (Toronto Pan Am Sports Centre or Casa Deluz Banquet Hall)
- Markham (Canadian Community Table Tennis Association)
- Markham (Unionville – Millennium Bandstand)
- Toronto (R. C. Harris Water Treatment Plant)

Episode summary

- At the start of this leg, teams were instructed to travel on one of two buses to Union Station in Toronto and search the GO Transit concourse for their next clue.
- This leg's Detour was a choice between Sync or Sum. Each task had limit of four stations. For both tasks, teams first had to travel by train to the Toronto district of Scarborough. In Sync, teams had to perform a synchronized diving routine to receive their next clue. In Sum, teams had to memorize and serve ten dim sum orders to customers who speak Cantonese to receive their next clue.
- For this season's first Face Off, two teams competed against each other in a game of table tennis. The first team to score 11 points received their next clue, while the losing team had to wait for another team. The last team had to turn over an hourglass and wait for the sand to run out before they could continue racing.
- In this leg's Roadblock, one team member had to perform a scene for a Christmas romcom movie to receive their next clue, which directed them to the Pit Stop: the R. C. Harris Water Treatment Plant in Scarborough.

Additional notes

- Olympic medalist Andre De Grasse appeared as the Pit Stop greeter during this leg.
- There was no elimination at the end of this leg; all teams were instead instructed to continue racing.

=== Leg 7 (Ontario) ===
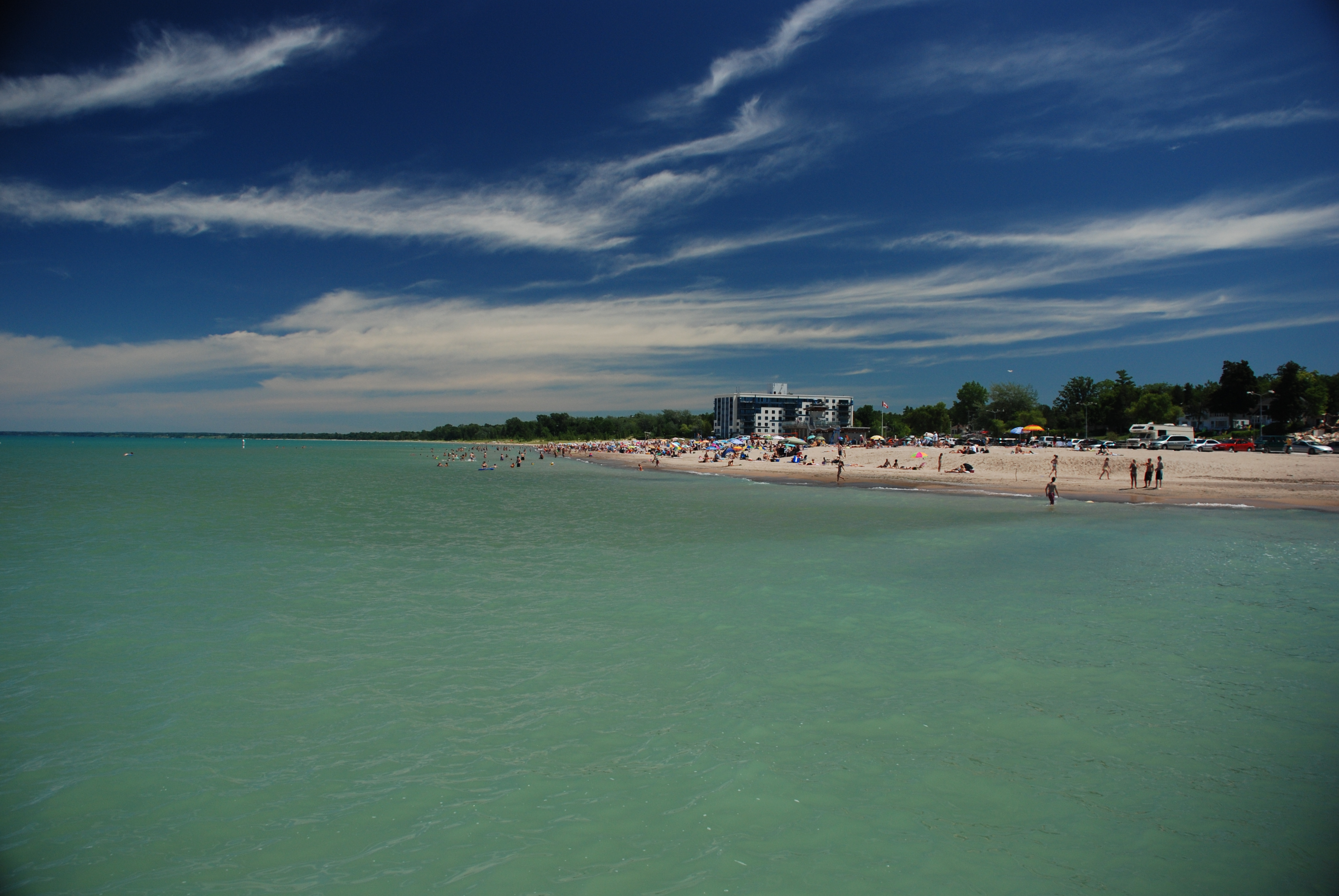
This leg in Lambton County set on the shores of Lake Huron included a visit to Grand Bend.

- Episode 7: "I Love Metal Detectors" (August 25, 2026)
- Prize: CA$15,000 and cashback rewards for a trip for two to Hanoi, Vietnam (awarded to Ameen & Surria)
- Eliminated: Chayla & Chyana

Locations

- Toronto (A1 Bait)
- Oshawa (Oshawa Executive Airport) → Huron Park (Centralia/James T. Field Memorial Aerodrome)
- Grand Bend (Grand Bend Beach)
- Oil Springs (Oil Museum of Canada)
- Sarnia (Mike Weir Park – Sarnia Cricket Club)
- Sarnia (Pür & Simple)
- Point Edward (Purdy's Fish Market)
- Sarnia (Point Lands Park – Great Lakes Monument)

Episode summary

- At the start of this leg, teams had to travel to A1 Bait, where they had to sort 600 worms into 50 containers and then count a box of worms to receive their next clue. The Assist was hidden in one clue, found by Michele & Matteo, and allowed them to skip the first part of this task.
- From A1 Bait, teams had to travel to Oshawa and sign up for one of four flights to Southwestern Ontario. Once there, teams had to drive to Grand Bend Beach and use a metal detector to find a miniature pumpjack to receive their next clue. Teams then had to drive to the Oil Museum of Canada and assemble a spring pole drilling rig to receive their next clue.
- For this season's second Face Off, two teams competed against each other in a game of cricket. Racers had to use a cricket bat to hit balls at targets with points. After each racer faced five bowls, the team that scored more points received their next clue and a bottle of maple syrup, while the losing team had to wait for another team. The last team had to turn over an hourglass and wait for the sand to run out before they could continue racing.
- After the Face Off, teams had to drive to Pür & Simple and deliver the maple syrup to the Sarnia Brigade baseball team in exchange for their next clue. Teams then had to drive to Purdy's Fish Market, catch ten walleye fish from a tank, and release them into the St. Clair River to receive their next clue, which directed them to the Pit Stop: the Great Lakes Monument at Point Lands Park.

=== Leg 8 (Ontario → Nova Scotia → New Brunswick) ===
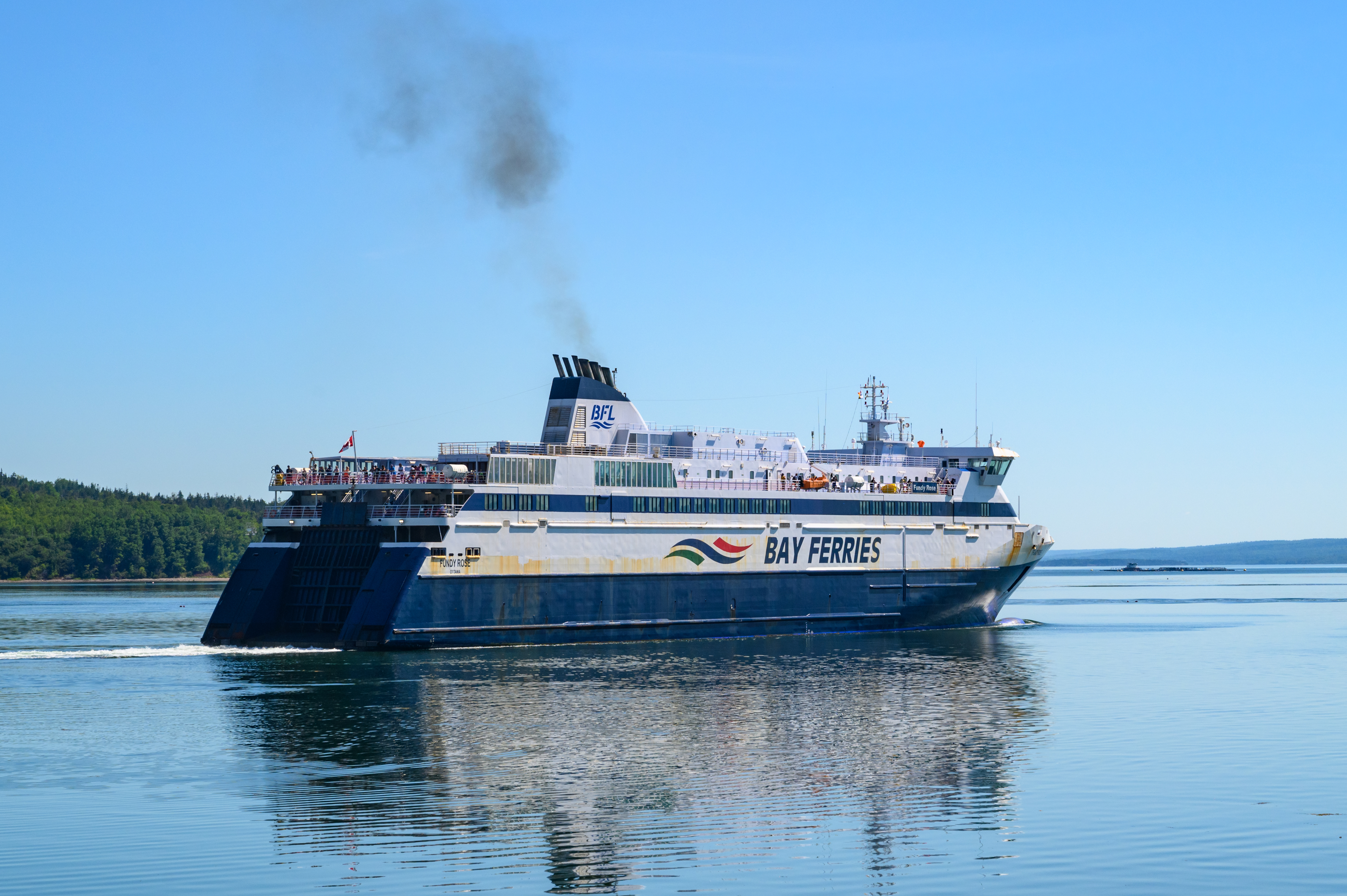
In the Maritimes, teams visited Digby, Nova Scotia, before travelling across the Bay of Fundy to Saint John, New Brunswick.

- Episode 8: "Not So Boo Anymore!" (September 1, 2026)
- Prize: CA$15,000 and cashback rewards for a trip for two to Sydney, Australia (awarded to Tina & Liz)
- Eliminated: Filipe & Clara and Ameen & Surria

Locations

- Toronto (Best Western Plus Travel Hotel Toronto Airport)
- Toronto (Toronto Pearson International Airport) → Halifax, Nova Scotia (Halifax Stanfield International Airport)
- Digby (Digby Fisherman's Wharf & Birch Street Seafoods)
- Digby (Bay Ferries Terminal) → Saint John, New Brunswick (Port of Saint John)
- Saint John (Royal Kennebeccasis Yacht Club)
- Saint John (Crave Lounge & Bar)
- Saint John (Strescon NB Office & Precast Plant)
- St. Martins (St. Martins Sea Caves)

Episode summary

- At the start of this leg, teams were instructed to fly to Halifax, Nova Scotia. Once there, teams had to drive to the wharf in Digby to find their next clue.
- In this leg's first Roadblock, one team member had to shuck three pounds of scallops and then travel to Birch Street Seafoods, where they had to clean and package the scallops into three bags to receive their next clue.
- After the first Roadblock, teams had to travel on the Fundy Rose ferry to Saint John, New Brunswick, and find their next clue at the Royal Kennebeccasis Yacht Club. There, teams had to assemble a stained glass sailboat to receive their next clue.
- In this leg's second Roadblock, the team member who did not perform the previous Roadblock had to become a DJ and perform a series of tracks and effects to receive their next clue.
- After the second Roadblock, teams had to drive to the Strescon NB Office & Precast Plant. There, teams had to assemble a mold for a precast concrete wall panel and then pour in concrete to receive their next clue, which directed them to the Pit Stop: the St. Martins Sea Caves.

Additional note

- This leg featured a double elimination; the last two teams to arrive at the Pit Stop were eliminated.

=== Leg 9 (New Brunswick → Manitoba) ===
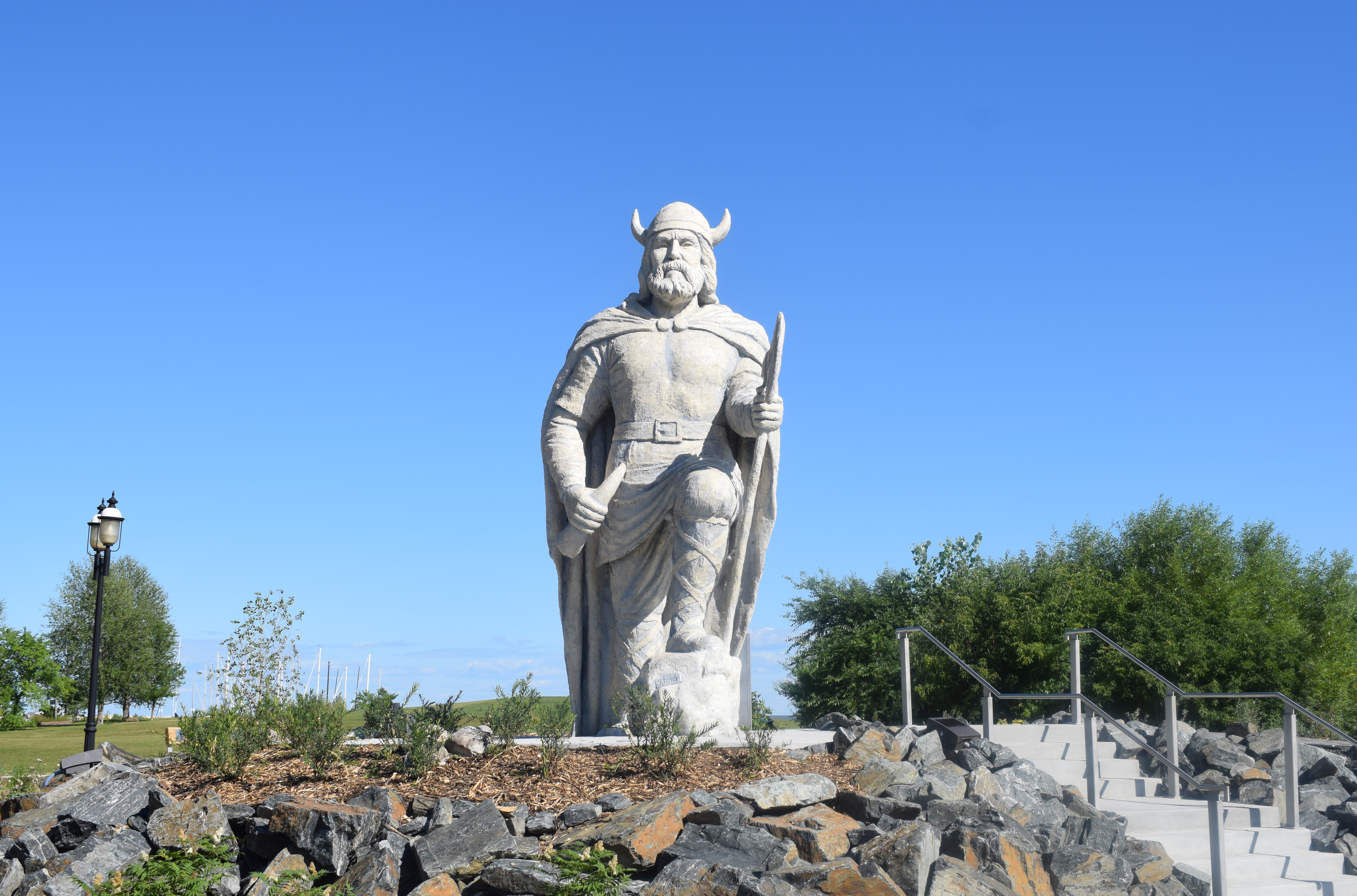
The Roadblock in Gimli, Manitoba, referenced the town's Icelandic heritage with an Icelandic spelling bee.

- Episode 9: "It's Math Time" (September 8, 2026)
- Prize: CA$15,000 and cashback rewards for a trip for two to Kyoto, Japan (awarded to Tina & Liz)
- Eliminated: Sacha & Sébastien

Locations

- Saint John (Market Square – The Gathering Place)
- Saint John (Saint John Airport) → Winnipeg, Manitoba (Winnipeg Richardson International Airport)
- Gimli (Viking Statue)
- Gimli (Gimli Harbour)
- Winnipeg (True North Square – Dale Hawerchuk Monument)
- Winnipeg (The Forks Market or 201 Portage & MTS Place Main)
- Winnipeg (Activate Winnipeg West)
- Winnipeg (Red River College Polytechnic)
- Rural Municipality of St. Andrews (Lower Fort Garry)

Episode summary

- At the start of this leg, teams were instructed to fly to Winnipeg, Manitoba. Once there, teams had to travel by taxi to the Viking statue in Gimli to find their next clue.
- In this leg's Roadblock, one team member had to memorize ten Icelandic words and their English translations and then compete in a spelling bee where they had to correctly spell one of the words to receive their next clue.
- After the Roadblock, teams had to find their next clue by the Dale Hawerchuk Monument.
- This season's final Detour was a choice between Whirl or Wind. In Whirl, teams had to perform a Red River Jig alongside Métis dancers to receive their next clue. In Wind, teams had to memorize a plaque displaying three historic weather events and then calculate their wind chills to receive their next clue.
- After the Detour, teams had to travel to Activate Winnipeg West and complete a round of the Mega Grid video game challenge by pressing all the blue buttons and floor tiles without losing their four lives to receive their next clue. Teams then had to travel to Red River College Polytechnic and assemble a timber-framed pergola to receive their next clue, which directed them to the Pit Stop: Lower Fort Garry.

=== Leg 10 (Manitoba → Alberta) ===
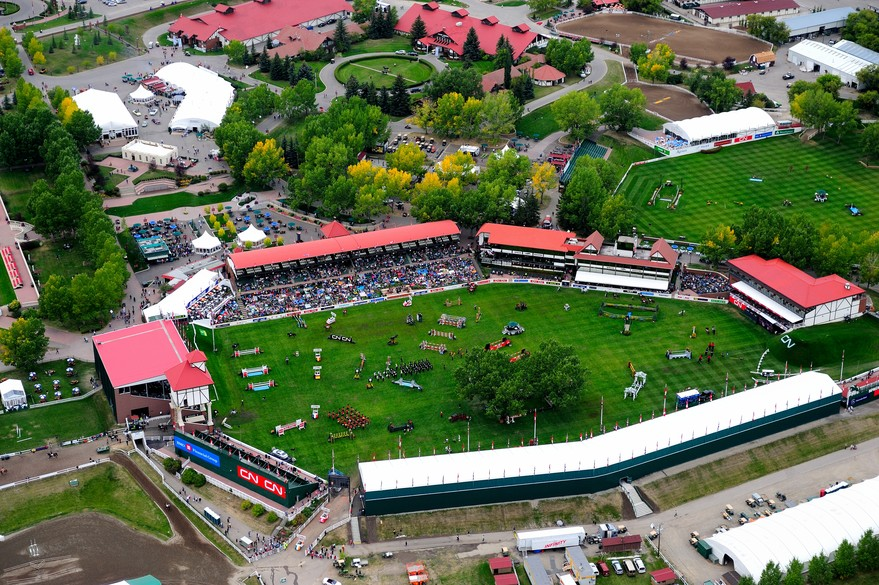
Following a Calgary Stampede-themed final leg, teams found the finish line for The Amazing Race Canada 12 at Spruce Meadows.

- Episode 10: "Dai! Dai! Dai!" (September 15, 2026)
- Prize: CA$250,000 and cashback rewards for a trip for two around the world
- Winners: Tina & Liz
- Runners-up: Eamon & Bec
- Third place: Matteo & Michele

Locations

- Winnipeg (The Forks – Winnipeg Sign)
- Winnipeg (Winnipeg Richardson International Airport) → Calgary, Alberta (Calgary International Airport)
- Calgary (GMC Stadium)
- Calgary (Inglewood – Smithbilt Hats)
- Calgary (McMahon Stadium)
- Calgary (Macron Performance Centre)
- Calgary (Heritage Park Historical Village)
- Calgary (Spruce Meadows – All Canada Ring)

Episode summary

- At the start of this leg, teams were instructed to fly to Calgary, Alberta. Once there, teams had to travel by taxi to GMC Stadium to find their next clue.
- In this leg's first Roadblock, one team member had to ride a zipline across the Calgary Stampede's grandstand and drop two rings onto a barrel to receive their next clue.
- After the first Roadblock, teams had to travel to Smithbilt Hats and deliver a total of 30 cowboy hat to five locations in Inglewood to receive their next clue. Teams then had to travel to McMahon Stadium, where one team member had to launch a T-shirt across the stadium using a T-shirt cannon through a field goal post held by their partner. Once complete, teams found their next clue on the T-shirt.
- In this season's final Roadblock, the team member who did not perform the previous Roadblock had to memorize the footwork for a drumline routine and then march alongside the Calgary Stampede Showband while mock playing a snare drum to receive their next clue.
- After the second Roadblock, teams had to travel to Heritage Park Historical Village for their final memory challenge. There, teams had to search the village for 30 items that they encountered on the race and arrange them onto sets of posts corresponding to each of the ten legs so that each set had three items to receive their final clue, which directed them to the finish line: the All Canada Ring of Spruce Meadows. The correct answers were:

Correct answers
Leg	Cities	Items		
1	Whistler; Squamish	Shovel	Metal box	Conch
2	Kelowna	Flag	Turtle puzzle tile	Irrigation pipe connector
3	Falkland; Jasper	Calf ribbon	Menu	Trowel
4	Montreal	Plant	Disco ball	Plate
5	Peterborough; Kawartha Lakes	Bolas	Turtle brush	Butter tart box
6	Scarborough; Markham	Table tennis ball	Script	Coffee cup
7	Sarnia	Pumpjack model	Chain	Cricket ball
8	Digby; Saint John	Scallop shucking knife	Headphones	Concrete trowel
9	Gimli; Winnipeg	Spelling bee microphone	Activate wristband	Pergola pegs
10	Calgary	Metal ring	Field goal connector joint	Drumsticks

== Ratings ==
The twelfth season of The Amazing Race Canada had an average viewership of 1.1 million.
