= The Amazing Race Canada =

Canadian adventure reality game show

- The title card used since season 3 (excluding the Heroes Edition)
- Genre: Reality competition
- Created by: Elise Doganieri; Bertram van Munster
- Based on: The Amazing Race by: Bertram van Munster; Elise Doganieri
- Creative director: Shannon McGinn
- Presented by: Jon Montgomery
- Theme music composer: John M. Keane
- Country of origin: Canada
- Original language: English
- No. of seasons: 12
- No. of episodes: 121 (and 1 recap and 6 reunion specials)

Production
- Executive producers: Mark Lysakowski; John Brunton; Barbara Bowlby
- Running time: 44–47 minutes
- Production companies: Insight Productions; Bell Media

Original release
- Network: CTV
- Release: July 15, 2013 – present

Related
- International versions

The Amazing Race Canada is a Canadian reality competition show based on the American series The Amazing Race. Following the premise of other versions in the Amazing Race franchise, the show follows teams of two as they race across Canada and around the world. Each season is split into legs, with teams tasked to deduce clues, navigate themselves in foreign areas, interact with locals, perform physical and mental challenges, and travel by air, boat, car, taxi, and other modes of transport. Teams are progressively eliminated at the end of most legs for being the last to arrive at designated Pit Stops. The first team to arrive at the Finish Line wins a grand prize of CA$250,000 and a trip around the world.

Commissioned and broadcast by CTV, The Amazing Race Canada is hosted by former Olympian Jon Montgomery, produced by Insight Productions in association with Bell Media and with the support of Profiles Television. The first season aired in the summer of 2013, with the show continuing on a yearly basis – with seasons being produced each spring and airing each summer, except for a 2-year hiatus during the COVID-19 pandemic. As of 2026, twelve seasons have aired with a thirteenth season set to air in 2027.

== The Race ==
The Amazing Race Canada is a reality television competition between at least nine teams of two. Each season is divided into a number of legs wherein teams travel and complete various tasks to obtain clues to help them progress to a Pit Stop, where they are given a chance to rest and recover before starting the next leg twelve hours later. The first team to arrive at a Pit Stop is often awarded a prize while the last team is normally eliminated (except in non-elimination legs). The final leg of each race is run by the last three remaining teams, and the first to arrive at the final destination wins the grand prize consisting of CA$250,000 cash and a trip around the world.

On the airdate of the first season finale it was announced that CTV had ordered another season of The Amazing Race Canada. Casting began in fall 2013 and the second season aired in summer 2014. New to the eligibility requirements for season 2 were clauses that applicants must possess a valid Canadian passport, and be able to travel not only within Canada but around the world; this meant that, unlike the first season, the show travelled to destinations outside of Canada, closer to its American counterpart.

In the second season, Petro-Canada joined as the show's fuel sponsor with the team winning a lifetime supply of gasoline; Scotiabank was the season's financial sponsor. In the third season, the Bank of Montreal (BMO) replaced Scotiabank as the show's financial sponsor. In the fourth season, Air Canada, the show's trip sponsor for the first three seasons, was replaced by Hotels.com; Petro-Canada ended its sponsorship. In the fifth season, Sinorama replaced Hotels.com as the show's trip sponsor. In the sixth season, the financial and trip sponsors were removed, and Dempster's Bakery began their sponsorship. In the seventh season, Expedia became the show's new trip sponsor, while Shell Canada's V-Power became the show's new fuel sponsor. In the eighth season, Shell Canada and Dempster's Bakery ended their financial support, while Desjardins Group, Subway, Destination BC, GURU Organic Energy, Tourism Richmond, Trans Canada Trail and Marshalls started their sponsorships, with the trip around the world prize for the final leg funded by GURU Organic Energy drinks. In the ninth season, Samsung funded the final leg's cash prize, while Subway and Marshalls ended their commercial support. In the tenth season, GURU Organic Energy and Samsung ended their financial support, while Boost joined as a new energy drink sponsor. In the eleventh season, FUZE Iced Tea funded the final leg's cash prize. After the eleventh season, Chevrolet, the provider of the vehicles since the series' inception, ended its financial support.

=== Teams ===
Each team is composed of two individuals who have some type of relationship to each other. A total of 244 contestants have participated in The Amazing Race Canada.

=== Route Markers ===
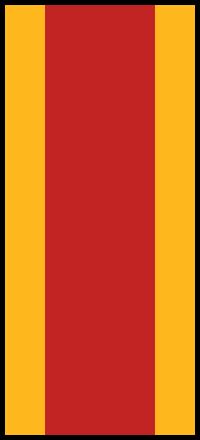

Route Markers are yellow and red flags that mark the places where teams must go. Most Route Markers are attached to the boxes that contain clue envelopes, but some may mark places where teams must go in order to complete tasks, or may be used to line a course that the teams must follow.

=== Clues ===
Clues are found throughout the legs in sealed envelopes, normally inside clue boxes. They give teams the information they need and tasks they need to do for them to progress.

- Route Info: A general clue that may include a task to be completed by the team before receiving their next clue.
- Detour: A choice of two tasks. Teams can choose either task and can swap tasks if they find one option too difficult.
- Roadblock: A task only one team member can complete. Teams must choose which member will challenge the task based on a brief clue about the task before fully revealing the details of the task.
- Fast Forward: A task that only one team may complete, allowing that team to skip all remaining tasks and head directly for the next Pit Stop. Teams may only claim one Fast Forward during the entire race.
- 150 Challenge: A series of special challenges during season 5 to commemorate the 150th anniversary of the Confederation of Canada. They did not affect gameplay mechanics except for their relevance in that season's Final Memory Challenge.
- Switchback: A series of challenges during season 10, in which notable challenges from past seasons are encountered. They commemorated the 10th anniversary of the series and had no effect on gameplay mechanics.

=== Obstacles ===
Teams may encounter the following that may affect their position:

- U-Turn: An obstacle where a team can force another trailing team to complete the other option of the Detour they did not select. Teams may use their ability to U-Turn another team more than once throughout each season (as opposed to the American version, which allows only one), as shown in season 3 when Gino & Jesse U-Turned two teams.
- Face Off: An obstacle which has all the teams, two at a time, compete against each other in a specific task. The winning teams are gradually given the next clue, while the final losing team must wait out a 15-minute penalty before receiving the next clue. This was introduced in season 3.
- One Way: An obstacle where a team can force another trailing team to complete one specific option of the Detour. This was introduced in season 7.
- Pass: An obstacle where a team can force a team to wait for another team to get that clue on the pass sign before continuing to race. This was introduced in season 8.
- Intersection: An obstacle that indicates two teams must complete further tasks together until a clue indicates that they are no longer joined. This was introduced in season 12.

=== Legs ===
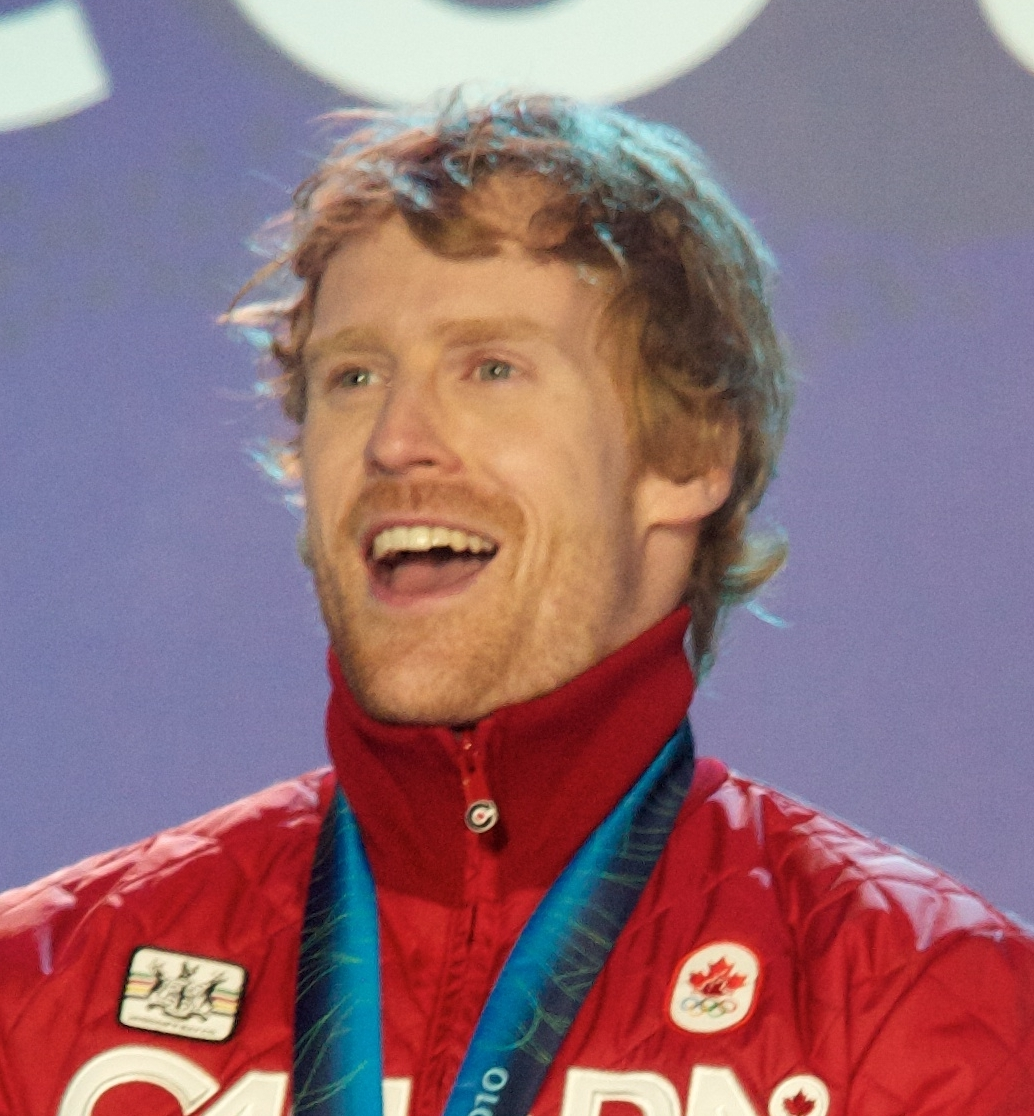
Host Jon Montgomery

At the beginning of each leg, teams receive an allowance of cash, usually in Canadian dollars, to cover expenses during the legs (except for the purchase of airline tickets, which are paid-for by credit cards provided to the teams).

Teams then have to follow clues and Route Markers that will lead them to the various destinations and tasks they will face. Modes of travel between these destinations include commercial and chartered airplanes (which for the first three seasons were generally provided by sponsor Air Canada), boats, trains, taxis, buses, and rented vehicles provided by the show, or the teams may simply travel by foot. Each leg ends with a twelve-hour Pit Stop where teams are able to rest and where teams that arrives last are progressively eliminated until only three teams remain. Most legs comprise three or more challenges, often a Roadblock, Detour and a Route Info Task. The first teams to arrive at the Pit Stop win prizes, usually from the show's sponsors.

- The Express Pass allows any team holding it to skip any one task.

In seasons 1, 2, and 8, a number of Express Passes bundled together was awarded to the winners of the first leg of the race; the team that won the Passes must give the other(s) away by a certain later point. In season 1, Kristen & Darren won two Express Passes, one for themselves and gave the second one to Vanessa & Celina. Kristen & Darren ultimately did not use theirs; Vanessa & Celina used their Express Pass to bypass the Detour in Leg 4. In season 2, Natalie & Meaghan won two Express Passes, one for themselves and gave the second one to Pierre & Michel. Natalie & Meaghan used their Express Pass to bypass the Detour in Leg 3; Pierre & Michel used their Express Pass to bypass the Roadblock in Leg 6. In season 8, Brendan & Connor won three Express Passes, one for themselves and gave one to Jesse & Marika and another to Franca & Nella. Brendan & Connor and Franca & Nella used their Express Passes to bypass the same final task in Leg 7; Jesse & Marika used their Express Pass to bypass the Detour in Leg 6.

In seasons 3 and 4, the Express Pass was given out in an optional task in Leg 2 right before the Detour, allowing any team to possibly win it rather than it being a definite award for a first-place finish on the leg. In season 3, Hamilton & Michaelia won two passes, one for themselves and gave the second one to Brent & Sean. Hamilton & Michaelia immediately used their Express Pass to bypass the Detour in Leg 2; Brent & Sean used their Express Pass to bypass a task in Leg 7. In season 4, Steph & Kristen won two passes, one for themselves and gave the second one to Frankie & Amy. Steph & Kristen ultimately did not use theirs; Frankie & Amy used their Express Pass to bypass the Roadblock in Leg 6.

In season 5, three separate Express Passes were available to be found during the Roadblock in Leg 2, allowing any three teams to possibly win one; or a team could win more than one Express Pass, but they must give the other(s) away by the end of Leg 3. Kenneth & Ryan found all three Passes, they gave one to Karen & Bert as a reward for help in a task later in Leg 2, and gave the other to Megan & Courtney early in Leg 3. Kenneth & Ryan used their Express Pass to bypass the Detour in Leg 3; Karen & Bert used their Express Pass to bypass a task in Leg 3; Megan & Courtney ultimately did not use theirs.

In season 6 (Heroes Edition), three separate Express Passes were available to be found during a task in Leg 2, allowing any three teams to possibly win one. Todd & Anna, Leanne & Mar and Nancy & Melissa each won an Express Pass. Todd & Anna and Leanne & Mar used their Express Passes to bypass the same task in Leg 3; Nancy & Melissa used their Express Pass to bypass a later task in Leg 3.

In season 7, three separate Express Passes were awarded; two to the winners of Leg 1, and one to the winners of Leg 2. The team who won two Express Passes on Leg 1 must give one away by the end of Leg 3. Dave & Irina won Leg 1 and two Passes; Aarthy & Thinesh won the third Pass as a reward for winning Leg 2. Dave & Irina gave their other pass to Anthony & James early in Leg 3. Dave & Irina used their Express Pass to bypass the second Roadblock in Leg 4; Anthony & James used their Express Pass to bypass the first Roadblock in Leg 4; Aarthy & Thinesh ultimately did not use theirs.

In season 9, three Express Passes bundled together were available to be found in an optional task in Leg 1 right before the Roadblock, allowing any team to possibly win them rather than the Passes being a definite award for a first-place finish on the leg. Ty & Kat found the three Passes, one for themselves and two to be given away by the end of Leg 3; they gave one to Tyler & Kayleen during the first task of Leg 2, and another to Ben & Anwar after the Roadblock in Leg 3. Ty & Kat used their Express Pass to bypass the Detour in Leg 6; Tyler & Kayleen and Ben & Anwar used their Express Passes to bypass the first Roadblock in Leg 6.

In seasons 10 and 11, three Express Passes; two bundled together and one separate, were available to be found in an optional task in Leg 2. In season 10, Michael & Tyson won two Express Passes, one for themselves, and another to be given away by the end of Leg 4; they gave one to Lauren & Nicole after the second Roadblock in Leg 4. Michael & Amari won the third Express Pass. Michael & Tyson used their Express Pass to bypass a task in Leg 5; Lauren & Nicole used their Express Pass to bypass the Detour in Leg 6; Michael & Amari used their Express Pass to bypass the second Roadblock in Leg 6. In season 11, Osas & Esosa found one Express Pass, while Louis & Marie found the other two Passes, one for themselves and another to be given away by the end of Leg 4; they gave one to Jesse & Jonathon in the middle of Leg 3. Osas & Esosa used their Express Pass to bypass a task in Leg 2; Louis & Marie used their Express Pass to bypass a task in Leg 3; Jesse & Jonathon used their Express Pass to bypass the Detour in Leg 3.

In season 12, ten separate Express Passes were available to be found at the first task of the race, allowing every team to retrieve one. All teams had until the fifth leg to use their Express Pass; once one Express Pass is redeemed on one challenge, it cannot be used for that challenge again.

- The Assist allows a team to skip part of a pre-selected task in a leg.

In season 9, one Assist was given to each team at the start of the race. All teams had until the sixth leg to use their Assist.

In seasons 10, 11, and 12, one Assist was randomly hidden in a clue at a particular task during a leg. The team that found it had to use it for that clue's task.

==== Non-elimination legs ====
Each race (with the exception of the tenth season) has a number of predetermined non-elimination legs, in which the last team to arrive at the Pit Stop is not eliminated and is allowed to continue. The non-eliminated team is required to do a Speed Bump – a penalty task that only the team saved from elimination on the previous leg must complete before continuing on.

=== Rules and penalties ===
Most of the rules and penalties are adopted from the American edition.

== Seasons ==
The show first aired in 2013 with the first season premiere airing on July 15, 2013 and ending on September 16, 2013.

Season	Broadcast		Winners	Teams
Season	Premiere	Finale	Winners	Teams
1	July 15, 2013	September 16, 2013	Tim Hague, Sr. & Tim Hague, Jr.	9
2	July 8, 2014	September 21, 2014	Mickey Henry & Pete Schmalz	11
3	July 8, 2015	September 23, 2015	Gino & Jesse Montani	12
4	June 28, 2016	September 13, 2016	Steph LeClair & Kristen McKenzie	10
5	July 4, 2017	September 12, 2017	Sam Lambert & Paul Mitskopoulos	10
6	July 3, 2018	September 11, 2018	Courtney Berglind & Adam Kovacs	10
7	July 2, 2019	September 10, 2019	Anthony Johnson & James Makokis	10
8	July 5, 2022	September 20, 2022	Catherine Wreford & Craig Ramsay	10
9	July 4, 2023	September 19, 2023	Ty Smith & Kat Kastner	10
10	July 2, 2024	September 10, 2024	Taylor McPherson & Katie Mulkay	11
11	July 8, 2025	September 16, 2025	Jesse Harink & Jonathon Braun	11
12	July 7, 2026	September 15, 2026	Tina & Liz Liao	10

== Places visited ==
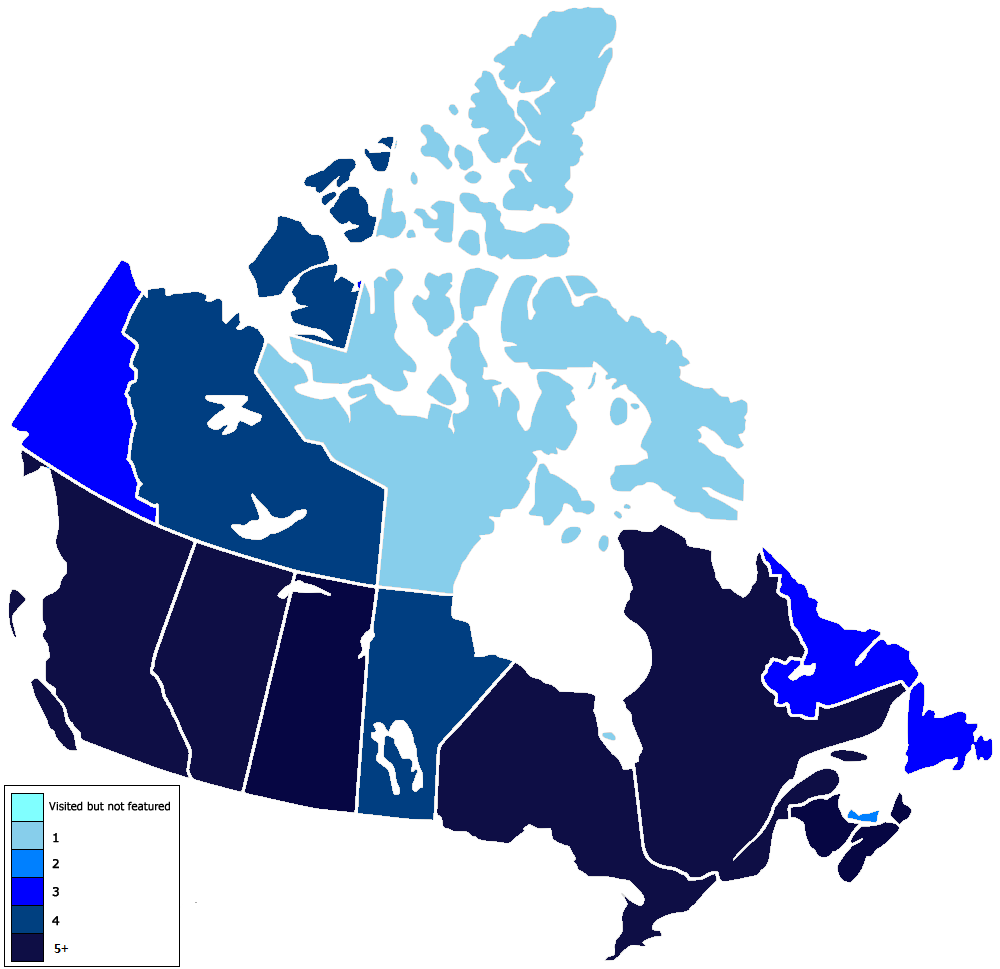
Provinces and territories visited in The Amazing Race Canada as of Season 11.

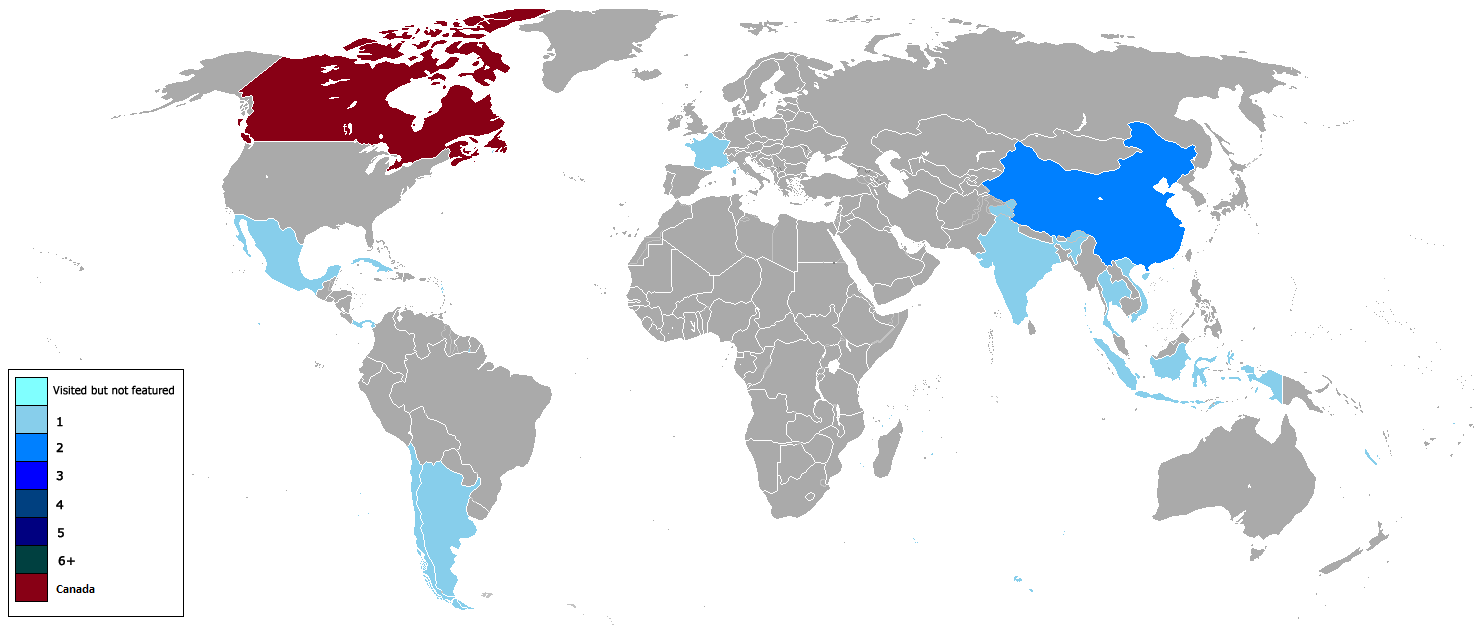
Countries visited in The Amazing Race Canada as of Season 6. In Season 1, and from Season 7 onward, the show was set entirely in Canada.

As of the tenth season, The Amazing Race Canada has visited all of Canada's provinces and territories, in addition to eleven foreign countries in Asia, Europe, South America and North America.^{1}

The following are the number of times places (including Canadian provinces and territories) are featured in The Amazing Race Canada.

=== Canada ===
Rank	Jurisdiction	Seasons Visited	Pit Stops
1	Alberta	12 (1, 2, 3, 4, 5, 6, 7, 8, 9, 10, 11, 12)	14^{4}
1	British Columbia	12 (1, 2, 3, 4, 5, 6, 7, 8, 9, 10, 11, 12)	29^{3}
1	Ontario	12 (1, 2, 3, 4, 5, 6, 7, 8, 9, 10, 11, 12)	26^{5}
4	Quebec	11 (1, 2, 3, 4, 5, 7, 8, 9, 10, 11, 12)	12^{3}
5	New Brunswick	6 (2, 4, 6, 8, 10, 12)	6
5	Nova Scotia	6 (1, 3, 4, 7, 9, 12)	5^{2}
7	Saskatchewan	5 (1, 3, 5, 7, 10)	4
8	Manitoba	4 (2, 6, 9, 10)	4
8	Northwest Territories	4 (1, 4, 7, 11)	2
10	Newfoundland and Labrador	3 (1, 5, 11)	3
10	Yukon	3 (1, 2, 6)	3
12	Prince Edward Island	2 (2, 6)	2
13	Nunavut	1 (1)	1

=== International ===
Rank	Country	Continent	Seasons Visited	Pit Stops
1	China	Asia	2 (2, 5)	3^{6}
2	Argentina	South America	1 (3)	1
2	Chile	South America	1 (3)	1
2	Cuba	North America	1 (4)	1
2	France	Europe	1 (2)	2
2	India	Asia	1 (3)	2
2	Indonesia	Asia	1 (6)	1
2	Mexico	North America	1 (6)	1
2	Panama	North America	1 (5)	1
2	Thailand	Asia	1 (5)	1
2	Vietnam	Asia	1 (4)	2

Notes

1. This count only includes provinces and territories that fielded actual Route Markers, tasks & challenges, or Pit Stops. Transport stopovers and connecting flights are not counted or listed.
2. Includes 1 Finish Line.
3. Includes 2 Finish Lines.
4. Includes 3 Finish Lines.
5. Includes 4 Finish Lines.
6. Including the Special Administrative Regions of Hong Kong (2) and Macau (2).

== Reception ==
=== Ratings ===
Until August 28, 2022, all ratings data was provided by Numeris.

Season	Timeslot (ET)	Episodes	Premiered		Ended		Rank	Viewers (in millions)
Season	Timeslot (ET)	Episodes	Date	Premiere Viewers (in millions)	Date	Finale Viewers (in millions)	Rank	Viewers (in millions)
1	Monday 9:00 PM	10	July 15, 2013	2.986	September 16, 2013	3.056	#1	2.851
2	Tuesday 9:00 PM	12	July 8, 2014	2.764	September 21, 2014	3.026	#1	2.751
3	Wednesday 9:00 PM	12	July 8, 2015	2.596	September 23, 2015	2.601	#1	2.541
4	Tuesday 8:00 PM	12	June 28, 2016	2.053	September 13, 2016	2.144	#1	UND
5	Tuesday 8:00 PM	11	July 4, 2017	1.888	September 12, 2017	1.961	#1	UND
6	Tuesday 8:00 PM	11	July 3, 2018	1.771	September 11, 2018	1.989	#1	UND
7	Tuesday 9:00 PM	11	July 2, 2019	2.029	September 10, 2019	2.134	#1	UND
8	Tuesday 9:00 PM	11	July 5, 2022	1.695	September 20, 2022	UND	UND	UND

== Awards and nominations ==
=== Canadian Screen Awards ===
Year	Category	Nominee	Result	Reference
2014	Best Cross-Platform Project, Non-Fiction - The Amazing Race Canada Interactive	Chris Skinner, CJ Hervey, James Milward, Pietro Gagliano and Ryan Andal	Won	
2014	Best Photography in a Lifestyle or Reality/Competition Program or Series	Peter Rieveschl and Ryan Shaw (for "Where in the World Is Ogopogo?")	Won	
2014	Best Writing in a Lifestyle or Reality/Competition Program or Series	Mark Lysakowski and Rob Brunner (for "Where in the World Is Ogopogo?")	Won	
2015	Best Direction in a Reality/Competition Program or Series	Rob Brunner (for "What's It Take to Get a Cup of Tea?")	Won	
2015	Best Picture Editing in a Reality/Competition Program or Series	Jonathan Dowler, Al Manson, Kyle Martin, Seth Poulin and Michael Tersigni (for "What's It Take to Get a Cup of Tea?")	Won	
2015	Best Reality/Competition Program or Series	Eric Abboud, Mike Bickerton, Barbara Bowlby, John Brunton and Mark Lysakowski	Won	
2015	Best Writing in a Lifestyle or Reality/Competition Program or Series	Rob Brunner and Mark Lysakowski (for "What's It Take to Get a Cup of Tea?")	Won	
2015	Golden Screen Award for TV Reality Show		Won	
2016	Best Host in a Variety, Lifestyle, Reality/Competition, or Talk Program or Series	Jon Montgomery	Won	
2016	Best Direction in a Reality/Competition Program or Series	Rob Brunner (for "Penticton/Osoyoos")	Won	
2016	Best Photography in a Lifestyle or Reality/Competition Program or Series	Ryan Shaw (for "Take Your Clue and Gooo!")	Won	
2016	Best Picture Editing in a Reality/Competition Program or Series	Jonathan Dowler, Ben O'Neil, Burak Ozgan, Seth Poulin and Michael Tersigni (for "Who's Feeling Sporty Now")	Won	
2016	Best Reality/Competition Program or Series	Daniela Battistella, Mike Bickerton, Robyn Bigue, Barbara Bowlby, John Brunton, Ann Camilleri, Guy Clarkson, Sarah James, Mark Lysakowski, Kyle Martin and Catherine Petersen	Won	
2016	Golden Screen Award for TV Reality Show		Won	
2017	Best Reality/Competition Program or Series	John Brunton, Barbara Bowlby, Mark Lysakowski, Mike Bickerton, Sarah James, Kyle Martin, Robyn Bigue, Guy Clarkson, Ann Camilleri, Steff Millman and Catherine Petersen	Won	
2017	Best Direction in a Reality/Competition Program or Series	Rob Brunner (for "For Those About to Rock")	Won	
2017	Best Photography in a Lifestyle or Reality/Competition Program or Series	Ryan Shaw (for "Who's Ready to Let It All Hang Out?")	Won	
2017	Best Picture Editing in a Reality/Competition Program or Series	Mike Tersigni, Al Manson, Jonathan Dowler, Dave McMahon, Ryan Monteith and Cynthia Flengeris (for "Who's Ready to Let It All Hang Out?")	Nominated	
2017	Best Picture Editing in a Reality/Competition Program or Series	Mike Tersigni, Ben O’Neil, Burak Ozgan, Jonathan Dowler and Allan Hughes (for "Second Place Isn't Good Enough")	Won	
2017	Best Sound in a Non-Fiction Program or Series	Mark Krupka (for "Shine Your Light")	Nominated	
2017	Best Writing in a Lifestyle or Reality/Competition Program or Series	Mark Lysakowski, Rob Brunner and Jennifer Pratt (for "Toads! Are You Kidding Me?")	Won	
2017	Golden Screen Award for TV Reality Show		Won	
2018	Best Reality/Competition Program or Series	John Brunton, Barbara Bowlby, Mark Lysakowski, Mike Bickerton, Sarah James, Kyle Martin, Robyn Bigue, Guy Clarkson, Ann Camilleri, Steff Millman and Catherine Petersen	Won	
2018	Best Photography in a Lifestyle or Reality/Competition Program or Series	Ryan Shaw (for "Can I See Your Kuna?")	Won	
2018	Best Picture Editing in a Reality/Competition Program or Series	Al Manson, Jonathan Dowler, Clare Elson, John Niedzielski, Jay Prychidny, Jordan Wood and Michael Tersigni (for "Canada's Coming Together Like a Piece of Cake")	Won	
2018	Best Picture Editing in a Reality/Competition Program or Series	Michael Tersigni, Jonathan Dowler, Cynthia Flengeris, Clare Elson, David Yenovkian and Wesley Finucan (for "Who Wants to Be the Python?")	Nominated	
2018	Best Direction in a Reality/Competition Program or Series	Rob Brunner (for "Canada's Coming Together Like a Piece of Cake")	Won	
2018	Best Writing in a Lifestyle or Reality/Competition Program or Series	Mark Lysakowski, Jennifer Pratt and Rob Brunner (for "We Just Saw Johnny Mustard")	Won	
2018	Best Writing in a Lifestyle or Reality/Competition Program or Series	Mark Lysakowski, Rob Brunner and Matthew Hanson (for "Can I See Your Kuna?")	Nominated	
2018	Golden Screen Award for TV Reality Show		Won	
2019	Best Reality/Competition Program or Series	John Brunton, Barbara Bowlby, Mark Lysakowski, Mike Bickerton, Sarah James, Kyle Martin, Robyn Bigue, Guy Clarkson, Ann Camilleri, Steff Millman and Catherine Petersen	Won	
2019	Best Photography in a Lifestyle or Reality/Competition Program or Series	Ryan Shaw (for "The Summer of Heroes")	Won	
2019	Best Picture Editing in a Reality/Competition Program or Series	Michael Tersigni, Jonathan Dowler, Clare Elson, Owin Lambeck, Gloria Tong and David Yenovkian (for "Just a Beaver Hero")	Won	
2019	Best Direction in a Reality/Competition Program or Series	Rob Brunner (for "Sounds Like a Wild Boar")	Won	
2019	Best Writing in a Lifestyle or Reality/Competition Program or Series	Mark Peacock, Rob Brunner and Mark Lysakowski (for "Just a Beaver Hero")	Nominated	
2019	Best Writing in a Lifestyle or Reality/Competition Program or Series	Paulina Robak (for "Sounds Like a Wild Boar")	Nominated	
2019	Golden Screen Award for TV Reality Show		Won	
2020	Best Reality/Competition Program or Series	John Brunton, Barbara Bowlby, Mark Lysakowski, Mike Bickerton, Sarah James, Kyle Martin, Robyn Bigue, Guy Clarkson, Ann Camilleri, Steff Millman and Catherine Petersen	Won	
2020	Best Host in a Variety, Lifestyle, Reality/Competition, or Talk Program or Series	Jon Montgomery	Won	
2020	Best Photography in a Lifestyle or Reality/Competition Program or Series	Ryan Shaw (for "Clamageddon Continues")	Won	
2020	Best Picture Editing in a Reality/Competition Program or Series	Michael Tersigni, Mike Scott, Matthew Walsh, Clare Elson and Lisa Barley (for "Canada Get More Maps")	Won	
2020	Best Sound for Non-Fiction	Mark Krupka, Lisa Meitin and Ben Doner (for "Canada Get More Maps")	Won	
2020	Achievement in Casting	Michael Yerxa and Jesse Storey	Nominated	
2020	Best Writing in a Lifestyle or Reality/Competition Program or Series	Mark Lysakowski, Mark Peacock and Rob Brunner (for "Canada Get More Maps")	Won	
2020	Golden Screen Award for TV Reality Show		Won	
2020	Best Digital Live Production for Social Media	The Amazing Race Canada: Live from the Starting Line	Nominated	
2023	Reality/Competition series	John Brunton, Mark Lysakowski, Bertram van Munster, Elise Doganieri, Sarah James, Vanessa Rennard, Robyn Bigue, Ann Camilleri, Guy Clarkson, Catherine Petersen, Jesse Storey, Michael Tersigni, Jeff Thrasher, Mike Yerxa, Anthony Matkovic, Marc Poirier	Won	
2023	Casting, Non-fiction	Jesse Storey and Michael Yerxa	Nominated	
2023	Editing in a reality or competition program or series	Michael Tersigni and Samantha Shields (for "Where Is Gurmail")	Won	
2023	Sound in a lifestyle, reality or entertainment program or series	Mark Krupka, Brian Gallant and Lisa Meitin (for "Is That a Wild Peacock?")	Nominated	
2023	Directing, Reality/competition	Rob Brunner (for "Where Is Gurmail")	Nominated	
2023	Writing, Lifestyle or reality/competition	Rob Brunner, Mark Lysakowski and Josh Tizel (for "Is That a Wild Peacock?")	Nominated	

== See also ==
- Canada's Ultimate Challenge
- In Real Life
