= Miss Universe Canada 2019 =

- Date: August 17, 2019
- Presenters: Sonny Borrelli; Chelsae Durocher
- Venue: John Bassett Theatre, Metro Toronto Convention Centre, Toronto, Ontario
- Entrants: 55
- Placements: 20
- Winner: Alyssa Boston (Ontario) Tecumseh
- Congeniality: Deanna Bailey; South Ontario
- Photogenic: Tysia Suzuki (British Columbia) Pacific Coast

Miss Universe Canada 2019 was the 17th Miss Universe Canada pageant, held on August 17, 2019, at the John Bassett Theatre in the Metro Toronto Convention Centre in Toronto, Ontario. Marta Stepien of South Ontario crowned Alyssa Boston of Tecumseh at the end of the event. Alyssa represented Canada at Miss Universe 2019, while the first runner-up represented Canada at Miss International 2019, the second runner-up represented Canada in Reinado Internacional del Café 2019, and Aiona Santana represented Canada in Egypt as the First Miss Eco Teen Canada | Miss Eco Teen Canada 2019.

== Final results ==
| Final results | Contestant | International Placement |
|---|---|---|
| Miss Universe Canada 2019 | (Ontario) Tecumseh – Alyssa Boston | Unplaced – Miss Universe 2019 |
| 1st Runner-Up (Miss International Canada 2019) | Montreal – Megha Sandhu | Unplaced – Miss International 2019 |
| 2nd Runner-Up | Ontario Province – Sasha Lombardi | |
| 3rd Runner-Up | Northeast Toronto – Bianca Foo | |
| 4th Runner-Up | Central Ontario – Svetlana Mamaeva | |
| Top 10 | British Columbia Province – Sara Winter; (British Columbia) Pacific Coast – Tysia Suzuki; South Toronto – Rita Houkayem; West Canada – Kara Granger; West Ontario – Silvia Morar | |
| Top 20 | (Ontario) Brampton – Carmelle Martínez; Calgary – Alysha Ortiz; East Canada – Tiyana Cackovic; (Ontario) London – Jacqueline Wojciechowski; (Alberta) Lower Canada – Raman Sawhney; Northeast Canada – Karema Batotele; Northwest Ontario – Alice Li; (Ontario) West Central – Gabriella Walker; (British Columbia) West Coast – Natasha Smith; West Toronto – Miriam Mattova | |

=== Special awards ===
| Award | Contestant |
|---|---|
| Miss Eco Teen Canada | |
| Miss Photogenic | (British Columbia) Pacific Coast – Tysia Suzuki |
| Miss Congeniality | South Ontario – Deanna Bailey |

== Contestants ==
The 55 national delegates competing for the title of Miss Universe Canada 2019:

| Represents | Contestant | Height | Hometown |
|---|---|---|---|
| Alberta Province | Mattea Henderson | 1.73 m (5 ft 8 in) | Calgary |
| (Ontario) Atlantic Coast | Jamie Pfiefer | 1.74 m (5 ft 9 in) | Cottam |
| (Ontario) Brampton | Carmelle Martínez | 1.75 m (5 ft 9 in) | Brampton |
| British Columbia Province | Sara Winter | 1.78 m (5 ft 10 in) | Duncan |
| (British Columbia) Burnaby | Shawdi Safari | 1.65 m (5 ft 5 in) | Burnaby |
| Calgary | Alysha Ortiz | 1.71 m (5 ft 7 in) | Calgary |
| (Ontario) Cambridge | Sam Sing | 1.71 m (5 ft 7 in) | Cambridge |
| Central Canada | Moulika Sharma | 1.66 m (5 ft 5 in) | Brampton |
| Central Ontario | Svetlana Mamaeva | 1.80 m (5 ft 11 in) | Maple |
| East Canada | Tiyana Cackovic | 1.73 m (5 ft 8 in) | Hamilton |
| (Ontario) East Coast | Azarria Saleem | 1.65 m (5 ft 5 in) | Windsor |
| East Ontario | Grace Diamani | 1.79 m (5 ft 10 in) | Whitby |
| East Toronto | Whitney Serwaam | 1.76 m (5 ft 9 in) | Toronto |
| Edmonton | Jean Nicole de Jesus | 1.68 m (5 ft 6 in) | Edmonton |
| (Ontario) Erie | Melissa Jacobs | 1.77 m (5 ft 10 in) | Leamington |
| (Yukon) Klondike | Sophia Berck | 1.71 m (5 ft 7 in) | Whitehorse |
| (Ontario) London | Jacqueline Wojciechowski | 1.72 m (5 ft 8 in) | London |
| Lower Canada | Raman Sawhney | 1.68 m (5 ft 6 in) | Calgary |
| (Ontario) Mississauga | Theodora Giovannelli | 1.72 m (5 ft 8 in) | Mississauga |
| Montreal | Megha Sandhu | 1.77 m (5 ft 10 in) | Montreal |
| National Capital Region | Aiona Santana | 1.68 m (5 ft 6 in) | Ottawa |
| North Canada | Christina Logan | 1.70 m (5 ft 7 in) | Keswick |
| North Ontario | Hajaratu Jalloh | 1.66 m (5 ft 5 in) | North Burnaby |
| North Toronto | Elisha Jolly | 1.67 m (5 ft 6 in) | Toronto |
| Northeast Canada | Karema Batotele | 1.75 m (5 ft 9 in) | Ottawa |
| Northeast Ontario | Jennifer Zheng | 1.76 m (5 ft 9 in) | Oakville |
| Northeast Toronto | Bianca Foo | 1.75 m (5 ft 9 in) | Toronto |
| Northwest Ontario | Roxanne Bilski | 1.76 m (5 ft 9 in) | Chatham |
| Northwest Toronto | Alice Li | 1.76 m (5 ft 9 in) | Toronto |
| Ontario Province | Sasha Lombardi | 1.72 m (5 ft 8 in) | Toronto |
| (British Columbia) Pacific Coast | Tysia Suzuki | 1.68 m (5 ft 6 in) | Burnaby |
| (Ontario) Point Pelee | Kaitlyn Pecaski | 1.68 m (5 ft 6 in) | Tecumseh |
| Quebec Province | Jennifer Chirola | 1.75 m (5 ft 9 in) | Laval |
| South Alberta | Lisa Naveed | 1.68 m (5 ft 6 in) | Calgary |
| South Canada | Cailyn Prins | 1.71 m (5 ft 7 in) | Durham |
| South Ontario | Deanna Bailey | 1.71 m (5 ft 7 in) | Oakville |
| South Toronto | Rita Houkayem | 1.79 m (5 ft 10 in) | Toronto |
| Southeast Canada | Cephra Hasfal | 1.68 m (5 ft 6 in) | Brampton |
| Southeast Ontario | Mickey Proulx | 1.72 m (5 ft 8 in) | Markstay-Warren |
| Southeast Toronto | Daphne Vimalanathan | 1.74 m (5 ft 9 in) | Toronto |
| Southwest Canada | Raven Thiara | 1.70 m (5 ft 7 in) | New Westminster |
| Southwest Canada | Tanja Grubnic | 1.69 m (5 ft 7 in) | Winona |
| Southwest Ontario | Lovepreet Sidhu | 1.73 m (5 ft 8 in) | Brampton |
| (British Columbia) Surrey | Lesley Seitz | 1.65 m (5 ft 5 in) | Surrey |
| (Ontario) Tecumseh | Alyssa Boston | 1.73 m (5 ft 8 in) | Tecumseh |
| (Alberta) The Rockies | Medina Bandalli | 1.67 m (5 ft 6 in) | Edmonton |
| Upper Canada | Samantha Stokes | 1.72 m (5 ft 8 in) | High Prairie |
| Vancouver | Alexandra Yuan | 1.70 m (5 ft 7 in) | Vancouver |
| West Canada | Kara Granger | 1.76 m (5 ft 9 in) | Chilliwack |
| (Ontario) West Central | Gabriella Walker | 1.76 m (5 ft 9 in) | Tecumseh |
| (British Columbia) West Coast | Natasha Smith | 1.67 m (5 ft 6 in) | Coquitlam |
| West Ontario | Silvia Morar | 1.78 m (5 ft 10 in) | Windsor |
| West Toronto | Miriam Mattova | 1.75 m (5 ft 9 in) | Toronto |
| (Yukon) Whitehorse | Brittney Ann Williams | 1.78 m (5 ft 10 in) | Whitehorse |
| Yukon Territory | Marianne Lucas | 1.75 m (5 ft 9 in) | Whitehorse |
