= Jaime VandenBerg =

Canadian actress and beauty pageant titleholder

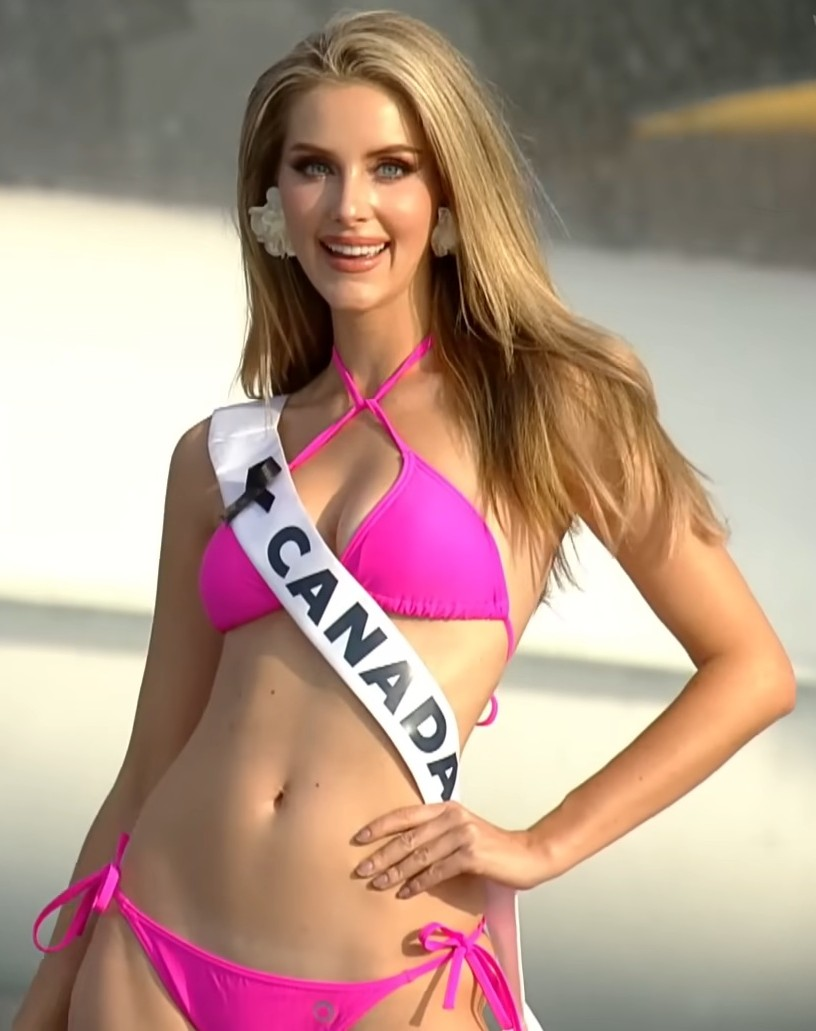
- VandenBerg in 2025
- Born: Jaime Yvonne VandenBerg; Lethbridge, Alberta, Canada
- Occupation: Actress
- Height: 5 ft 9 in (175 cm)
- Children: 1
- Beauty pageant titleholder
- Title: Miss Universe Canada 2025; Miss World Canada 2023; Miss International Canada 2020; Miss Earth Canada 2018; Miss Teenage Alberta 2014
- Major competitions: Miss World 2023; (Top 40); Miss Universe 2025; (Top 30)

Jaime Yvonne VandenBerg is a Canadian actress, and beauty pageant titleholder who won Miss Universe Canada 2025.

== Biography ==
VandenBerg spent much of her childhood in Coaldale, and graduated from the University of Lethbridge with a Bachelor of Arts in Philosophy, concentrating in legal reasoning. She applied to Law School in 2025.

== Early life ==
In 2021, after surviving gender-based violence in Colombia, she advocated and campaigned to raise funds and awareness for women's shelters in Canada and Mexico. She received the Diana Award for her advocacy.

In 2022, she co-founded Canadian Herstory, a non-profit focused on Canadian women's history, and received the Queen Elizabeth II Platinum Jubilee Medal for her community work.

In 2024, she launched Peaks for a Purpose under the Miss World Beauty with a Purpose program.

== Pageantry ==
VandenBerg had previously competed in the Miss Universe Canada pageant twice, first in 2015 and again in 2020. She withdrew from Miss Earth 2018, citing sexual harassment during the competition. In 2020, she was named Miss International Canada. However, due to the COVID-19 pandemic and the subsequent postponement of the Miss International pageant, she was unable to compete. On 3 October 2021, in Vaughan, Ontario, VandenBerg won Miss World Canada 2021, and went on to represent Canada at Miss World 2023, where she reached the top 40.

On 9 August 2025, in Windsor, Ontario, VandenBerg won Miss Universe Canada 2025. She represented Canada at Miss Universe 2025, and finished in the top 30. After the pageant, she revealed that she had competed while being 4 months pregnant. The Miss Universe Canada organization had relaxed its long-standing eligibility requirements in 2024 by eliminating the 28 year old age cap and allowing both mothers and married women to compete. On 2 March 2026, she announced that she was four months pregnant. VandenBerg kept the pregnancy a secret in order to keep the attention focused on her advocacy work. The timing of the pregnancy was reported to coincide with the Miss Universe 2025 competition period.

== Personal life ==
Vandenberg is in a relationship with Aaron Hernandez, and they have one child.

== Filmography ==
=== Television ===
Year	Title	Role	Notes	Ref.
2025	Vertical Series	Chloe	2 episodes	
2025	My Husband Sold Me to My Ex	Herself	TV Mini Series	

Awards and achievements
Preceded by Ashley Callingbull	Miss Universe Canada; 2025	Succeeded by Aslihan Morali
Preceded by Svetlana Mamaeva	Miss World Canada; 2023	Succeeded by Emma Morrison
