= Miss Universe Canada 2020 =

- Date: October 24, 2020
- Presenters: Sonny Borrelli; Chelsae Durocher
- Venue: John Bassett Theatre, Metro Toronto Convention Centre, Toronto
- Broadcaster: CTV
- Entrants: 40
- Placements: 20
- Winner: Nova Stevens; British Columbia
- Congeniality: Jenna Escobido
- Photogenic: Rosalie Mercier

The Miss Universe Canada 2020 was the 18th edition of Miss Universe Canada pageant. It was held on October 24, 2020 at John Bassett Theatre, Metro Toronto Convention Centre in Toronto. Alyssa Boston of Ontario crowned Nova Stevens of British Columbia as her successor at the end of the event. Stevens represented Canada at Miss Universe 2020, while first runner-up Tamara Jemuovic represented Canada at Miss International 2021 and second runner-up Jaime VandenBerg represented the country in Reinado Internacional del Café 2020 and 3rd runner-up Svetlana Mamaeva represented the country in Miss World 2021.

For the first time in history, the organization had 18 franchises for the provinces and territories and three cities of Canada, where they selected 55 candidates to participate in the national pageant.

== Final results ==
Final results	Contestant
Miss Universe Canada 2020	British Columbia – Nova Stevens
1st Runner-Up (Miss International Canada 2021) (Miss Universe Canada 2021)	Ontario – Tamara Jemuovic
2nd Runner-Up	Alberta – Jaime VandenBerg
3rd Runner-Up	Ontario – Svetlana Mamaeva
4th Runner-Up	Alberta – Sam Fraughton
Top 10	British Columbia – Sara Winter; Ontario – Kelsey Johnson; Ontario – Laetitia Nocera; Quebec – Christina Harb; Quebec – Dominique Doucette
Top 20	Alberta – Kathryn Legaspi; Alberta – Meera Patel; British Columbia – Nicole Pegler; Nova Scotia – Sophie Church; Ontario – Emily Lau; Ontario – Jacqueline Wojciechowski; Ontario – Kimberly Simpson; Ontario – Nicole Peters; Quebec – Kalika Hastings; Quebec – Neelam Patel

=== Special awards ===
Final results	Contestant
Star Quality Award	British Columbia – Evangeline Lou
Miss Photogenic	Quebec – Rosalie Mercier
Miss Congeniality	British Columbia – Jenna Escobido
Best Hair	Alberta – Meera Patel
Best Body	Ontario – Jacqueline Wojciechowski
Best Runway Model	British Columbia – Nova Stevens
Humanitarian Award	Ontario – Svetlana Mamaeva
People's Choice Award	Alberta – Kathryn Legaspi
People's Choice Award 1st Runner-Up	Quebec – Neelam Patel

== Delegates ==
Contestant	Height	Hometown	Notes
Aleria McKay	5 ft 9 in (1.75 m)	Six Nations	
Alice Bowyer	5 ft 6 in (1.68 m)	Calgary	
Arminta Thurairajah	5 ft 4 in (1.63 m)	Montreal	
Ashley Warrington	5 ft 5 in (1.65 m)	Grey County	
Ayla Tse	5 ft 4 in (1.63 m)	Montreal	
Brittany Rushton	5 ft 6 in (1.68 m)	Calgary	
Carmela Zarbo	5 ft 3 in (1.60 m)	Windsor, Ontario	
Cassidy Barry	5 ft 2 in (1.57 m)	Placentia	
Chantel Wiebe	5 ft 9 in (1.75 m)	High River	
Christina Harb	5 ft 5 in (1.65 m)	Montreal	
Christina Williams	5 ft 2 in (1.57 m)	Toronto	
Courtney Jones	5 ft 5 in (1.65 m)	Torbay	
Dominique Doucette	5 ft 8 in (1.73 m)	Quebec City	Previously Miss Canada 2015 [[Miss Teenager Universe 2015 ]] Miss Teenager Universe Photogenic Miss New Brunswick 2nd Runner Up 2014 Miss Salmon Festival 2014 [[Duchess of the Quebec Winter Carnaval 2018 ]]
Eleanor Abraham	5 ft 9 in (1.75 m)	Lunenburg	
Emily Lau	5 ft 8 in (1.73 m)	Toronto	
Evangeline Lou	5 ft 7 in (1.70 m)	Vancouver	
Faith Byers	5 ft 5 in (1.65 m)	Edmonton	
Ishpreet Gill	5 ft 9 in (1.75 m)	Ontario	
Jacqueline Juntilla Marsh	5 ft 11 in (1.80 m)	Thunder Bay	Previously Miss Earth Canada 2017
Jacqueline Wojciechowski	5 ft 8 in (1.73 m)	London	Previously Miss Canada Globe 2013 Miss Universe Canada 2017 Finalist Miss Universe Canada 2019 Top 20 Best Body
Jaime VandenBerg	5 ft 9 in (1.75 m)	Lethbridge	Previously Miss Earth Canada 2018 Miss Universe Canada 2015 Finalist Photogenic
Jenna Escobido	5 ft 6 in (1.68 m)	Vancouver	
Kalika Hastings	5 ft 9 in (1.75 m)	Montreal	
Kathryn Legaspi	5 ft 4 in (1.63 m)	Edmonton	
Kathy Spence	5 ft 7 in (1.70 m)	Toronto	
Kelsey Johnson	5 ft 11 in (1.80 m)	London	
Kimberly Simpson	5 ft 5 in (1.65 m)	Brampton	
Laetitia Nocera	5 ft 6 in (1.68 m)	Toronto	
Laila Zandi	5 ft 2 in (1.57 m)	North Vancouver	
Lauren Peters	5 ft 8 in (1.73 m)	Mississauga	Twin sister of contestant Nicole Peters
Marina Sabbithi	5 ft 6 in (1.68 m)	Montreal	
Meera Patel	5 ft 1 in (1.55 m)	Calgary	
Natasha Ahuja	5 ft 8 in (1.73 m)	Waterloo	
Neelam Patel	5 ft 2 in (1.57 m)	Dollard-des-Ormeaux	
Nicole Pegler	5 ft 5 in (1.65 m)	Vancouver	Miss Philippines International of British Columbia 2019
Nicole Peters	5 ft 8 in (1.73 m)	Mississauga	Twin sister of contestant Lauren Peters
Nova Stevens	6 ft 0 in (1.83 m)	Vancouver	Miss Universe Canada 2014 Top 12 Miss Universe Canada 2018 Top 20 Photogenic
Rosalie Mercier	4 ft 11 in (1.50 m)	Quebec City	
Sam Fraughton	5 ft 8 in (1.73 m)	Edmonton	Miss Universe Canada 2017 Top 20
Sara Winter	5 ft 10 in (1.78 m)	Duncan	Miss Universe Canada 2014 Top 20 Miss Universe Canada 2019 Top 10 Recently crowned Miss Grand Canada 2020
Sophie Church	5 ft 10 in (1.78 m)	Halifax	
Svetlana Mamaeva	5 ft 11 in (1.80 m)	Maple	Previously Miss Tourism World Canada 2019 Miss Universe Canada 2019 4th Runner Up Recently crowned Miss World Canada 2020/2021
Tamara Jemuovic	5 ft 8 in (1.73 m)	Toronto	Previously Miss Earth Canada 2016 Previously Miss Globe Canada 2019
Tasia Campbell	5 ft 6 in (1.68 m)	Calgary	
Tavleen Singh	5 ft 7 in (1.70 m)	Lethbridge	
