= D.O. (rapper) =

- Born: Duane Gibson
- Genre: Hip hop
- Occupations: Rapper, author
- Years active: 2000–present

D.O. (a.k.a. Defy the Odds; real name Duane Michael Gibson CM) is a Canadian rapper, motivational speaker and author. He is known for setting the Guinness World Record for the longest freestyle rap in 2003.

== Biography ==
D.O. studied at Toronto's York University and graduated with an honours English degree in 2001.

After graduation, he created a school tour program, Stay Driven, to educate students on anti-bullying, anti-violence, peer pressure, leadership and working at peak performance. He has subsequently visited hundreds of schools to speak on those topics and in 2012 published a book Stay Driven: Can't Nobody Hold You Down on the same topics.

In 2007, D.O. released his debut album "The Northstarr" the album garnered a nomination from the Ontario Independent Music Awards. In 2009, D.O's sophomore album "Stay Driven" hit number 7 on the Canadian College Charts. In 2012, he released his third solo album "Heavy In The Game" which included the single "Can't Tell Me" featuring SonReal, Famous and Chris Jackson. The track peaked at Number 3 on the US College Hip Hop Charts in July 2012.

D.O. records as a solo artist and is also one-half of the duo Art of Fresh with beatmaker and vocalist Byram Joseph, a.k.a. Slakah the Beatchild. In 2009 their debut album "Back to the Earth" reached #2 on the National College Radio Charts. In 2010, the group's song "Out This World" hit number 1 on the US College Hip-Hop Radio Charts. Other musicians that he has collaborated with include DL Incognito, Red 1 of the Rascalz, Classified, Marco Polo, Metty the Dert Merchant (Sweatshop Union), JRDN, Maestro Fresh Wes and others. He videos rotate on MuchMusic, he has toured Canada multiple times and performed globally with stops in Tokyo, Hong Kong, London, New York City, Miami and Las Vegas.

== Guinness World Record ==
On July 5, 2003, D.O. set a Guinness World Record for the longest freestyle rap at the Dark Nights Nationals car show, an outdoor car festival in Toronto, Ontario, Canada. His rap lasted for 8 hours and 45 minutes and was performed in front of hundreds of spectators. He was the first rapper to have a video-documented evidence to support the claims to have done the world's longest be freestyle rap.

== Discography ==
=== Solo artist ===
- The Northstarr (2007)
- Stay Driven (2009)
- Heavy In The Game (2012)
- Down Home (2014)
- Duane Gibson (2015)
- On This Grind (2016)
- Seeds and Dominoes (2017)

=== With Art of Fresh ===
- Back to Earth (2008)
- When the night comes in (2010)

== Personal life ==
In 2026, he was named as an Member of the Order of Canada. He currently lives in Toronto, Ontario.
