= Nova Stevens =

Canadian model, actress, activist, and beauty queen

- Born: Nyawal Bukjok; May 5, 1992 (age 34); Nairobi, Kenya
- Occupations: Model; activist; beauty pageant titleholder
- Height: 1.83 m (6 ft 0 in)
- Beauty pageant titleholder
- Title: Miss Universe Canada 2020
- Hair colour: Black
- Eye colour: Brown
- Major competitions: Miss Universe Canada 2014 (Top 12); Miss Universe Canada 2018 (Top 20); Miss Universe Canada 2020 (Winner); Miss Universe 2020 (Unplaced)

Nova Stevens (née Nyawal Bukjok; born 5 May 1992) is a Canadian model, activist, and beauty pageant titleholder who was crowned Miss Universe Canada 2020. As Miss Universe Canada, she represented Canada at Miss Universe 2020, making her the first woman of South Sudanese origin to compete at the pageant. Stevens is also a professional model and an activist for Black Lives Matter.

== Early life ==
Stevens was born as Nyawal Bukjok in Kenya to South Sudanese parents fleeing the Second Sudanese Civil War. When she was six years old, the family sent her to Canada in order for her to have a better life; her parents and siblings later settled in Ethiopia. Stevens grew up with various relatives in Alberta and Ontario.

At age 15, Stevens left home and began living on her own. The following year, she moved to New York City and began working as a professional model, until moving to Vancouver in 2014, to continue her modelling career and venture into acting.

== Activism ==
Amidst the George Floyd protests, Stevens became a prominent activist for Black Lives Matter in Vancouver. Along with activist Shamika Mitchell, Stevens organized the Freedom March in June 2020, which saw over 15,000 people protesting against racism and police brutality while celebrating Juneteenth. Following the success of the march, Stevens and Mitchell organized other marches and events in support of Black Lives Matter within Vancouver. Stevens and Mitchell were instrumental in lobbying for Mayor Kennedy Stewart to declare August 1 as Emancipation Day in Vancouver.

Stevens is a spokesperson for the nonprofit organization Keep6ix, which provides assistance to underprivileged youth wrongly accused of criminal activity. She additionally has volunteered with Operation Smile and Feed it Forward.

== Pageantry ==
Stevens participated in Miss Universe Canada 2014 and Miss Universe Canada 2018.

In 2020, Stevens participated in the Miss Universe Canada 2020 competition, which she went on to win. She had initially decided to retire from pageantry, but was inspired to continue competing after Zozibini Tunzi was crowned Miss Universe 2019. Prior to competing in the pageant, Stevens had stated that she would use the platform to amplify her message of supporting Black Lives Matter and racial justice.

Following her win, she represented Canada at the Miss Universe 2020 competition, where she did not place in the Top 21.

Awards and achievements
Preceded by Alyssa Boston	Miss Universe Canada; 2020	Succeeded by Tamara Jemuovic
