= Miriam Mattova =

Slovak-Canadian model, beauty queen, and activist

- Born: 1992 (age 33–34); Bratislava, Slovakia
- Citizenship: Slovakia; Canada
- Occupations: Model, activist
- Awards: Miss Bikini Universe 2013

Miriam Mattová (born c. 1992) is a Slovak-Canadian model and activist. She took the Miss Bikini of the Universe 2013 title at a pageant in China. She was the second Slovak woman to win an international beauty pageant. In 2019 she reached the finals of Miss Universe Canada. She has modelled for regional editions of Harper's Bazaar, Marie Claire, Elle, Cosmopolitan, and L'Officiel. In December 2025 she received media coverage after alleging that an Uber driver in Toronto threw her out of a car for being Jewish.

== Early life ==
Mattová grew up in Bratislava. Her mother is Slovak and her father Canadian. Her grandmother survived the Theresienstadt concentration camp during the Holocaust. She and Mattová's great-grandmother were the only members of the family who came back.

She got a master's degree in business and marketing. She then started a doctoral programme in political science and was reportedly the youngest student in the programme. In April 2023 she moved to Toronto.

== Pageant and modelling career ==
Mattová started modelling at 17. She won Miss Bikini Universe 2013 at a competition in Taining County, China. In 2019 she was a finalist at Miss Universe Canada.

== Activism ==
After the October 7 attacks on Israel, Mattová started speaking publicly in support of Israel and against antisemitism. On November 17, 2025, after Toronto City Hall raised the Palestinian flag for the first time, Mattová stood across the square holding an Israeli flag.

=== Toronto Uber incident ===
On November 30, 2025, Mattová took an Uber in Toronto. She was on a FaceTime call talking about a trip to Israel. The driver pulled over at a busy intersection and told her to get out. According to Mattová, the driver said she did not drive Jewish people.

She filed a complaint through the Uber app. She said Uber did not respond until the National Post published the story on December 4. Uber told the newspaper the behaviour was "unacceptable".
