= Boost (drink) =

Nutritional drinks brand

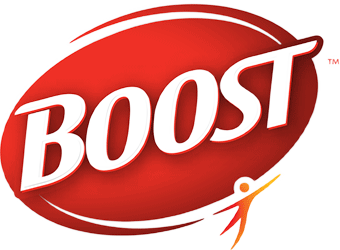
- Type: Nutritional drink
- Manufacturer: Nestlé
- Website: www.boost.com

Boost is a nutritional drinks brand made by Swiss company Nestlé. The brand also produces Boost Glucose Control for people with type 2 diabetes.

== History ==
In 2010, the Federal Trade Commission reached a settlement with Nestlé regarding its claims about Boost Kid Essentials, stating that the product would prevent certain illnesses. As part of the settlement, Nestlé agreed to cease making these claims unless they were approved by regulators. Nestle also agreed to refrain from asserting that the drink would reduce children's sick-day absences and the duration of acute diarrhea in children up to age 13 unless the claims are backed by at least two "well-designed human clinical studies." Nestlé said in a statement that the settlement provided clarity regarding new advertising standards applicable to health benefit claims for Boost Kid Essentials and similar products. Nestlé did not admit wrongdoing as part of the settlement, and the company was not fined.

In 2011, the packaging design and bottle shape of Boost products was changed. Due to increased demand in Boost, Nestlé added another line to its Indiana facility in 2013. In 2015, the brand introduced the Boost Compact range and in 2016 they introduced the Boost Simply range. The protein content of Boost was increased by 33% in 2018, from 15 grams per serving to 20 grams.
