= The Amazing Race Canada 9 =

Season of television series

- Season 9
- Presented by: Jon Montgomery
- No. of teams: 10
- Winners: Ty Smith & Kat Kastner
- No. of legs: 10
- Distance traveled: 12,000 km (7,500 mi)
- No. of episodes: 11

Release
- Original network: CTV
- Original release: July 4 – September 19, 2023

Additional information
- Filming dates: April 21 – May 14, 2023

Series chronology
- ← Previous; Season 8 Next → Season 10

The Amazing Race Canada 9 is the ninth season of The Amazing Race Canada, a Canadian reality competition show based on the American series The Amazing Race. Hosted by Jon Montgomery, it featured ten teams of two, each with a pre-existing relationship, in a race across Canada. The grand prize included a CA$250,000 cash payout powered by Samsung, a trip for two around the world, and two Chevrolet Colorado ZR2s. This season visited six provinces and travelled over 12,000 kilometres (7,500 mi) during ten legs. Starting in Winnipeg, racers travelled through Manitoba, Alberta, British Columbia, Ontario, Quebec, and Nova Scotia before finishing in Halifax. New elements introduced in this season include the Assist, which allowed teams to only perform part of select tasks, and the Blind Double Pass, which allowed teams to use the Pass anonymously. The season premiered on CTV on July 4, 2023, and concluded on September 19, 2023.

Dating couple Ty Smith and Kat Kastner were the winners of this season, while dating couple Tyler Turner and Kayleen Vanderee finished in second place, and friends Ben Chutta and Anwar Ahmed finished in third place.

== Production ==
=== Development and filming ===
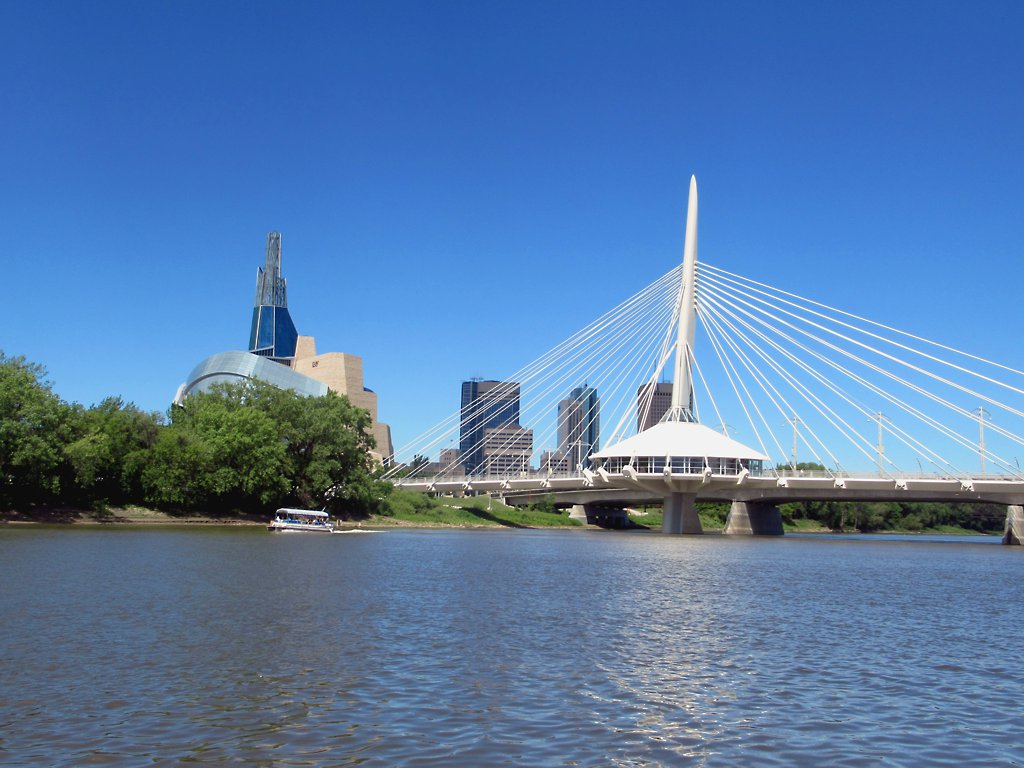
Teams gathered at the Esplanade Riel in Winnipeg to begin The Amazing Race Canada 9.

On November 28, 2022, CTV announced the renewal of the show for a ninth season. Filming for the season was listed as occurring during Spring 2023. Following the 11th Canadian Screen Awards on April 12, 2023, producer Mark Lysakowski announced that filming would begin during the next week.

Filming began in late April in Winnipeg. On April 24, 2023, the second leg was filmed in Smithers, British Columbia. Racers were in Greater Victoria on April 29. On May 5, the show was spotted in Niagara-on-the-Lake. The show was in Toronto on May 12 with Jon Montgomery and the production crew opening the Toronto Stock Exchange. Later in the day, racers were spotted at Kensington Market. On May 14, 2023, the final leg was filmed in Eastern Passage, Nova Scotia.

This season introduced a new twist called the Assist. Given to each team at the start of the season, teams could use the Assist in select challenges through the sixth leg and only have to perform part of the challenge.

=== Casting ===
Casting for the ninth season opened on November 28, 2022. Casting was initially set to close on January 6, 2023, but was extended to January 8, 2023.

=== Marketing ===
Chevrolet, Desjardins Group, Expedia, Disney Studios (promoting Haunted Mansion), and GURU Organic Energy returned as sponsors. New sponsors included Samsung, Staples Canada, and the Canadian Armed Forces.

== Cast ==
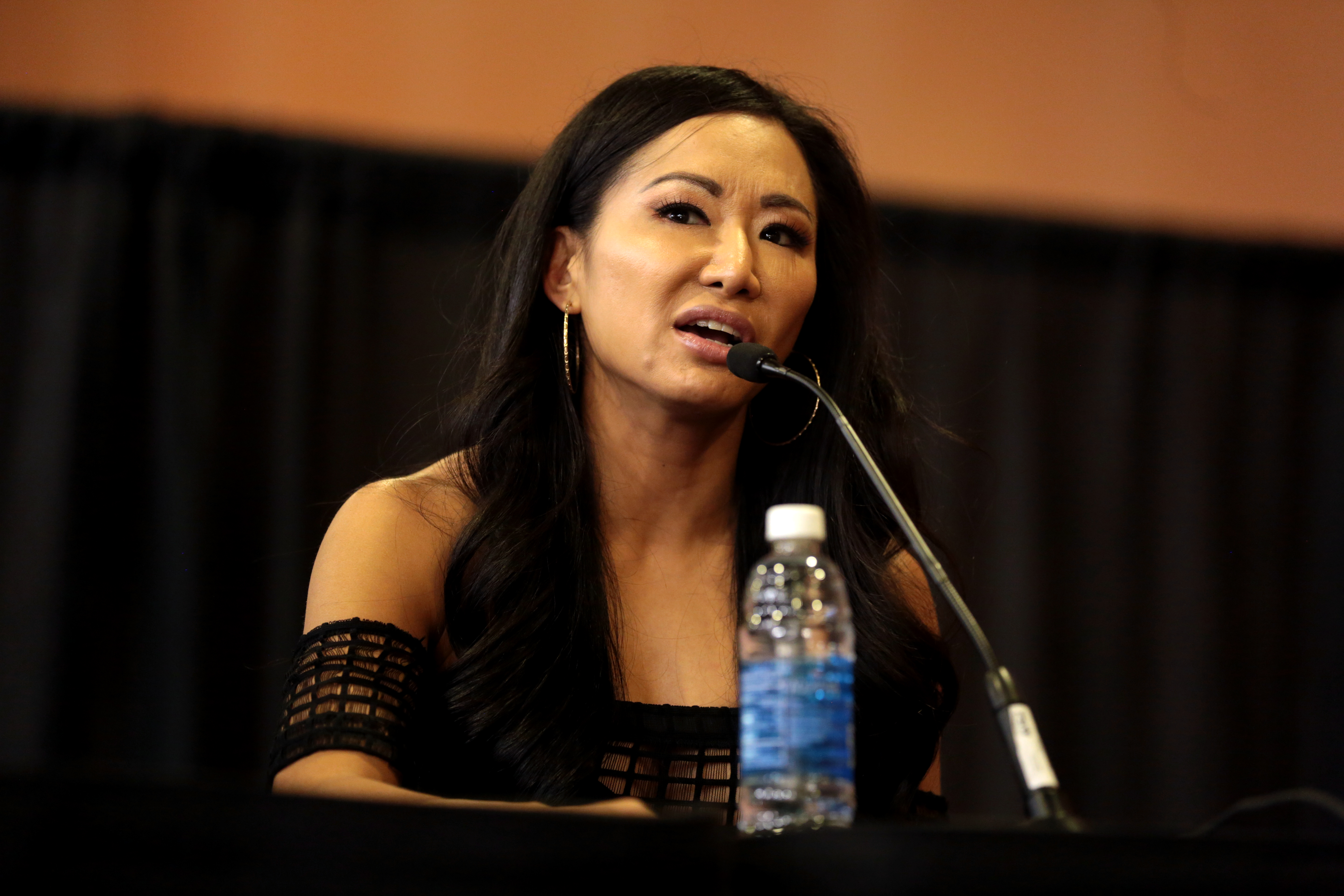
Gail Kim

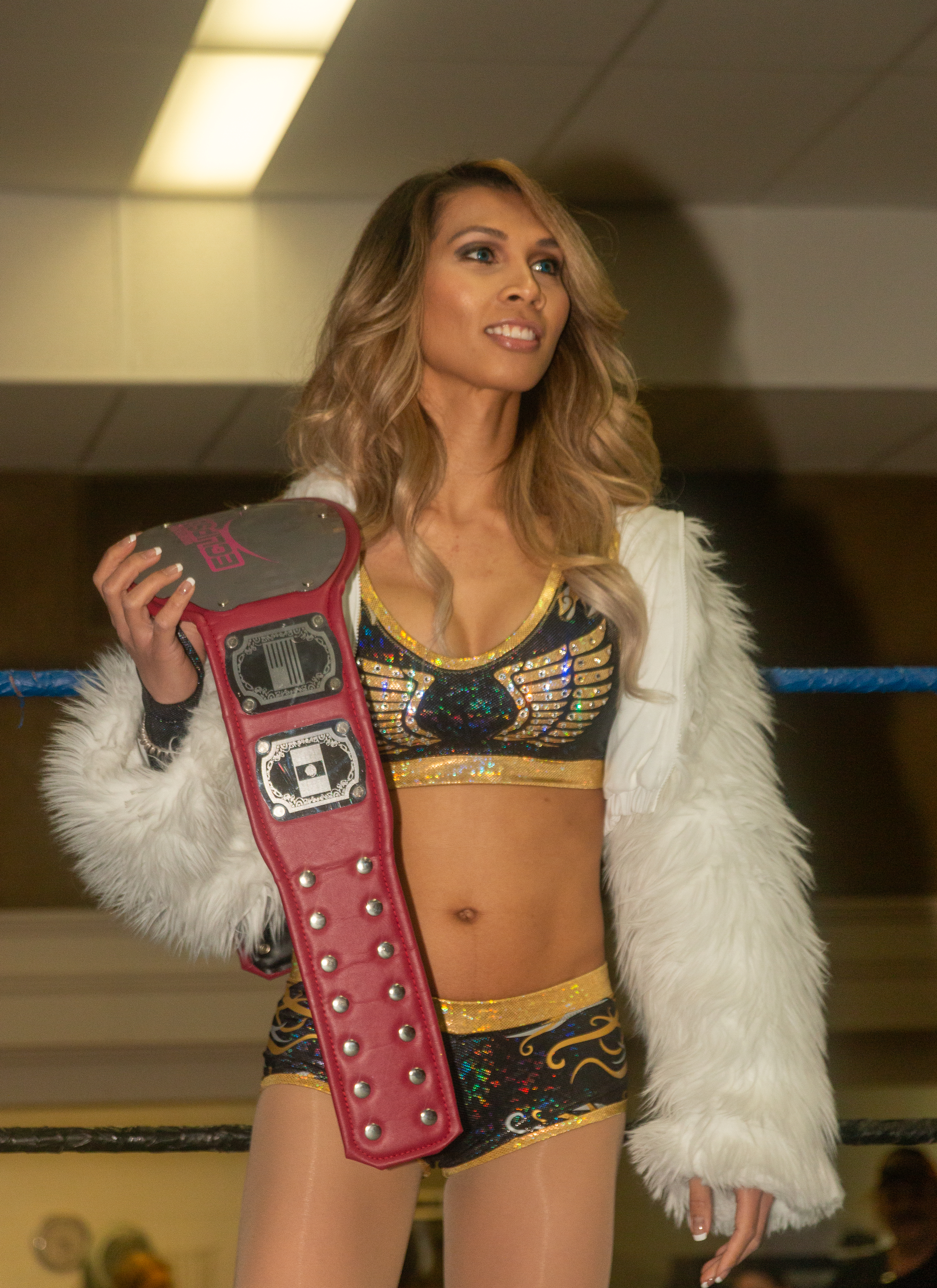
Gisele Shaw

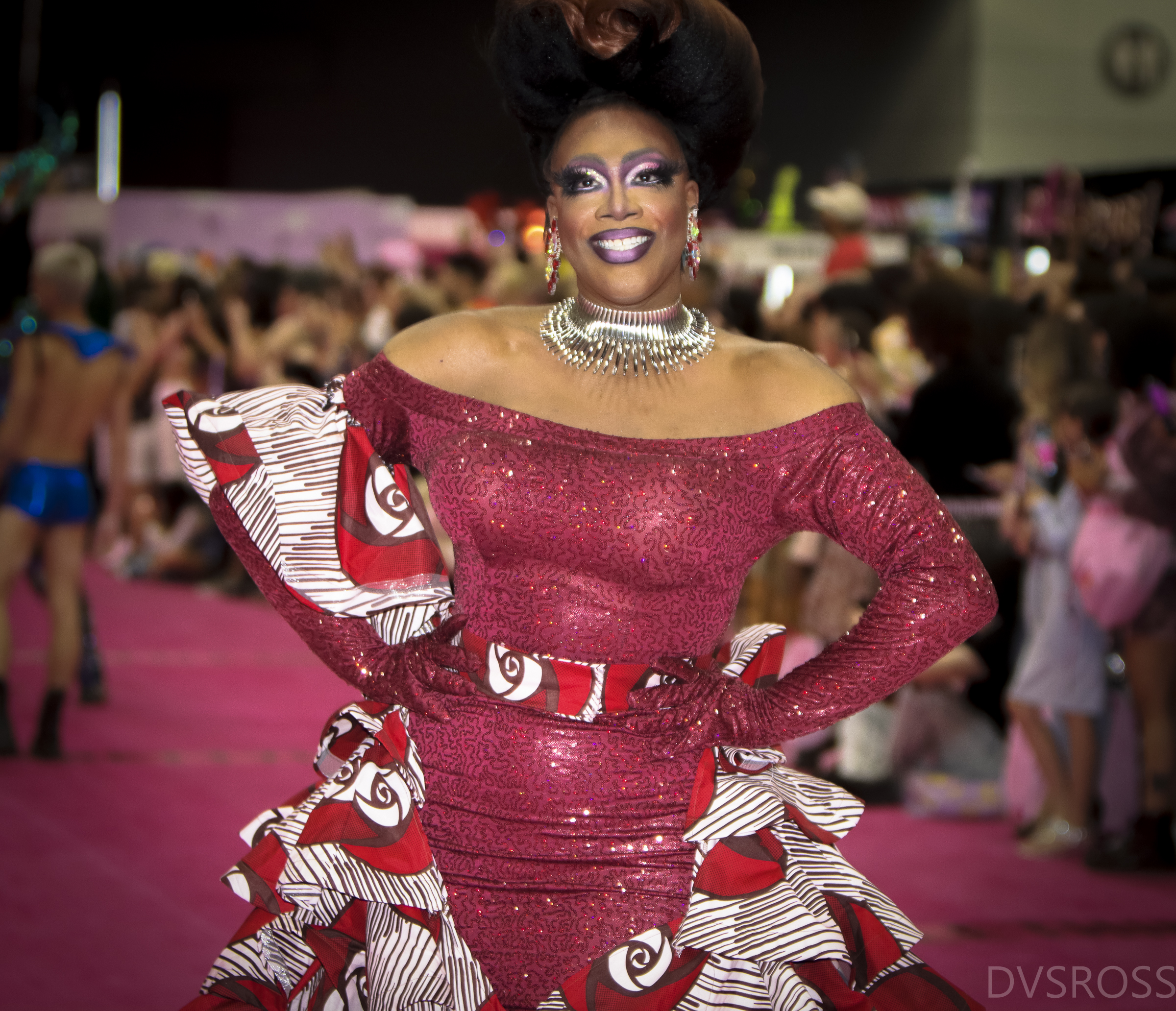
Kimora Amour

The cast includes Impact wrestlers Gail Kim and Gisele Shaw, Canada's Drag Race contestants Jermaine Aranha and Justin Baird, actor Joel Oulette, Paralympic snowboarder Tyler Turner, and Ty Smith, a survivor of the 2018 Humboldt Broncos bus crash. The cast was revealed on June 21, 2023.

Contestants	Age	Relationship	Hometown	Status
Gail Kim	46	Friends & Co-Workers	Toronto, Ontario	Eliminated 1st (in Calgary, Alberta)
Gisele Shaw	34	Friends & Co-Workers	Yellowknife, Northwest Territories	Eliminated 1st (in Calgary, Alberta)
Allie Seller	48	Married	Courtenay, British Columbia	Eliminated 2nd (in Smithers, British Columbia)
Eddie Parinas	52	Married	Richmond, British Columbia	Eliminated 2nd (in Smithers, British Columbia)
Shayla Stonechild	29	Siblings	Medicine Hat, Alberta	Eliminated 3rd (in Sooke, British Columbia)
Joel Oulette	21	Siblings	Medicine Hat, Alberta	Eliminated 3rd (in Sooke, British Columbia)
Gracie Lowes	25	Friends	Toronto, Ontario	Eliminated 4th (in Pacific Rim National Park Reserve, British Columbia)
Lily Bateman	24	Friends	Canning, Nova Scotia	Eliminated 4th (in Pacific Rim National Park Reserve, British Columbia)
Derek Gottenbos	28	Friends	Richmond, British Columbia	Eliminated 5th (in Point Pelee National Park, Ontario)
Jaspal Sidhu	28	Friends	Richmond, British Columbia	Eliminated 5th (in Point Pelee National Park, Ontario)
Jermaine Aranha	41	Friends	Toronto, Ontario	Eliminated 6th (in Saguenay, Quebec)
Justin Baird	36	Friends	Toronto, Ontario	Eliminated 6th (in Saguenay, Quebec)
Deven Condo-Mitchell	33	Couple	Gesgapegiag, Quebec	Eliminated 7th (in Toronto, Ontario)
Amanda Larocque	41	Couple	Gesgapegiag, Quebec	Eliminated 7th (in Toronto, Ontario)
Ben Chutta	31	Friends	Winnipeg, Manitoba	Third place
Anwar Ahmed	32	Friends	Winnipeg, Manitoba	Third place
Tyler Turner	35	Dating	Calgary, Alberta	Runners-up
Kayleen Vanderee	31	Dating	Comox Valley, British Columbia	Runners-up
Ty Smith	25	Dating	Hinton, Alberta	Winners
Kat Kastner	25	Dating	Calgary, Alberta	Winners

Future appearances

In 2024, Gail Kim competed on the second season of The Traitors Canada.

== Results ==
The following teams are listed with their placements in each leg. Placements are listed in finishing order.

- A red placement with a dagger (†) indicates that the team was eliminated.
- An underlined blue placement with a double-dagger (‡) indicates that the team was the last to arrive at a Pit Stop in a non-elimination leg, and had to perform a Speed Bump task in the following leg.
- An italicized and underlined placement indicates that the team was the last to arrive, but there was no rest period at the Pit Stop and all teams were instructed to continue racing. There was no required Speed Bump task in the next leg.
- A green α indicates that the team used the Assist during the leg.
- A teal х indicates that the leg featured a Face Off challenge.
- A purple ε indicates that the team used an Express Pass on that leg to bypass one of their tasks.
- A brown ∈ indicates that the team used the Pass and a brown ∋ indicates the team on the receiving end of the Pass.

Team placement (by leg)
Team	1	2	3	4x (Note: This leg featured a Face Off challenge.)	5	6	7x	8	9x	10
Ty & Kat	1st	1st	2nd	4th	2nd∋ (Note: Derek & Jaspal chose to use the Pass on Ty & Kat.)	1stε (Note: This team used their Express Pass to bypass one of the tasks on this leg.)α (Note: This team used the Assist on this leg.)	1st	2nd	3rd	1st
Tyler & Kayleen	5th	2nd	4th	3rd	1stα	3rdε	2nd	1st	1st	2nd
Ben & Anwar	8th	5th	7th	6th	5th∈ (Note: Ben & Anwar chose to use the Pass on Gracie & Lily.)	2ndεα	3rd	3rd	2nd	3rd
Deven & Amanda	6th	8th	6th	7th	4th	4thα	4th (Note: Deven & Amanda and Jermaine & Justin tied for 4th place after both teams stepped on the Pit Stop mat at the same time.)	4th	4th†	
Jermaine & Justin	4th	6th	8th‡ (Note: Jermaine & Justin initially arrived 5th, but were issued a 6-hour penalty after failing to complete the Roadblock and the wedding table challenge. Three teams checked in during this penalty time, dropping Jermaine & Justin to 8th.)α	5th	6th	6th (Note: This team arrived last at the Pit Stop, but they were instructed to continue racing.)	4th	5th†		
Derek & Jaspal	3rd	3rd	3rd	1st	3rd∈	5thα	6th†			
Gracie & Lily	2nd	4th	1st	2nd	7th†∋α					
Shayla & Joel	7th	7th	5th	8th†						
Allie & Eddie	9th	9th†								
Gail & Gisele	10th†									

== Race summary ==
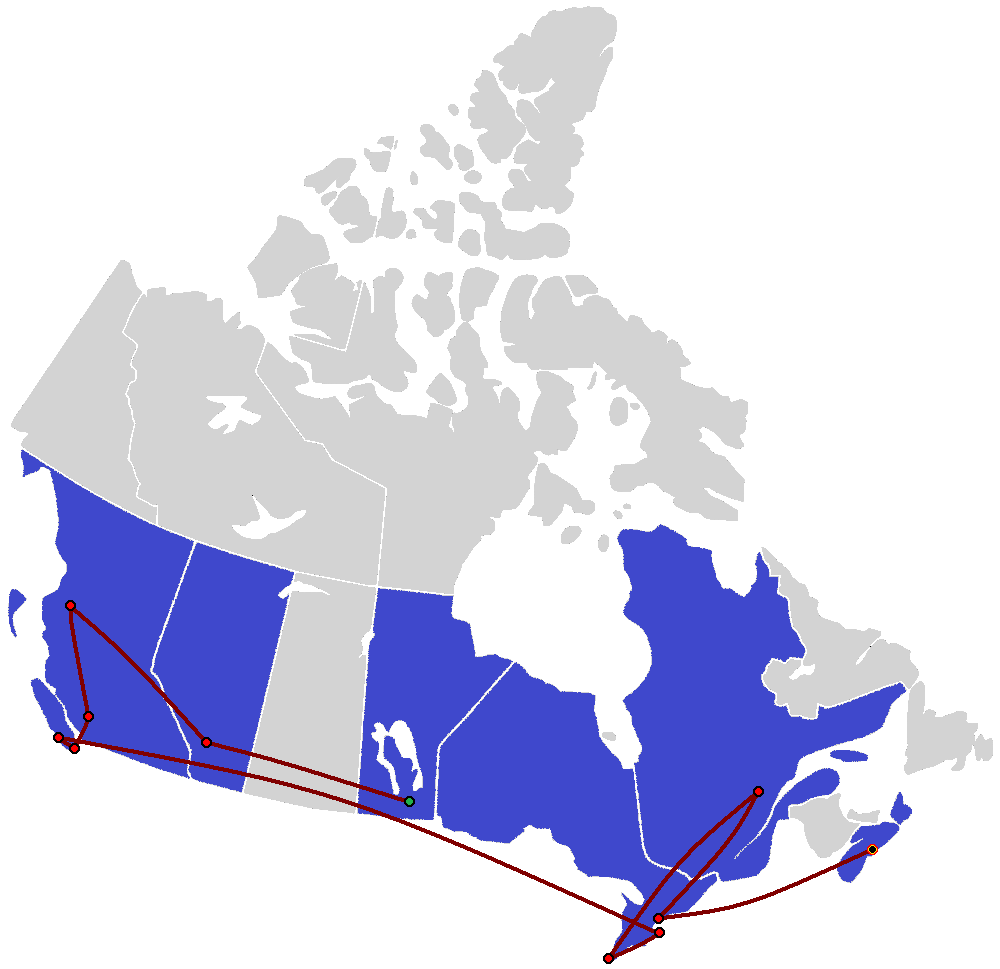
The route map of The Amazing Race Canada 9.

Destinations	Air travel Rail travel Water travel Bus travel Helicopter travel Bicycle travel Gondola travel
Route Markers	Detour Roadblock Face Off Speed Bump; Pass Express Pass Assist Pit Stop

=== Leg 1 (Manitoba → Alberta) ===
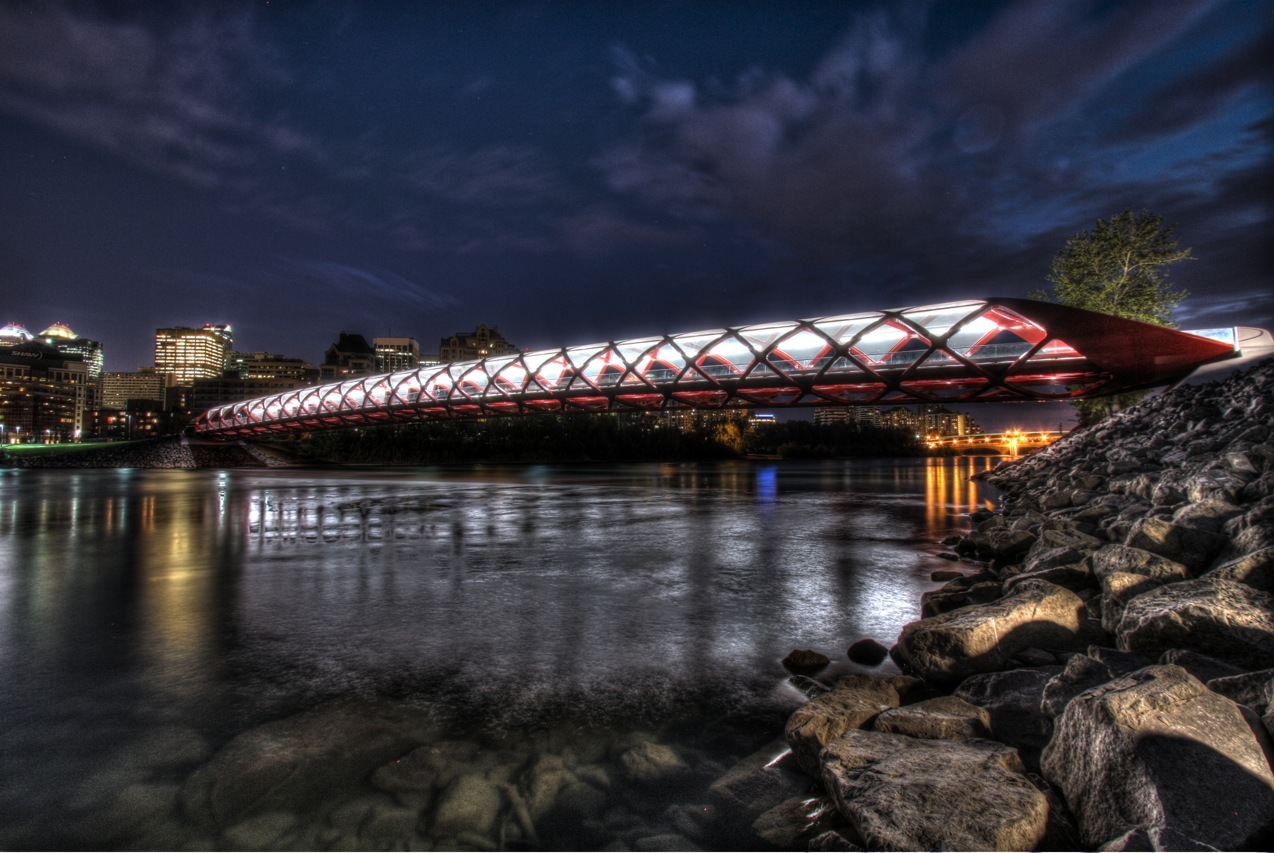
The first leg of The Amazing Race Canada 9 concluded in Calgary at the Peace Bridge.

- Episode 1: "I Hate Pancakes" (July 4, 2023)
- Prize: A trip for two to Berlin, Germany (awarded to Ty & Kat)
- Eliminated: Gail & Gisele

Locations

- Winnipeg, Manitoba (Esplanade Riel) (Starting Line)
- Winnipeg (Winnipeg Art Gallery – Qaumajuq Visible Vault)
- Winnipeg (Winnipeg James Armstrong Richardson International Airport) → Calgary, Alberta (Calgary International Airport)
- Calgary (Calgary Central Library)
- Calgary (The Devenish Building – Betty Lou's Library)
- Calgary (Stephen Avenue or Olympic Plaza)
- Calgary (Peace Bridge)

Episode summary

- After running across the Esplanade Riel to their first clue, teams had to travel to the Qaumajuq Visible Vault at the Winnipeg Art Gallery. There, teams had to choose an artwork title and search among 5,000 pieces of Inuit art for their chosen sculpture. They then had to enter the locator number into the museum database to find the name of their sculpture's artist in order to receive their next clue.
- At the Fast Air Jet Centre of Winnipeg's airport, teams had to sign up for one of two flights, each carrying five teams, to Calgary, Alberta. Once there, teams had to search outside of the airport for their next clue.
- In this season's first Roadblock, one team member had to rappel face-first down the exterior of the Calgary Central Library and look for three yellow flags attached to the building with the name of their next destination – Betty Lou's Library – in order to receive their next clue. Teams also had the option of searching a section of the library for a book marked with an Amazing Race flag containing three Express Passes. Ty & Kat found the Express Passes.
- After the Roadblock, teams had to say a secret code to enter Betty Lou's Library, a 1920s-themed speakeasy, and use the Nightography feature of a smartphone to photograph their next clue.
- This season's first Detour was a choice between Batter or Beat. In Batter, one team member had to memorize six Calgary Stampede pancake orders, and the other team member had to make the pancakes. After the order was taken, the guests switched tables and seats, and teams had to serve the correct people and pancakes in order to receive their next clue. In Beat, teams were taught a call and response drumming technique. Teams then joined a drum circle, and team members had to perform the beat sequence in sync with each other in order to receive their next clue.
- After the Detour, teams had to check in at the Pit Stop: the Peace Bridge.

=== Leg 2 (Alberta → British Columbia) ===
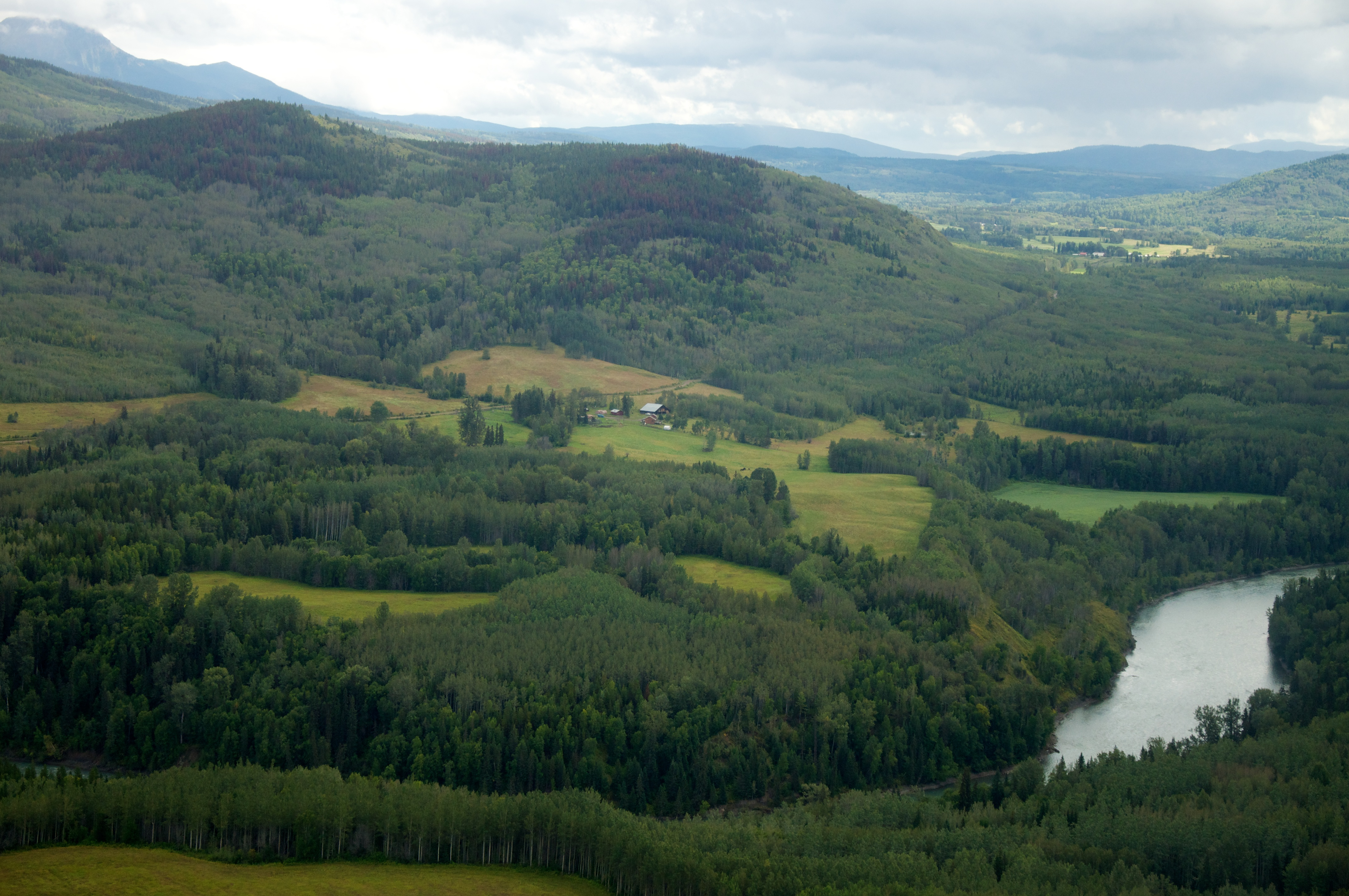
After landing in Smithers, British Columbia, teams had to grab artificial fish from the Bulkley River.

- Episode 2: "My First Experience" (July 11, 2023)
- Prize: A trip for two to Lisbon, Portugal (awarded to Ty & Kat)
- Eliminated: Allie & Eddie

Locations

- Calgary (Stephen Avenue)
- Calgary (Calgary International Airport) → Smithers, British Columbia (Smithers Airport)
- Smithers (Frontier Experience Lodge – Bulkley River)
- Smithers (Bulkley Valley Museum)
- Smithers (Coast Mountain GM)
- Smithers (The Sausage Factory & Smithers Brewing Co. or Nature's Pantry & Two Sisters Cafe)
- Smithers (Jollymore Ranch)

Episode summary

- At the start of this leg, teams were instructed to fly to Smithers, British Columbia. Teams first had to sign up for one of two flights, carrying four and five teams respectively, at Calgary International Airport. After landing, teams had to search for a marked truck at the airport, which contained their next clue, instructing them to drive to the Frontier Experience Lodge. There, teams had to retrieve ten different species of artificial fish in order to receive their next clue.
- Teams had to listen to CICK-FM to learn that they had to drive to the Bulkley Valley Museum, where they found their next clue. Team members had to write the answers to five questions specific to each team by Jon Montgomery on a smartphone. If teams matched three answers, then Jon gave them their next clue.
- In this leg's Roadblock, one team member had to memorize 20 features of a second generation Chevrolet Trax and then perform a vehicle introduction to a buyer in order to receive their next clue.
- This leg's Detour was a choice between Stuff or Fold. In Stuff, teams had to use a hand-operated sausage maker to make 12 sausages links. Then, they had to travel by horse-drawn carriage to Smithers Brewing Co. and deliver the sausages in order to receive their next clue. In Fold, teams had to fold an egg carton based on the design from inventor and Smithers native Joseph Coyle. Then, they had to travel by horse-drawn carriage to Two Sisters Cafe and deliver their eggs intact in order to receive their next clue.
- After the Detour, teams had to check in at the Pit Stop: the Jollymore Ranch.

=== Leg 3 (British Columbia) ===
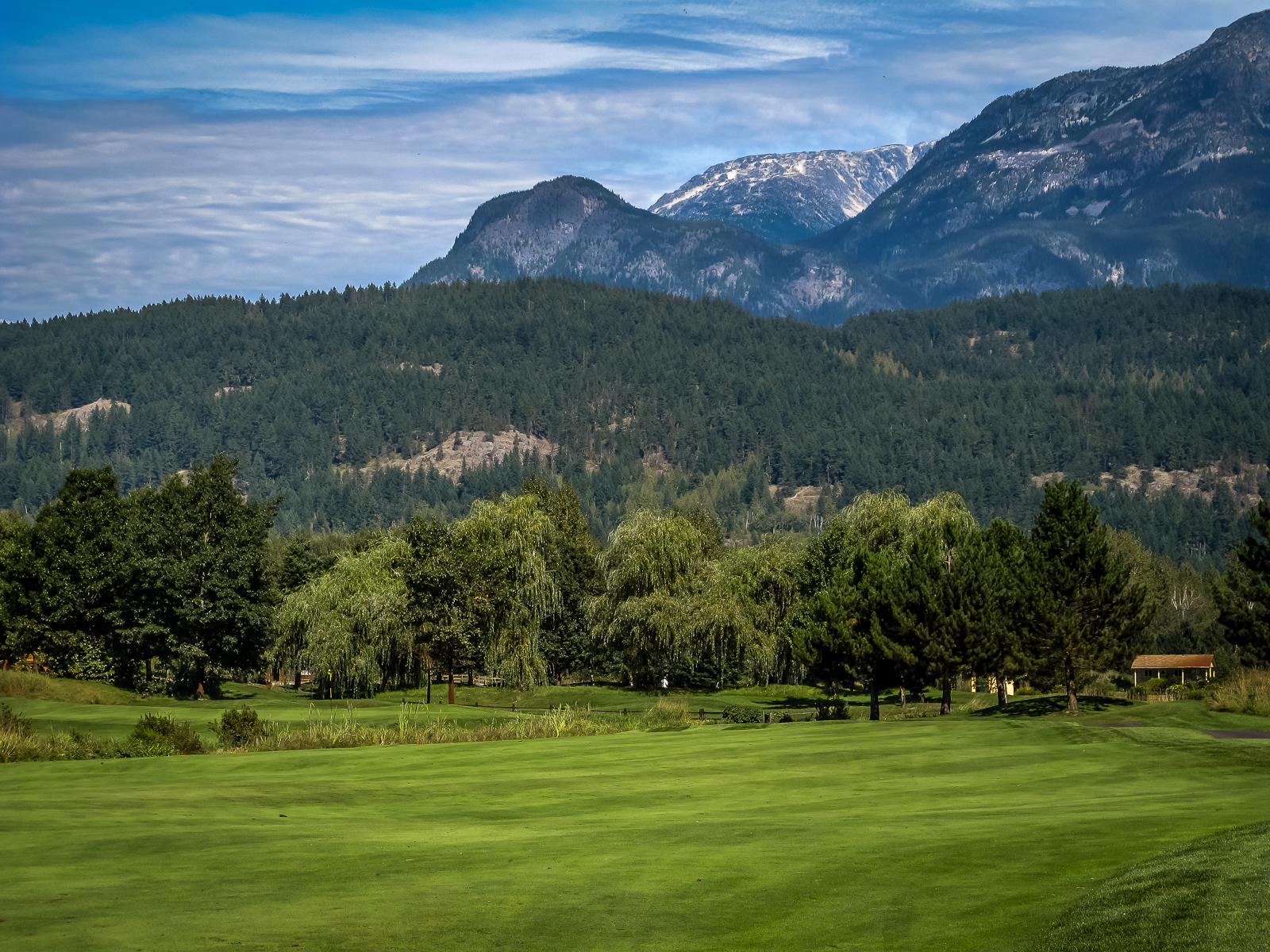
Teams finished the third leg at the Big Sky Golf Club in Pemberton, British Columbia.

- Episode 3: "Bribery Always Works" (July 18, 2023)
- Prize: A trip for two to Oslo, Norway (awarded to Gracie & Lily)

Locations

- Smithers (Riverside Municipal Campground)
- Smithers → Vancouver
- Vancouver (Queen Elizabeth Park) → Whistler (Inuksuk)
- Whistler (Squamish Lil'Wat Cultural Centre or Scandinave Spa)
- Whistler (Whistler Bungee)
- Pemberton (Riverlands Equestrian Facility)
- Pemberton (Big Sky Golf Club)

Episode summary

- At the start of this leg, teams were instructed to fly to Vancouver. Once there, teams had to travel to Queen Elizabeth Park and sign up for one of two buses, each carrying four teams, to Whistler. In Whistler, teams found their next clue by the village's inuksuk.
- This leg's Detour was a choice between Woods or Water. In Woods, teams had to travel to the Squamish Lil'Wat Cultural Centre and memorize ten plaques with words in Squamish and Lil'Wat. Teams then had to place the correct Squamish and Lil'Wat translations beneath the English words on a board in order to receive their next clue. In Water, teams had to travel to Scandinave Spa and choose a coloured tile with partial lettering. They then had to memorize two additional tiles in a cold pool and a hot pool and combine the three tiles to form a spa-related word in order to receive their next clue.
- In this leg's Roadblock, one team member had to perform a 160-foot (49 m) bungee jump and record a phrase – "Will you marry me?" – with a smartphone in order to receive their next clue.
- After the Roadblock, teams found their next clue at the Riverlands Equestrian Facility. There, one team member had to memorize a 130-piece wedding table setting and then direct their partner to recreate the table setting in order to receive their next clue.
- After driving to Big Sky Golf Club, teams had to search through more than 600 golf balls for two with their team names. After finding the balls, teams could check in at the Pit Stop at the 17th hole. If teams used the Assist, then they only had to find one ball. Jermaine & Justin used their Assist.

Additional note

- This was a non-elimination leg.

=== Leg 4 (British Columbia) ===
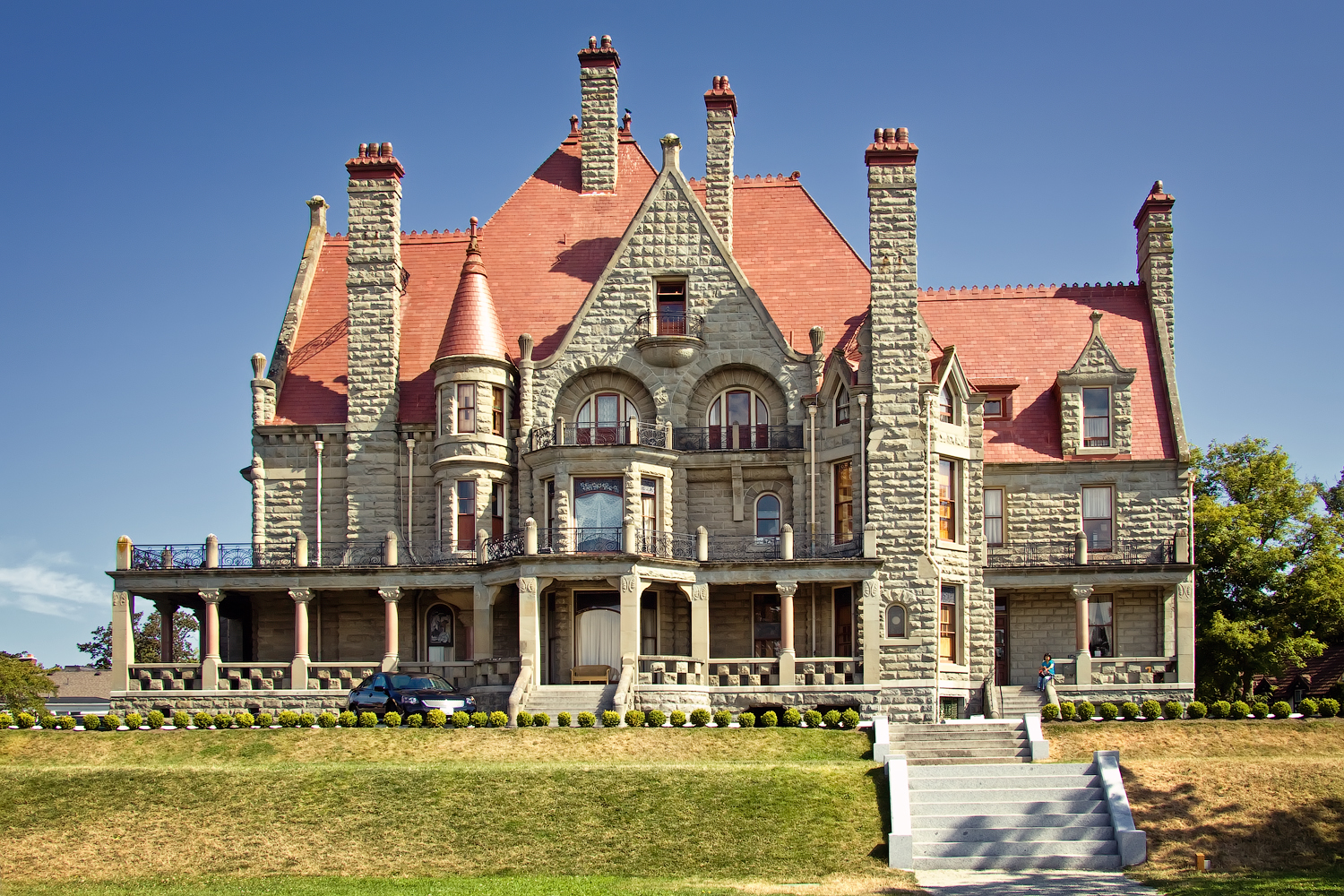
Teams encountered a haunted mansion at Craigdarroch Castle in Victoria, British Columbia.

- Episode 4: "This Ugly Duckling is Now a Swan" (July 25, 2023)
- Prize: A trip for two to Nassau, Bahamas (awarded to Derek & Jaspal)
- Eliminated: Shayla & Joel

Locations

- Whistler (Rebagliati Park)
- West Vancouver → Nanaimo
- Malahat (Malahat SkyWalk)
- Victoria (Craigdarroch Castle)
- Victoria (Victoria Bug Zoo)
- Esquimalt (Colville Park Sports Field)
- Sooke (Sooke Harbour)
- Sooke (Whiffin Spit)

Episode summary

- At the start of this leg, teams were instructed to drive to the Cowichan Valley, with an intermediate ferry ride, and find their next clue at the Malahat SkyWalk. There, teams had to book an overnight hotel and tickets to the skywalk for the next morning using a mobile app. Teams then had to use a smartphone to photograph ten driftwood sculptures in order to receive their next clue.
- Teams had to drive to Craigdarroch Castle in Victoria, British Columbia, and search for ten replica props from Haunted Mansion. Teams then had to pinpoint the props on a floor plan in order to receive their next clue.
- For their Speed Bump, Jermaine & Justin had to drive to the Victoria Bug Zoo and eat a pint of ice cream while tarantulas crawled on their arms before they could continue racing.
- For this season's first Face Off, two teams had to compete against each other and assemble a bell tent with assistance from the Canadian-Scottish regiment at Colville Park Sports Field. The first team to finish received their next clue, while the losing team had to wait for another team. The last team remaining at the Face Off had to wait out a time penalty before moving on.
- After the Face Off, teams had to drive to Sooke Harbour, where one team member had to use a standup paddleboard to retrieve three luggage tags associated with a specific vacation while their partner directed them in order to receive their next clue directing them to the Pit Stop: Whiffin Spit in Sooke.

=== Leg 5 (British Columbia) ===
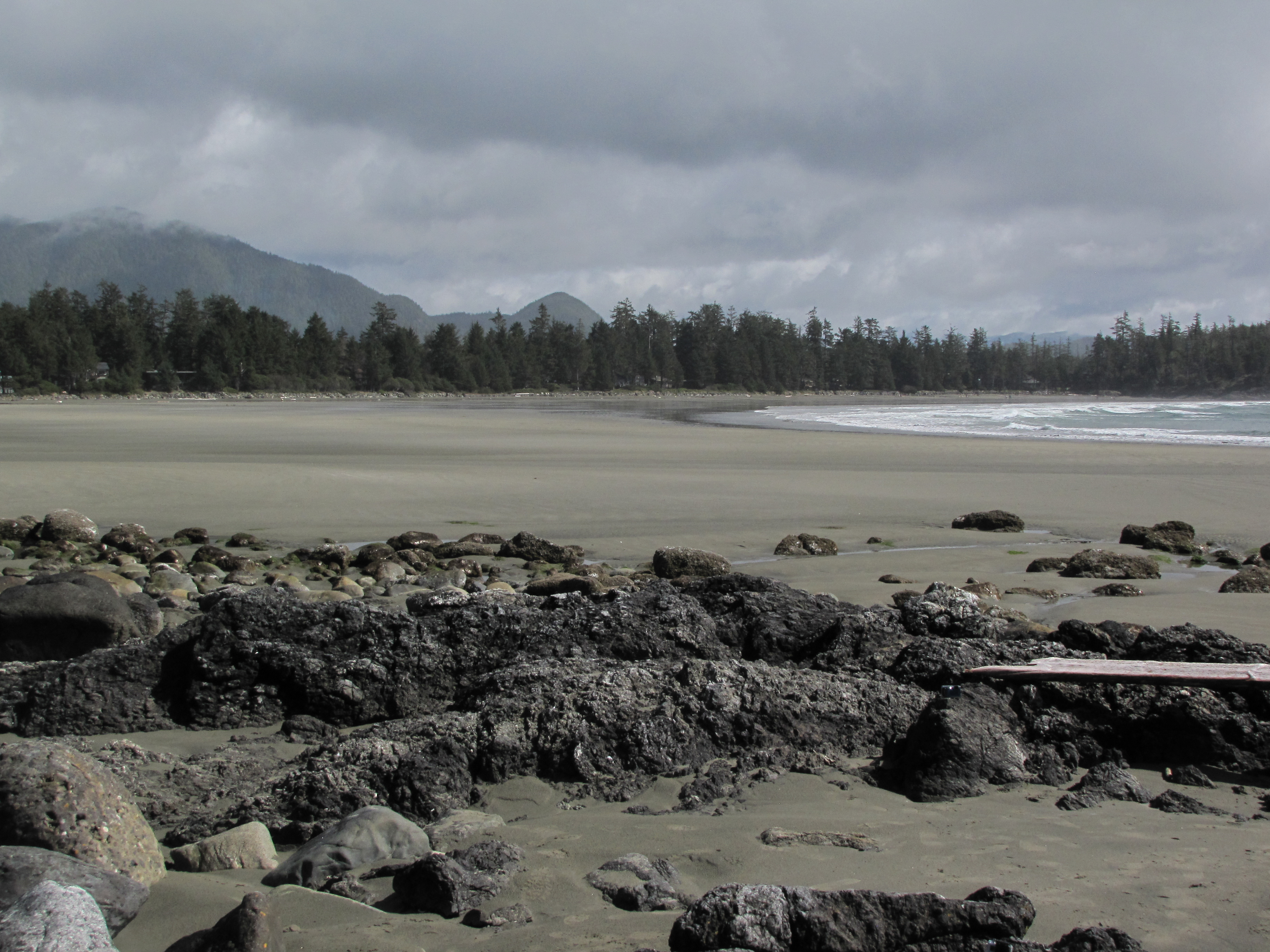
One Detour option in Tofino had teams searching sandcastles at South Chesterman Beach for a sand dollar.

- Episode 5: "This is Not a Hot Girl Moment" (August 1, 2023)
- Prize: A trip for two to New Orleans, Louisiana (awarded to Tyler & Kayleen)
- Eliminated: Gracie & Lily

Locations

- Langford (Langford Fountain)
- Victoria → Ucluelet (Ucluelet Harbour)
- Tofino (Hotel Zed)
- Ucluelet (Ukee Ice Manufacturing Company)
- Ucluelet (Little Beach)
- Tofino (Tacofino)
- Tofino (South Chesterman Beach or Naas Foods & Clayoquot Sound)
- Tofino (North Chesterman Beach)
- Pacific Rim National Park Reserve (Long Beach)

Episode summary

- At the start of this leg, teams were instructed to sign up for one of two buses to Ucluelet. At the town's harbour, teams found their next clue instructing them to drive to the Hotel Zed, where they received a Tarot card reading before receiving their next clue.
- Teams had to drive to Ukee Ice Manufacturing Company, where they had to load between 75 and 80 pounds of ice. Teams then had to deliver the ice to one of four locations and return to the ice company in order to receive their next clue frozen in an ice block.
- Teams had to drive to Little Beach, where one team member had to don a wetsuit and dive into the Pacific Ocean to retrieve three ingredients for an energy drink in order to receive their next clue. Teams then had to drive to Tacofino in order to find their next clue.
- This leg's Detour was a choice between By Sand or By Sea. In By Sand, teams had to drive to South Chesterman Beach and search more than 300 sandcastles for a marked sand dollar in order to receive their next clue. If a sandcastle didn't have a sand dollar, teams had to rebuild it before they could search another. In By Sea, teams had to drive to Naas Foods and take a boat to Clayoquot Sound, where they had to harvest 20 kilograms of kelp in order to receive their next clue.
- In this leg's Roadblock, one team member had to perform an aerial dance consisting of nine poses while hanging from Sitka spruce trees in order to receive their next clue. If racers used the Assist, then they only had to perform the final five poses. Tyler & Kayleen and Gracie & Lily used their Assist.
- After the Roadblock, teams had to check in at the Pit Stop: Long Beach in the Pacific Rim National Park Reserve.

Additional notes

- Teams received a message on a smartwatch to take part in a bonfire on MacKenzie Beach while they waited for the Hotel Zed to open.
- At the Blind Double Pass, Derek & Jaspal used the Pass on Ty & Kat, and Ben & Anwar used the Pass on Gracie & Lily.

=== Leg 6 (British Columbia → Ontario) ===
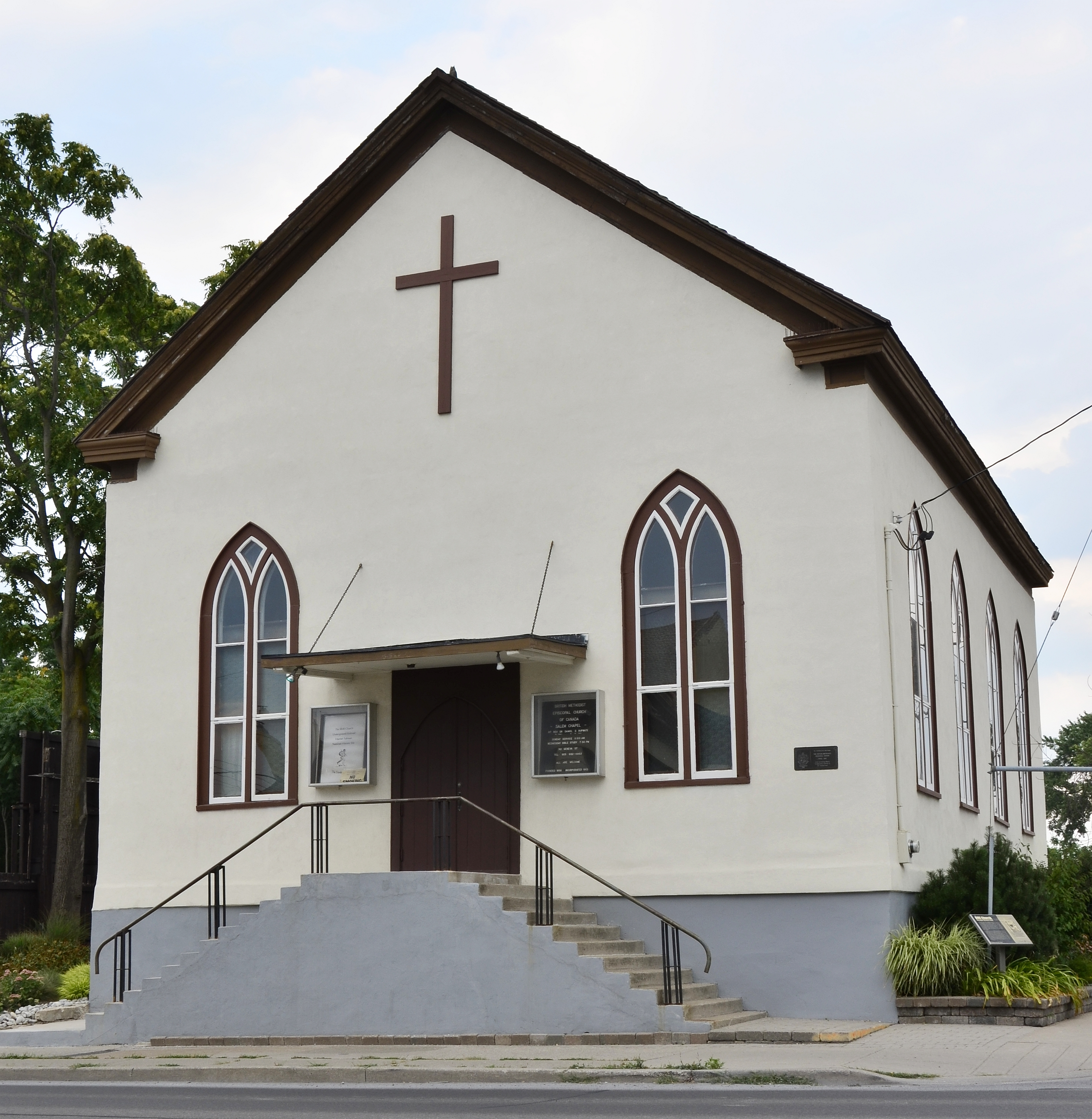
After driving to the Niagara region, teams visited the Salem Chapel and learned about Harriet Tubman.

- Episode 6: "This is Going to be a Spicy Leg" (August 15, 2023)
- Prize: A trip for two to Athens, Greece (awarded to Ty & Kat)

Locations

- Sidney (Eastview Park)
- Victoria → Toronto, Ontario (Toronto Pearson International Airport)
- St. Catharines (Salem Chapel)
- St. Catharines (St. Catharines Propulsion Plant)
- Pelham (United Floral Distributors) or Welland (Welland International Flatwater Centre)
- Niagara-on-the-Lake (Château des Charmes)
- Niagara-on-the-Lake (124 on Queen Hotel and Spa)
- Niagara-on-the-Lake (Fort Mississauga)

Episode summary

- At the start of this leg, teams were instructed to fly to Toronto, Ontario. Once there, teams found their next clue on a marked car instructing them to drive themselves to Salem Chapel, where they learned about the history of church member Harriet Tubman before receiving their next clue.
- In this leg's first Roadblock, one team member had to assemble and disassemble a V8 engine head within two minutes and ten seconds in order to receive their next clue. Ben & Anwar and Tyler & Kayleen used their Express Passes to bypass this Roadblock.
- This leg's Detour was a Blind Detour, where teams only learned about the task once they reached its location, and was a choice between Here or There. In Here, teams had to recreate three flower bouquets and record a 360° video of the bouquets on a smartphone in order to receive their next clue. In There, teams had to row a double scull along a 200-metre (660 ft) course on the Welland Canal within two minutes in order to receive their next clue. Ty & Kat used their Express Pass to bypass this Detour.
- In this leg's second Roadblock, the team member who did not perform the previous Roadblock had to fill a grape harvester with water, drive the harvester across the winery, and fill two troughs with water. If racers used the Assist, then they only had to fill one trough. Ben & Anwar, Derek & Jaspal, Devin & Amanda, and Ty & Kat used their Assist.
- After driving to 124 on Queen Hotel and Spa, teams had to smell and match six wines to their flavours in order to receive their next clue directing them to the Pit Stop: Fort Mississauga in Niagara-on-the-Lake.

Additional note

- There was no elimination at the end of this leg; all teams were instead instructed to continue racing.

=== Leg 7 (Ontario) ===
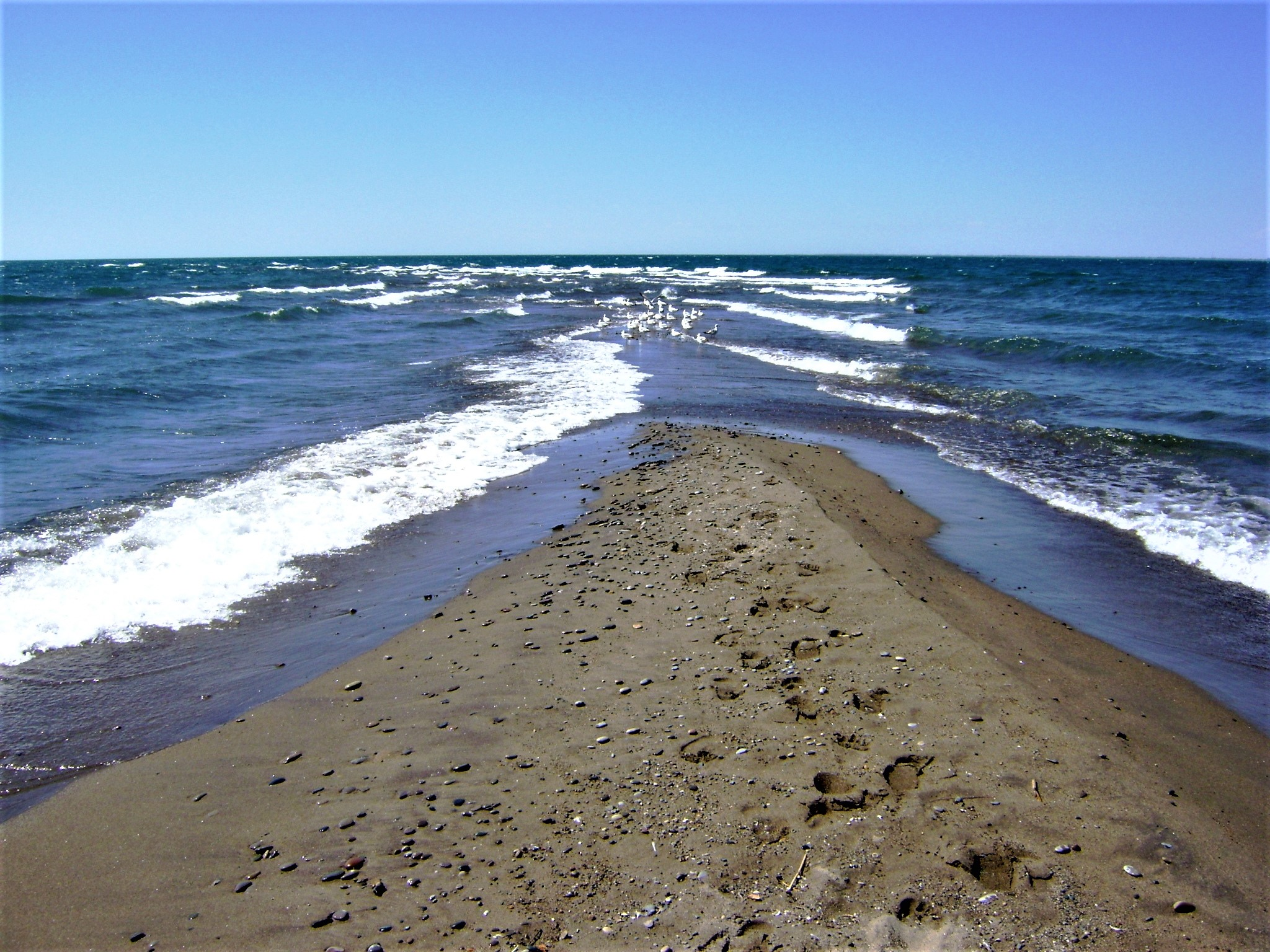
Teams finished the seventh leg in Windsor, Ontario at Point Pelee National Park, the southernmost point in mainland Canada.

- Episode 7: "I'm Sick of Wearing Neon" (August 22, 2023)
- Prize: A trip for two to Rio de Janeiro, Brazil (awarded to Ty & Kat)
- Eliminated: Derek & Jaspal

Locations

- Niagara-on-the-Lake → Toronto
- Toronto → Windsor (Windsor Station)
- Windsor (Adventure Bay Water Park)
- Windsor (Windsor Sculpture Park or Willistead Manor)
- Windsor (Rock Bottom Bar & Grill)
- Port Alma (Port Alma Wind Farm)
- Point Pelee National Park (Point Pelee)

Episode summary

- After being informed at the previous Pit Stop that they were still racing, the remaining teams were asked trivia questions related to previous legs by Jon before boarding a bus to Toronto. The last team with a correct answer received the final spot on the earlier of two trains to their next destination: Windsor, Ontario. Once there, teams found their next clue inside a marked vehicle at the train station.
- At Adventure Bay Water Park, teams had to search in the water slides and around the park for three different coloured rubber ducks, which they could exchange for their next clue. The first team to complete this task won an additional $5,000. Tyler & Kayleen won this prize.
- This leg's Detour was a choice between Sculpt or Swing. In Sculpt, teams had to assemble magnetic pieces in order to form a replica of Windsor Sculpture Park's Salutation sculpture before receiving their next clue. In Swing, teams had to don 1920s period dress and perform a two-minute swing dance routine in order to receive their next clue.
- For this leg's Face Off, two teams had to compete against each other in a game of No Limit Texas Hold' em. Each team member received two cards, with which they could either raise, call, or fold. The team who won the most chips in ten hands received their next clue, while the losing team had to wait for another team. The last team remaining at the Face Off had to wait out a time penalty before moving on.
- After the Face Off, teams had to drive to Port Alma Wind Farm. There, one team member had to climb the inside of a wind turbine to find a conversion chart of kilowatt outputs. Using this information, they then had to correctly solve a mathematical formula to determine how many homes a single turbine can power in a 24-hour period in order to receive their next clue directing them to the Pit Stop: Point Pelee National Park.

=== Leg 8 (Ontario → Quebec) ===
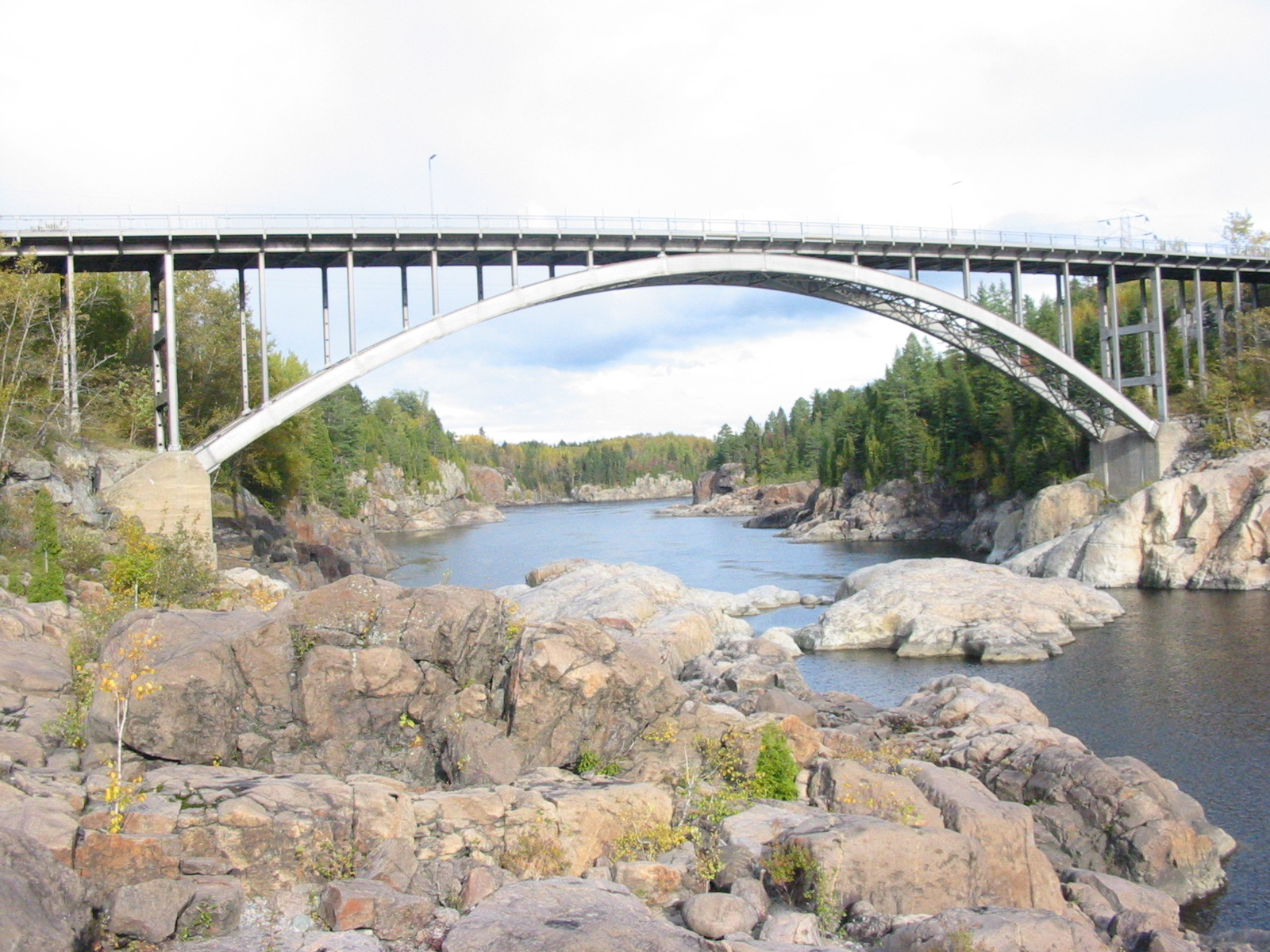
Teams travelled to the Pont d'aluminium d'Arvida in Saguenay, Quebec.

- Episode 8: "I Should Have Made Snowmen" (August 29, 2023)
- Prize: A trip for two to Valparaíso, Chile (awarded to Tyler & Kayleen)
- Eliminated: Jermaine & Justin

Locations

- Windsor (Dieppe Gardens)
- Windsor → Montreal, Quebec
- Montreal → Saguenay (Bagotville Airport)
- Saguenay (Rio Tinto Arvida Research and Development Centre)
- Saguenay (Université du Québec à Chicoutimi or Centre Amusement SPK)
- Saguenay (Pont d'aluminium d'Arvida (in French))
- Saguenay (La Baie – Centre Plein Air Bec-Scie)
- Saint-Fulgence (Parc Aventures Cap Jaseux)
- Saguenay (Chicoutimi – La Pulperie de Chicoutimi (in French))

Episode summary

- At the start of this leg, teams were instructed to travel to Saguenay, Quebec. Once there, teams had to search a marked truck outside of the airport for their next clue, which directed them to travel to the Rio Tinto Arvida Research and Development Centre. There, teams had to use a digital microscope to find a nano-sized French word engraved on a piece of aluminum in order to receive their next clue.
- This season's final Detour was a choice between Snow or Go. In Snow, teams would have entered a walk-in freezer full of snow, where they would have had to recreate a piece of snowmen artwork using stencils and spray paint in order to receive their next clue. In Go, one team member had to drive a go-kart around a track in exactly one minute while being coached by their partner in order to receive their next clue. All teams chose to drive go-karts.
- After the Detour, teams had to drive to the Pont d'aluminium d'Arvida in order to find their next clue. Teams then had to drive to the Centre Plein Air Bec-Scie and carry a tourtière through an obstacle course in order to receive their next clue.
- In this leg's Roadblock, one team member had to navigate a via ferrata above the Saguenay River and memorize the key for an alpha-numeric code. Teams then had to decipher a series of numbers in order to form the name of the next Pit Stop: LA PULPERIE.

=== Leg 9 (Quebec → Ontario) ===
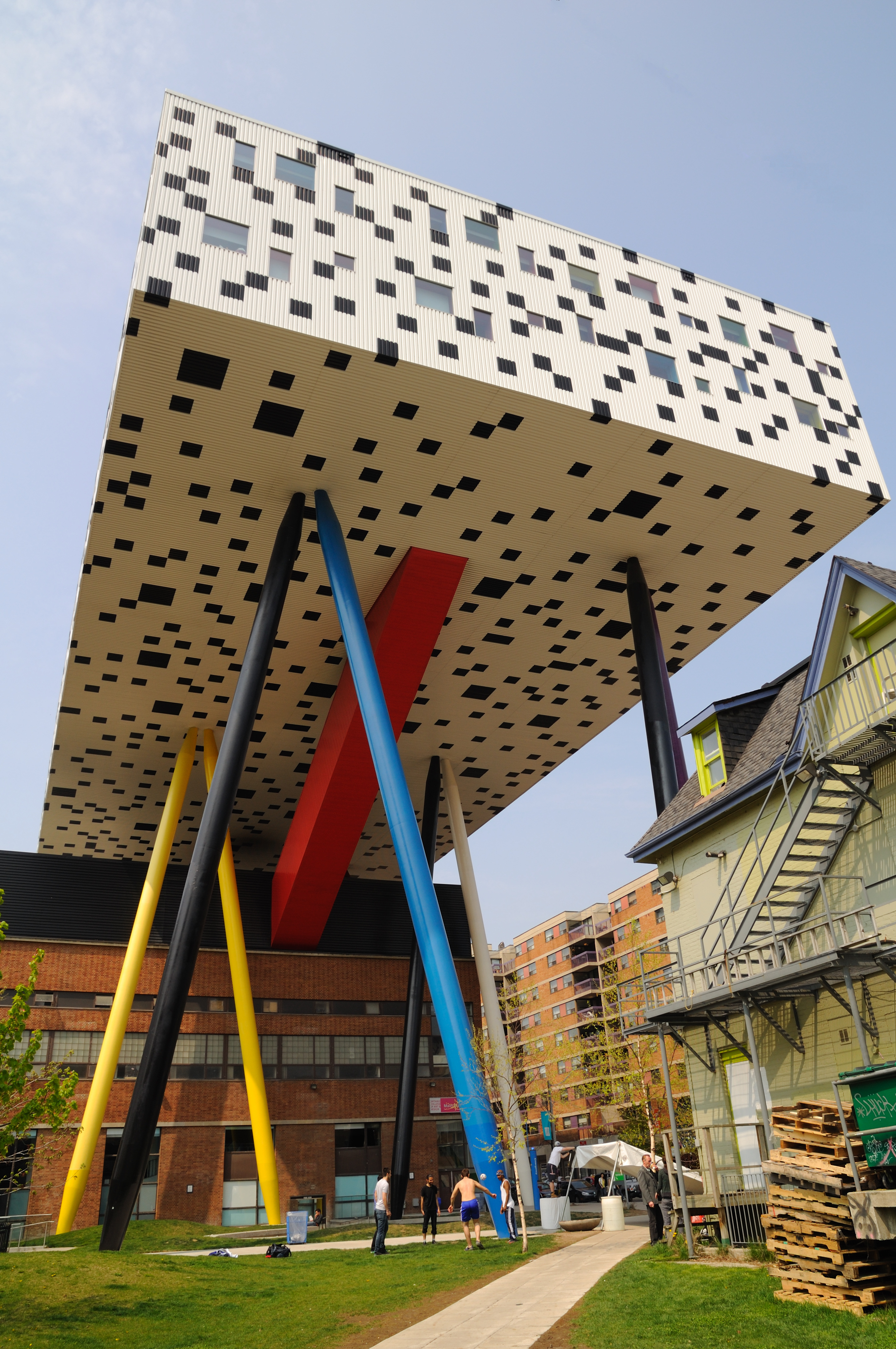
In Toronto, racers had to climb up a pillar at OCAD University during the Roadblock.

- Episode 9: "Light the Candle" (September 5, 2023) & Episode 10: "Do You Want Some Candies?" (September 12, 2023)
- Prize: A trip for two to Melbourne, Australia (awarded to Tyler & Kayleen)
- Eliminated: Deven & Amanda

Locations

- Saguenay (Vieux-Port de Chicoutimi)
- Saguenay → Montreal
- Montreal (Montreal Central Station) → Toronto, Ontario (Union Station)
- Toronto (Toronto Stock Exchange)
- Toronto (OCAD University)
- Toronto (Hotel X Toronto – 10XTO)
- Toronto (Immersion Room)
- Toronto (Kensington Market – Fika Cafe)
- Toronto (Kensington Market, Parkdale, Koreatown & Chinatown)
- Toronto (Sunnyside Beach)

Episode summary (Episode 9)

- At the start of this leg, teams were instructed to travel to Toronto, Ontario. First, teams had to fly to Montreal and find a marked Via Rail counter at the Montreal Central Station in order to obtain tickets for one of two trains to Union Station. Once there, teams had to travel to the Toronto Stock Exchange and then wait to ring the opening bell with Jon the next morning before receiving their next clue. Teams left the stock exchange in the order that they arrived the previous night.
- In this leg's Roadblock, one team member had to use a mechanical ascender to climb to the top of a 90-foot (27 m) pillar at OCAD University, retrieve their next clue, and rappel back down to their partner.
- For this season's final Face Off, two teams had to compete against each other in a best-of-five games of tennis. The team who won three games received their next clue, while the losing team had to wait for another team. The last team remaining at the Face Off had to wait out a time penalty before moving on.

Episode summary (Episode 10)

- After the Face Off, teams had to travel to the Immersion Room, dress as astronauts, and memorize a script for an alien encounter written in an alien language. Teams then had to perform without error and then take a selfie with the alien in order to receive their next clue.
- After the alien language task, teams had to travel to the Fika Cafe at Kensington Market in order to find their next clue. Teams then had to find five marked stores in the market and surrounding neighbourhoods and purchase one food item written on a list at each store. After purchasing specified channa dal, kimchi, plantains, white sesame, and cactus leaves, teams had to deliver them to the cafe in order to receive their next clue directing them to the Pit Stop: Sunnyside Beach.

Additional note

- Leg 9 was spread out over two episodes.

=== Leg 10 (Ontario → Nova Scotia) ===
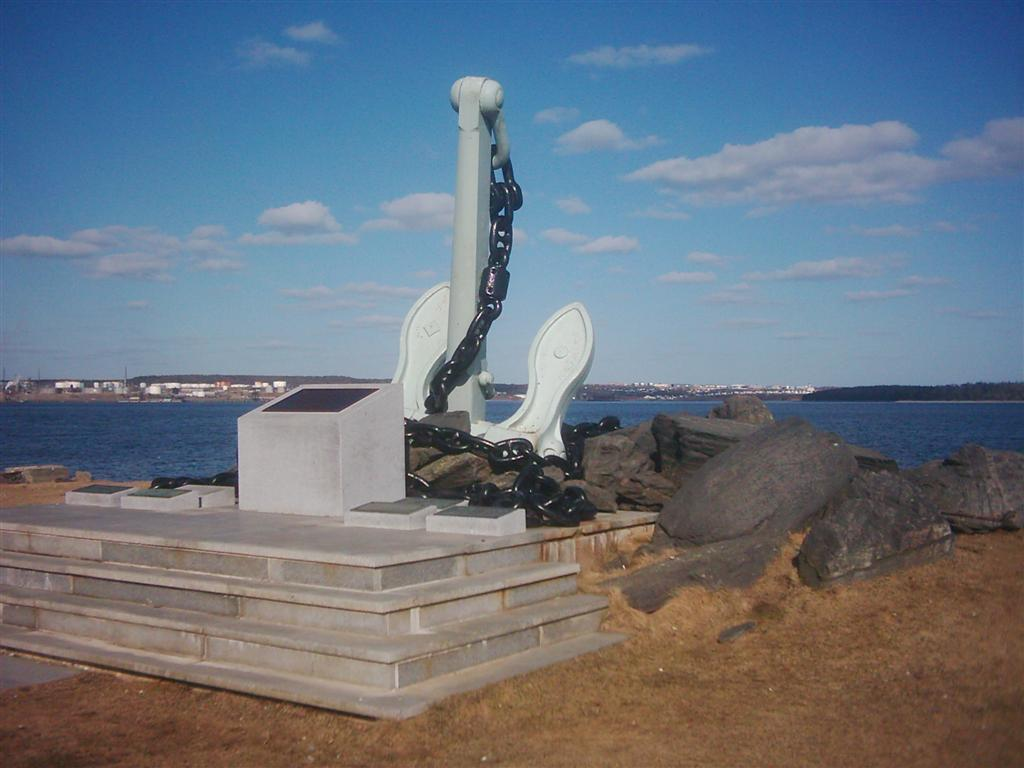
After a final leg in Nova Scotia, The Amazing Race Canada 9 came to an end at the Bonaventure Anchor.

- Episode 11: "It's Zebra Time" (September 19, 2023)
- Prizes: CA$250,000, a trip for two around the world, and two Chevrolet Colorado ZR2s
- Winners: Ty & Kat
- Runners-up: Tyler & Kayleen
- Third place: Ben & Anwar

Locations

- Toronto (Ontario Legislative Building)
- Toronto → Halifax, Nova Scotia
- Eastern Passage (Fisherman's Cove)
- Shearwater (CFB Shearwater)
- Halifax (Staples)
- Dartmouth (Dartmouth Alderney Ferry Terminal)
- Halifax (Woozles Bookstore)
- Halifax (Grand Parade)
- Halifax (Halifax Waterfront Boardwalk – Sea Halifax) and Halifax Harbour (Georges Island)
- Halifax (Halifax Waterfront Boardwalk – Queen's Marque)
- Halifax (Point Pleasant Park – Bonaventure Anchor)

Episode summary

- At the start of the leg, teams were instructed to fly to Halifax, Nova Scotia. Once there, teams found their next clue at Fisherman's Cove.
- In this leg's first Roadblock, one team member had to board a RCAF CH-148 Cyclone helicopter and direct a pilot to drop a payload onto a target within five minutes in order to receive their next clue.
- After the first Roadblock, teams had to travel to a Staples store and find a marked kiosk in order to receive a smartphone with a photograph of the location of their next clue: the ferry at the Dartmouth Alderney Ferry Terminal. Teams then had to travel to Woozles Bookstore, memorize three children's books, and arrange photographs from the books in chronological order in order to receive their next clue sending them to the Grand Parade. There, teams took part in a Royal Nova Scotia International Tattoo and had to perform three dances – a Highland dance, a fancy shawl dance, and a Punjabi banghra – in order to receive their next clue sending them to Sea Halifax.
- In this season's final Roadblock, the team member who did not perform the previous Roadblock had to drive a personal watercraft through a slalom course off of Georges Island and retrieve a zebra split swim ring within 75 seconds in order to receive their next clue.
- After the second Roadblock, teams had to travel to Queen's Marque and complete a 25-word crossword puzzle based on previous legs in order to receive their final clue directing them to the finish line: the Bonaventure Anchor.

Correct answers
Entry	Answer
2 Across	Helicopter
5 Across	Paddle
8 Across	Alien
10 Across	Backpack
11 Across	Vault
12 Across	Victoria
15 Across	Plane
16 Across	Golfball
18 Across	Tofino
20 Across	Whistler
23 Across	Train

Correct answers
Entry	Answer
1 Down	Clue
3 Down	Poker
4 Down	Calgary
6 Down	Table
7 Down	Waterslide
9 Down	Engine
13 Down	Castle
14 Down	Taco
17 Down	Fish
19 Down	Ice
20 Down	Wine
21 Down	Tennis
22 Down	Radio
23 Down	Tree

== Ratings ==
The ninth season of The Amazing Race Canada was the top rated Canadian original program of 2023 with an average viewership of 1.72 million.
