= Aranha =

Aranha (Portuguese pronunciation: [a'ɾɐɲɐ]) is a Portuguese surname, meaning spider. Notable people with the name include:

== Surname ==
- Graça Aranha (1868–1931), Brazilian writer
- Jermaine Aranha, Canadian drag queen
- José Aranha (born 1951), Brazilian freestyle swimmer
- Osvaldo Aranha (1894–1960), Brazilian politician, diplomat and statesman
- Ray Aranha (1939–2011), American actor, playwright, and stage director

== Nickname ==
- Aranha (footballer, born 1980) (Mário Lúcio Costa Duarte), Brazilian footballer
- Aranha (footballer, born 1946) (Antônio Aranha Alves), Brazilian footballer
