= Claire Beaulieu =

Canadian artist

- Born: 1955 (age 69–70); Arvida, Quebec, Canada
- Education: Université du Québec à Montréal 1982
- Alma mater: Université du Québec à Montréal 1990
- Known for: Painter; Sculptor; Installation artist Graphic artist
- Website: www.clairebeaulieu.com

Claire Beaulieu (born 1955) is a Canadian artist. She works in the fields of painting, sculpture, installation and drawing.

== Early life ==
Beaulieu was born in 1955 in Arvida, Quebec, and now lives and works in Montreal. She earned both her fine arts degrees from the Université du Québec à Montréal, completing her Master's of Fine Arts in 1990.

== Career ==
From 1991 until 1994, she was a professor at Université du Québec à Hull. Starting in 1996, she became a professor at Cégep du Vieux Montréal. Prior to that, she also taught at Cégep André-Laurendeau and the Université de Montréal.

Her work is included in the collection of the Musée national des beaux-arts du Québec.
