= Sykesville Bypass Bridge =

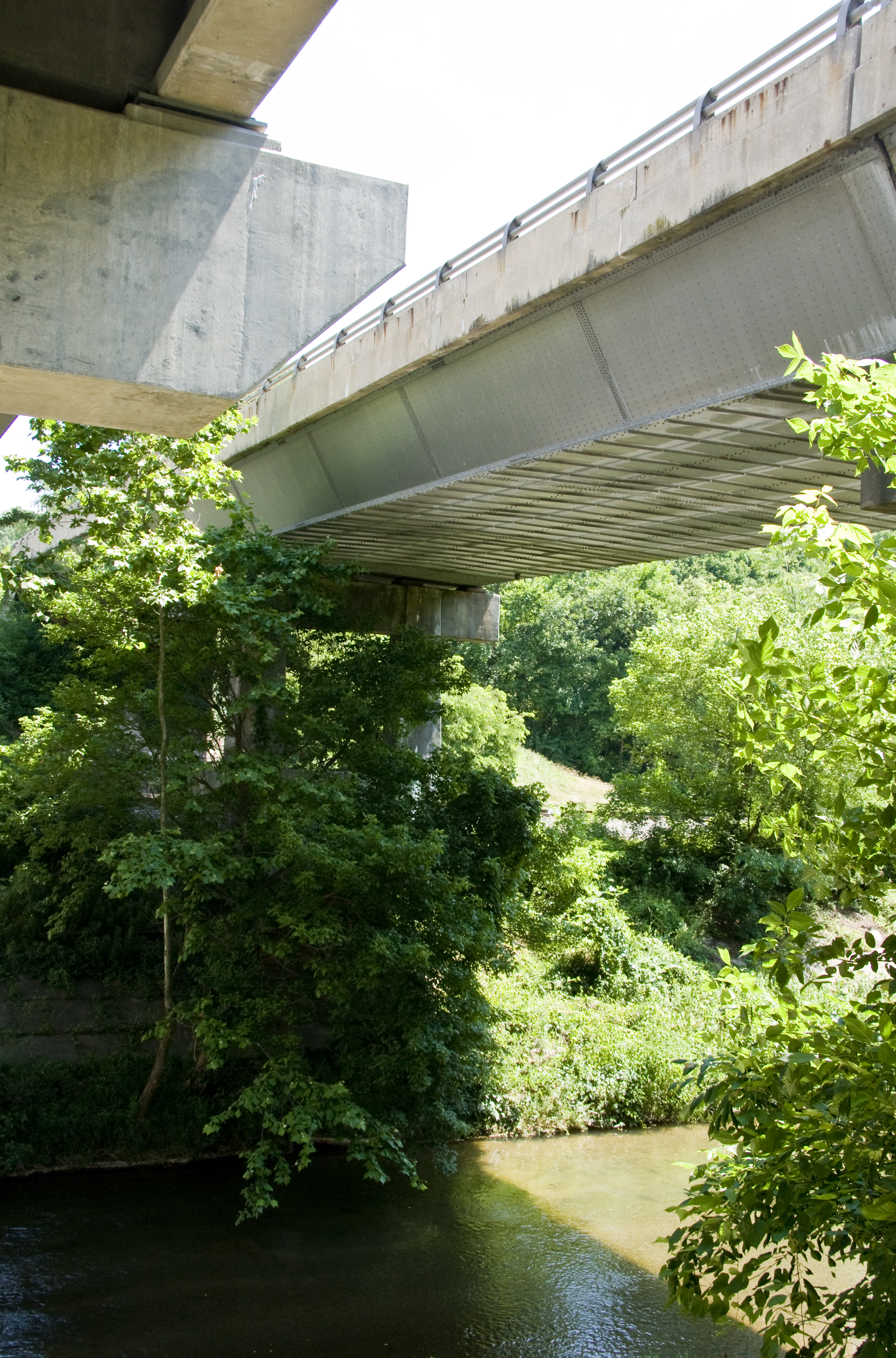
- The Sykesville Bypass Bridge in 2009
- Coordinates: 39°21′44″N 76°58′01″W
- Crosses: Patapsco River
- Locale: Sykesville, Maryland

Characteristics
- Design: Box girder
- Material: Aluminum
- Total length: 293 ft (89 m)
- Width: 35 ft (11 m)
- No. of spans: 3

History
- Designer: Harry Kahn
- Construction start: 1961
- Construction end: 1963
- Opened: 1963
- Closed: 2002

Statistics
- Sykesville Bypass Bridge
- U.S. National Register of Historic Places
- NRHP reference No.: 100011131
- Added to NRHP: December 6, 2024

Location
- Interactive map of Sykesville Bypass Bridge

The Sykesville Bypass Bridge is a three-span, aluminum box girder highway bridge near Sykesville, Maryland. It is the longest example of a significant bridge structure employing aluminum as the primary load-carrying element to be built in the United States. It was opened to traffic on Maryland Route 32 in 1963, and was closed in 2002 due to structural deterioration. It remains standing next to its replacement.

== History ==
The bridge was constructed in 1963 as a prototype for the widespread employment of aluminum as a primary structural component of highway bridges. It was fabricated as a collaborative venture between the Maryland State Roads Commission and International Aluminum Structures, Inc. Design work was carried out by the Kinetics Division of the Fairchild Engine and Airplane Corporation under the supervision of Harry Kahn. The Fairchild division was exploring design methods for aluminum structures that would compensate for the relatively high price of aluminum versus steel through efficient design techniques. The semi-monocoque design, using triangulated box beams, developed by Fairchild created much less structural weight than an equivalent steel structure, allowing the overall material use to be lessened, and bought benefits of corrosion resistance. Fairchild created a new company, American Aluminum Structures, to promote the concept.

A prototype design was tested in 1959 using a 50-foot (15 m) structural test specimen. The Route 32 bypass to the east of Sykesville provided the location for the first full-sized use of the technique. However, by 1960 Fairchild had apparently lost interest in the project and did not pursue any others. Work was completed in late 1962, and the bridge and bypass were opened in early 1963. The Sykesville Bypass bridge turned out to be the longest triangular-beam aluminum bridge ever built, and one of only three ever built using that design.

After thirty years of service the concrete supporting piers were repaired and the steel bearing pads were replaced. The isolation pads, meant to prevent galvanic corrosion between the steel and the aluminum were not replaced. This led to accelerated corrosion of the aluminum. At the same time, poor internal drainage created problems in areas where water laden with road salt could accumulate within the structure. By 2002 the bridge was no longer suitable for road traffic and was closed, but left standing. The new bridge was designed and built according to conventional steel construction techniques. Although aluminum structures continued to be used in Europe, where maintenance costs are more closely factored into choices concerning capital investments, there has been no significant use of aluminum since that time for a major bridge structure in the United States.

The Sykesville bridge was one of six built in the United States, as well as one in Canada, between 1948 and 1963. The first was built over the Grasse River on a railroad line in Massena, New York in 1946 to serve an aluminum smelter, using a riveted plate girder design. The Arvida Bridge was built in 1950 over the Saguenay River in Quebec to serve an aluminum smelter belonging to the Aluminum Company of Canada. An overpass on Interstate 80 in Des Moines, Iowa was built in 1958 using welded plate girders. In 1959 plate girder aluminum bridges were built on Long Island, New York on the Jericho Turnpike, and in 1961 an aluminum bridge using a similar triangular box girder concept was built over the Appomattox River on Virginia Route 36 in Chesterfield County, Virginia. A final box girder aluminum bridge was built on the Sunrise Highway near Amityville, New York in 1963.

== Description ==
Located on Maryland Route 32, the Sykesville Bypass Bridge comprises a section of highway built over the South Branch of the Patapsco River and the Old Main Line Subdivision of the B&O Railroad,just to the west of Sykesville, Maryland. The original path of Route 32 passed through the center of the town, which occupies a confined area in a deep ravine. The bridge has three spans over a total length of 297 feet (91 m) and is 35 feet (11 m) wide. The triangular beams are 67 inches (170 cm) deep and 7 feet (2.1 m) wide. The design resembles that of an airplane wing, using the skin for its principal strength, with reinforcement at points of higher stress. The box beam assembly has a bottom skin of aluminum that carries the structure's tension load. The aluminum structural assembly is topped with a conventional concrete road deck, and is supported by concrete piers.

== Historic designation ==
Following the bridge's closure the site was marked with an interpretive plaque. It was placed on the National Register of Historic Places on December 6, 2024.

== See also ==
- List of bridges on the National Register of Historic Places in Maryland
- National Register of Historic Places listings in Howard County, Maryland
