= Arvida Bridge =

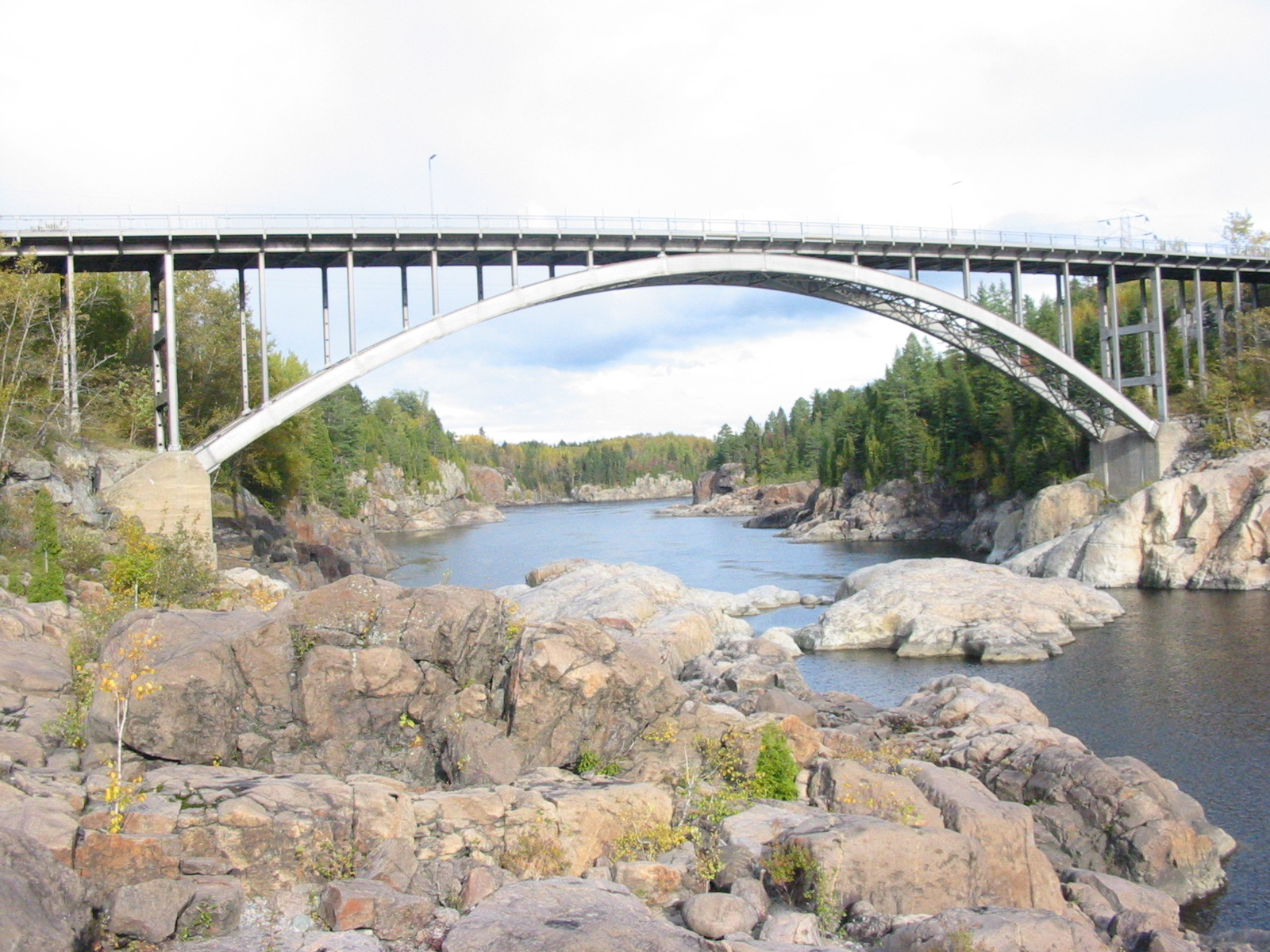
- Arvida Bridge
- Coordinates: 48°26′41″N 71°13′6.3″W
- Crosses: Saguenay River
- Locale: Jonquiere, Quebec

Characteristics
- Design: Deck arch
- Material: Aluminum
- Total length: 153.2m
- Height: 32.91m
- Longest span: 91.5m
- No. of spans: 1

History
- Designer: Dominion Bridge Company
- Construction start: 1949
- Construction end: 1950
- Opened: 1950

Location
- Interactive map of Arvida Bridge

The Arvida Bridge is a deck arch bridge over the Saguenay River at Saguenay, Quebec. Built in 1950, it is one of the first in the world whose main structure was entirely made of aluminum, and is the longest aluminum bridge in the world.

== History ==
The Arvida Bridge was conceived as a demonstration project to promote the Canadian aluminum industry as early as the 1920s. Aluminum production was concentrated in the Saguenay Valley where an abundance of hydroelectric power was available. The bridge serves one of the power stations on the Saguenay, and is close to the aluminum smelter in Arvida, Quebec. The bridge concept was developed beginning in 1943 by W.L. Pugh of the Alcan Aluminum Laboratories, engineer Olivier Desjardins, landscape architect Frederic G. Todd, and architect Harold Lee Featherstonhaugh. An arch design was selected as more visually appealing than a truss structure. The Dominion Bridge Company was brought into the project in 1946, with C.J. Pimenoff as supervising engineer. Construction began in 1949, by the Pic Construction firm of Jonquiere. Supervising engineers were Nenninger & Chenevert of Montreal. The bridge was opened on July 16, 1950.

The bridge was designated a historic structure by Quebec in 2004, the City of Saguenay in 2005, and in 2008 was designated a historic civil engineering heritage site by the Canadian Society for Civil Engineering.

The Arvida bridge was one of six built in North America between 1948 and 1963. The first was built over the Grasse River on a railroad line in Massena, New York in 1946 to serve an aluminum smelter, using a riveted plate girder design. An overpass on Interstate 80 in Des Moines, Iowa was built in 1958 using welded plate girders. In 1959 plate girder aluminum bridges were built on Long Island, New York on the Jericho Turnpike, and in 1961 an aluminum bridge using a similar triangular box girder concept was built over the Appomattox River on Virginia Route 36 in Chesterfield County, Virginia. Two more box girder aluminum bridges were built in 1963, on the Sunrise Highway near Amityville, New York, and the Sykesville Bypass Bridge in Maryland.

== Description ==
The bridge is a parabolic open-spandrel deck arch, 504 feet (154 m) long, with a clear span of 300 feet (91 m), 108 feet (33 m) above a branch of the Saguenay River. The bridge carries the Route du Pont near the Shipshaw II power station, north of Jonquiere-Kenogami. The bridge uses 43 tonnes (47 short tons) of 2014-T6 alloy aluminum, weighting about 43 percent less than an equivalent steel structure. Its total weight amounts to about 150 tonnes (170 short tons). The riveted connections use 16ST alloy. Railings, light fixtures and decorative elements are all aluminum. Design loads took into account the possibility of heavy transformers being moved to the power station, and considered extreme levels of temperature variation.
