= British Methodist Episcopal Church, Salem Chapel =

Salem Chapel, British Methodist Episcopal Church
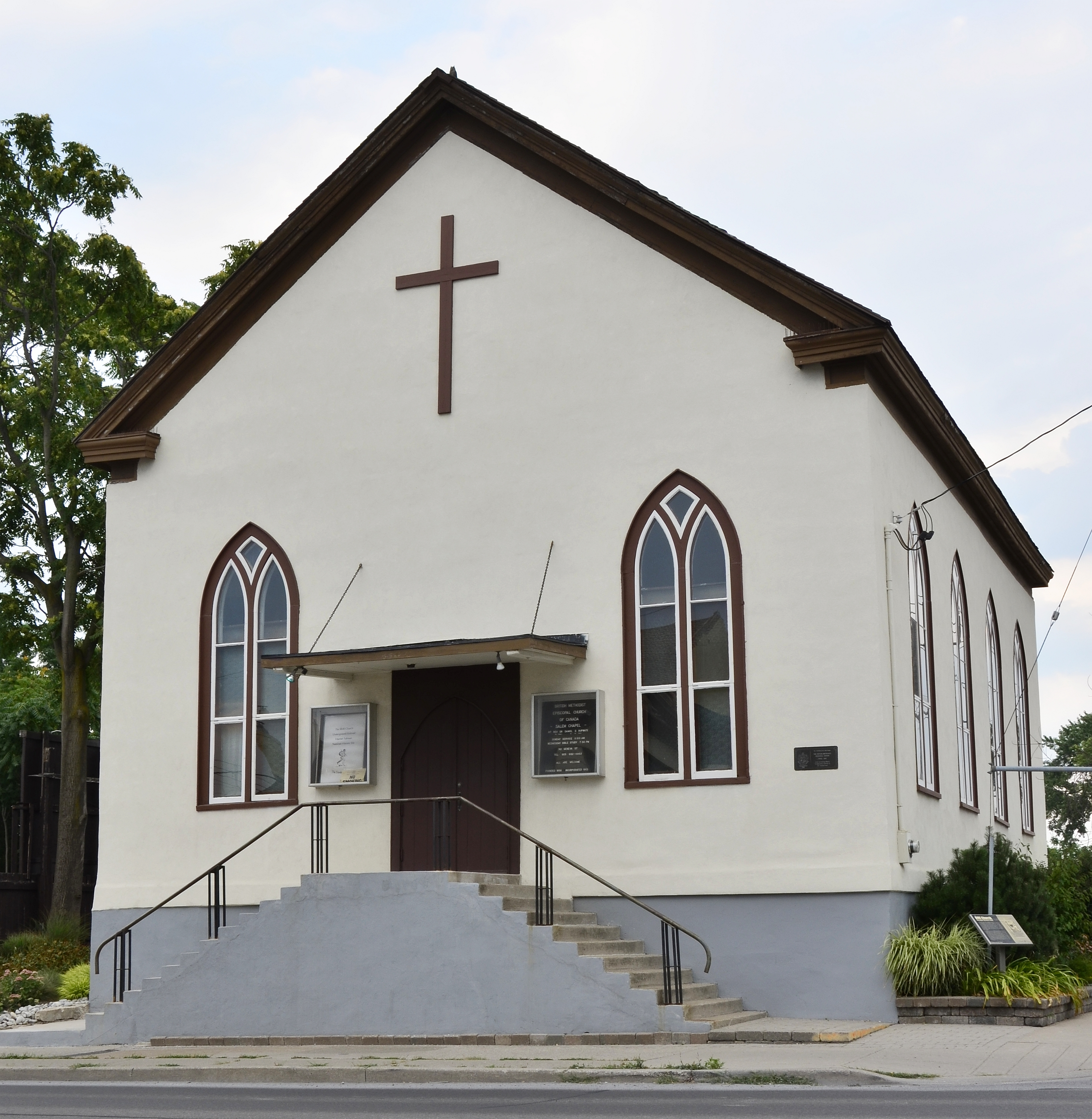
- The Salem Chapel in 2012
- Interactive map of Salem Chapel, British Methodist Episcopal Church
- Location: St. Catharines, Ontario
- Coordinates: 43.165067°N 79.240167°W
- Built: 1855
- Important events: Underground Railroad, Harriet Tubman

National Historic Site of Canada
- Designated: 1999

The British Methodist Episcopal (BME) Church, Salem Chapel was founded in 1820 by African-American freedom seekers in St. Catharines, Ontario. It is located at 92 Geneva St., in the heart of Old St. Catharines. The church is a valued historical site due to its design, and its important associations with abolitionist activity.

The church has a congregation of approximately 20 people, and a Sunday worship service takes place at 11:00 am. Guided tours of the church and museum, which displays original documents, artifacts, and a rare book collection, all associated with the anti-slavery movement, are available by appointment.

== History ==
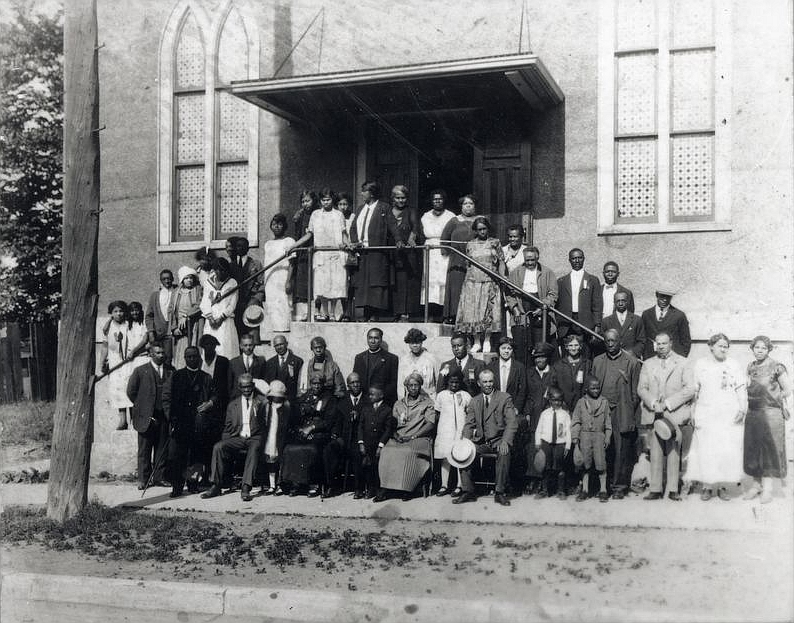
A group on the front steps of Salem Chapel, 1925

The Salem Chapel was an important centre of abolitionist and civil rights activity, and was the cornerstone of a growing community of African-American refugees from the United States. The most famous and celebrated member of the church was Harriet Tubman, who lived in the area from 1851 to 1858, and led many fugitives to freedom via the Underground Railroad (UGGR) to St. Catharines, Ontario.

As of 1851, the church was known as Bethel Chapel, AME Church, and resided in a small log building which was constructed by black freedom seekers. In 1853, it was decided that a larger building was needed in order to respond to the growing Methodist population settling in the area.

Passage of the Fugitive Slave Act in the United States in 1850 caused some ex-slave preachers to fear travel to church conferences in the U.S., which might expose them to capture. Reverend Benjamin Stewart of Chatham suggested churches in the United Canadas form a separate organization, and this was adopted at the AME Church's 1856 conference in Philadelphia. The name British Methodist Episcopal Church was selected to recognize British America as a safe haven from slavery.

At the Canadian General Conference in 1856, some of the AME Churches changed their names to reflect the new organization's name, including the Bethel Chapel in St. Catharines. Bethel was renamed the Salem Chapel in 1957.

== Heritage value ==
Salem Chapel was designated a National Historic Site in 1999, and is marked outside by several historical markers and a bust of Tubman. The heritage value of this church resides in its exceptional associations with the anti-slavery movement and the early black community to which it bears witness, as illustrated by the church with its auditory-hall form, typical of early African Canadian churches. A provincial historical plaque to Tubman was joined by a civic heritage marker concerning the building. Since then, the national Historic Sites and Monuments Board has erected two federal plaques: one to the chapel as a national historic site, the other to Tubman as a national historic person.

== Architecture and design of the church ==
Salem Chapel is a well-preserved, 3-level chapel which is gable-fronted and set on a high foundation. The stucco building is distinguished by its regularly arranged pointed-arch windows, modest scale and overall simplicity. The chapel has an auditory-hall design which is typical of churches associated with the Underground Railroad (UGRR) movement.

Other key physical elements of the church include:

- the central entry door on one gable end, set between two large pointed-arch windows and approached by a split staircase;
- four regularly spaced pointed arch windows on each side elevation;
- wood construction materials, wood trim, and stone foundation;
- high basement;
- simple interior finishes, including a restored, hand-painted stencil border circling the upper gallery;
- and surviving original fittings including the long single-log walnut benches.
