= Arvida =

Settlement in Quebec, Canada

Coordinates: 48°26′N 71°11′W

Arvida (/ɑːrˈvaɪdə/ ar-VY-də) is a settlement of 12,000 people (2010) in Quebec, Canada, that is part of the City of Saguenay. Its name is derived from the name of its founder, Arthur Vining Davis, president of the Alcoa aluminum company.

Arvida was founded as an industrial city by Alcoa in 1927, when the first aluminum smelter was constructed. Located 240 kilometres (150 mi) north of Quebec City, south of the Saguenay River between Chicoutimi and Jonquière, the town was planned from the first day and was developed as a company town, to have a population of about 14,000 inhabitants, four Catholic parishes, and many other denominations, parishes and schools. It was known as "the City Built in 135 Days" and described by The New York Times as a "model town for working families" on "a North Canada steppe". Uranium City was modelled after Arvida.

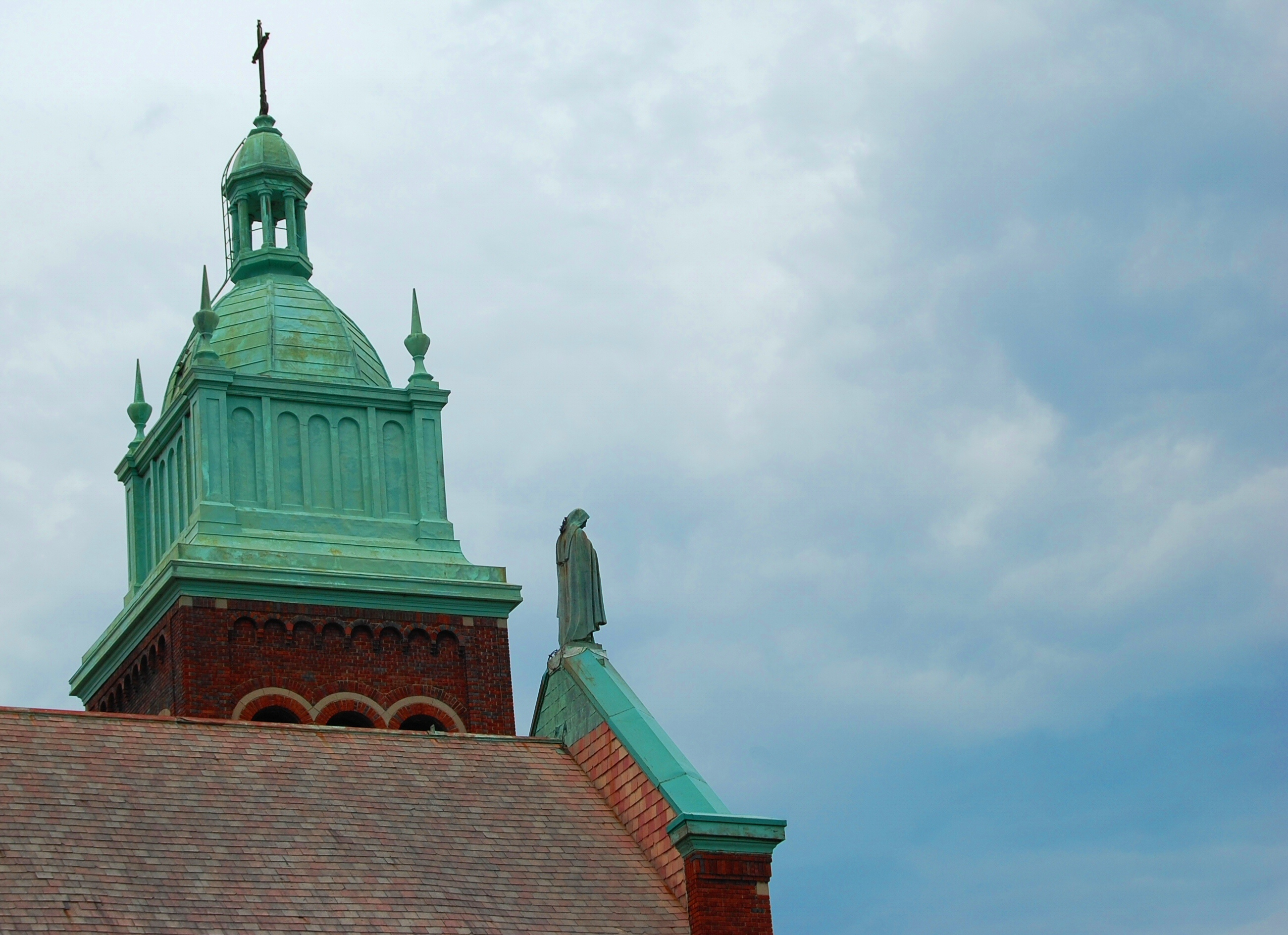
Église Ste-Thérèse-de-l'enfant-Jésus

The smelter complex at Arvida was the largest aluminum plant in the world from 1943 to 1975 and they produced two-thirds of the aluminum used by the World War II Allied forces.

== History ==
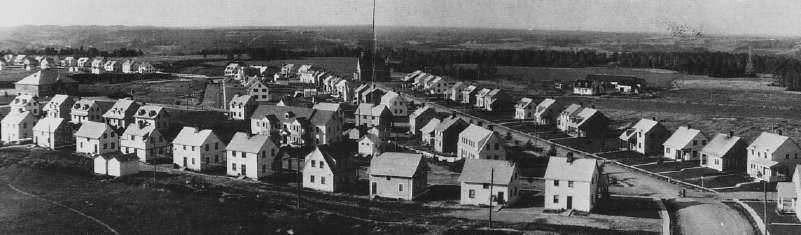
Arvida in 1928

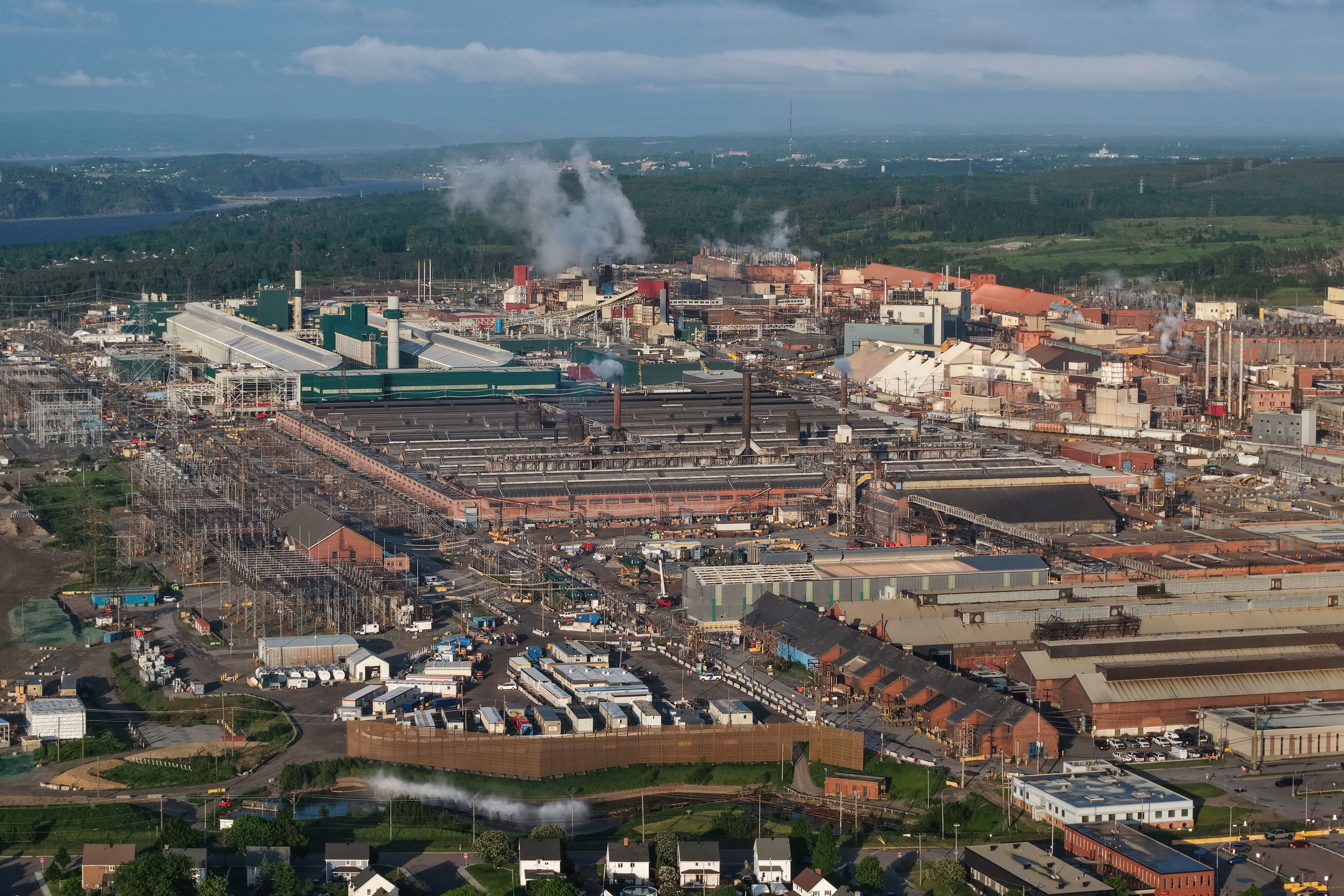
Aerial view of Rio Tinto Alcan's Arvida aluminum complex

In 1912 James B. Duke purchased the rights to the power on the Saguenay River, and in 1925 the Isle Maligne power station near Lac St. Jean came on stream (then the world's largest). In 1926 more than 250 houses were completed and the first ingots were poured. In 1932 Chute-à-Caron power station near Kénogami came on stream. The Shipshaw power station, just below Chute-à-Caron, came on stream during World War II and the Saguenay Inn in Arvida was completed. In 1950 the Arvida Bridge, an arched aluminum bridge, was completed, spanning the old Saguenay gorge near the Shipshaw power house.

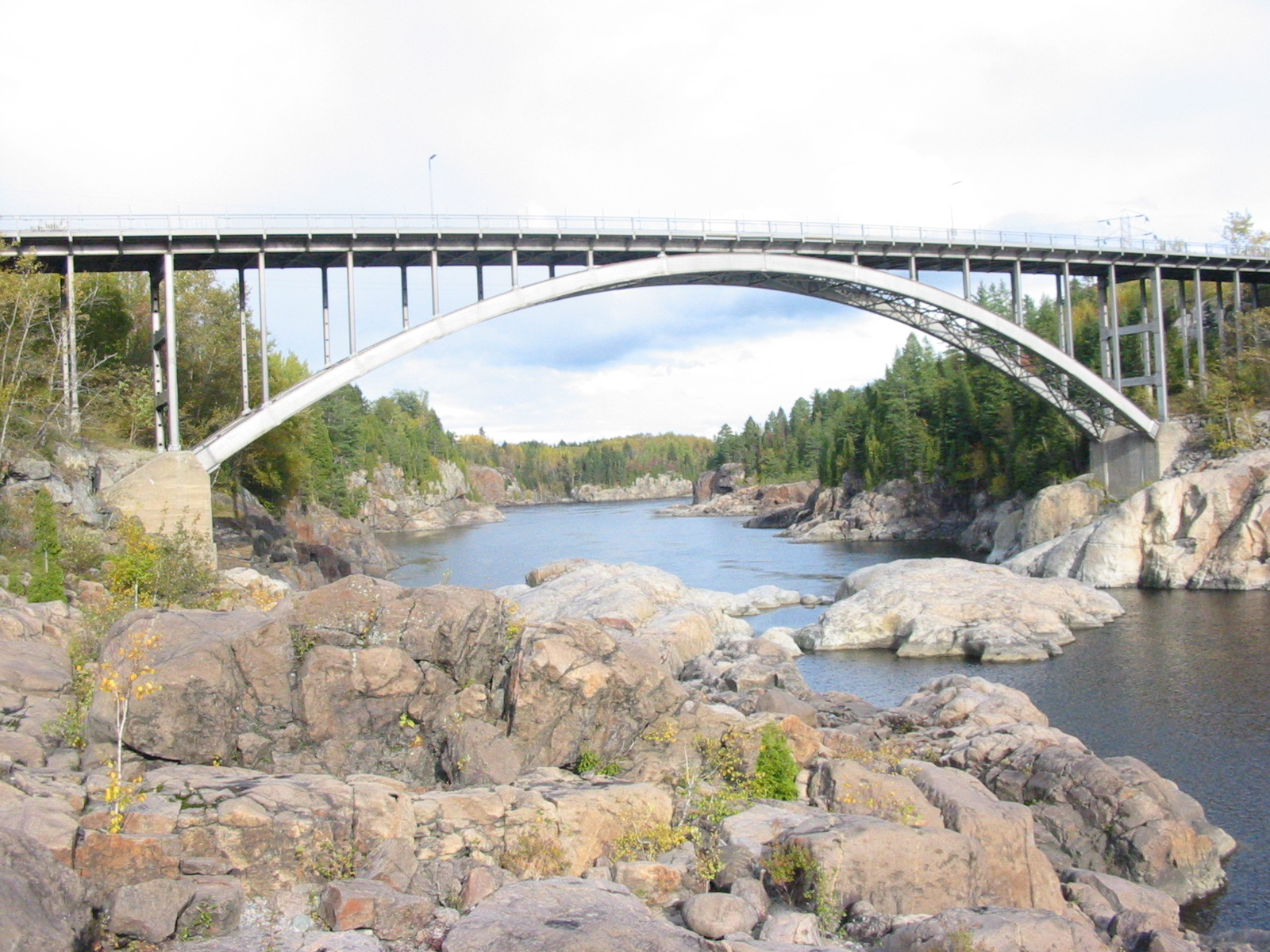
Arvida Bridge

During World War II, the smelter was expanded and a large hydroelectric complex was built on the Saguenay River at Shipshaw generating 1,200,000 horsepower (890,000 kW) of power, becoming the largest aluminum production centre in the Western world. Because of its importance to the Allied war effort, the town was guarded by anti-aircraft batteries. The smelter transforms imported bauxite to alumina, and then to aluminum, by electrolysis. This process, and the smelting plant thereto, employed up to 7,500 people in the 1950s and the 1960s. The plant was due to close in 2005, as it had been replaced by at least three plants constructed during the last ten years in the Saguenay area. Rio Tinto Alcan continues to operate a smelter and related plants in the Arvida area.

In the early 1970s, survivors of the 1971 landslide at nearby Saint-Jean-Vianney were largely resettled to Arvida.

In 1975, the cities of Arvida, Kénogami and Jonquière were amalgamated into a new city, Jonquière. In 2002, this amalgamated Jonquière was merged with Lac-Kénogami, Shipshaw, Chicoutimi, Laterrière, La Baie and Tremblay township into the city of Saguenay.

=== Recognition ===
In 2010, local Councillor Carl Dufour and others sought recognition from Parks Canada as a heritage site, the first step in applying for recognition as a World Heritage Site by UNESCO. The town was declared a National Historic Site in 2012 by the federal government as a "well-preserved example of a Canadian company town".

The province of Quebec declared the Arvida neighbourhood a Canadian Heritage Site in late November, 2018 due to its urban planning, distinctive architecture and landscaping as well as its historical character.

Unfortunately for the town, the federal government did not select Arvida for submission to UNESCO when proposed in 2017. As of 2023, there were 20 World Heritage Sites in Canada, with another 12 on the tentative list.

== Climate ==
Climate data for Arvida
Month	Jan	Feb	Mar	Apr	May	Jun	Jul	Aug	Sep	Oct	Nov	Dec	Year
Record high °C (°F)	13.3 (55.9)	13.9 (57.0)	22.2 (72.0)	28 (82)	34.4 (93.9)	35 (95)	35.6 (96.1)	35 (95)	33 (91)	27.8 (82.0)	22.8 (73.0)	15.6 (60.1)	35.6 (96.1)
Mean daily maximum °C (°F)	−10.3 (13.5)	−8.3 (17.1)	−0.9 (30.4)	7.8 (46.0)	16 (61)	21.7 (71.1)	24.1 (75.4)	22.2 (72.0)	16.6 (61.9)	9.8 (49.6)	2 (36)	−6.8 (19.8)	7.8 (46.0)
Mean daily minimum °C (°F)	−20.1 (−4.2)	−18.2 (−0.8)	−10.8 (12.6)	−1.8 (28.8)	4.4 (39.9)	10.1 (50.2)	13.2 (55.8)	11.9 (53.4)	7.2 (45.0)	2 (36)	−4.4 (24.1)	−15.2 (4.6)	−1.8 (28.8)
Record low °C (°F)	−40 (−40)	−41.7 (−43.1)	−35 (−31)	−19 (−2)	−10 (14)	−1.1 (30.0)	2.2 (36.0)	0 (32)	−6.1 (21.0)	−11.1 (12.0)	−31.1 (−24.0)	−41.1 (−42.0)	−41.7 (−43.1)
Average precipitation mm (inches)	—	—	50.3 (1.98)	45.7 (1.80)	75.7 (2.98)	91.7 (3.61)	114.1 (4.49)	97.4 (3.83)	100.4 (3.95)	72.3 (2.85)	73.2 (2.88)	84.7 (3.33)	—
Source: 1961-1990 Environment Canada

== Culture ==
Landmark of the city is the Église Ste-Thérèse-de-l'enfant-Jésus. In the city's north, there is the Théâtre Palace Arvida, a modern theater for about 500 people.

== Notable people ==
- Artist Claire Beaulieu was born in Arvida.
- Thomas J. Hudson, genome scientist, was born in Arvida in 1961.
- Professional heavyweight champion wrestler Stan Stasiak was born in Arvida.
- Steve Maltais, ice hockey coach for the Chicago Cougars and former professional player
