= Anastarzia Anaquway =

Bahamian drag queen

- Born: Jermaine Aranha; 21 January 1982 (age 44); Nassau, Bahamas
- Other name: Starzy
- Occupation: Drag queen
- Years active: 2002–present
- Television: Canada's Drag Race; The Amazing Race Canada 9
- Spouse: Kenneth Scott (2025)

Jermaine Aranha (born 21 January 1982), better known by the stage name Anastarzia Anaquway, is a Bahamian drag queen and television personality based in Toronto, Ontario, Canada.

She is the only Bahamian to featured in the Drag Race television franchise, having competed in the first season of Canada's Drag Race.

== Career ==
Anaquway, who made her pageant debut in the Miss Bahamas pageant in 2003, has since won over 15 pageants, such as Miss Styles Bahamas, Miss Canada International, Miss Toronto Gay, and Miss Black Continental at Large.

In July 2021, she performed alongside BOA, Juice Boxx, Farra N. Hyte, and TroyBoy at the inaugural Drag Starz at the Manor, a new drag event in Guelph, Ontario.

In 2023, Aranha competed on the ninth season of The Amazing Race Canada with fellow Drag Race contestant Justin Baird (also known as Kimora Amour).

== Personal life ==
Aranha was born and raised in Nassau, Bahamas and has opened up about his experiences with homophobia and hate crime in his home country. Aranha moved to Canada, claiming asylum, after allegedly being shot at in 2013 by two men into his driveway. Aranha's story, told on an episode of Drag Race, was met with a mixed response from Bahamians, ranging from support and solidarity to threats and accusations of lying to make the country look bad.
