= Victoria Bug Zoo =

Victoria Bug Zoo Inc.
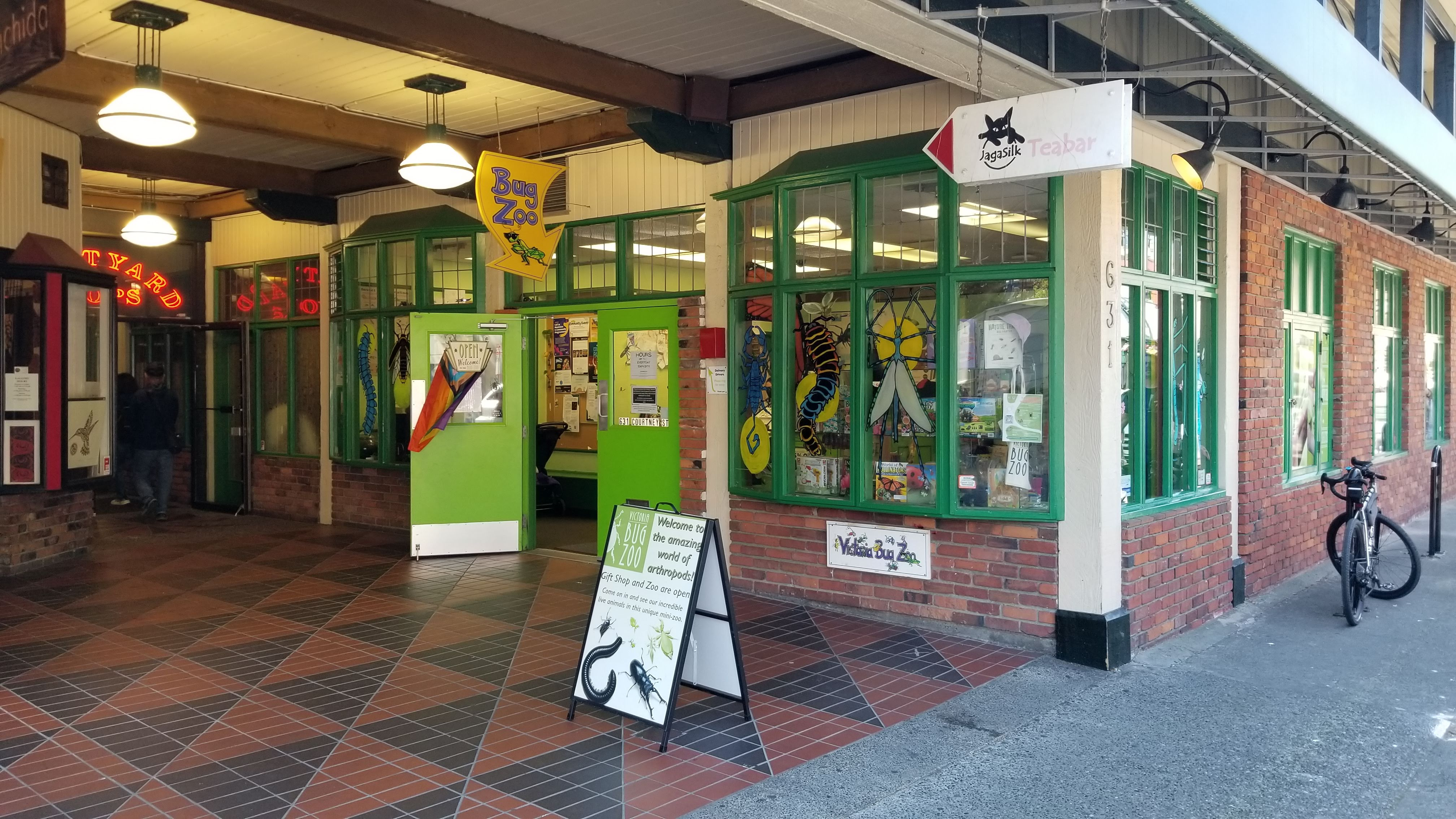
- Victoria Bug Zoo in July 2024
- Interactive map of Victoria Bug Zoo Inc.
- 48°25′24″N 123°22′00″W
- Date opened: 1997
- Location: Victoria, British Columbia, Canada
- No. of species: 50
- Owner: Xing Chen
- Management: Jaymie Chudiak
- Website: https://www.victoriabugzoo.ca/

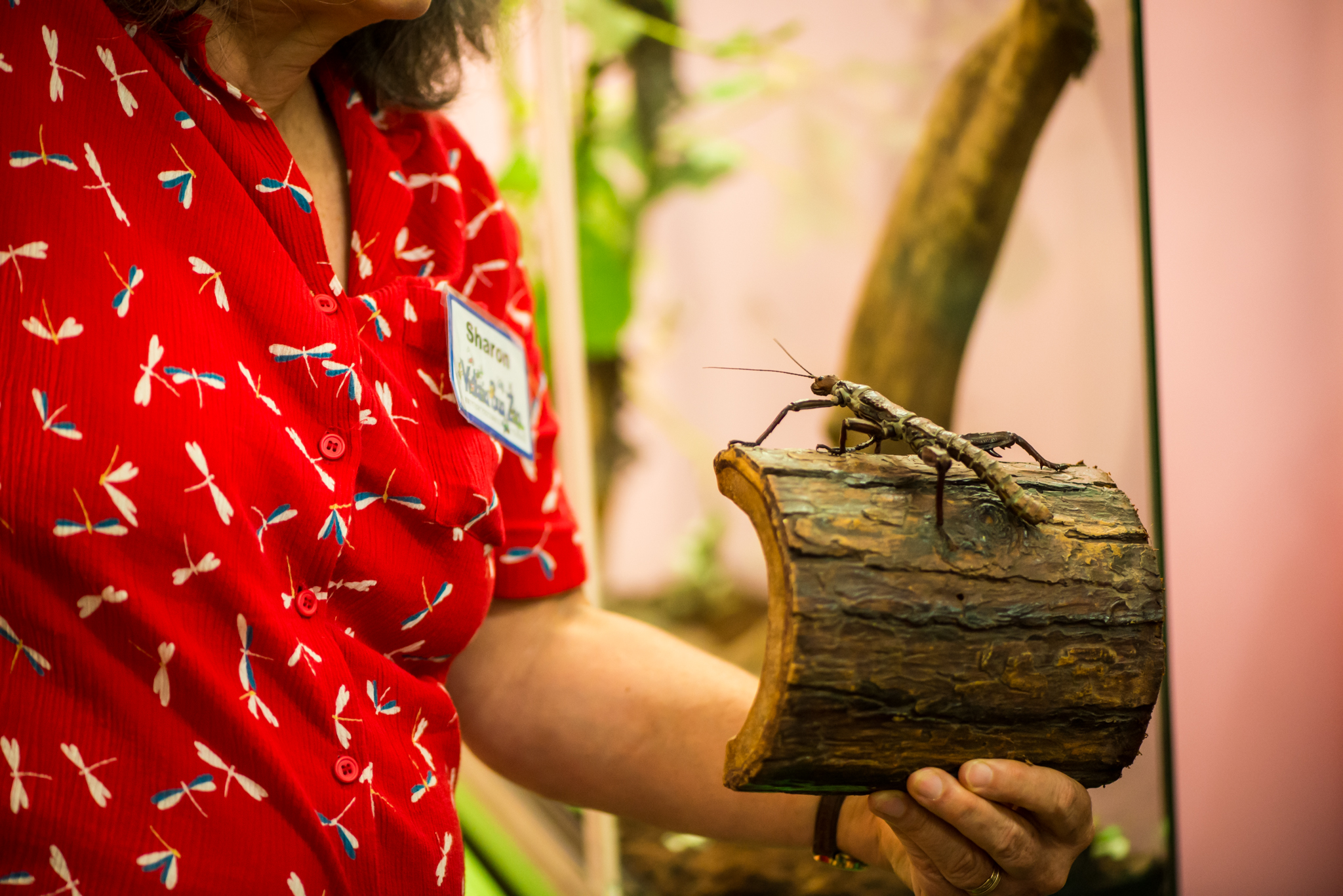
Victoria - Bug Zoo

The Victoria Bug Zoo is a two-room minizoo that is located in downtown Victoria, British Columbia, Canada, one block north of the Fairmont Empress Hotel. It was sold to Xing Chen in 2014. The Victoria Bug Zoo is run by General Manager Jaymie Chudiak.

== Features ==
The Bug Zoo exhibits approximately 50 species of insects, arachnids, and other arthropods, and is currently the largest tropical insect collection in North America. It displays Canada's largest ant farm that contains leaf-cutter ants. It hosts changing exhibits of various arthropod species, allowing visitors to see and interact with animals they may never encounter in the wild. A main focus of the Victoria Bug Zoo is to help people overcome their fears of insects and arachnids in a safe, engaging and informative environment.

Visitors are able to explore the zoo at their own leisure, or follow a guided tour for a hands-on and educational experience. While with a tour guide, visitors can hold and touch a variety of terrestrial arthropods such as tarantulas, cockroaches, scorpions, walking sticks, millipedes, and some praying mantis species.
