= The Amazing Race Canada 7 =

Season of television series

- Season 7
- Presented by: Jon Montgomery
- No. of teams: 10
- Winners: Anthony Johnson & James Makokis
- No. of legs: 11
- Distance traveled: 17,000 km (11,000 mi)
- No. of episodes: 11

Release
- Original network: CTV
- Original release: July 2 – September 10, 2019

Additional information
- Filming dates: April 23 – May 18, 2019

Series chronology
- ← Previous; Season 6 Next → Season 8

The Amazing Race Canada 7 is the seventh season of The Amazing Race Canada, a Canadian reality competition show based on the American series The Amazing Race. Hosted by Jon Montgomery, it featured nine teams of two, each with a pre-existing relationship, and one returning team of two given a second chance to compete by fans in a race across Canada. The grand prize included a CA$250,000 cash payout, a trip for two around the world, and two 2019 Chevrolet Blazer SUVs. This season visited six provinces and one territory and travelled over 17,000 kilometres (11,000 mi) during eleven legs. Starting in Toronto, racers travelled through Ontario, British Columbia, Alberta, the Northwest Territories, Saskatchewan, Quebec, and Nova Scotia before finishing in Muskoka. New twists introduced in this season include the One Way, which allowed teams to force others to complete one specific side of the Detour, and the Blind Detour, where teams learned about the task that they chose after arriving at its location. The season premiered on CTV on July 2, 2019, with the season finale airing on September 10, 2019.

Married First Nations couple Anthony Johnson and James Makokis were the winners of this season, while track teammates Sarah Wells and Sam Effah finished in second place, and sisters Lauren and Joanne Lavoie finished in third place.

== Production ==
=== Development and filming ===
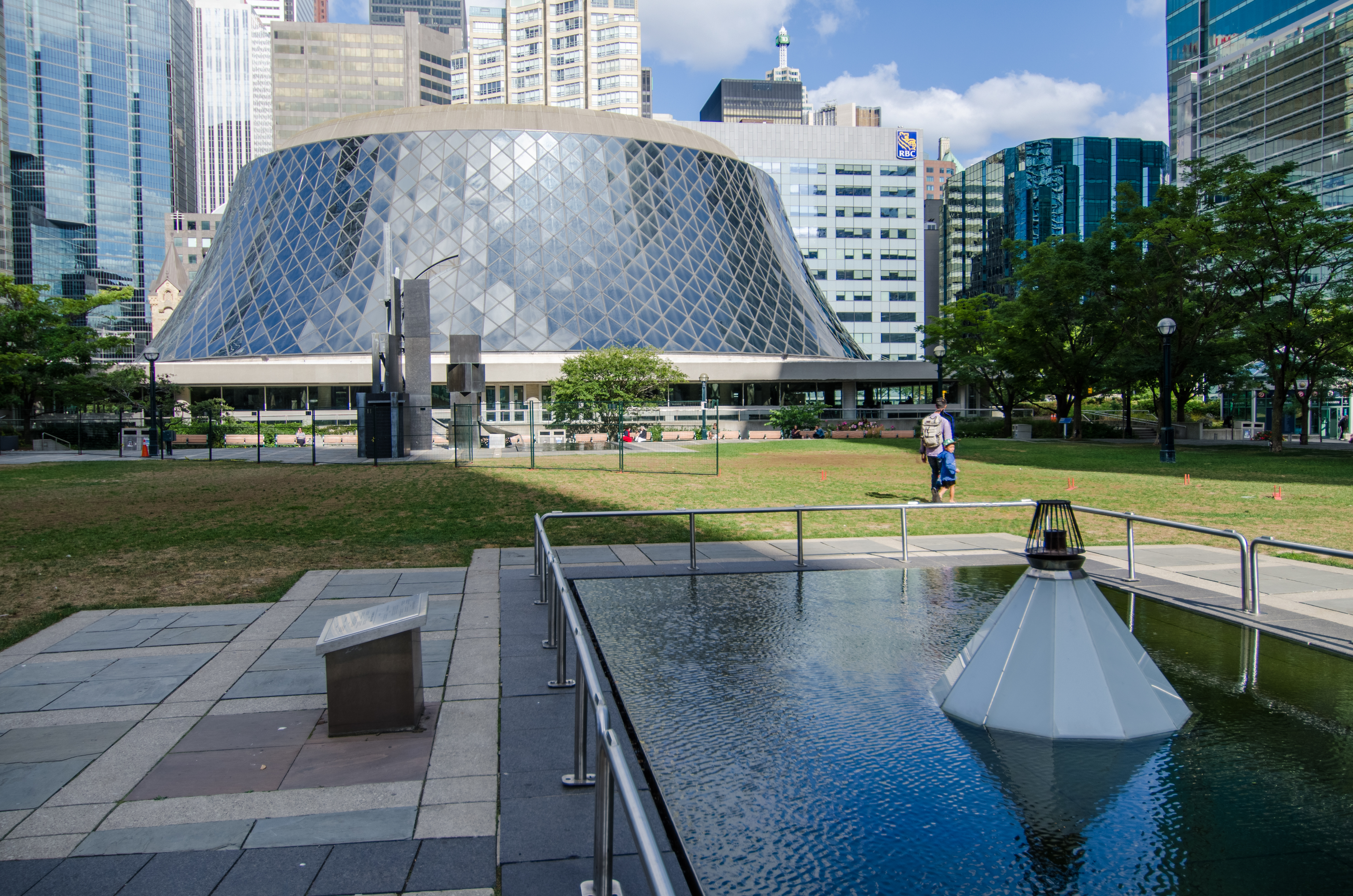
David Pecaut Square overlooking Roy Thomson Hall in Downtown Toronto hosted this season's Starting Line.

On November 22, 2018, CTV announced that a seventh season of The Amazing Race Canada was set to air in the summer of 2019. Similar to the previous season, the show broadcast the start of filming on its social media pages on April 23, 2019, with SportsCentre anchor Kayla Grey interviewing host Jon Montgomery and revealing the "Canada's Choice" returning team. The show also posted clips during filming to their social media pages that offered hints about the locations visited by the season as part of the "Jon on the Road: Presented by Chevrolet" series.

After leaving Toronto, teams went to Kamloops, British Columbia. Teams were spotted in Revelstoke, British Columbia on April 26, 2019. The show travelled to Yellowknife, Northwest Territories on April 29. The racers were in Thunder Bay, Ontario before finishing at Kakabeka Falls on May 13. Filming concluded in Muskoka on May 18.

This season was the first season not to feature a U-Turn board, but also introduced a variation called the Double One Way, which allowed teams to force others to complete one specific side of the Detour.

For the first time since season 1, the season's racecourse stayed entirely within Canada.

The finale was dedicated in memory of season 5 contestant Kenneth McAlpine who died in a hiking accident on Mount Gimli in the West Kootenay region of British Columbia on August 26, 2019, at the age of 28. A picture of McAlpine and a memorial message was aired during the broadcast of the finale.

=== Casting ===
Casting for the seventh season began on November 22, 2018. During a Facebook Live event on December 17, 2018, about casting for the new season, producer Mark Lysakowski commented that they were "looking for people that want to share a story that is a new lease on life. Or a second chance if you will." Initial casting ended on January 2, 2019.

=== Marketing ===
Chevrolet returned as a sponsor for the show and was the sole sponsor of the "Jon on the Road" videos. Dempster's Bakery also retained their sponsorship from the previous season. New sponsors this season included Clif Bar, Dairy Farmers of Canada, Disney's The Lion King, Expedia, Paramount's Dora and the Lost City of Gold, Royal Ontario Museum, Shell Canada's V-Power fuel, The Source and Webber Naturals.

After each episode, CTV posted a video online as part of a weekly series called "Tastes of the Race", which featured season 6 racers Martina & Phil facing off in a cooking competition inspired by this season's locations while using Dempster's products.

== Canada's Choice ==
On March 21, 2019, the show announced on its social media pages that fans would be able to vote for one of three previous teams to return for a second chance. Voting closed on April 1, 2019. The three teams were:

- Jet & Dave (from season 1)
- Brent & Sean (from season 3)
- Frankie & Amy (from season 4)

Jet & Dave were revealed as the winners of the vote on a live stream at the starting line.

== Cast ==
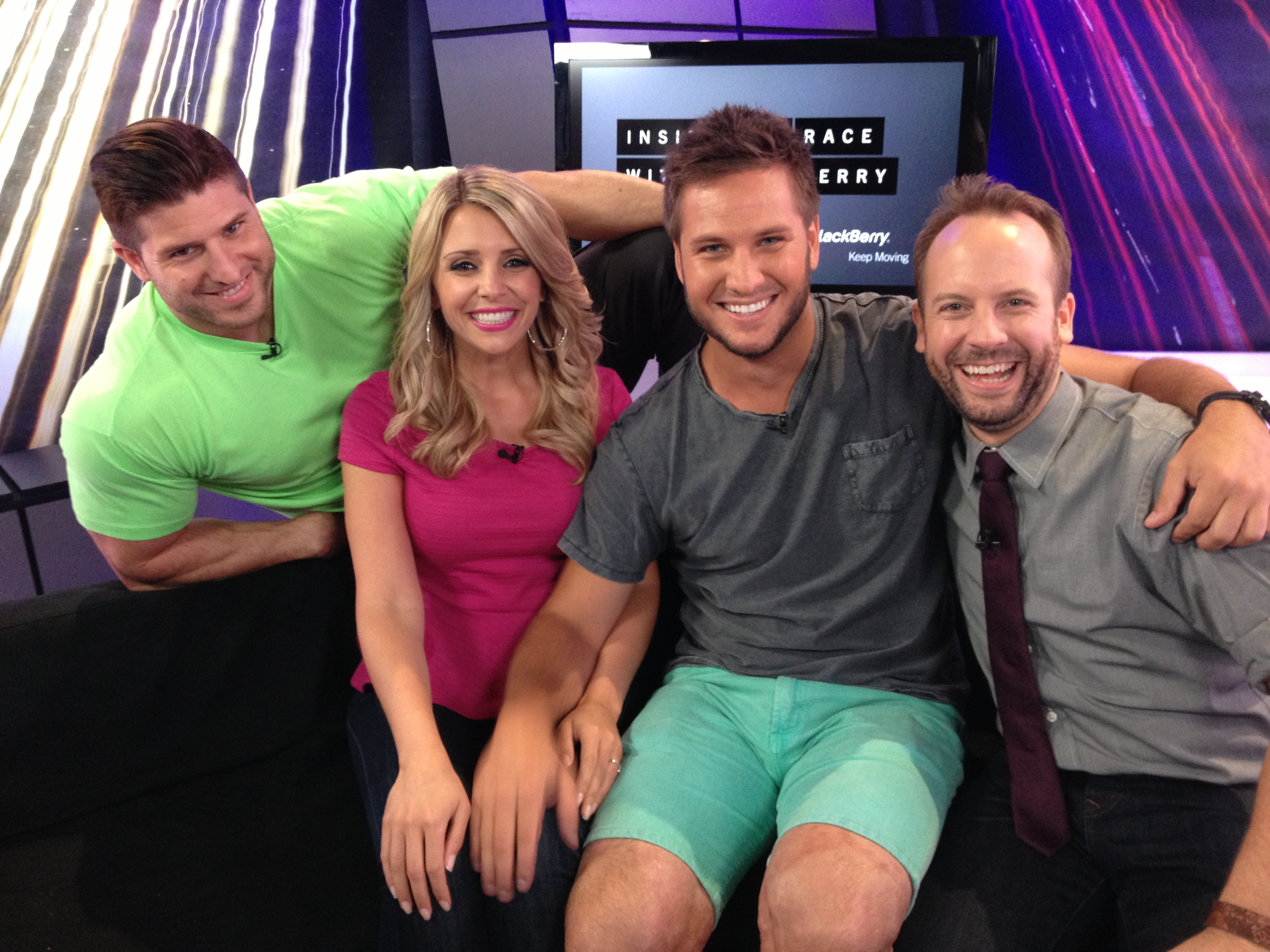
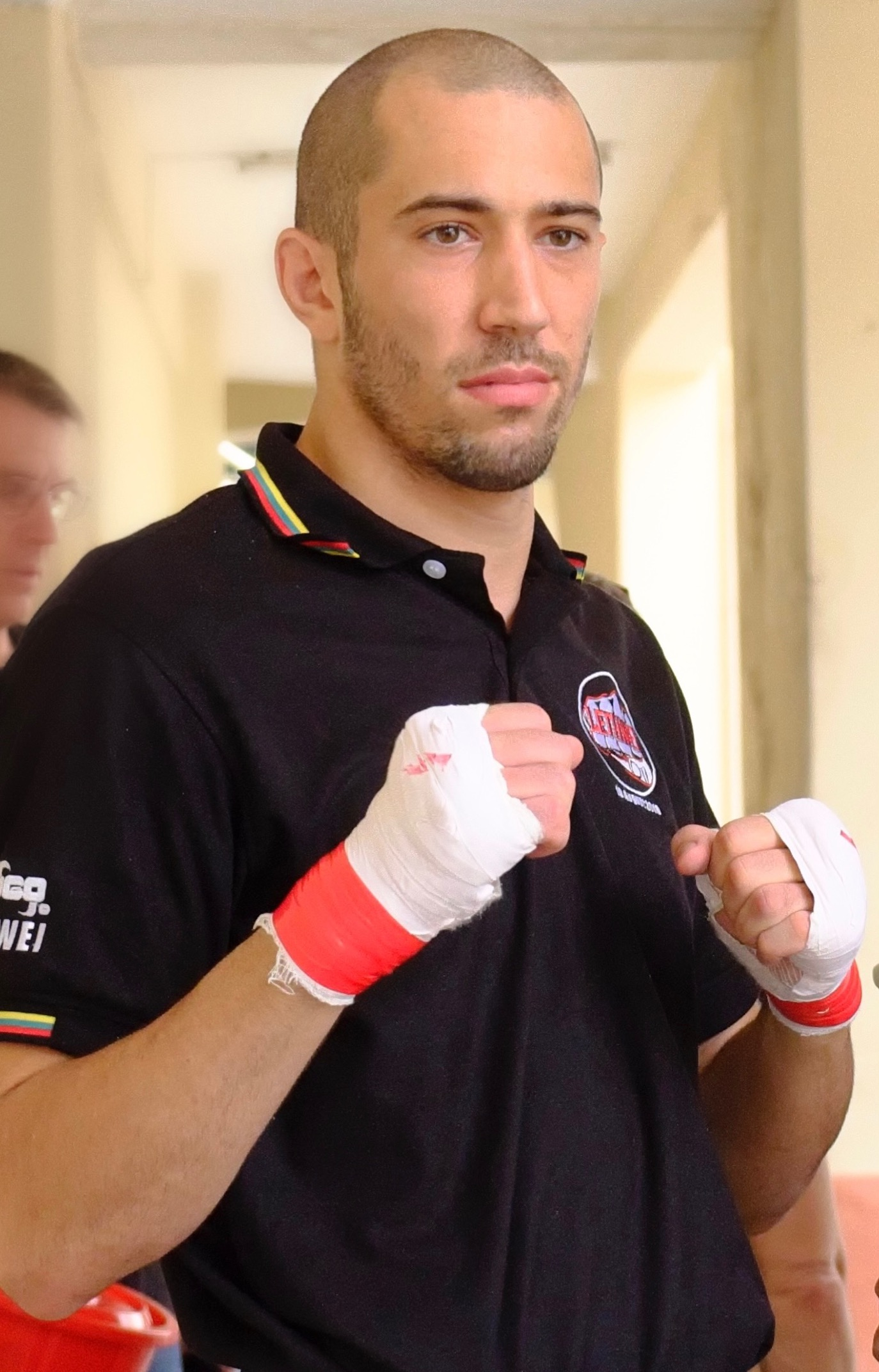
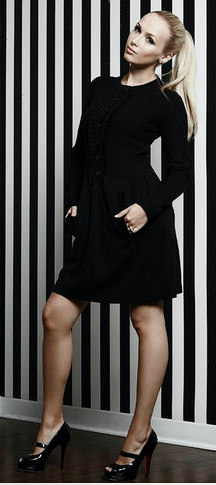
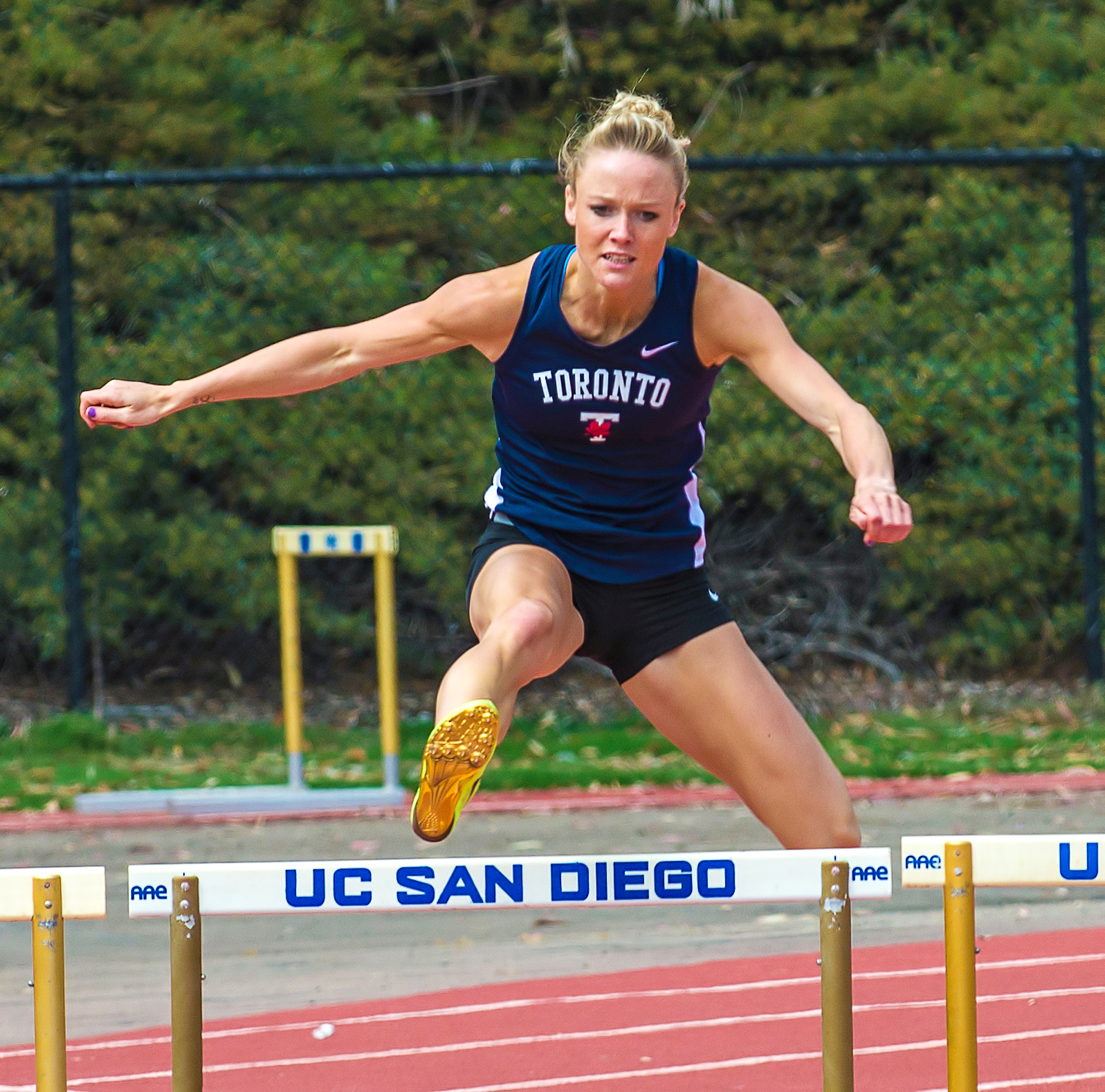
From left to right: Jet Black (left), Dave Schram (second from the right), Dave Leduc, Irina Terehova, and Sarah Wells

Between June 11 to June 13, one team a day were revealed on each of the CTV network shows Your Morning, The Marilyn Denis Show, and The Social. This season's cast included Lethwei World Champion Dave Leduc; writer, actress, and model Irina Terehova; Olympic hurdler Sarah Wells; sprinter Sam Effah; and noted two-spirit Indigenous doctor James Makokis.

Contestants	Age	Relationship	Hometown	Status
Jet Black	38	Best Friends; The Amazing Race Canada 1	London, Ontario	Eliminated 1st (in Kamloops, British Columbia)
Dave Schram	34	Best Friends; The Amazing Race Canada 1	London, Ontario	Eliminated 1st (in Kamloops, British Columbia)
Nicki Lee	31	Friends	Toronto, Ontario	Eliminated 2nd (in Revelstoke, British Columbia)
Aisha Bentham	31	Friends	Toronto, Ontario	Eliminated 2nd (in Revelstoke, British Columbia)
Gilles Miron	65	Grandfather & Grandson	Sunderland, Ontario	Eliminated 3rd (in Spruce Grove, Alberta)
Sean Miron	20	Grandfather & Grandson	Sunderland, Ontario	Eliminated 3rd (in Spruce Grove, Alberta)
Meaghan Wright	25	Twins	Halifax, Nova Scotia	Eliminated 4th (in Coombs, British Columbia)
Marie Wright	25	Twins	Halifax, Nova Scotia	Eliminated 4th (in Coombs, British Columbia)
Trish Omeri	45	Friends & Stay-at-Home Moms	Etobicoke, Ontario	Eliminated 5th (in Waterloo, Ontario)
Amy De Domenico	50	Friends & Stay-at-Home Moms	Etobicoke, Ontario	Eliminated 5th (in Waterloo, Ontario)
Aarthy Ketheeswaran	25	Dating	Vancouver, British Columbia	Eliminated 6th (in Oliver Paipoonge, Ontario)
Thinesh Kumarakulasingam	28	Dating	Vancouver, British Columbia	Eliminated 6th (in Oliver Paipoonge, Ontario)
Dave Leduc	27	Married	Gatineau, Quebec	Eliminated 7th (in Gaspereau, Nova Scotia)
Irina Terehova	29	Married	Montreal, Quebec	Eliminated 7th (in Gaspereau, Nova Scotia)
Lauren Lavoie	27	Sisters	Regina, Saskatchewan	Third place
Joanne Lavoie	21	Sisters	Regina, Saskatchewan	Third place
Sarah Wells	29	Track Teammates	Toronto, Ontario	Runners-up
Sam Effah	30	Track Teammates	Toronto, Ontario	Runners-up
Anthony Johnson	33	Married	Edmonton, Alberta	Winners
James Makokis	37	Married	Edmonton, Alberta	Winners

== Results ==
The following teams are listed with their placements in each leg. Placements are listed in finishing order.

- A red placement with a dagger (†) indicates that the team was eliminated.
- An underlined blue placement with a double-dagger (‡) indicates that the team was the last to arrive at a Pit Stop in a non-elimination leg, and had to perform a Speed Bump task in the following leg.
- An italicized and underlined placement indicates that the team was the last to arrive at a Pit Stop, but there was no rest period at the Pit Stop and all teams were instructed to continue racing.
- A purple ε indicates that the team used an Express Pass on that leg to bypass one of their tasks.
- A brown ⇒ indicates that the team used the One Way and a brown ⇐ indicates the team on the receiving end of the One Way.
- A teal х indicates that the leg featured a Face Off challenge.

Team placement (by leg)
Team	1	2	3	4	5	6	7x (Note: This leg featured a Face Off challenge.)	8	9x	10	11
Anthony & James	6th	6th	3rd	6thɛ (Note: This team used their Express Pass to bypass one of the tasks on this leg.)	2nd (Note: Aarthy & Thinesh and Anthony & James tied for 2nd place tie after both teams stepped on the Pit Stop mat at the same time.)	1st	2nd	5th (Note: This team arrived last at the Pit Stop, but they were instructed to continue racing.)	3rd	1st	1st
Sarah & Sam	2nd	4th	5th⇒ (Note: Sarah & Sam chose to use the One Way on Gilles & Sean.)	4th	1st	2nd	4th	4th	2nd	2nd	2nd
Lauren & Joanne	4th	8th	4th⇒ (Note: Lauren & Joanne chose to use the One Way on Trish & Amy.)	5th	6th (Note: Lauren & Joanne initially arrived 4th, but were issued a 2-hour penalty for failing to complete the clam digging challenge. Two teams checked in during this penalty time, dropping Lauren & Joanne to 6th.)	4th	5th	2nd	4th	3rd	3rd
Dave & Irina	1st	2nd	1st	3rdε (Note: Dave & Irina initially arrived 1st, but were issued a 2-hour penalty for quitting the latitude and longitude task. Two teams checked in during this penalty time, dropping Dave & Irina to 3rd.)	5th (Note: Dave & Irina initially arrived 3rd, but were issued a 2-hour penalty for failing to complete the clam digging challenge. Two teams checked in during this penalty time, dropping Dave & Irina to 5th.)	3rd	1st	3rd	1st	4th†	
Aarthy & Thinesh	7th	1st	2nd	1st	2nd	5th	3rd	1st	5th†		
Trish & Amy	5th	7th	7th⇐	7th‡	4th (Note: Trish & Amy initially arrived 1st, but were issued a 2-hour penalty for failing to complete the clam digging challenge. Three teams checked in during this penalty time, dropping Trish & Amy to 4th.)	6th‡	6th†				
Meaghan & Marie	3rd	5th	6th	2nd	7th†						
Gilles & Sean	9th	3rd	8th†⇐								
Nicki & Aisha	8th	9th†									
Jet & Dave	10th†										

== Race summary ==
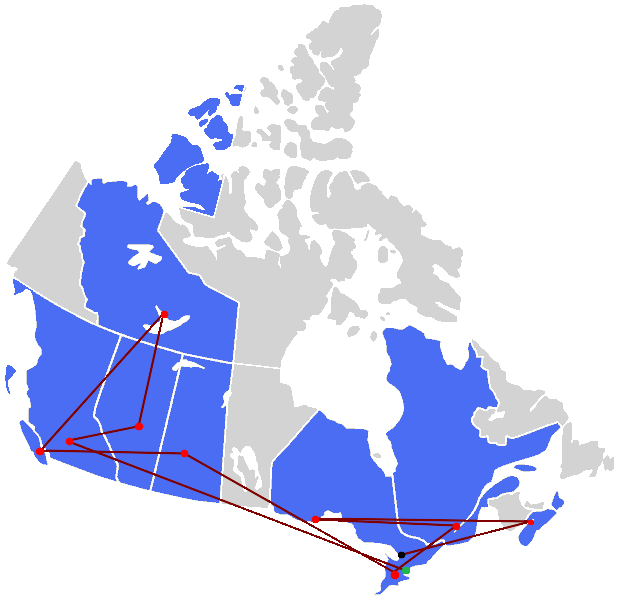
Route for The Amazing Race Canada 7.

Destinations	Air travel Rail travel Water travel Bus travel Helicopter travel Bicycle travel Gondola travel
Route Markers	Detour Roadblock One Way Face Off Speed Bump Pit Stop

=== Leg 1 (Ontario → British Columbia) ===
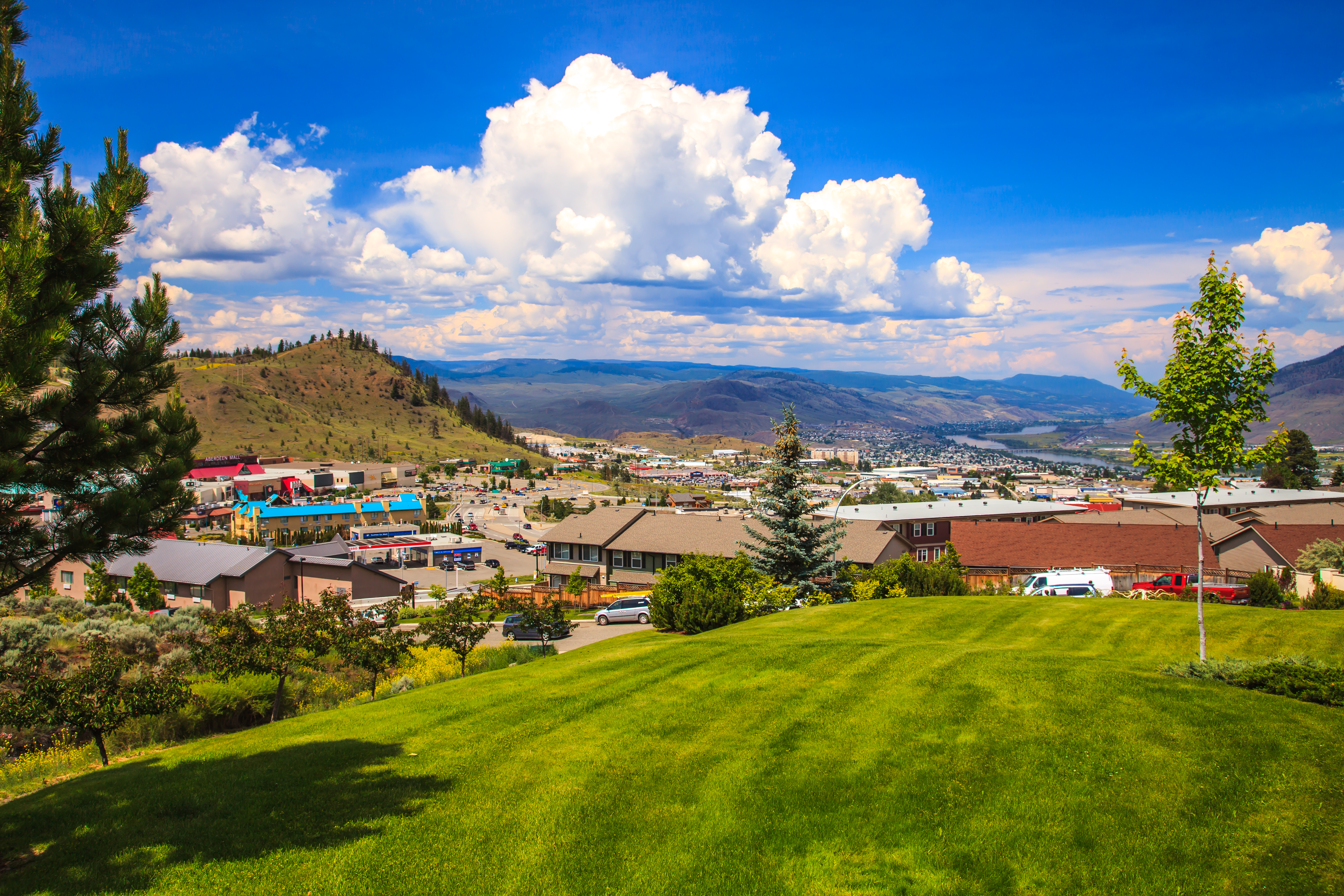
The first leg of this season visited the city of Kamloops in British Columbia.

- Episode 1: "Canada Get More Maps" (July 2, 2019)
- Prizes: A trip for two to Cape Town, South Africa, and two Express Passes (awarded to Dave & Irina)
- Eliminated: Jet & Dave

Locations

- Toronto, Ontario (David Pecaut Square) (Starting Line)
- Toronto (Extreme Reach Recording Studio)
- Toronto (Ontario Food Terminal)
- Toronto → Kamloops, British Columbia (Kamloops Airport)
- Kamloops (Ajax Mine)
- Kamloops (Circle Creek Ranch)
- Kamloops (Kamloops Bike Ranch)

Episode summary

- From David Pecaut Square, teams were instructed to find their next clue at Extreme Reach Recording Studio.
- In this season's first Roadblock, one team member had to rehearse a voiceover script for the trailer of Disney's The Lion King remake. They then had to enter an isolation booth and record their voice in sync with the trailer in order to receive their next clue.
- In this leg's second Roadblock, the team member who did not perform the previous Roadblock had to ride a 1,000-foot (300 m) zipline while suspended 100 feet (30 m) above the waters of an abandoned open-pit burrow of the Ajax Mine and had to successfully toss a yellow ball into a floating target during their ride in order to receive their next clue.
- After the first Roadblock, teams had to search the vast cold storage rooms of the Ontario Food Terminal for two halves of a postcard that revealed their next destination: Kamloops, British Columbia. Once there, teams had to search the airport parking lot for a marked vehicle, which contained their next clue.
- After the second Roadblock, teams had to search through a herd of thirty yearlings at the Circle Creek Ranch until they could find their next destination printed on the ear tag on one of the cows in order to receive their next clue, which directed them to the Pit Stop: the Kamloops bike ranch.

=== Leg 2 (British Columbia) ===
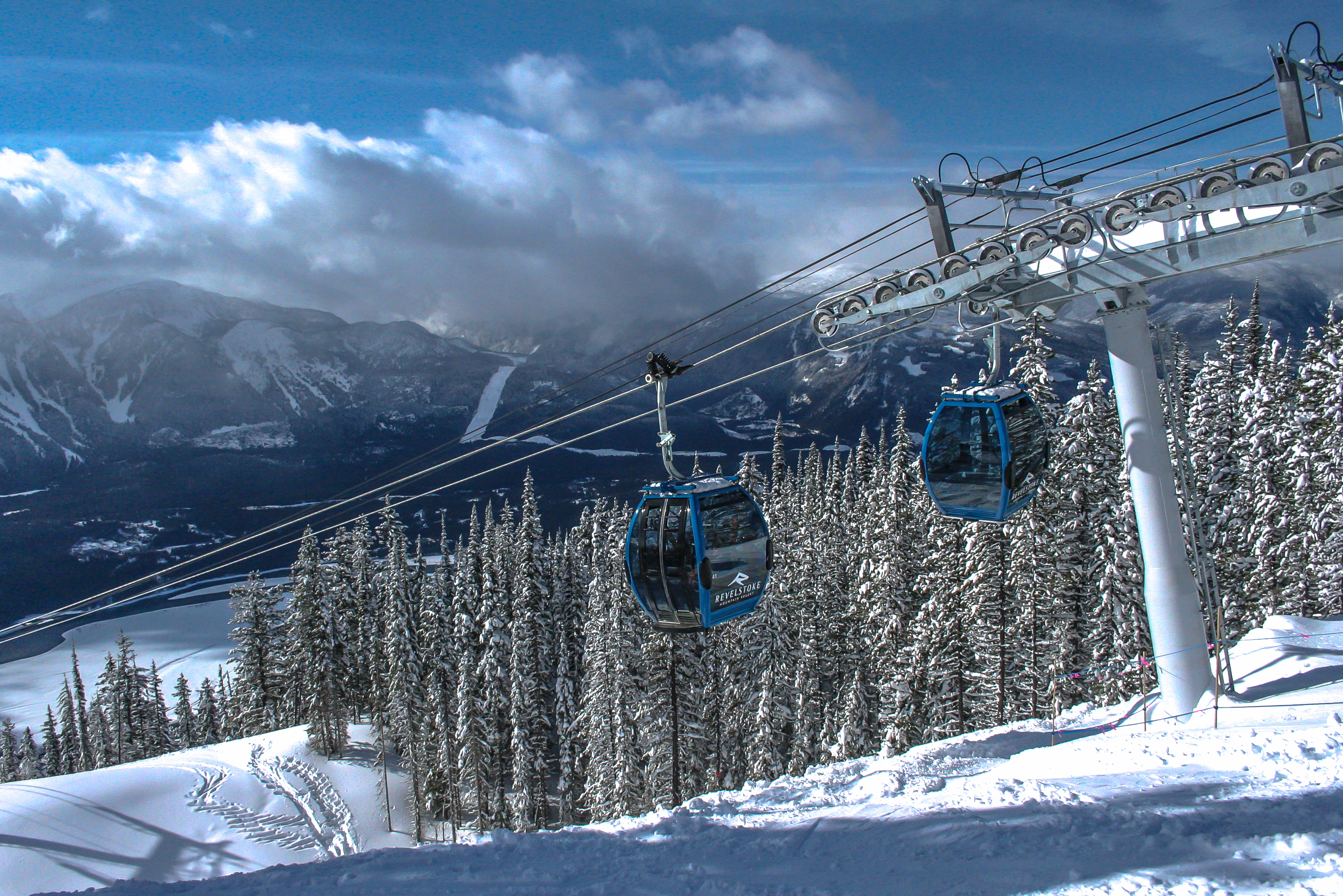
Teams ended the leg in Revelstoke by traveling via cable car to the top of Mount Mackenzie, known as North America's biggest vertical drop.

- Episode 2: "Our Competition's Not That Smart" (July 9, 2019)
- Prize: A trip for two to Madrid, Spain, and an Express Pass (awarded to Aarthy & Thinesh)
- Eliminated: Nicki & Aisha

Locations

- Kamloops (Riverside Park)
- Craigellachie (Last Spike Monument)
- Revelstoke (Glacier House Resort)
- Revelstoke (BC Interior Forestry Museum & Forest Discovery Centre or Williamson Lake Campground)
- Revelstoke (Revelstoke Railway Museum)
- Revelstoke (Revelstoke Mountain Resort → Mount Mackenzie)

Episode summary

- At the start of this leg, teams were instructed to drive to the Last Spike Monument in Craigellachie in order to find their next clue.
- In this leg's Roadblock, one team member had to suit up and ride a dirt bike, completing one lap around a course of hills and banked turns, in under one minute and fifty seconds in order to receive their next clue.
- This season's first Detour was a choice between Plant or Paddle. In Plant, teams had to plant forty conifer tree seedlings in a forest clearing, ensuring that the seedlings were straight, planted a specified length apart, and had no air pockets underground in order to receive their next clue. In Paddle, teams had to paddle a pair of kayaks, tied together facing opposite directions, to collect five differently coloured flags from buoys scattered around the lake that they could exchange for their next clue.
- After the Detour, teams had to construct and then operate a model railroad set on a table at the Revelstoke Railway Museum. They had to use every given piece of track and all of the accessories, and the track layout had to fit on the table with no dead ends. Once their train completed a full circuit, teams received their next clue, which instructed them to drive to the Revelstoke Mountain Resort, ride the cable car to the top of Mount Mackenzie, and then search for the Pit Stop.

=== Leg 3 (British Columbia → Alberta) ===
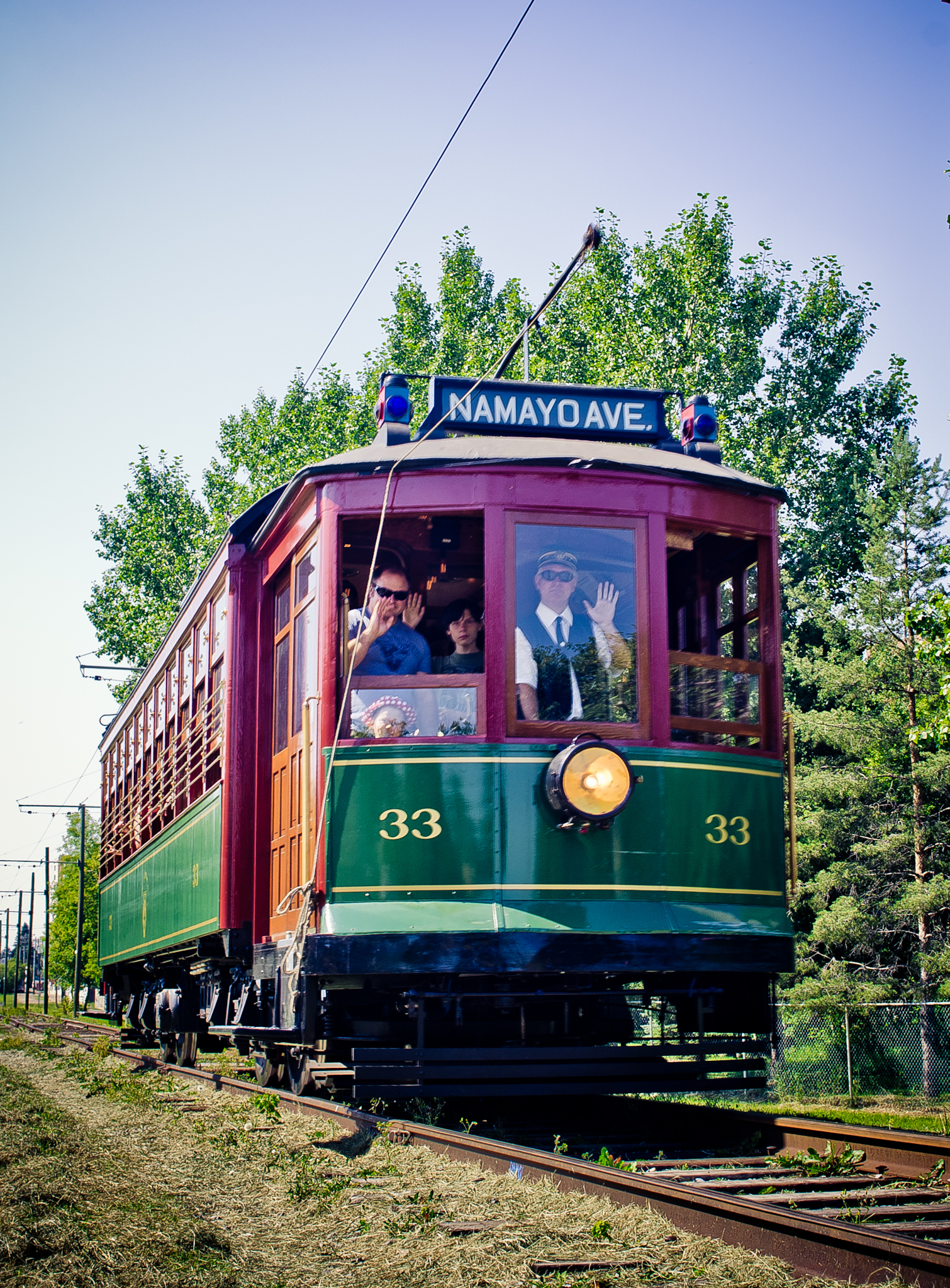
On the High Level Bridge Streetcar in Edmonton, teams encountered a new twist: the Double One Way.

- Episode 3: "We'll Let the Peasants Fight for Last Place" (July 16, 2019)
- Prize: A trip for two to Casablanca, Morocco (awarded to Dave & Irina)
- Eliminated: Gilles & Sean

Locations

- Revelstoke (Mount Mackenzie)
- Kamloops (Kamloops Airport) → Edmonton, Alberta
- Edmonton (Southgate Centre – The Source)
- Edmonton (Garneau & Oliver – High Level Bridge Streetcar)
- Edmonton (Downtown Edmonton – Royal Alberta Museum or 100 Street Funicular)
- Edmonton (Strathcona – Old Strathcona Antique Mall)
- Spruce Grove (University of Alberta Botanic Garden – Kurimoto Japanese Garden)
- Spruce Grove (University of Alberta Botanic Garden – Aga Khan Garden)

Episode summary

- At the start of this leg, teams were instructed to fly to Edmonton, Alberta. At the Kamloops Airport, teams had to sign up for one of two flights to Edmonton, the first of which carried two teams and landed 2:30 hours before the second flight that carried six teams. Once there, teams had to travel to The Source at Southgate Centre. There, teams were given smartwatches that they had to wear throughout the leg, and the team that had the fewest steps recorded by the end of the leg would win a CA$5,000 gift card from The Source. Lauren & Joanne won this prize. Teams found their next clue on the High Level Bridge Streetcar.
- This leg's Detour was a choice between Celebrate or Elevate. In Celebrate, teams had to learn the lyrics and choreography for a medley of South African songs and then successfully perform them with the Kokopelli Youth Choir in order to receive their next clue. In Elevate, teams had to complete two puzzles of the Edmonton skyline, one at the top of the funicular and one at the bottom, in order to receive their next clue from Knowmadic, the city's poet laureate. Teams discovered that some puzzle pieces belonged to the other puzzle and had to transfer them one at a time via the funicular.
- After the Detour, teams had to search the Old Strathcona Antique Mall for "Jon" and had to figure out that they were looking for a Jon Montgomery bobblehead, which they could exchange for their next clue directing them to the Kurimoto Japanese Garden.
- In this leg's Roadblock, one team member had to watch a silent demonstration of an Ikebana flower arrangement and had to replicate the arrangement in order to receive their next clue directing them to the Pit Stop: the Aga Khan Garden.

Additional note

- This leg featured a Blind Double One Way. Lauren & Joanne chose to use the One Way on Trish & Amy and sent them to Celebrate, while Sarah & Sam chose to use the One Way on Gilles & Sean and also sent them to Celebrate.

=== Leg 4 (Alberta → Northwest Territories) ===
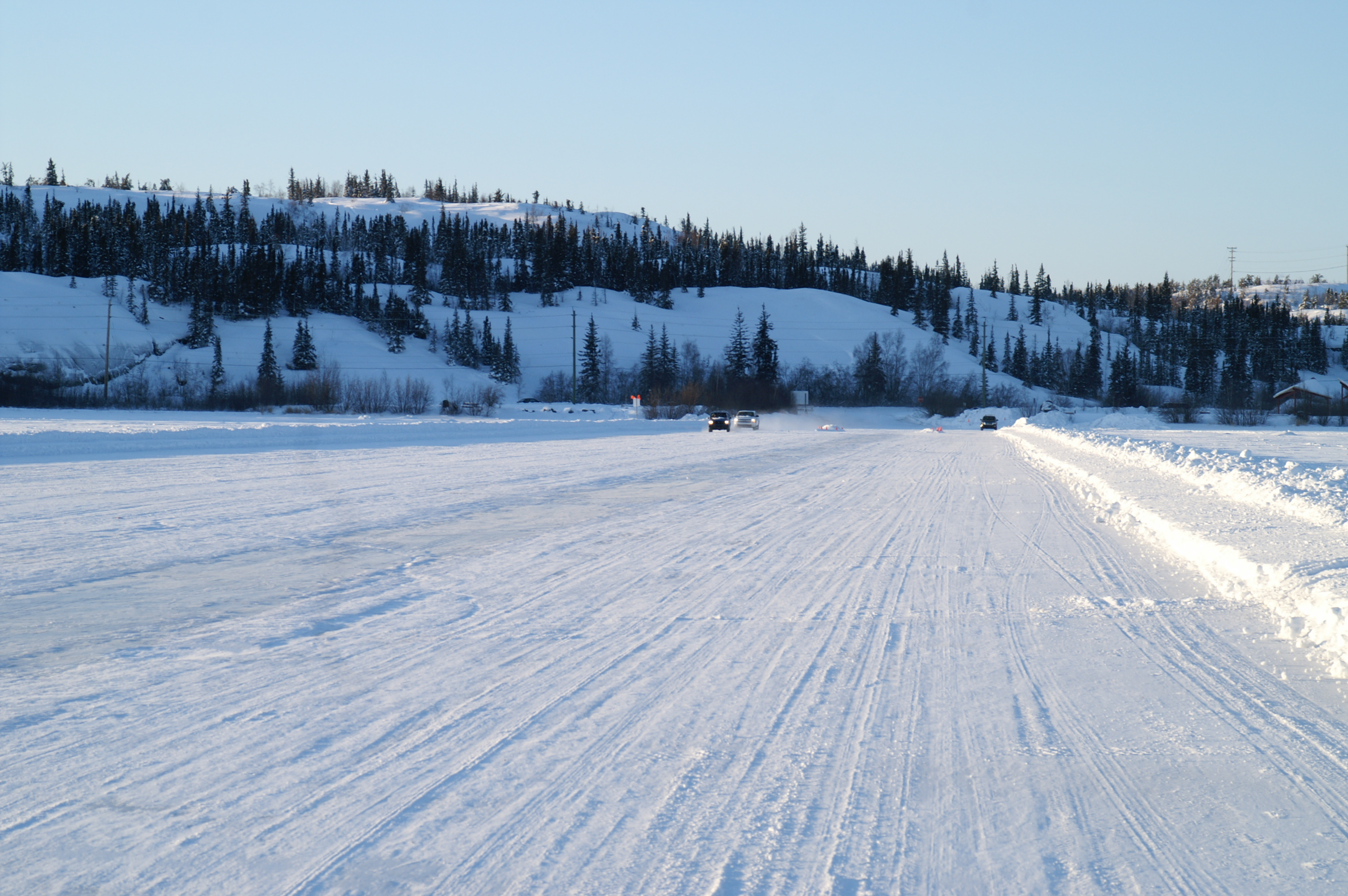
The Dene First Nation community of Dettah, overlooking the Great Slave Lake in Northwest Territories, hosted the fourth Pit Stop of the race.

- Episode 4: "I Love Geologists" (July 23, 2019)
- Prize: A trip for two to Dublin, Ireland (awarded to Aarthy & Thinesh)

Locations

- Edmonton (100 Street Funicular)
- Edmonton → Yellowknife, Northwest Territories
- Yellowknife (Somba K'e Civic Plaza)
- Yellowknife (Rotary Park)
- Yellowknife (Great Slave Lake – Fishing Camp)
- Yellowknife (NWT Diamond Centre)
- Yellowknife (Great Slave Lake – Robertson Drive Dock)
- Yellowknife (Air Tindi Float Base) → Dettah

Episode summary

- At the start of this leg, teams were instructed to fly to Yellowknife, Northwest Territories. There, teams had to search for the United in Celebration sculpture at Somba K'e Civic Plaza in order to find their next clue. Teams then had to drive a snowmobile from Rotary Park across Great Slave Lake to a fishing camp. There, teams had to drill a hole through three feet (0.91 m) of ice for ice fishing using a handheld auger, and then clear the hole of ice chips so they could drop a Dene fishing line in order to receive their next clue.
- In this leg's first Roadblock, one team member had to use a jeweler's loupe to identify which six out of seven diamonds were marked with a Canadian symbol, a maple leaf. They then had to use a Forevermark viewer to find the identification number on each diamond. Finally, they had to sort the diamonds from heaviest to lightest in order to receive their next clue. Anthony & James used their Express Pass to bypass this Roadblock.
- After the first Roadblock teams found their next clue at the Robertson Drive Dock.
- In this leg's second Roadblock, the team member who did not perform the previous Roadblock had to don a wetsuit and safety gear, dive into a hole in Great Slave Lake, and swim under the ice to an exit hole in order to retrieve their next clue. Dave & Irina used their Express Pass to bypass this Roadblock.
- After the second Roadblock, teams had to travel to the Air Tindi Float Base, choose a station with four navigational maps, and identify ten rescue sites using latitude and longitude coordinates in order to receive their next clue, which instructed them to board a ski plane that took them to the Pit Stop: the town of Dettah.

Additional note

- This was a non-elimination leg.

=== Leg 5 (Northwest Territories → British Columbia) ===
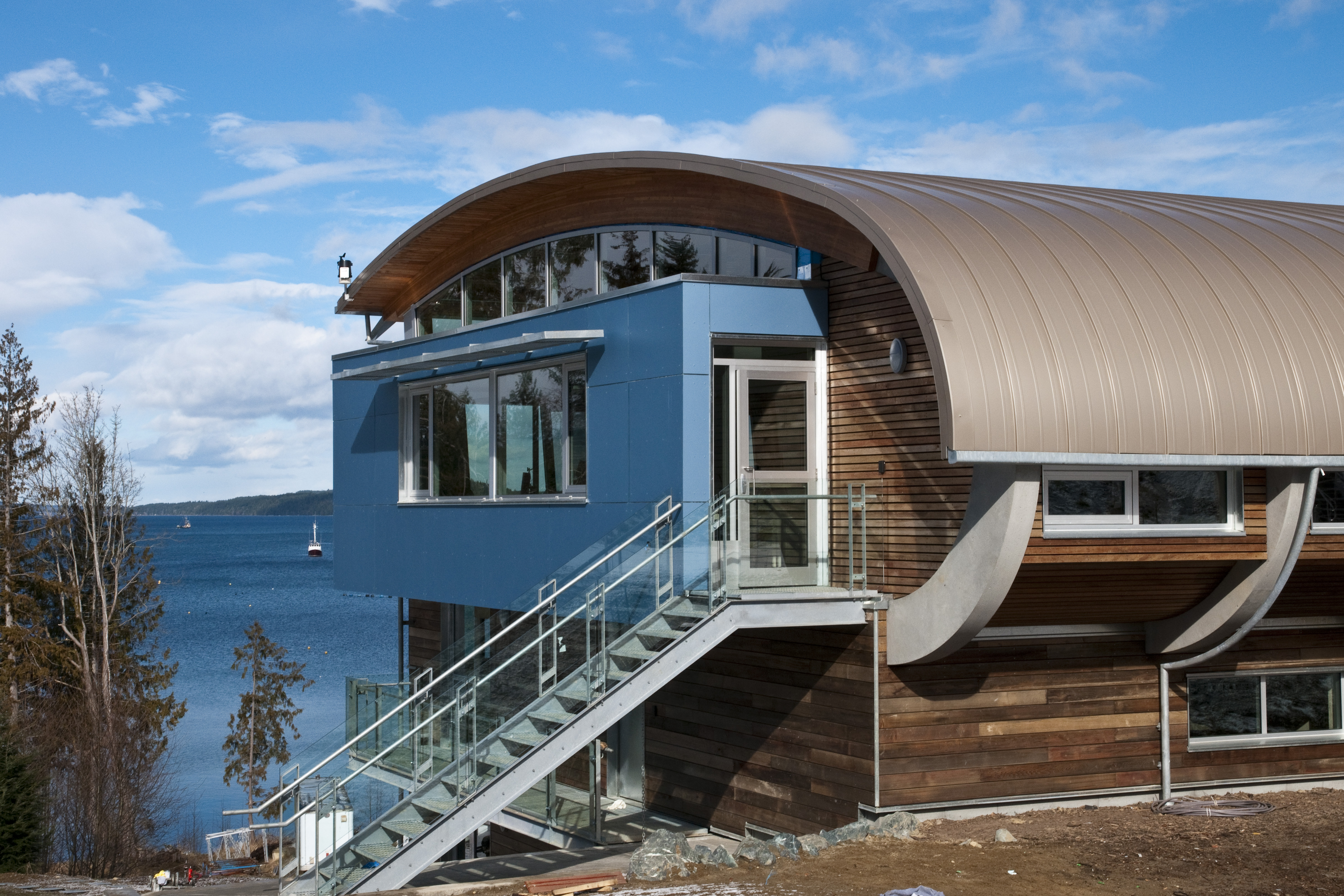
Teams took part in clam digging at the Deep Bay Marine Field Station during their visit to Deep Bay, British Columbia.

- Episode 5: "Clamageddon Continues" (July 30, 2019)
- Prize: A trip for two to Machu Picchu, Peru (awarded to Sarah & Sam)
- Eliminated: Meaghan & Marie

Locations

- Yellowknife (Prince of Wales Northern Heritage Centre)
- Yellowknife → Vancouver, British Columbia
- Vancouver (Vancouver Harbour Air Terminal) → Nanaimo, Vancouver Island
- Nanaimo (Petroglyph Provincial Park)
- Nanaimo (WildPlay Element Parks – Nanaimo River Gorge)
- Deep Bay (Deep Bay Marine Field Station)
- Horne Lake Caves Provincial Park (Horne Lake Caves)
- Coombs (Old Country Market – Goats on Roof)

Episode summary

- At the start of this leg, teams were instructed to fly to Vancouver, British Columbia. Once there, teams had to travel to the Vancouver Harbour Air Terminal, where they had to sign up for one of four seaplanes flying to Nanaimo on Vancouver Island, the first of which carried one team with the remaining planes carrying two teams each. Once on Vancouver Island, teams had to drive to Petroglyph Provincial Park and search for Dora the Explorer-themed backpacks, along with various items they would need during the leg, as well as tablets containing a video clue from Isabela Moner, the actress who played Dora in Dora and the Lost City of Gold. Teams then found their next clue in their backpacks and had to pack all of their items before leaving the park. Teams the drove to WildPlay Element Parks and had 60 seconds to memorize a Nanaimo bar recipe before one team member bungee jumped off of a 150-foot (46 m) high bridge down the Nanaimo River Gorge while their partner rode a tandem primal swing off of the same bridge. If they could correctly recite the ingredients afterward, they received their next clue, which directed them to the Deep Bay Marine Field Station.
- For their Speed Bump, Trish & Amy had to correctly assemble a 37-piece model orca skeleton using all of the pieces provided, including a tooth inside their Dora backpack, before they could continue racing.
- Once at Deep Bay Marine Field Station, teams had to dig for and correctly identify thirty Manila clams, thirty mahogany clams, thirty Pacific oysters, and five butter clams in order to receive their next clue.
- In this leg's Roadblock, one team member had to pick up a box from The Source containing a smartphone, which they had to use to photograph eleven letters hidden within Horne Lake Caves. Racers then had to use a marker and whiteboard to unscramble and then spell the name of the Pit Stop: Goats on Roof. When racers believed that they had the correct answer, they had to take a photograph of their whiteboard and present it the photo to the park director, who either confirmed or denied their answer. Racers who figured out that the bunch of carrots in their backpack were a clue could write the answer on their whiteboard without spelunking.
- After the Roadblock, teams had to check in at the Pit Stop: the Old Country Market in Coombs.

=== Leg 6 (British Columbia → Saskatchewan) ===
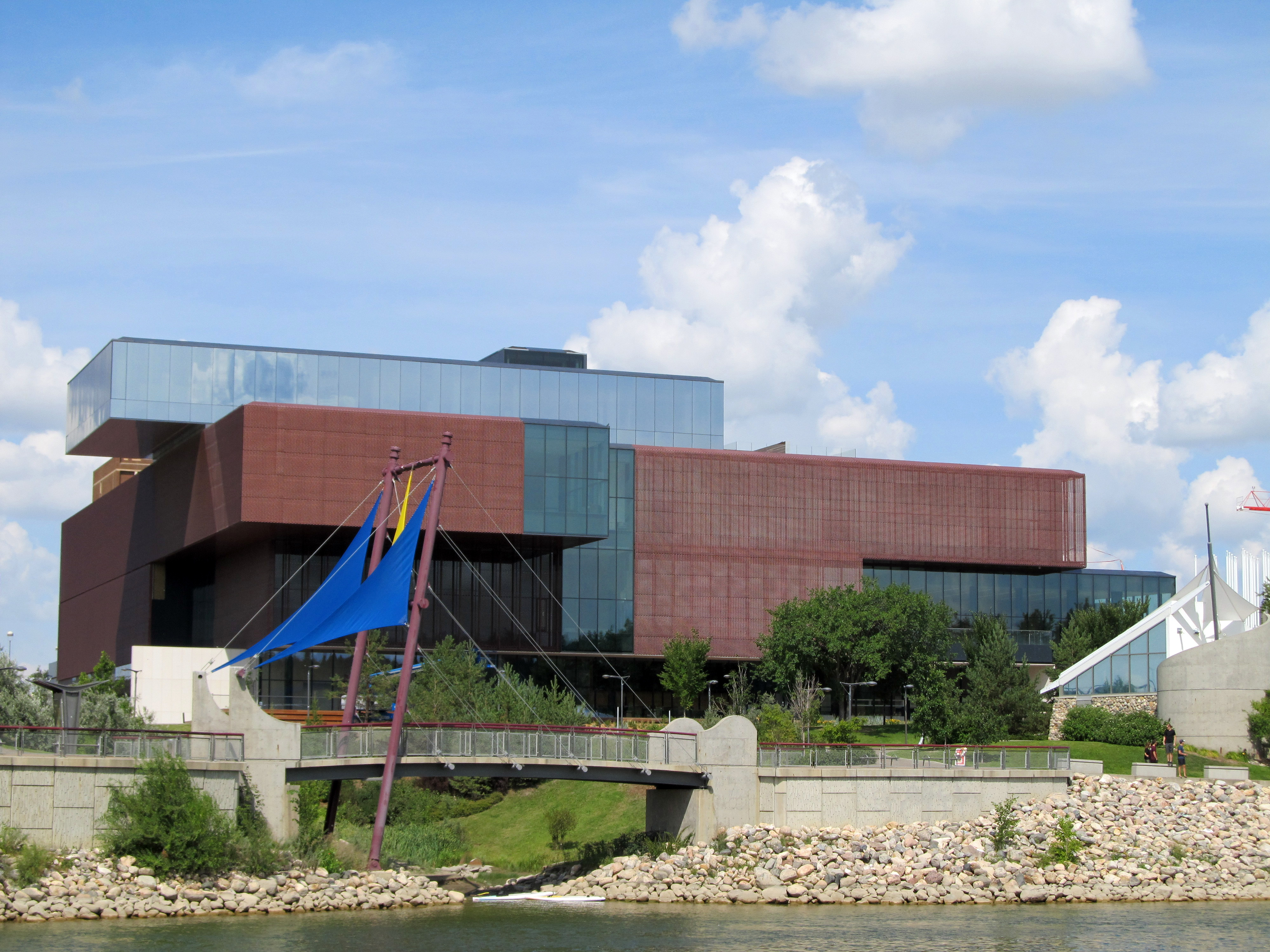
Teams ended the leg in Saskatoon at the Remai Modern Art Museum overlooking the South Saskatchewan River.

- Episode 6: "I'm a Little Muskrat on a Mission" (August 6, 2019)
- Prizes: A trip for two to Costa Rica, plus a year's supply of free gas (awarded to Anthony & James)

Locations

- Nanaimo (Nanaimo Harbour)
- Nanaimo → Saskatoon, Saskatchewan
- Saskatoon (University of Saskatchewan – Canadian Light Source)
- RM of Corman Park (Nutrien Cory Potash Mine)
- Saskatoon (Shell Gas Station)
- St. Denis (Champêtre County Vacation Ranch)
- Saskatoon (Victoria Park)
- Saskatoon (Remai Modern Art Museum)

Episode summary

- At the start of this leg, teams were instructed to fly to Saskatoon, Saskatchewan. Teams found their next clue at the Canadian Light Source and were sent to the Cory potash mine. There, teams descended one kilometre (0.62 mi) into the mine and had to nail a ventilation curtain to a mine shaft ceiling in a straight line with no gaps. They then had to pile loose potash along the bottom of the curtain to maintain a seal before receiving their next clue. Teams then had to drive to a Shell gas station and received a video message on a tablet from their loved ones, who informed them of their next destination: the Champêtre County Vacation Ranch in St. Denis.
- This leg's Detour was a choice between Dance in a Square or Walk in Circles. In Dance in a Square, one team member had to memorize a list of nineteen square dance moves and call the dance in time with the music while their partner had to perform the dance alongside the River City Squares in order to receive their next clue. In Walk in Circles, teams had to search a 7,500-square-foot (700 m^{2}) barn board maze for four different types of corncobs, which they could exchange for their next clue.
- After the Detour, teams had to join a Saskatchewan Rush lacrosse practice at Victoria Park in Saskatoon. One team member had to pass a ball to their partner, who had to toss it at a goal and hit one of four targets. After hitting two targets, teams could receive their next clue, which directed them to the Pit Stop: the Remai Modern Art Museum.

Additional note

- Artist Amalie Atkins appeared as the Pit Stop greeter for this leg.
- This was a non-elimination leg.

=== Leg 7 (Saskatchewan → Ontario) ===
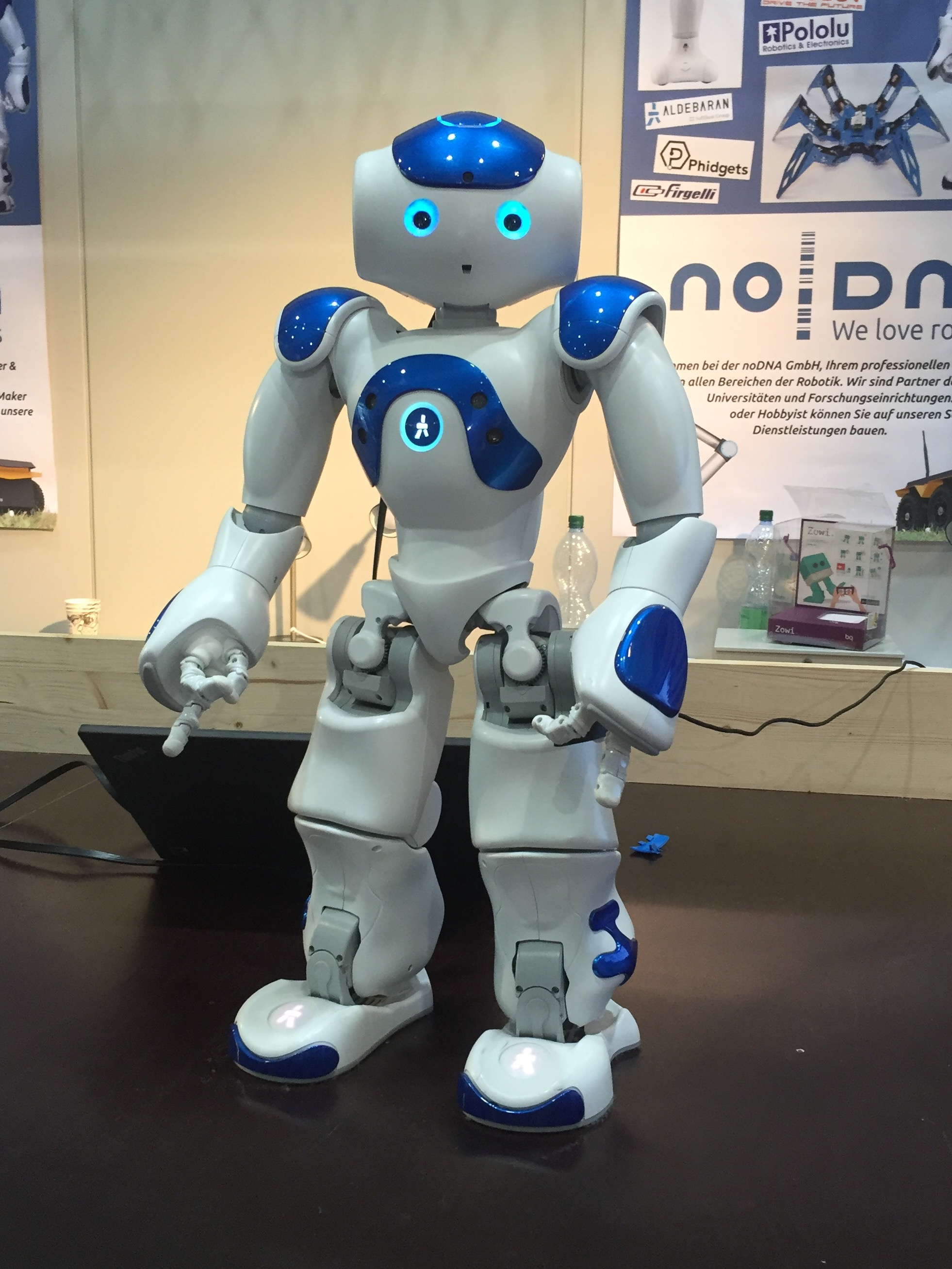
One side of the Detour in Kitchener–Waterloo required teams to navigate a Nao robot through a course.

- Episode 7: "Balls, Balls, Balls" (August 13, 2019)
- Prize: A trip for two to Frankfurt, Germany (awarded to Dave & Irina)
- Eliminated: Trish & Amy

Locations

- Saskatoon (Kiwanis Memorial Park – Vimy Memorial)
- Saskatoon → Toronto, Ontario
- Toronto (Delta Toronto Airport Hotel) → Kitchener (Charles Street Transit Terminal)
- Kitchener (TheMuseum)
- Waterloo (University of Waterloo – Sedra Student Design Centre)
- Kitchener (Concordia Club) or Waterloo (University of Waterloo – RoboHub)
- Kitchener (The Culinary Studio)
- Waterloo (Perimeter Institute for Theoretical Physics)
- Waterloo (Wilfrid Laurier University – Knight–Newbrough Field)

Episode summary

- At the start of this leg, teams were instructed to fly to Toronto, Ontario. In the lobby of the Delta Hotel, teams had to sign up for one of two buses to a mystery destination (Kitchener) which carried three teams each and departed ten minutes apart. The bus's windows were blacked out, so teams did not know their destination until they arrived. Teams found their next clue at the Charles Street Transit Terminal directing them to the SPECTRUM exhibition at TheMuseum. One team member at a time had to enter a ball pit filled with over 30,000 green plastic balls and find one of twelve red or yellow balls, which they could exchange for their next clue.
- For their Speed Bump, Trish & Amy had to drive to the University of Waterloo, where they met the designer of a self-driving car and completed a test drive around the campus before they could continue racing.
- This leg's Detour was a choice between Beer Fest or Robot Quest. In Beer Fest, teams would have taken part in a Kitchener–Waterloo Oktoberfest celebration. They would have had to choose a table of ten patrons, who each would have ordered a different variety of beer. Once they had served all ten orders correctly, teams would have received their next clue. In Robot Quest, teams had to use walkie-talkies to navigate a Nao robot through a course. One team member gave directions to their partner in another room, who blindly controlled the robot by entering the commands on a computer screen. Once Nao completed the course and crossed the finish line, they received their next clue from a TALOS humanoid robot. All teams chose to navigate robots through a maze.
- For this season's first Face Off, two teams took part in a culinary competition. The team who arrived first had the choice of three dishes to prepare using wheat tortillas: wraps, rolls, or pizza. Both teams were given one minute to observe the completed dish, and then had fifteen minutes to re-create the dish without the use of a recipe. The team whose dish better resembled the example received their next clue, while the losing team had to wait for another team. The last team remaining at the Face Off had to turn over an hourglass and wait out a time penalty before moving on.
- After the Face Off, teams had to solve an algebraic equation at the Perimeter Institute for Theoretical Physics. They had to drop a tennis ball from a balcony, and then use a stopwatch to measure the time it took to reach the ground. They had to determine on a chalkboard the distance from the balcony to the ground. If their solution was within a certain margin, they received their next clue, which directed them to the Pit Stop: the football stadium at Wilfrid Laurier University.

=== Leg 8 (Ontario → Quebec) ===
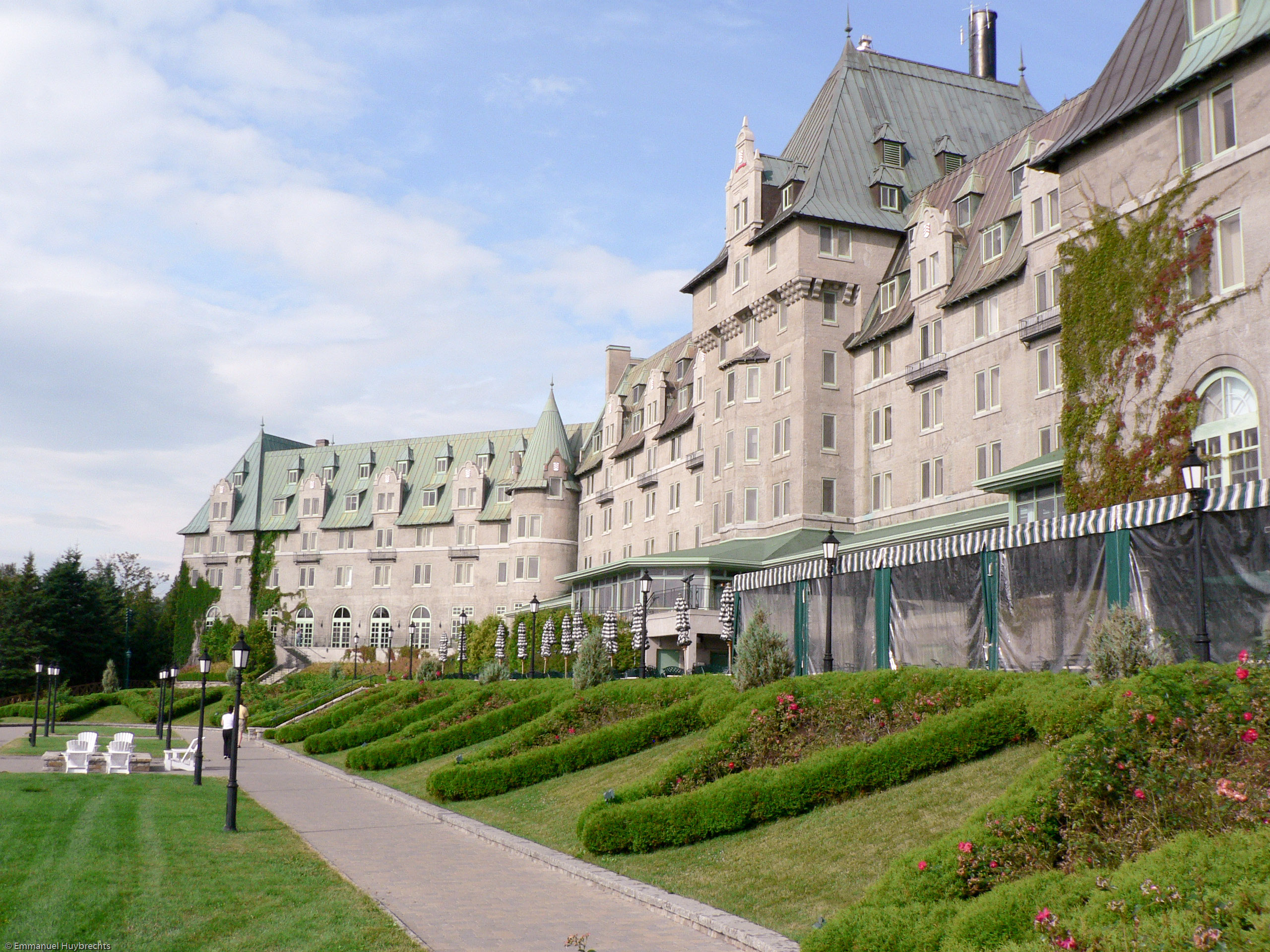
This leg's Roadblock in La Malbaie took place at Fairmont Le Manoir Richelieu, the host venue of the 44th G7 summit in 2018.

- Episode 8: "Open Your Bouche" (August 20, 2019)
- Prize: A trip for two to Santiago, Chile (awarded to Aarthy & Thinesh)

Locations

- Waterloo (CIGI Campus)
- Kitchener → La Malbaie, Quebec
- La Malbaie (Chez Chantal)
- La Malbaie (Fairmont Le Manoir Richelieu)
- Saint-Urbain (Centre de l'émeu de Charlevoix) or Baie-Saint-Paul (Famille Migneron de Charlevoix)
- Saint-Joseph-de-la-Rive (Musée Maritime de Charlevoix)

Episode summary

- At the start of this leg, teams were instructed to travel by train to La Malbaie, Quebec. Once there, teams had to travel to Chez Chantal, where they had to peel 25 potatoes, after which they received a sample of poutine and the keys to an SUV, which contained their next clue.
- In this leg's Roadblock, one team member had to dress in formal attire and take part in a mock press conference of the 44th G7 summit, which was hosted in La Malbaie in 2018. They had to memorize and correctly deliver a speech in English and French, and then answer three questions from reporters – one each in Japanese, German, and Italian – in order to receive their next clue.
- This leg's Detour was a Blind Detour, where teams only learned about the task once they reached its location, and was a choice between This or That. In This, teams had to recreate two paintings onto emu eggs at the Centre de l'Émeu de Charlevoix without removing any of the examples from the basket. After recreating the paintings, teams had to travel to Baie-Saint-Paul and deliver their eggs to one of the two buildings depicted on their eggs: the Boutique Le Pot aux Roses or the Bistro La Muse, in order to receive their next clue. In That, teams had to play a modified version of pick-lit, a local game that involved hitting a wooden peg into the air before smacking it into a marked field to score points, until they scored 200 points in order to receive their next clue.
- After the Detour, teams had to check in at the Pit Stop: the Musée Maritime de Charlevoix in Saint-Joseph-de-la-Rive.

Additional note

- There was no elimination at the end of this leg; all teams were instead instructed to continue racing.

=== Leg 9 (Quebec → Ontario) ===
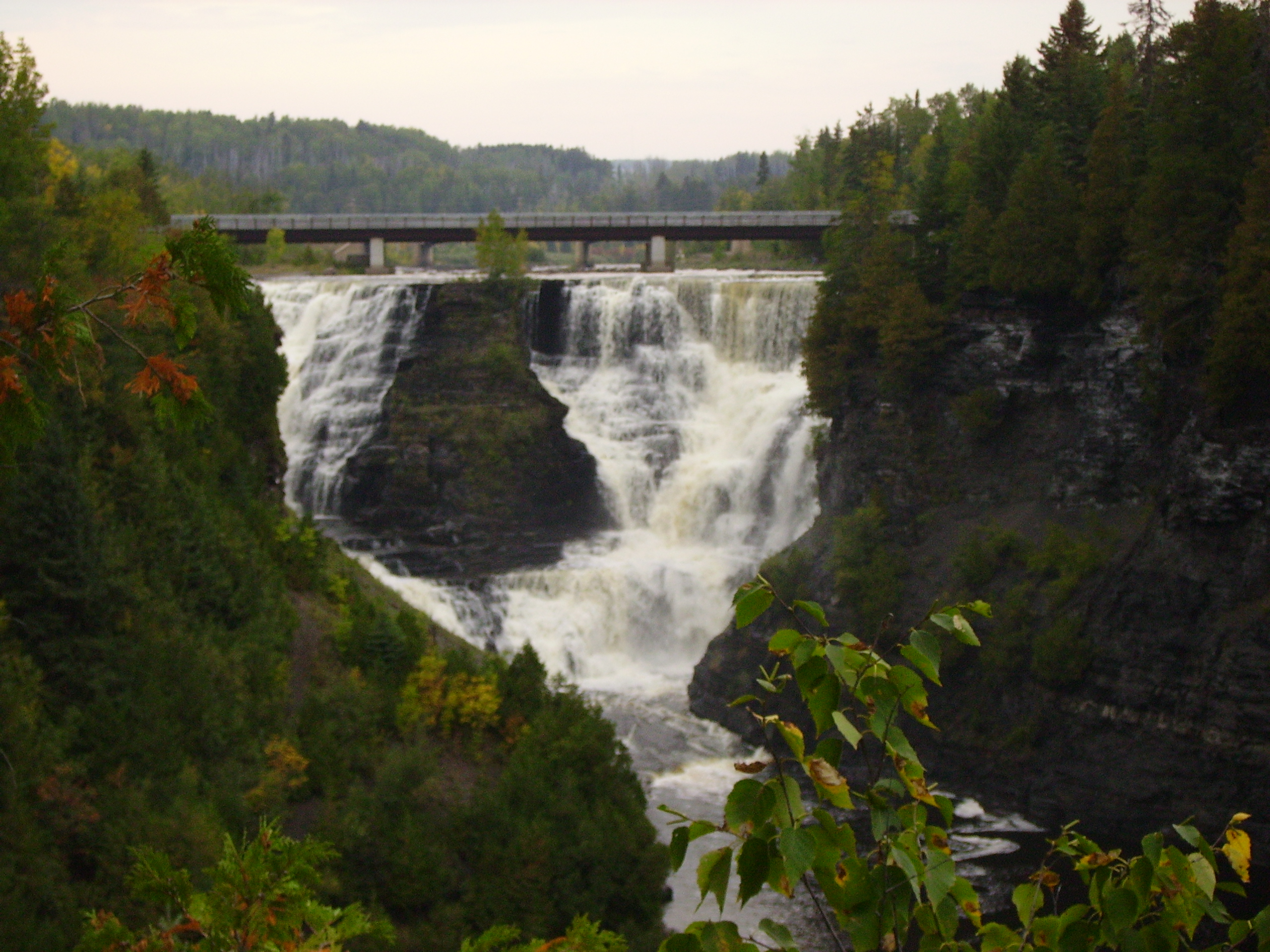
Kakabeka Falls outside Thunder Bay served as the ninth Pit Stop.

- Episode 9: "Another Day in Thunder Bay" (August 27, 2019)
- Prize: A trip for two to Venice, Italy (awarded to Dave & Irina)
- Eliminated: Aarthy & Thinesh

Locations

- Quebec City → Toronto, Ontario
- Toronto (Royal Ontario Museum)
- Toronto (Toronto Coach Terminal) → Thunder Bay (Terry Fox Memorial and Lookout)
- Thunder Bay (Shell Gas Station)
- Thunder Bay (Wacky's)
- Oliver Paipoonge (Lakehead University Faculty of Natural Resources Management Airfield) or Neebing (Thunder Oak Cheese Farm)
- Oliver Paipoonge (Kakabeka Falls)

Episode summary

- At the start of this leg, teams were instructed to travel by train back to Toronto, Ontario. Once there, teams had to travel to the Royal Ontario Museum, where they had to search for ten specific items within the exhibits. At each item, teams had to pick up a rubber stamp, and after finding all ten stamps, used them to spell out their next destination – Thunder Bay – in order to receive their next clue. At the Toronto Coach Terminal, teams had to sign up for a bus to Thunder Bay.
- Once in Thunder Bay, teams found their next clue at the Terry Fox Memorial and Lookout. Teams then had to choose a marked car and had to fill up their cars with gas in order to receive their next clue.
- For this season's second and final Face Off, two teams had to compete against each other in one of three games: air hockey, table hockey, or axe throwing. The team that arrived first got to choose the game. The team with a higher score at the end of each game received their next clue, while the losing team had to wait for another team. The last team remaining at the Face Off had to turn over an hourglass and wait out a time penalty before moving on.
- This leg's Detour was a choice between Cutting Edge or Cutting a Wedge, each with a limit of three stations. In Cutting Edge, teams had to drive to the Lakehead University Faculty of Natural Resources Management airfield, where they had to unbox a drone kit. Then, one racer had to blindly fly the drone while guided by their partner, who was wearing VR goggles with the drone's video feed, in order to find four plush moose. Once teams marked the locations of the four moose on a board, they could receive their next clue. In Cutting a Wedge, teams had to drive to Thunder Oak Cheese Farm and locate a specially numbered Gouda cheese wheel that they had to properly cut into 32 wedges before properly packaging them in order to receive their next clue.
- After the Detour, teams had to check in at the Pit Stop: Kakabeka Falls.

=== Leg 10 (Ontario → Nova Scotia) ===
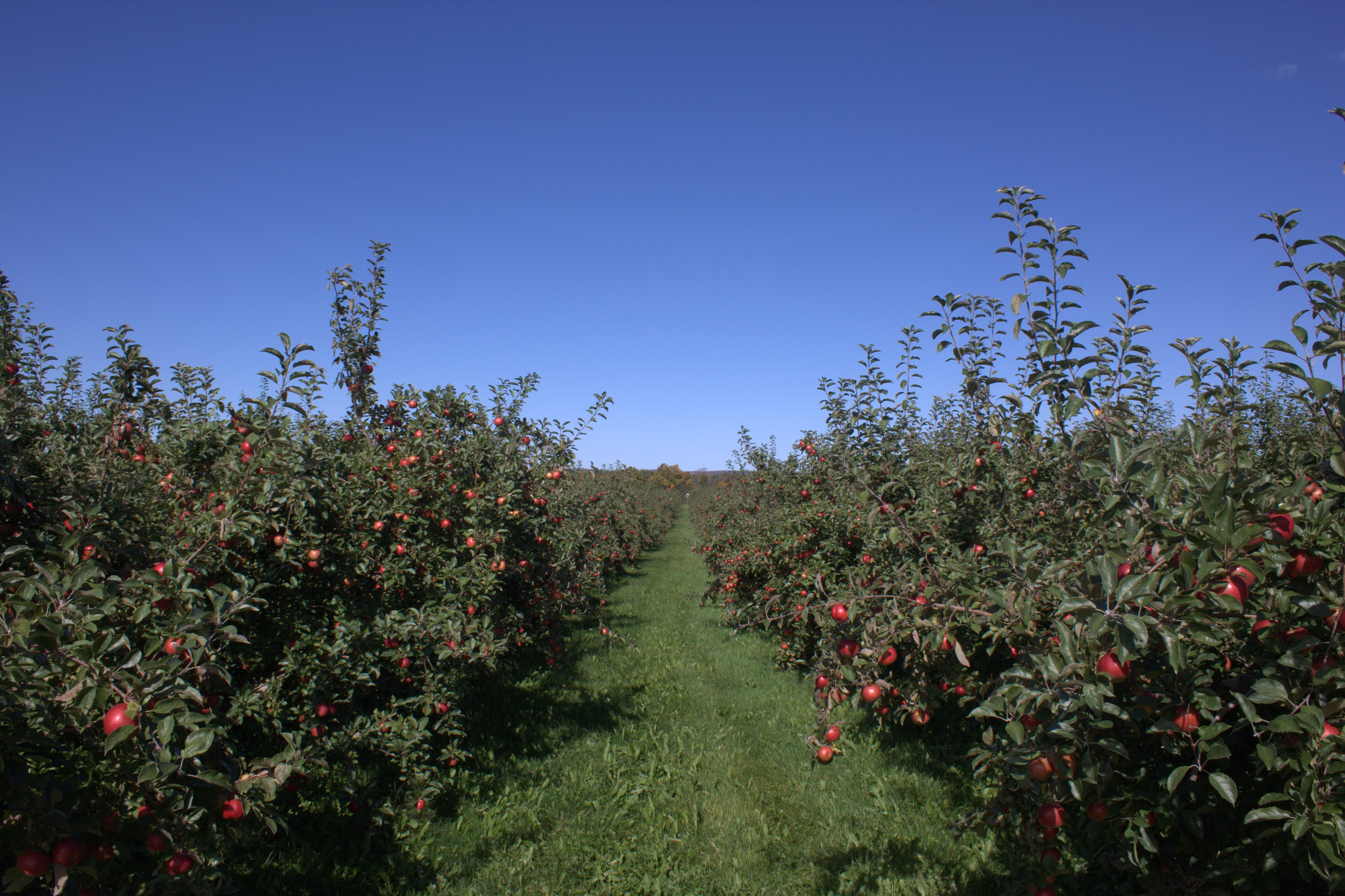
One Detour option in Nova Scotia involved teams sorting apples, a crop grown in the Annapolis Valley.

- Episode 10: "He's Basically a Hound" (September 3, 2019)
- Prize: A trip for two to Singapore (awarded to Anthony & James)
- Eliminated: Dave & Irina

Locations

- Thunder Bay (Marina Park)
- Thunder Bay → Halifax, Nova Scotia (Halifax Stanfield International Airport)
- Grand-Pré (Tangled Garden)
- Wolfville (Elderkin's Farm Market)
- Wolfville (Acadia University – Andrew H. McCain Arena) or Greenwich (Noggin's Corner Farm Market)
- Port Williams (Taproot Farms)
- Wolfville (The Church Brewing Co.)
- Gaspereau (Luckett Vineyards)

Episode summary

- At the start of this leg, teams were instructed to fly to Halifax, Nova Scotia. Once there, teams had to find a marked vehicle, which contained their next clue in a secret compartment. Teams then found their next clue at the Tangled Garden.
- In this leg's Roadblock, one team member had to search the Tangled Garden for seven herbs: basil, mint, sage, rosemary, thyme, tarragon, and chives. They then had to taste and match seven jams and jellies with the herb used to make them in order to receive their next clue.
- After the Roadblock, teams found their next clue at Elderkin's Farm Market.
- This season's final Detour was a choice between Puck or Apples. In Puck, teams had to travel to the Andrew H. McCain Arena, where they had to play sledge hockey with team members passing a puck to each other through a practice course and scoring a goal in under one minute in order to receive their next clue. In Apples, teams had to travel to Noggin's Corner Farm Market, where they had to sort a bin of twelve varieties of apples in order to receive their next clue.
- After the Detour, teams had to drive to Taproot Farms, use the backup camera on their trucks to transcribe five stanzas of the folk song "Farewell to Nova Scotia", and arrange them in the correct order. Teams then had to hitch a trailer full of beer and deliver it to The Church Brewing Co., where they had to sing the song alongside a local country band in order to receive their next clue. Teams were given a photograph of Jon Montgomery next to a red telephone box and had to figure out that it was located at the Luckett Vineyards, which was the Pit Stop for this leg.

=== Leg 11 (Nova Scotia → Ontario) ===
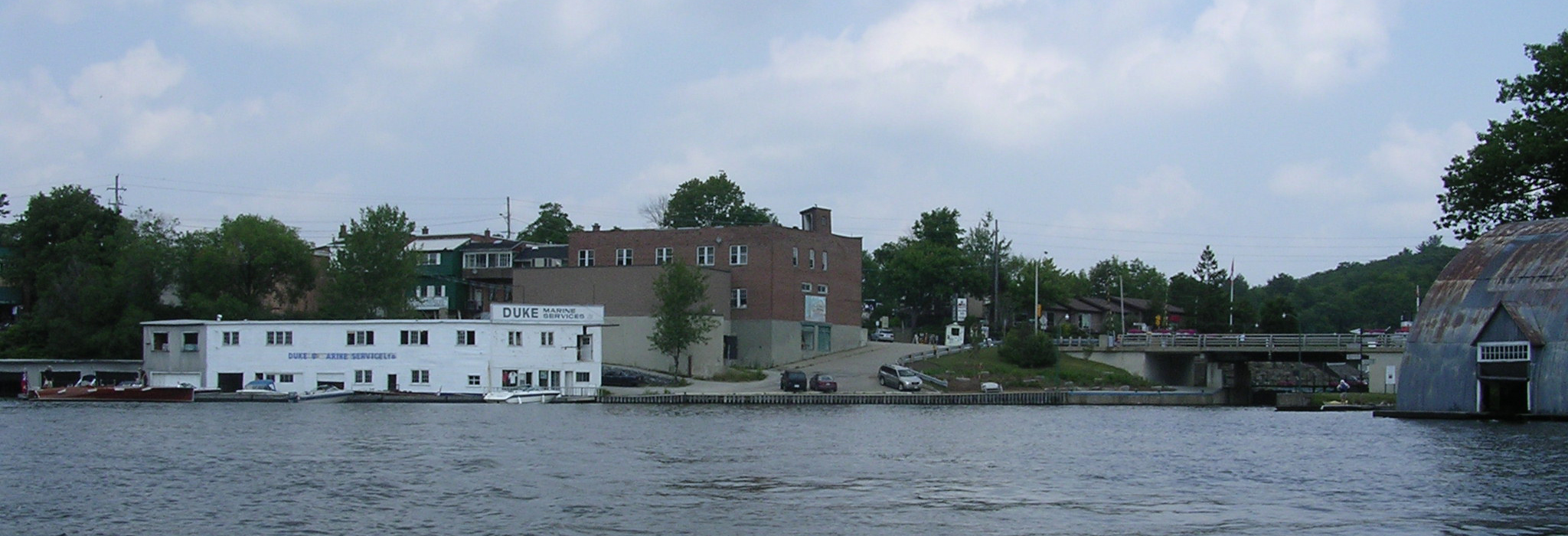
Teams visited Port Carling on Lake Muskoka during the final leg of The Amazing Race Canada 7.

- Episode 11: "I Had One Job" (September 10, 2019)
- Prizes: A CA$250,000 cash payout, a trip for two around the world, and a 2019 Chevrolet Blazer for each team member (awarded to Anthony & James)
- Winners: Anthony & James
- Runners-up: Sarah & Sam
- Third place: Lauren & Joanne

Locations

- Wolfville (Wolfville Waterfront Park)
- Halifax → Toronto, Ontario
- (Floatplane) Toronto (Toronto Pearson International Airport – Executive Terminal) → Port Carling (Lake Rosseau – Port Carling Dock)
- Port Carling (Muskoka Lakes Museum)
- Port Carling (Port Carling Wall)
- Minett (Clevelands House)
- Rosseau (Rosseau Lake College)
- Bracebridge (Santa's Village)
- Bala (Muskoka Lakes Farm & Winery – Johnston's Cranberry Marsh)
- Port Sydney (Camp Mini-Yo-We)

Episode summary

- At the start of this leg, teams were instructed to fly back to Toronto, Ontario. Once there, teams had to find an airport limousine and travel to the executive terminal, where they signed up for one of three floatplanes to Port Carling. Teams found their next clue on Port Carling Dock instructing them to travel to the Muskoka Lakes Museum, where they were joined by Jon Montgomery and had to play a life-size trivia board game. They had to roll large red dice to land on legs and correctly answer trivia questions. Once teams collected all of the legs on the board, they received their next clue, which directed them to a clue box next to the Port Carling Wall.
- In this leg's first Roadblock, one team member had to fly a hydroflying jet pack called a Flyboard at least 15 feet (4.6 m) out of the water before throwing a bean bag into a target in order to receive their next clue.
- After the first Roadblock, teams had to travel by boat to Rosseau. At Rosseau Lake College, teams had to build an eight-foot (2.4 m) tall Muskoka chair with only a small model as an example in order to receive their next clue.
- In this season's final Roadblock, the team member who did not perform the previous Roadblock had to find one of three elves with a red and yellow candy cane that they had to deliver to Santa Claus, who gave them their next clue.
- After the second Roadblock, teams had to assemble an irrigation system across an immense cranberry bog at Johnston's Cranberry Marsh without any leaks in order to receive their final clue, which directed them to the finish line at Camp Mini-Yo-We in Port Sydney.

== Ratings ==
No.	Title	Air date	Viewers (millions)	Weekly rank	Ref.
1	"Canada Get More Maps"	July 2, 2019	2.03	1	
2	"Our Competition's Not That Smart"	July 9, 2019 (Note: Episode 2 aired at 9:30 PM ET/8 PM MT due to the Love Island series premiere)	1.75	1	
3	"We'll Let the Peasants Fight for Last Place"	July 16, 2019	1.89	1	
4	"I Love Geologists"	July 23, 2019	1.80	1	
5	"Clamageddon Continues"	July 30, 2019	1.78	1	
6	"I'm a Little Muskrat on a Mission"	August 6, 2019	1.91	1	
7	"Balls, Balls, Balls"	August 13, 2019	2.12	1	
8	"Open Your Bouche"	August 20, 2019	2.07	1	
9	"Another Day in Thunder Bay"	August 27, 2019	2.02	1	
10	"He's Basically a Hound"	September 3, 2019	1.86	1	
11	"I Had One Job"	September 10, 2019	2.13	1	
