= Petroglyph (disambiguation) =

A petroglyph is an image carved or engraved on a rock surface.

Petroglyph may also refer to:

- Petroglyph (album)
- Petroglyph Games, a real-time strategy games development studio.
- Petroglyph National Monument, a national monument in New Mexico
- Petroglyph Provincial Park, a provincial park near Nanaimo, British Columbia, Canada
