= James Makokis =

Indigenous Canadian family physician

- Born: 1981 or 1982 (age 43–44)
- Citizenship: Canadian
- Education: University of Toronto; University of Ottawa; University of British Columbia
- Occupation: Physician
- Known for: The Amazing Race Canada 7
- Spouse: Anthony Johnson

James A. Makokis (born 1981 or 1982) is a Saddle Lake Cree Nation, two-spirited Family physician. In 2019, he and his husband competed together as a team on, and won, The Amazing Race Canada 7.

== Career ==
Makokis operates a clinic in the Enoch Cree Nation 135 serving the Kehewin and Enoch Cree Nations, and a satellite clinic in Edmonton, Alberta. Makokis is an Indigenous two-spirit person and is particularly noted for treating transgender people from the Cree communities and around the world, with many patients traveling from long distances to see him. His practice combines traditional Cree and Western medical practices.

Makokis wanted to be a doctor since he was four, and as an adult his colleague Adrian Edgar (a former president of the Canadian Professional Association for Transgender Health) suggested Makokis focus on trans healthcare, because few physicians were providing medical care for transitioning patients in that region; additionally many trans as well as Indigenous people can be wary of the mainstream health system and doctors from their own communities are sought after. He earned his Master's in health science from the University of Toronto in 2006, and graduated from the University of Ottawa's medical school in 2010 and the University of British Columbia's Aboriginal Family Medicine Residency Training Program in 2012. He is trained in family medicine.

Makokis has also worked as an instructor at Yellowhead Tribal College, teaching courses on Indigenous health and traditional medicine, and at the University of Alberta and the University of Toronto.

== Personal life and activism ==
Makokis grew up in the Saddle Lake Cree Nation. His mother is Patricia Makokis, a former president of Blue Quills University.

Makokis is gay, and married Anthony Johnson, a Navajo (Diné) artist and two-spirit, in 2017 during the Vancouver Marathon.

In 2019, Makokis and Johnson competed together as a team on The Amazing Race Canada 7 and won. They spoke to the media about their hopes that, by being open about who they are on the show, that they might help LGBTQIA+ youth feel safe in being who they are, and that their visibility has hopefully opened the way for more conversations about issues facing the Two-Spirit, Indigenous, and Missing and Murdered Indigenous Women communities.

== Awards ==
Makokis was a 2007 youth recipient of the Indspire Award, which celebrates and encourages excellence in the First Nations, Inuit, and Métis communities.
