= Victoria Park station (Kitchener) =

Light rail station in Kitchener, Ontario

Victoria Park
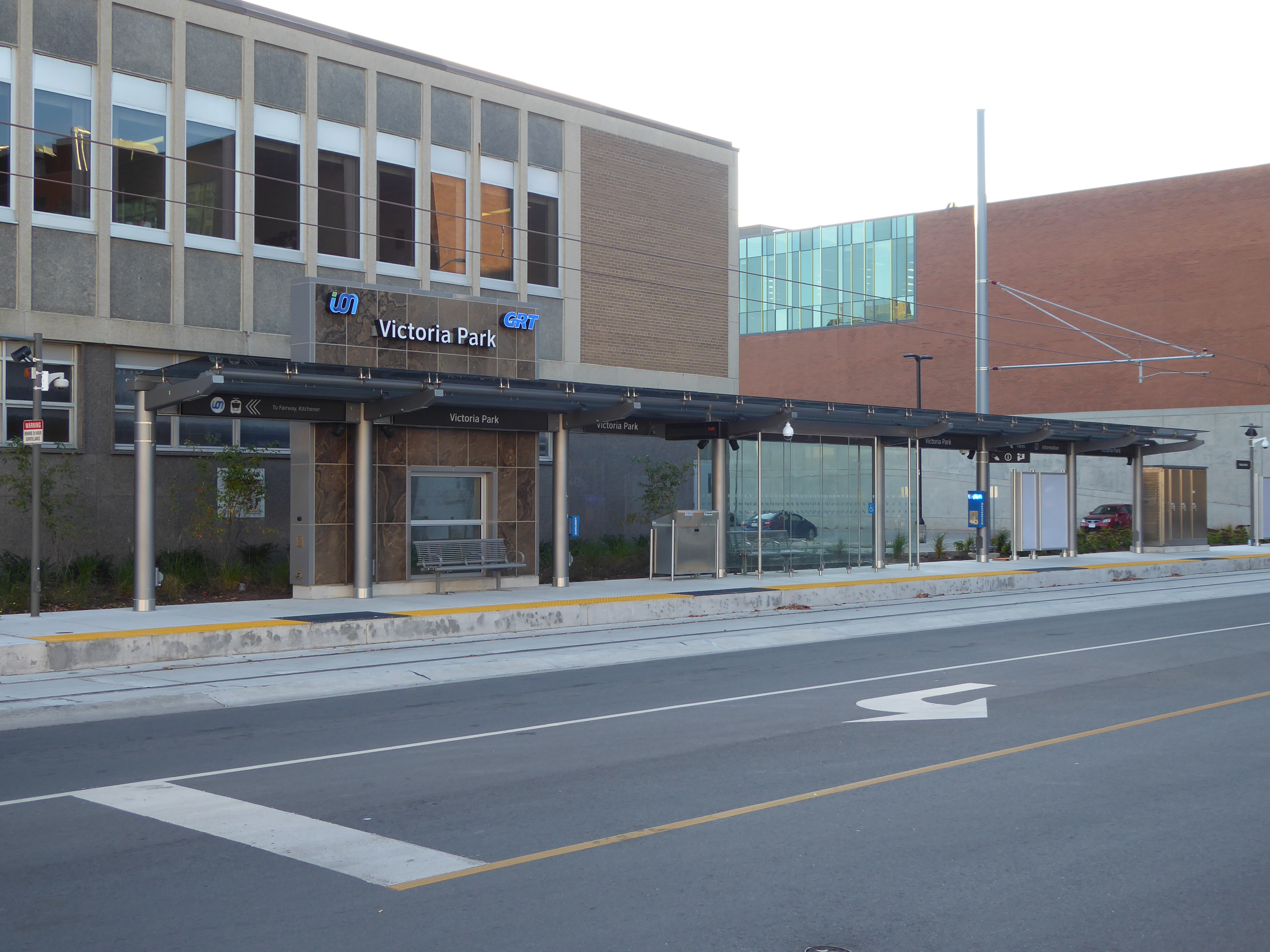
- Station structurally complete, October 2017. 44 Gaukel can be seen in the background.

General information
- Location: Kitchener, Ontario; Canada
- Coordinates: 43.45016°N 80.49354°W
- Platforms: Side platform
- Tracks: 1
- Connections: GRT buses: 6 Bridge-Courtland

Construction
- Accessible: Yes

Other information
- Status: Open

History
- Opened: June 21, 2019

Services
Preceding station	Grand River Transit	Following station
Central Station One-way operation	Ion	Queen toward Fairway
Location

Victoria Park is a stop on the Region of Waterloo's Ion rapid transit system. It is located alongside Charles Street, just west of Gaukel Street, in Kitchener. Its namesake, Victoria Park, has its eastern entrance about 100 metres (330 ft) south of the station along Gaukel. It opened in 2019.

The station serves southbound trains only; the nearest northbound platform is at Kitchener City Hall station, about 250 metres (820 ft) away up Gaukel and Young streets.

The station's feature wall consists of brown stone tiles with flowing, random striations. The platform is connected with Charles Street's sidewalks at either end, and pedestrians passing through walk along the platform.

The station is located at the southwest corner of the intersection of Charles Street West and Gaukel Street. It is immediately adjacent to 44 Gaukel Street, a modernist building constructed in 1962–64, which was formerly a Canada Post depot before it was converted to its current use as an arts centre. Across Gaukel Street is the Charles Street Transit Terminal, the former Grand River Transit hub in Kitchener until the launch of light rail service in 2019; it is now completely shuttered. Across Charles Street from the station is the 31-storey Charlie West condominium development, one of the tallest in the area.

The section of Gaukel Street between Charles Street and Joseph Street was pedestrianized in the summer of 2020, during the COVID-19 pandemic. This came after a campaign by residents to pedestrianize the street, with city planners identifying it as a significant pedestrian corridor connecting the city hall and King Street with Victoria Park and its adjacent light rail station.
