= Deep Bay Marine Field Station =

Research facility in British Columbia

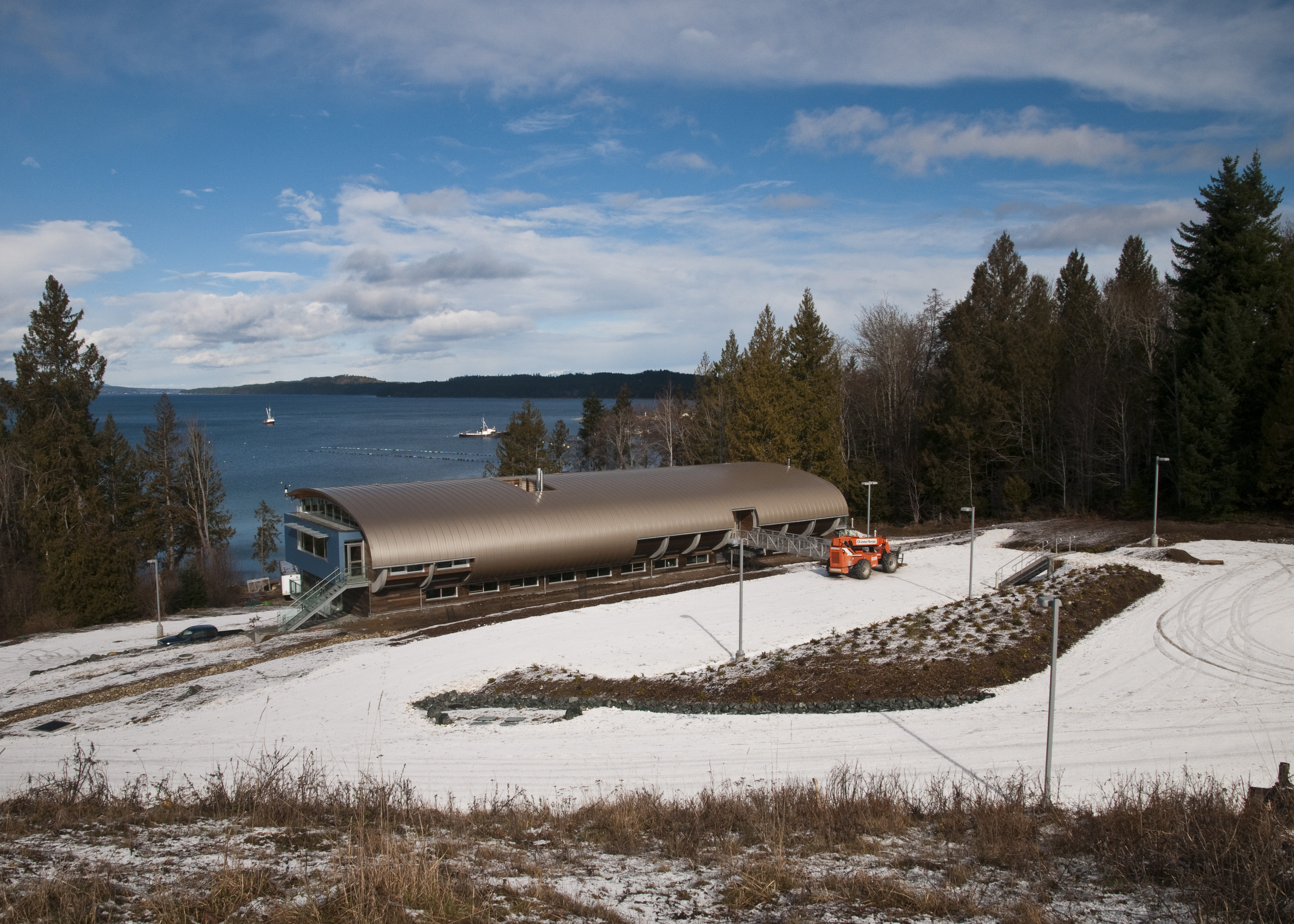
- Formation: May 1, 2011; 15 years ago
- Purpose: Shellfish Research and Education
- Headquarters: Vancouver Island University
- Location: Deep Bay, British Columbia
- Coordinates: 49°27′21.31″N 124°44′06.15″W
- Parent organization: Centre for Shellfish Research, Vancouver Island University
- Website: https://research.viu.ca/deep-bay-marine-field-station

The Deep Bay Marine Field Station is a marine science research and education facility operated by Vancouver Island University. It is located at Deep Bay, British Columbia on Vancouver Island, off the waters of Baynes Sound, 78 kilometres (48 mi) north-west of the main university campus at Nanaimo, British Columbia. The building received the first LEED platinum rating among Canadian universities and a 2011 National Green Buildings Award and opened in 2011.

Research facilities include a seawater tank farm, four laboratories, a demonstration shellfish farm and a combined research facility for shellfish aquaculture, marine ecology and water quality. Education facilities include two display aquaria, touch tanks, a large classroom, and exhibits.

(https://deepbay.viu.ca/)

== Research ==
Early priorities were research concerning geoduck clams and the possibility of restoring native Olympia oysters in the area. The goal of the facility is "supporting sustainable shellfish aquaculture development and preserving coastal ecosystems." Other early research included creating a NextGen Shellfish Hatchery to helps supply local farmers with oyster seed.

Current research focuses on oyster broodstock conditioning. This long-term initiative is being carried out in partnership between VIU and the BC Shellfish Growers Association. This project is an environmental adaption initiative to address changing water conditions in Baynes Sound and the Salish Sea in general. Ocean acidification has made it more difficult for shellfish larvae to form a shell. This has impacted wild stocks and has impacted shellfish hatcheries ability to spawn and grow shellfish. This project is a selective breeding initiative designed to promote shellfish lines that are naturally resistant to changing environmental conditions while still maintaining a sufficiently diverse genetic base. We hope to develop a pool of brood stock for industry that performs well in Baynes Sound and the Salish Sea.

in 2025 the station also began to host kelp forest restoration research by the Kelp Rescue Initiative.

== Education ==
The Deep Bay Marine Field Station also provides educational opportunities for K-12 students, VIU students, external post-secondary institutions and the general public. The website provides further details (https://deepbay.viu.ca/)

K-12

- A hands-on childhood experience in marine science can be a life changing event. We host field trips for scientists of all ages on a variety of marine science related themes.

VIU Students

- The station hosts practicums, internships, and other experiential learning opportunities for students in a variety of programs at VIU. Most of our students are enrolled in VIU's Fisheries and Aquaculture program but opportunities are available for students in other programs to work in our algal and larval labs, plus other opportunities in analyzing data, building innovative computer operating systems, and business analysis for the shellfish aquaculture industry.

The Public

- The field station provides many learning opportunities for the public. Aquariums and touch tanks help interpret the local marine environment to our visitors. Exhibits on local whales, including two whale skeletons, on marine invertebrates and more await visitors. Guided tours provide interpretation of research and current marine science themes. Public and specialist events and workshops support local research and conservation initiatives.
