= Muskoka Lakes Museum =

Independent non-profit community museum

- Established: July 2, 1967
- Location: Port Carling, Ontario, Canada
- Type: History
- Founder: Marion Catto

Muskoka Lakes Museum is an independent non-profit community museum, focusing on the history of the Muskoka Lakes. It is located in James Bartleman Island Park and accessed by footbridge from the village of Port Carling in the Township of Muskoka Lakes, District of Muskoka, in Ontario, Canada.

The museum features six exhibition spaces focusing on First Nations and area pioneer history, the history and culture of boating and boat-building in the Muskoka Lakes region, cottages and resorts from the mid-1800s to the mid-1900s, and a gallery for local art exhibits.

The museum is open annually from Victoria Day until the Canadian Thanksgiving Day weekend.

Many programs at the museum are for children, including school group activities, day-camper programs in the summer, children's parties and outdoor games alongside interactive exhibits.

The museum also offers walking tours of the village of Port Carling, lecture series, trivia nights, and traditional craft workshops.

== History ==
The idea for the Muskoka Lakes Museum was conceived when Marion Catto started the Port Carling Historical Society on September 9, 1961.

The Muskoka Lakes Museum was first opened on July 2, 1967, under the name “The Port Carling Museum”. The sign that was displayed above the front entrance at the time of opening, and now hangs in the museum's Marine Room.

In 1972, the museum added the Catto Wing, named in honour of Marion Catto and her husband, Lieutenant-Colonel Catto. As collections grew, other additions were added in 1976, 1977, and again in 1983.

In 1982, the museum purchased a log cabin, built in 1875 in the nearby village of Glen Orchard. The structure was disassembled, moved, and reassembled at the museum in 1983, and opened officially to the public on July 14, 1984.

In 1989, the Board of Directors changed the name of the museum to the “Muskoka Lakes Museum” in order to be able to represent and serve all of the Muskoka Lakes District and not just the village of Port Carling.
