= Charles Street Transit Terminal =

Bus terminal in Kitchener, Ontario

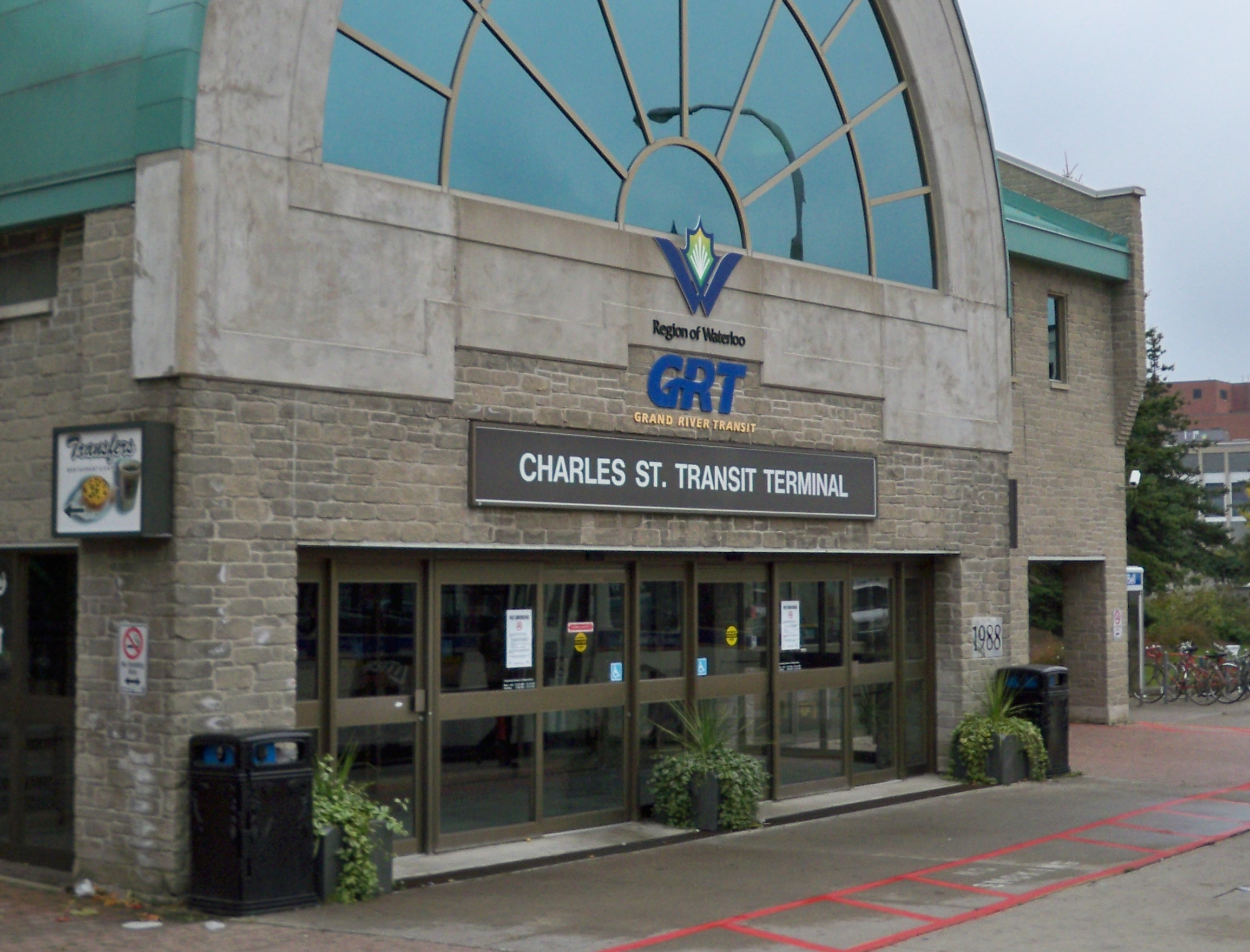

General information
- Location: 15 Charles Street West; Kitchener, Ontario; Canada
- Coordinates: 43°26′58″N 80°29′32″W
- Owner: Region of Waterloo
- Operator: Grand River Transit
- Bus stands: 25
- Bus operators: GO Transit; Coach Canada

Construction
- Structure type: Ticket office, washrooms, waiting room, restaurant, covered platforms
- Cycle facilities: Yes
- Accessible: Yes
- Architect: John Lingwood
- Architectural style: Modernist

Other information
- Station code: GO Transit: KITB

History
- Opened: 1988 (City of Kitchener)
- Closed: 2019 (station facilities and local bus service)
Location

The Charles Street Transit Terminal is a former bus terminal in Kitchener, Ontario, Canada. It is the former downtown hub for local Grand River Transit (GRT) bus services for Kitchener and Waterloo, although the terminal now sits vacant and mostly abandoned.

It was the largest public service facility run by GRT, with the Cambridge Ainslie Street terminal being the only other staffed bus station, as well as once serving a number of commuter and intercity bus routes with GO Transit, and Coach Canada.

== History ==
=== Terminal location ===
The terminal site is bounded by Charles, Gaukel, Joseph, and Ontario Streets in Kitchener's downtown core. However, earlier in the 20th century the site was considered to be on the edge of downtown. This changed in 1947, when the Bullas department store opened on the site as the anchor for the Bullas Building, a mixed-use building which at various times was used for residential, commercial, and industrial purposes. The Bullas brothers, Ross and Roy, had expanded to the site from an earlier location on Joseph Street which was used for their father's furniture storage and distribution business. The move coincided with a wave of postwar prosperity and suburbanization which created a greater demand for fine home goods such as furniture and appliances from Kitchener's manufacturers, but which would ultimately undermine the downtown commercial area with the construction of suburban shopping malls like the Fairview Park Mall in the 1960s and 1970s.

At the time, Charles Street only ran as far east as Ontario Street, where it dead ended, and it was "little more than a lane". The Bullas move resulted in the addition of streetscape amenities such as streetlights and a small plaza with an ornamental concrete fountain, the sculptures from which are now owned by the City of Kitchener and displayed at the Centre in the Square several blocks to the northeast. Pressure mounted from local groups advocating an extension of Charles Street, which included the Bullas brothers. By the late 1950s, Charles was extended to Benton Street through an intersection with Queen Street, creating irregular curves in an otherwise straight downtown street. The extension was carved through a downtown block bounded by Ontario, King, Benton, and Church Streets, and led to a number of historic commercial buildings being razed. Ultimately it joined up Charles with Alma Street, the latter of which was incorporated into Charles Street. Subsequent widenings would devastate the old stretch of Alma Street (now Charles Street East) and create an auto-oriented landscape which proved advantageous for bus operations.

=== The terminal ===
The building, which was designed by the local modernist architect John Lingwood, was completed in 1988 by the City of Kitchener, which operated Kitchener Transit, GRT's forerunner, at the time. It replaced a facility at Duke and Scott streets, which had become overcrowded. Ownership transferred to the Region of Waterloo (the operator of GRT) on January 1, 2000, when Kitchener Transit and Cambridge Transit were merged.

In 2002, the Transfers Café moved into the terminal's restaurant location, which it occupied until the closure of the building.

Local bus service at the terminal ceased on June 24, 2019, with the launch of the Ion rapid transit system and reorganization of bus routes to feed the LRT. Road access to the terminal was limited to the first and last lanes, for intercity service and GO buses respectively. The remaining three lanes were barricaded using concrete walls.

On September 7, service to Toronto and intercity bus service from the station was terminated, making the terminal redundant. GO Transit and Greyhound were moved to curbside stops in the vicinity of the terminal, with the last roadways into and out of the facility blocked with barriers and the building itself locked.

The future of the terminal's site is unclear, although it will likely be sold, demolished and redeveloped. In the meantime, it remains owned by the Region, sitting abandoned. In late 2020, a COVID-19 testing centre was established on the site by Grand River Hospital; testing is administered on the former platforms for drive-through patients while medical staff use the building to maintain supplies and keep warm in winter weather.

Public consultations on the fate of the property are set to begin in the autumn of 2021; no final decision is expected before mid-2022. A proposal by members of Kitchener's Land Back Camp to build an Indigenous community centre on the site inspired a documentary, Imaginings and Recollections, after gaining support in a local petition and a design proposal from several architecture students at the University of Waterloo.

== Facilities ==
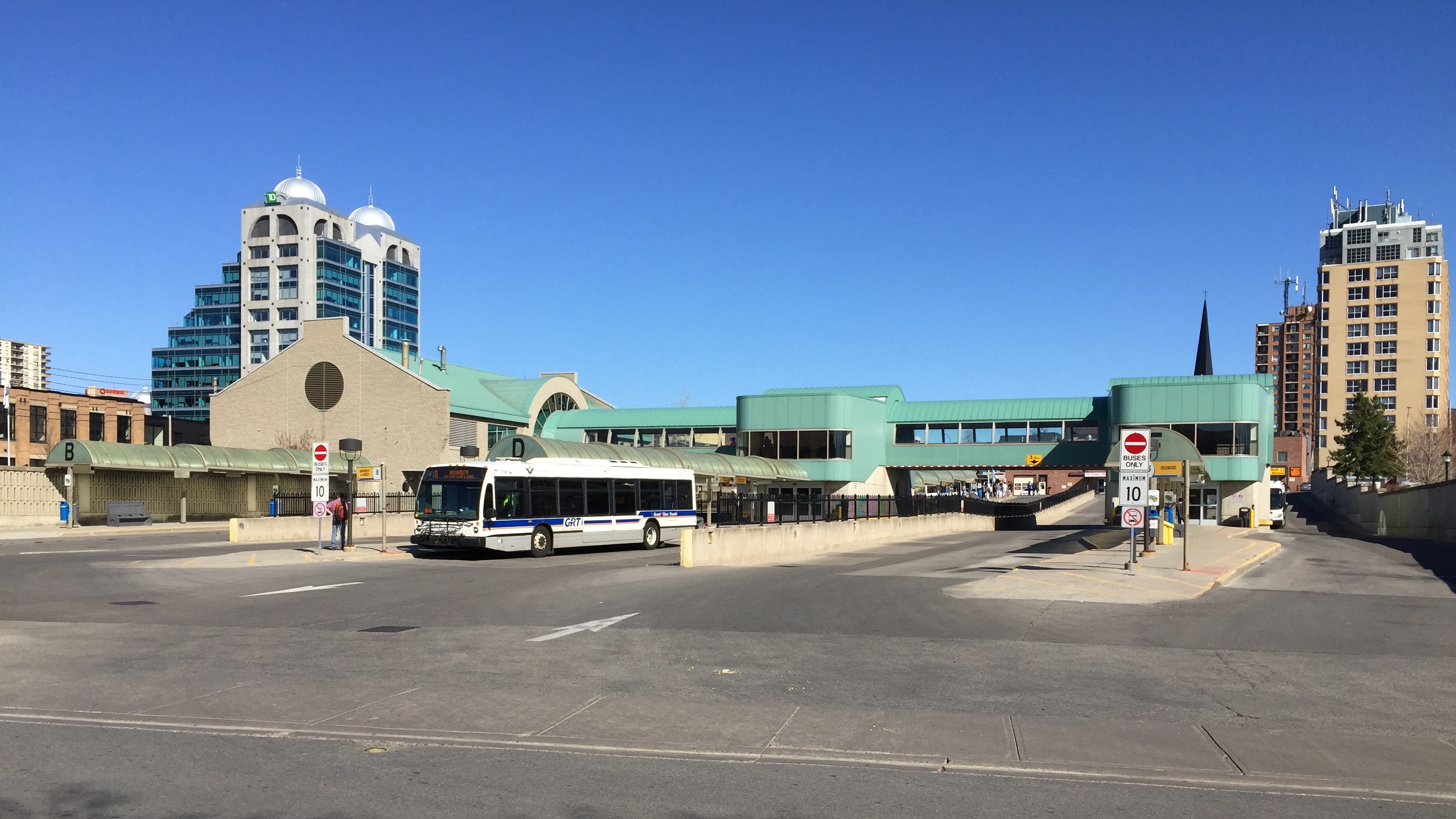
View bus platforms from Gaukel St.

When it provided GRT service, the main terminal building contained the ticket desk, plus washrooms and administrative space on the upper level; the lower level had a licensed restaurant and walk-in café, plus an ATM. Access between the floors was by escalator or elevator. Access to the bus platforms from the entry structure was by an enclosed, elevated walkway. Each of the two island platform groups have a 'pod' containing stairwells and an elevator, which also served as enclosed, climate-controlled waiting space for passengers, with a total of 20 bus stop locations. Since the stop of GRT services, only a small interior space on the lower level served as a waiting area until the withdrawal of intercity bus service, when the entire building was closed to the public.

== Future ==
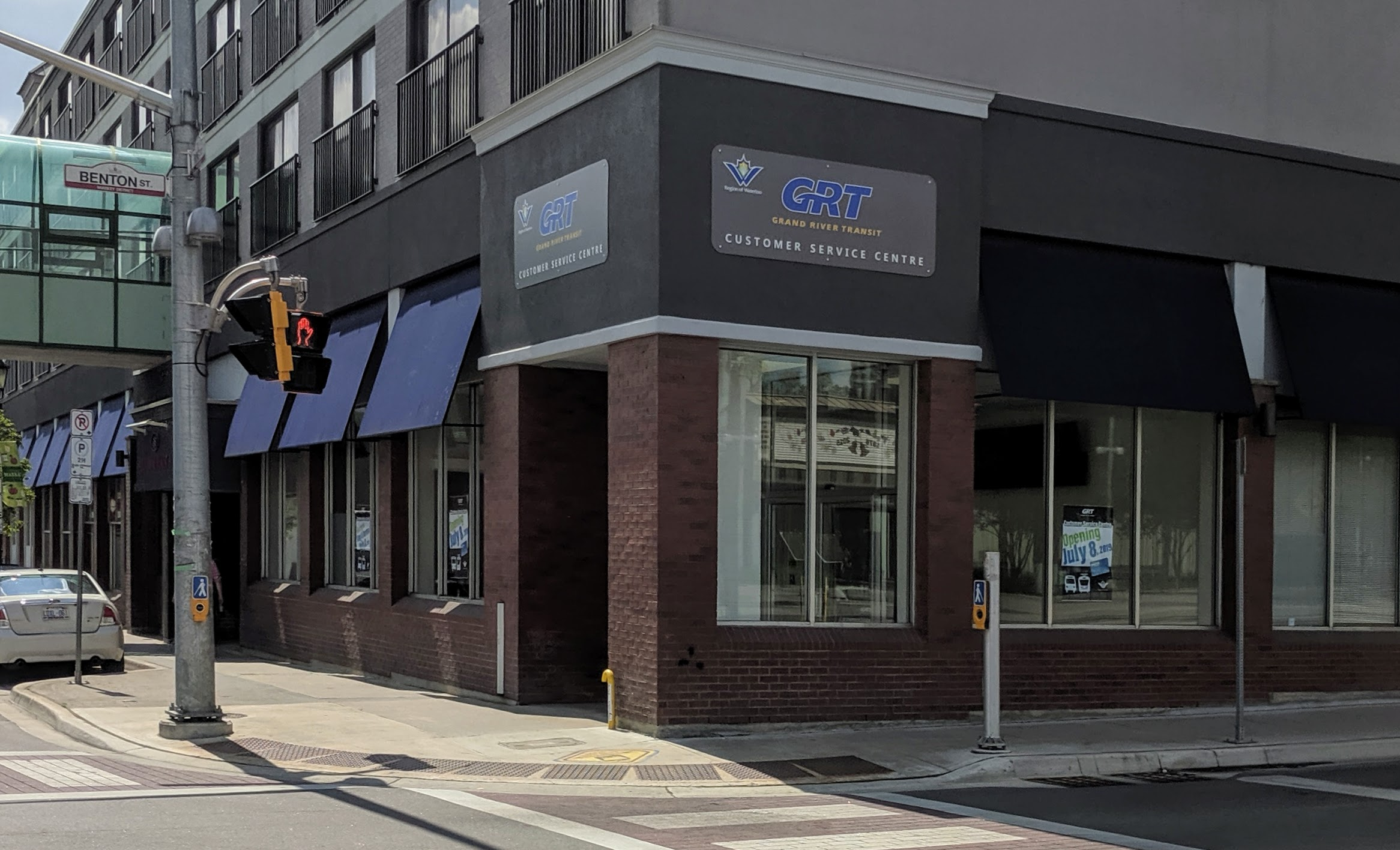
The replacement customer service centre, at King and Benton streets

The Charles St. Terminal has become redundant due to the Region of Waterloo's ambitious transportation plans. With the implementation of a rapid-transit backbone which decentralized bus routes and required fewer platforms at a single downtown location taking effect on June 24, 2019, Grand River Transit buses no longer had a need to serve a central terminal as they now fed Ion stations directly.

In addition, the Region of Waterloo also plans to build a multi-modal hub at King and Victoria streets (dubbed "Central Station") to handle train, bus, and rapid transit services. In addition to handling the need for regional and commuter buses, Central Station would also replace the existing railway station. This hub does not yet have a firm date for completion, with 2022 being the earliest date available.

GRT customer service functions moved to a location at 105 King Street East in July 2019, where they will be served in the interim.

The LRT's Victoria Park station serving southbound trains is located just across Gaukel Street from the terminal, and Queen station sits two blocks south at Charles and Queen. Kitchener City Hall station serves northbound traffic from four blocks away at Duke and Young.

== Bus services ==
As of May 2022, the Grand River Transit website shows that no intercity buses use the Charles Street Transit Terminal. GO Transit buses stop at Kitchener station instead of the Charles Street Transit Terminal.

In 2017, GO Transit used to serve a curbside stop on Queen Street South; where the entrance to the lane formerly serving their segment of the terminal had been blocked. The former GO services in 2017 were:

- 25 Waterloo/Mississauga GO Bus service between Square One Bus Terminal and the University of Waterloo.
- 30 Kitchener/Bramalea GO Bus service between Kitchener GO Station and the Bramalea GO Station.
