= Petroglyph Provincial Park =

Provincial park in British Columbia, Canada

- IUCN category III (natural monument or feature)
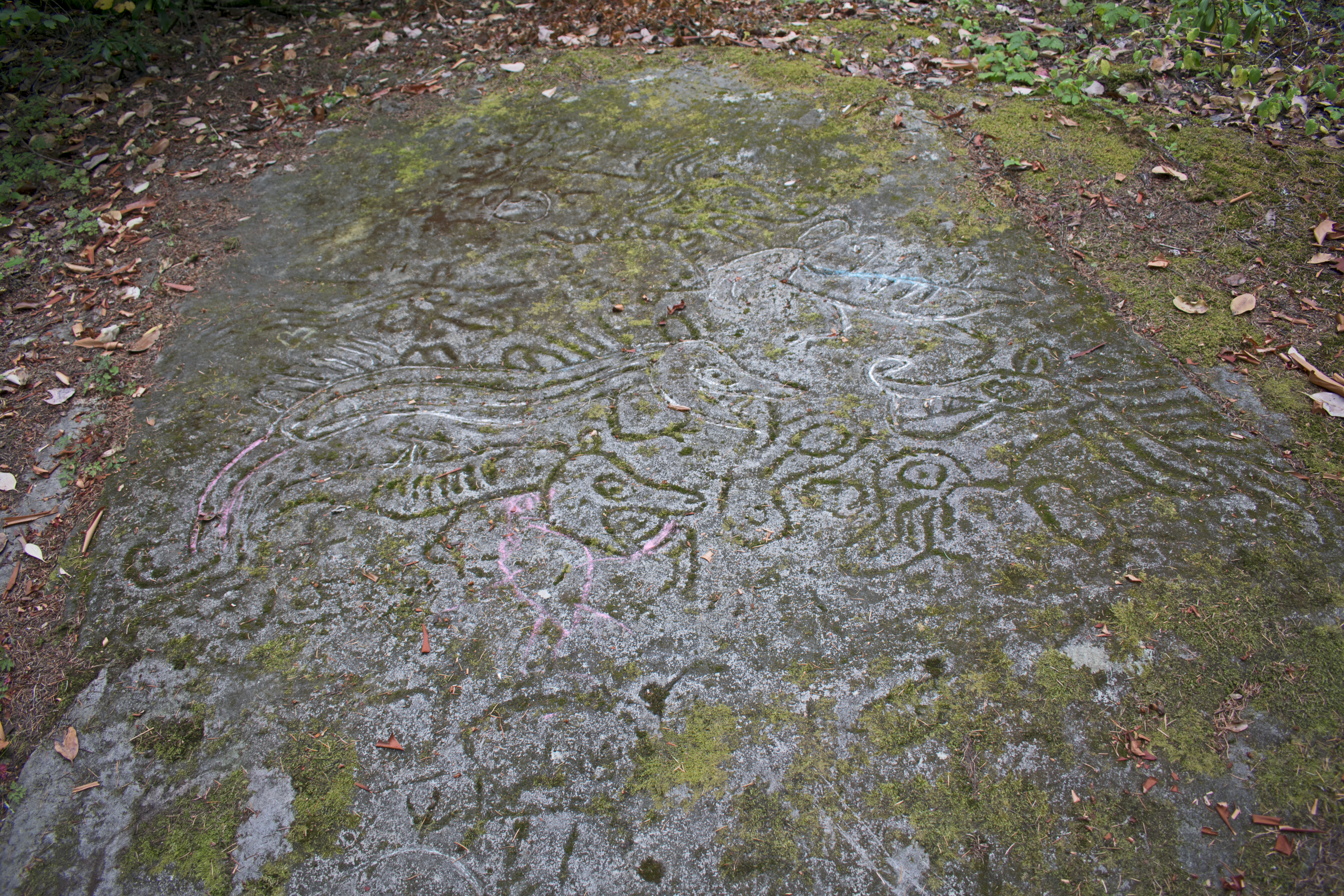
- Petroglyphs

- Location within Vancouver Island Location within British Columbia Location within Regional District of Nanaimo
- Interactive map of Petroglyph Provincial Park
- Location: Nanaimo, British Columbia
- Coordinates: 49°08′27″N 123°55′36″W
- Area: 2 ha (4.9 acres)
- Designation: Class A Provincial Park
- Established: August 24, 1948
- Governing body: BC Parks

Petroglyph Provincial Park is a Canadian provincial park located at the south end of the city of Nanaimo, British Columbia. The park was established on August 24, 1948, to protect a collection of petroglyphs found near the estuary of the Nanaimo River.

== Cultural history ==
The park hosts a remarkably high concentration of petroglyphs that date to at least the 10th century CE. These carvings depict mythological sea creatures, human figures, and animals that are symbolic of the spiritual and cultural history of the Coast Salish and Snuneymuxw First Nations.

The locations of these carvings were almost always made where forces of nature were believed to be especially strong. These areas are usually marked by a natural feature such as a waterfall or rock formation.

== Facilities ==
No facilities are provided at this park.
