= Sunrise Centre =

Bus terminal in Kitchener, Ontario

Sunrise Centre Station

General information
- Location: Sunrise Shopping Centre Kitchener, Ontario; Canada
- Coordinates: 43°24′55″N 80°31′02″W
- Owner: Region of Waterloo
- Operator: Grand River Transit
- Bus routes: 4
- Bus stands: 4
- Bus operators: Grand River Transit
- Connections: GRT buses: 205 iXpress Ottawa/Lackner; 3 Ottawa South; 22 Laurentian West; 33 Huron

Construction
- Structure type: Heated shelter
- Cycle facilities: Yes
- Accessible: Yes

History
- Opened: 2019
Location

The Sunrise Centre Station is a bus station and terminal in Kitchener, Ontario, Canada.

The station is a single platform with bus bays on each side. The platform has a heated shelter with seats inside, LED real-time displays and map boards. There is a crosswalk at the northern end of the platform which connects to the shopping centre. Also at the north end is a station pillar which features the name and facilies at the station

== History ==
The Sunrise Centre Station was built as a new station for expanding service in the area. Upon opening it replaced a temporary platform.

=== Routes ===
Grand River Transit bus routes serving the station as of September 2023 are:
No.	Name	Connections / Destinations	Frequency (minutes)	Notes
205	Ottawa iXpress	Mill; Ottawa/Lackner	30 peak; 60 off-peak	Continues as route 204 at Ottawa/Lackner
3	Ottawa South	GRT Strasburg Garage; Mill; Frederick; Queen	15 peak; 30 off-peak; 30 weekends	
22	Laurentian West	Block Line; The Family Centre	30 weekday and Saturday; 60 Sunday	
33	Huron	Block Line	60 weekday	No weekend service
35	Greenbrook	Central Station	30 peak	Peak hours only, no weekend service
