= Grand River Transit =

Transit operator in Waterloo Region, Ontario

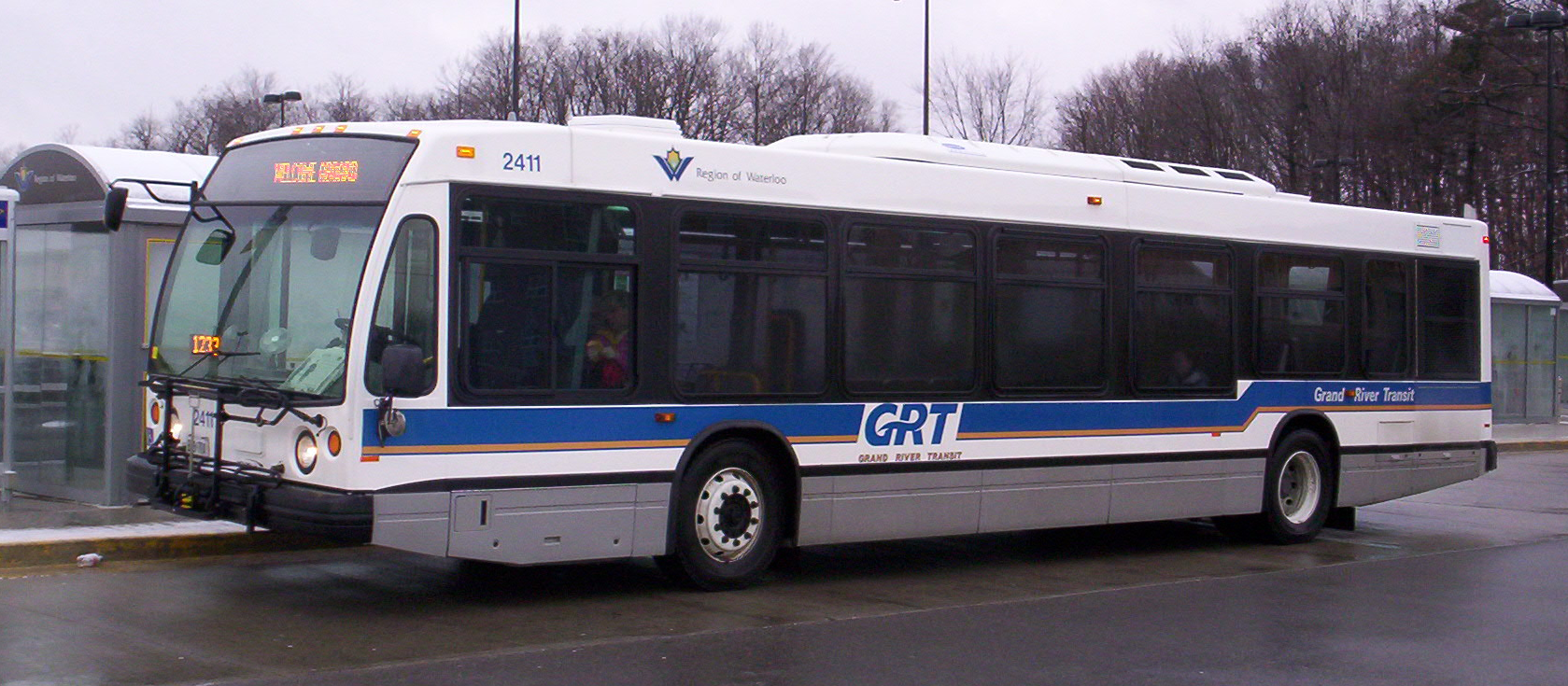

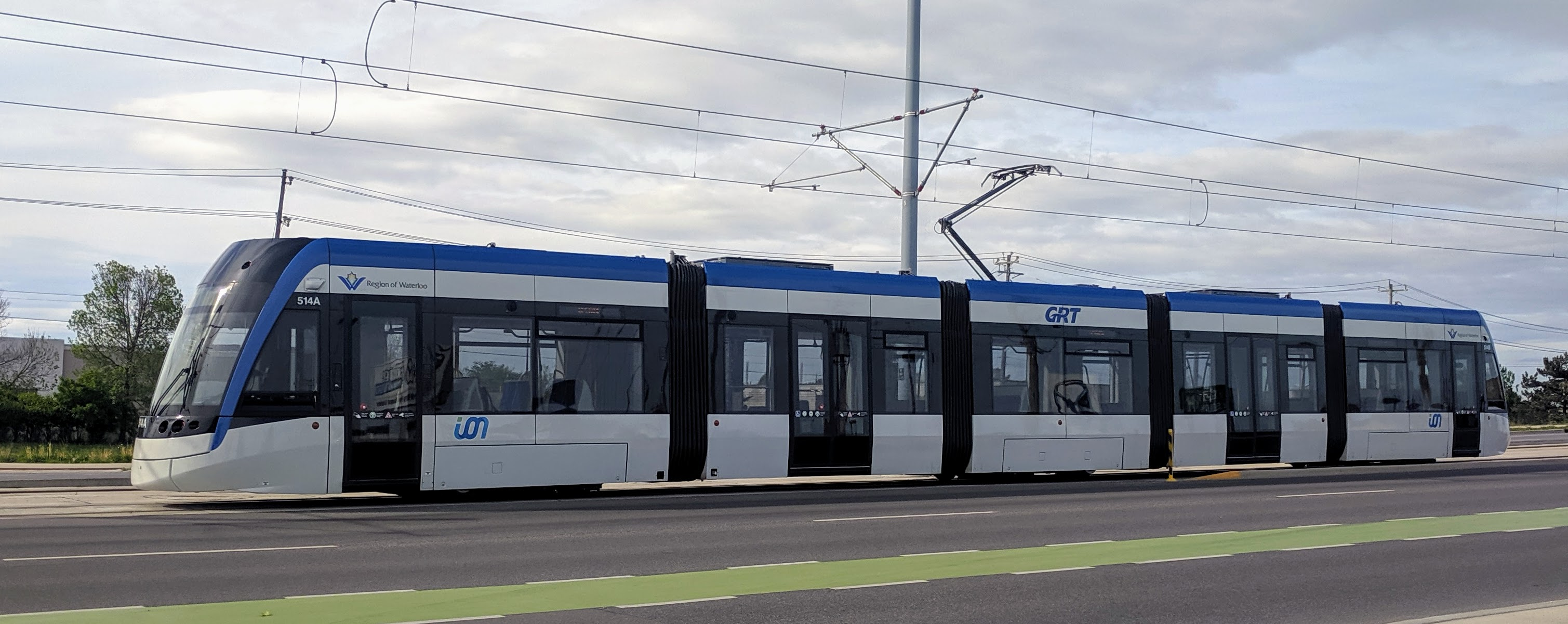
- GRT's fleet consists of low-floor buses such as this Nova LFS, and Flexity Freedom light rail vehicles

Overview
- Owner: Waterloo Region
- Area served: Cambridge, Kitchener, Waterloo, St. Jacobs, Elmira, New Hamburg, Breslau
- Transit type: Bus service; light rail; Paratransit
- Number of lines: 56 bus routes (48 local, 8 express); 1 light rail
- Annual ridership: 26,400,000 (2023)
- Headquarters: 250 Strasburg Road; Kitchener, Ontario; N2E 3M6
- Website: www.grt.ca/en/index.aspx

Operation
- Began operation: 2000; 26 years ago
- Operators: Waterloo Region (buses), GrandLinq (light rail)
- Number of vehicles: 259 buses, 15 light rail vehicles

Grand River Transit (GRT) is the public transport operator for the Regional Municipality of Waterloo, Ontario, Canada. It operates daily bus services in the region, primarily in the cities of Kitchener, Waterloo, and Cambridge, alongside the ION rapid transit light rail system which began service on June 21, 2019.

It was named for the Grand River, which flows through the Region; the name also echoes the Grand River Railway, a former electric railway which served the area in the early twentieth century. GRT is a member of the Canadian Urban Transit Association.

== Overview ==
On January 1, 2000, the Region of Waterloo created GRT by assuming the operations of Kitchener Transit (which also served Waterloo) and Cambridge Transit. By the end of that year, operations had been fully synchronized and buses began running between Cambridge and Kitchener.

Grand River Transit has purchased buses principally from Nova Bus, Orion, and New Flyer, and these now form the entirety of the standard fleet. GRT has bicycle racks on the front of its buses. E-bikes are also allowed on-board Ion trains and buses.

Service to less dense areas is provided by the busPLUS system, large vans which take regular fares on scheduled routes to new neighbourhoods and more remote facilities.

GRT also operates MobilityPLUS, which provides specialized transit for disabled patrons using minibuses equipped with wheelchair lifts.

The GRT fleet consists entirely of motor buses. Kitchener Transit operated trolleybuses earlier in its history, but they were withdrawn from service during the 1970s, well before the systems were merged. GRT continued operating 23 compressed natural gas-driven buses inherited from Kitchener Transit but did not expand this fleet; these buses were retired before the end of 2009. Until the 1950s, the area was served by electric passenger and freight trains run by the Grand River Railway, which even earlier in the 20th century had run streetcars on city streets before the separated railway lines were built.

Since September 1, 2007, all undergraduate students at the University of Waterloo have purchased a non-refundable four-month U-Pass as part of their tuition fees for less than a quarter of the equivalent adult monthly pass. Graduate students in full-time studies are also enrolled in the U-Pass program. Wilfred Laurier University also participates in the program, as does Conestoga College.

Grand River Transit has six diesel-hybrid buses which began service in late August 2008.

With the launch of Ion rapid transit in June 2019, GRT's bus services were substantially reorganized. The greatest effect was in decentralizing the network in Kitchener–Waterloo by no longer using the Charles Street terminal as a service hub; the affected routes now connect with Ion trains at their stations, forming a centralized spine.

== History ==
Public transit in the Grand River area began with private operators and slowly gave way to municipal run service. Interurban and streetcar service were the earlier modes and by the mid-20th century, bus transit became the norm.

=== Kitchener–Waterloo ===
- Berlin Gas Company 1888–1894; horsecar
- Berlin Street Railway 1894–1906; electric car
- Berlin and Bridgeport Railway Company 1904–1906
- Berlin Public Utilities Commission 1906–1916
- Kitchener Public Utilities Commission 1916–1973; operated streetcars, buses and trolley cars
- Kitchener Transit 1973–2000
- Grand River Transit 2000–present
- Ion light rail 2019–present

=== Cambridge ===
Public transit was provided to Galt and Preston before Cambridge was formed.

- Grand River Railway Company 1919–1957; bus and interurban electric service
- Galt, Preston City and Suburban Transit Co. 1921–1929; transit bus service
- Dominion Power and Transmission Company 1929–?; transit and interurban bus service
- Canada Coach Lines 1950–1962; transit bus service
- Galt Public Service Commission 1962–1973; transit bus service
- Cambridge Transit 1973–2000; transit bus service
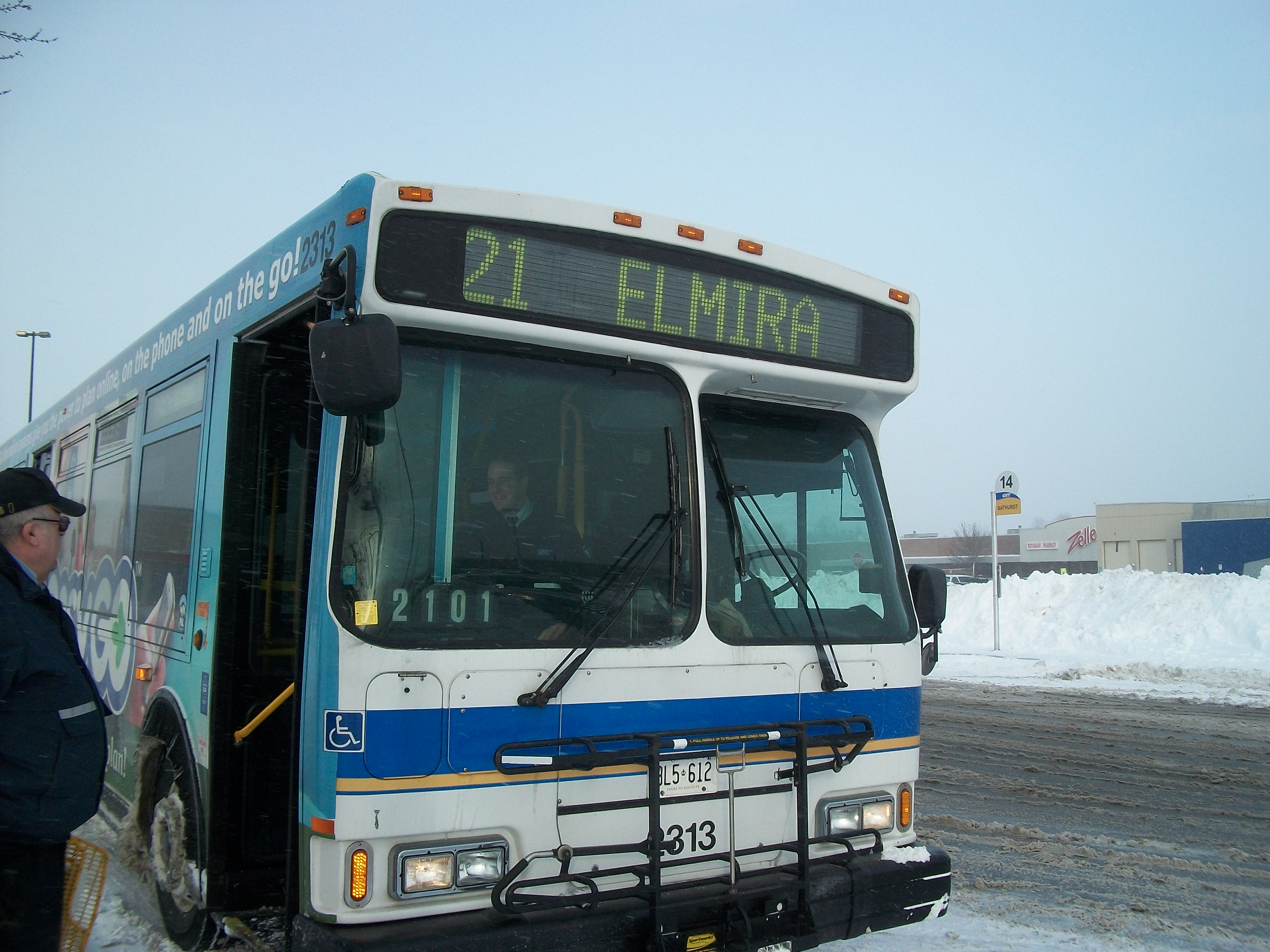
  An older GRT bus on the 21 Elmira Route at Conestoga Station

=== Elmira ===
Elmira had bus service to Kitchener that ended in 1997. Route 21 now travels to Elmira from Conestoga Mall in north Waterloo. Riders can then transfer to another bus to get to Kitchener.

- Elmira-Kitchener Bus Lines 1922–1929
- Lishman Coach Lines Limited 1929–1979
- United Trails Incorporated 1975–1997

=== New Hamburg ===
On April 25, 2016, Grand River Transit began operating route 77 which connects The Boardwalk and the Wilmot Township (Petersburg, Baden and New Hamburg) during the AM and PM peak periods. This route is a BusPlus route and because of the length of the route, route 77 operates every 75 minutes. GRT is using Voyago (formerly Voyageur Transportation Services) to operate the new route.

The Grand River area also had interurban railway service from 1894 to 1955 by various operators.

=== Breslau ===
As of June 11, 2022, Grand River Transit operates BusPlus service for Breslau, which provides locations in Breslau, including Region of Waterloo International Airport. Connections with route 34 and 204 are also available for those needing a trip to Kitchener, Waterloo or Cambridge.

== Ion rapid transit ==
=== History ===
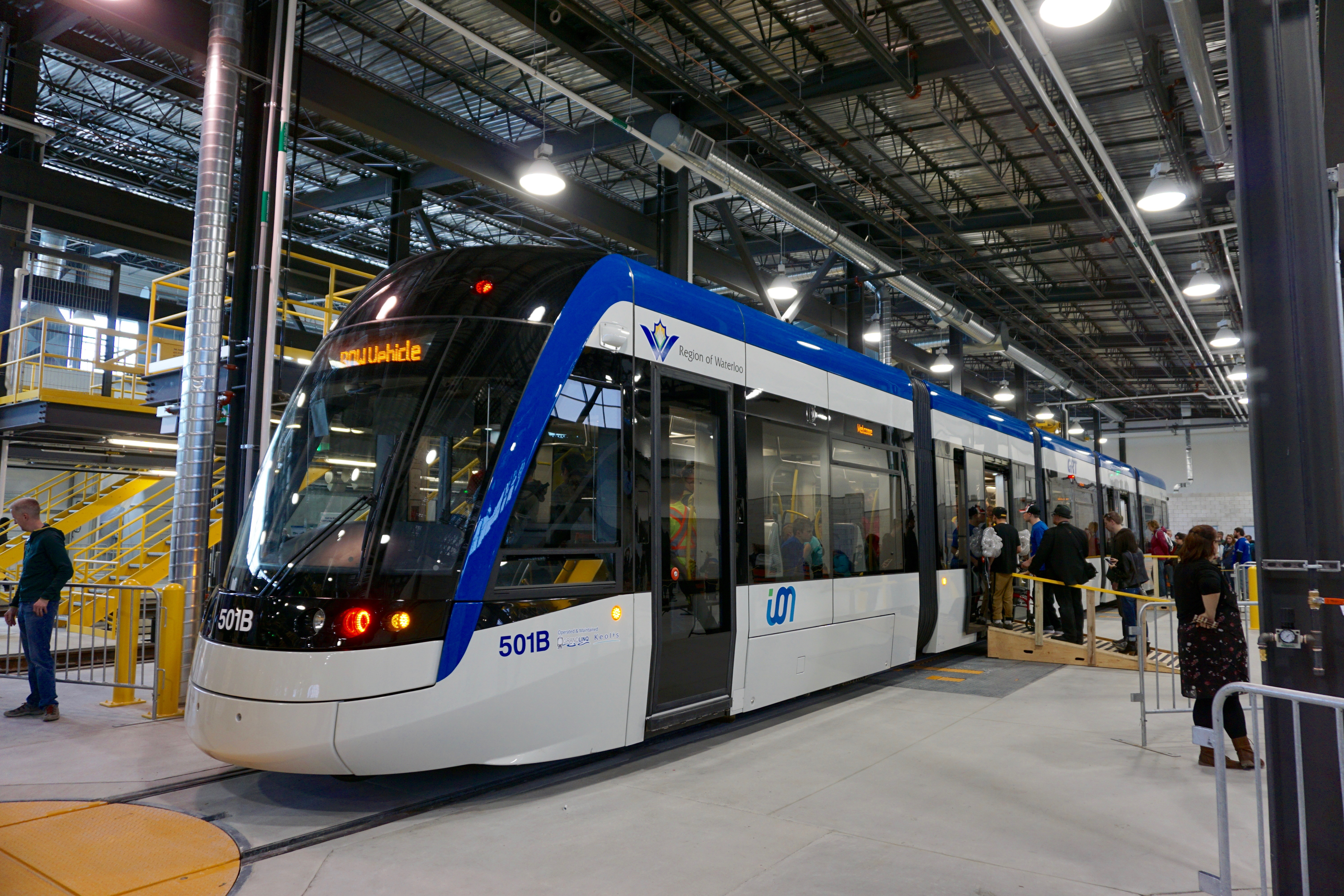
The first light-rail vehicle - a Bombardier Flexity Freedom - on public display in April 2017

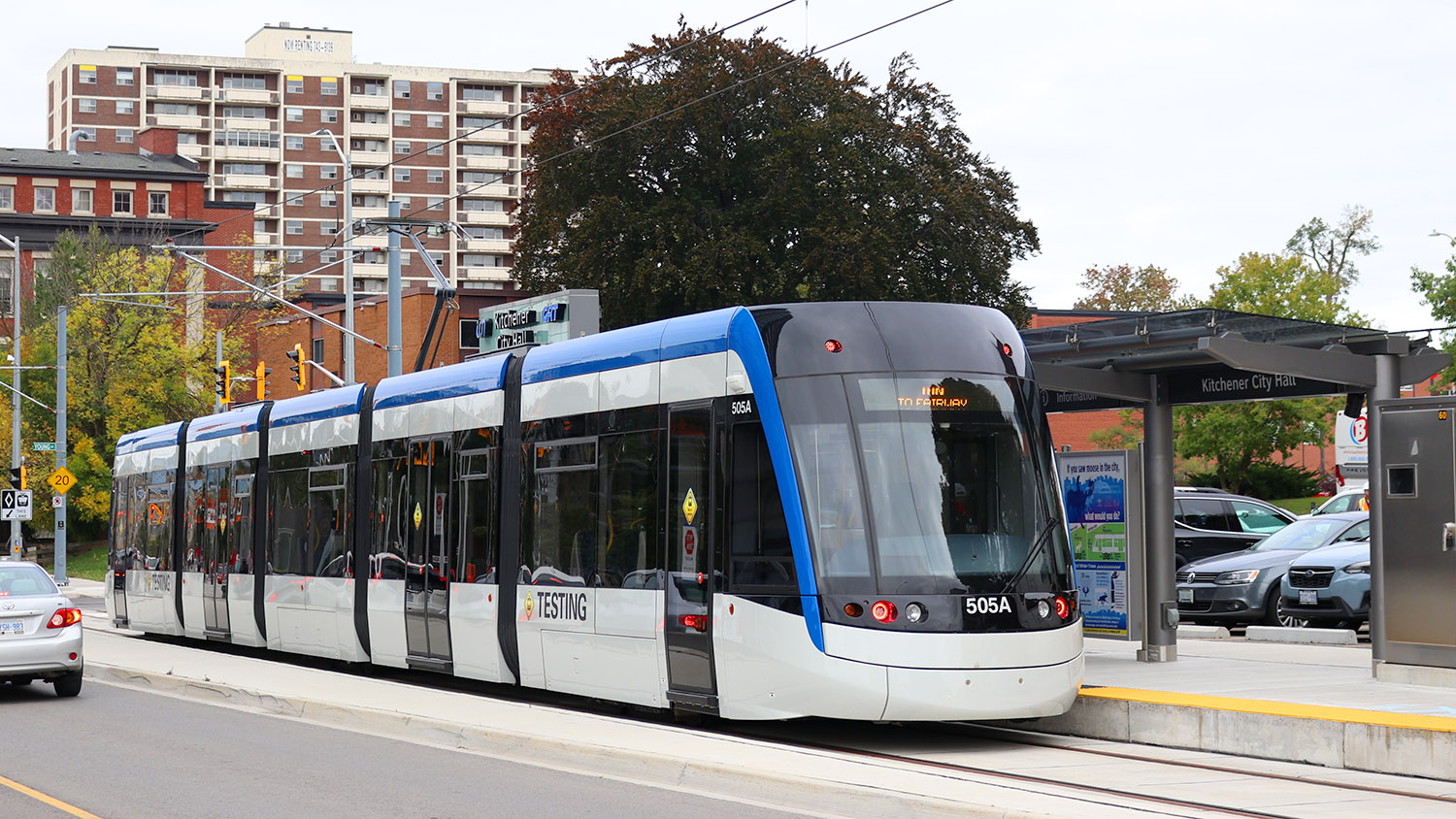
LRT vehicle in line testing in 2018

In June 2011, Waterloo Region council approved a plan for a light rail transit line, powered by electricity, between Conestoga Mall in north Waterloo and Fairview Park Mall in south Kitchener. At first, rapid buses would run from the south end of Kitchener to the "downtown Galt" area of Cambridge but eventually, the LRT would be expanded to that city. (At least one journalist pointed out the similarity between this plan and the electric Grand River Railway system of the early 1900s.) In Stage 1, the Ion rapid transit train runs between Fairway station and Conestoga station by way of the central districts of Kitchener and Waterloo.

Construction on the light rail system, now named Ion, began in August 2014 and the Stage 1 service was expected to begin in 2017. Most of the rails had been installed by the end of 2016; the maintenance facility and all underground utility work had been completed. The start date of service was postponed to early 2018, and then to December 2018, however, because of delays in the manufacture and delivery of the vehicles by Bombardier Transportation. Bombardier was to deliver all 14 vehicles by December 14; that was postponed to December 2017 and then to June 2018. In April 2018, the planned start of Ion service was postponed to December, and was finally accomplished on June 21, 2019.

In late February 2017, plans for the Stage 2 (Cambridge section) of the Ion rail service were still in the very early stage but a proposed route with map had been published. The public consultation process for Cambridge was postponed to 2018.

In early July 2017, Cambridge City Council expressed an objection to parts of the route planned for that city and requested the Region to consider alternatives. At that time, a report indicated that construction of Stage 2 would not begin until 2025. Until LRT service arrives in Cambridge, GRT will offer rapid transit with adapted iXpress buses to Fairway Station using bus-only lanes at Pinebush, Munch and Coronation to minimize slowdowns at times of heavy traffic. Following Ion launch in Kitchener–Waterloo GRT continued the remainder of the iXpress 200 service to the terminal at Fairway Station, numbered as 302.

== iXpress ==
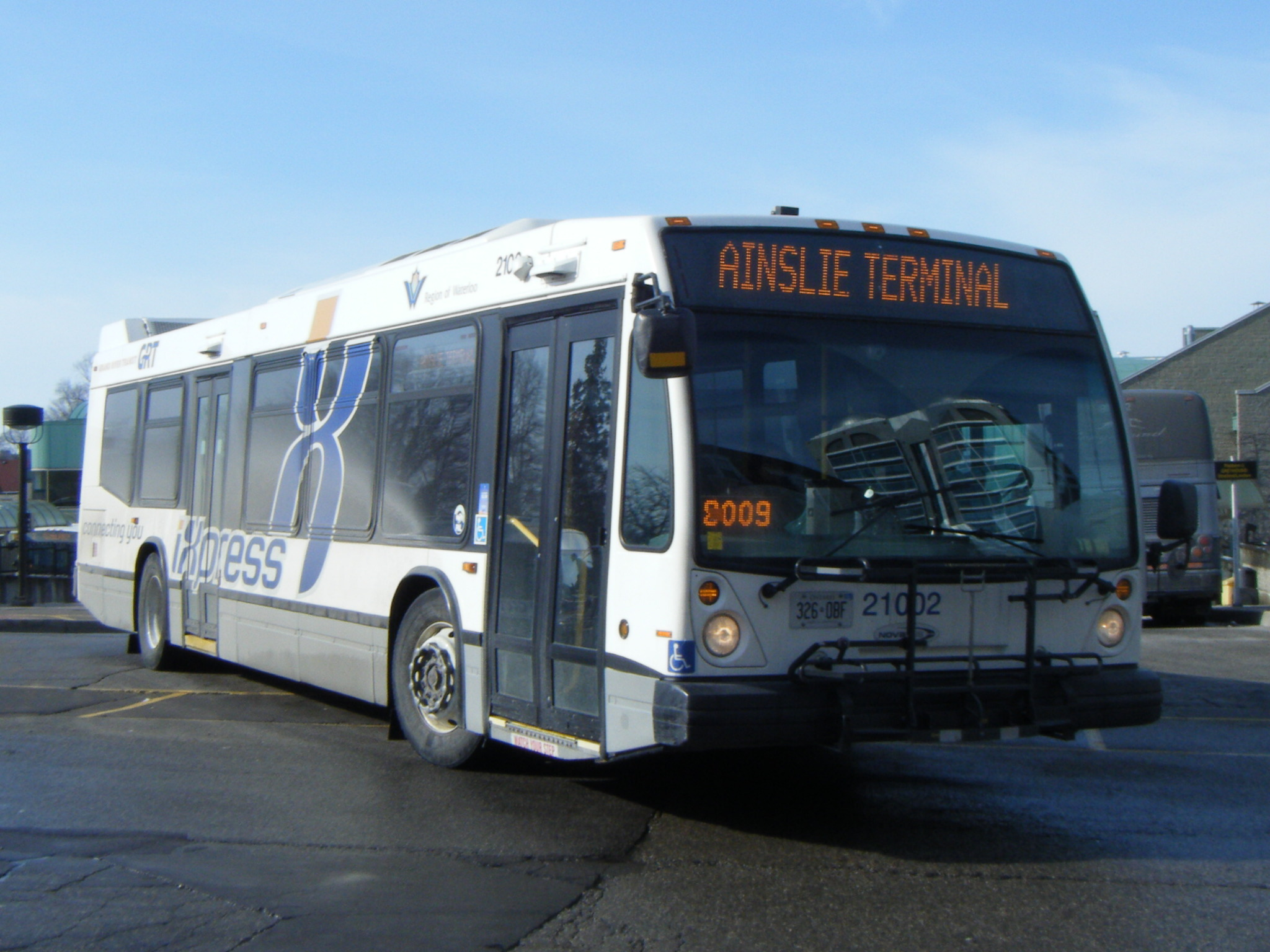
An iXpress bus

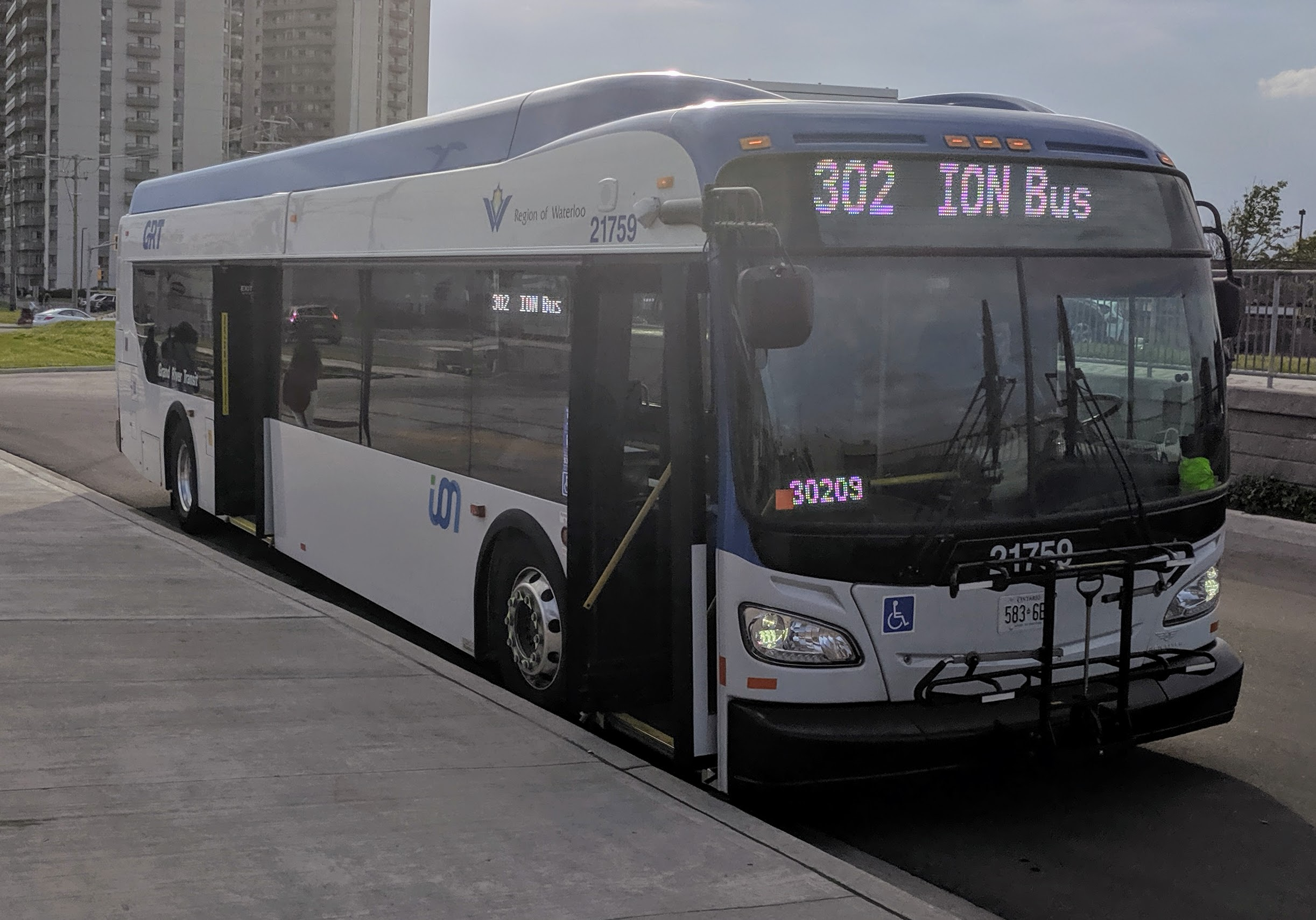
GRT ION bus used on route 302.

The iXpress express bus service is operated by GRT consisting of six routes along major corridors in Kitchener–Waterloo and Cambridge. iXpress began in 2013 with the goals of providing direct routes through high-demand areas, and integrating with the upcoming Ion.

In order to increase ridership across the region and facilitate the expected growing population, the Region of Waterloo unveiled the Regional Transportation Master Plan in 2010, which consisted of seven iXpress-style routes that criss-cross the important secondary corridors along the region (with the proposed light rail serving the Central Transit Corridor), and where they are expecting the most growth to occur. The routes were to be phased in, with the last route being introduced in 2015. The plan was eventually scaled down in order to put more emphasis on the LRT proposal with the Cambridge stubs largely eliminated, and the timeline was also spread out, with all routes expected to be implemented by 2018.

There were different naming proposals for the new iXpress routes. During the public consultations in March 2011, the proposal was to name each iXpress route after a colour, with the letter X at the back. For example, Fischer-Hallman iXpress would be named Blue X, and the shelter would have blue stickers in order to identify each route. However, the plan was eventually dropped, and GRT decided to stick with the iXpress trademark, with route numbers being added to signify between the different iXpress routes.

The first (and now defunct) route, designated route 200 after the expansion of iXpress service, was launched in September 2005 and ran from Conestoga Mall in Waterloo and Ainslie St. Transit Terminal in Cambridge primarily along King Street in Kitchener and Waterloo and Hespeler Road in Cambridge, utilizing a short section of Highway 401. The second route, route 201, runs from Conestoga College Doon Campus in Kitchener to Conestoga Mall in Waterloo, primarily along Fischer-Hallman Road in both cities. The third, route 202, runs in a crosstown fashion through Waterloo, primarily along University Avenue, between the Boardwalk shopping centre and Conestoga Mall. The fourth iXpress route, route 203, opened on April 28, 2014. It runs from Cambridge Centre to Sportsworld Terminal. An extension of the 203 to Conestoga College is made during the AM and PM peak periods when classes are in session. The fifth iXpress route, route 204, began service in September 2015. The 204 iXpress runs from Ottawa and Lackner to the Boardwalk via Victoria Street, Highland Road, Ira Needles Boulevard and Downtown Kitchener. The 205 Ottawa iXpress opened on April 30, 2018, which primarily served northern Ottawa Street. and the 206 Coronation iXpress launched September 2, 2019, partially replacing route 52. The 200 was replaced upon the launch of Ion service by routes 301 and 302.

In March 2018, nine new Ion buses were unveiled. They operate from Fairway Station in Kitchener to the Ainslie Street terminal in Cambridge. These vehicles offer new features, such as more comfortable, high-back seats, free Wi-Fi and USB charging ports.

== Fares ==
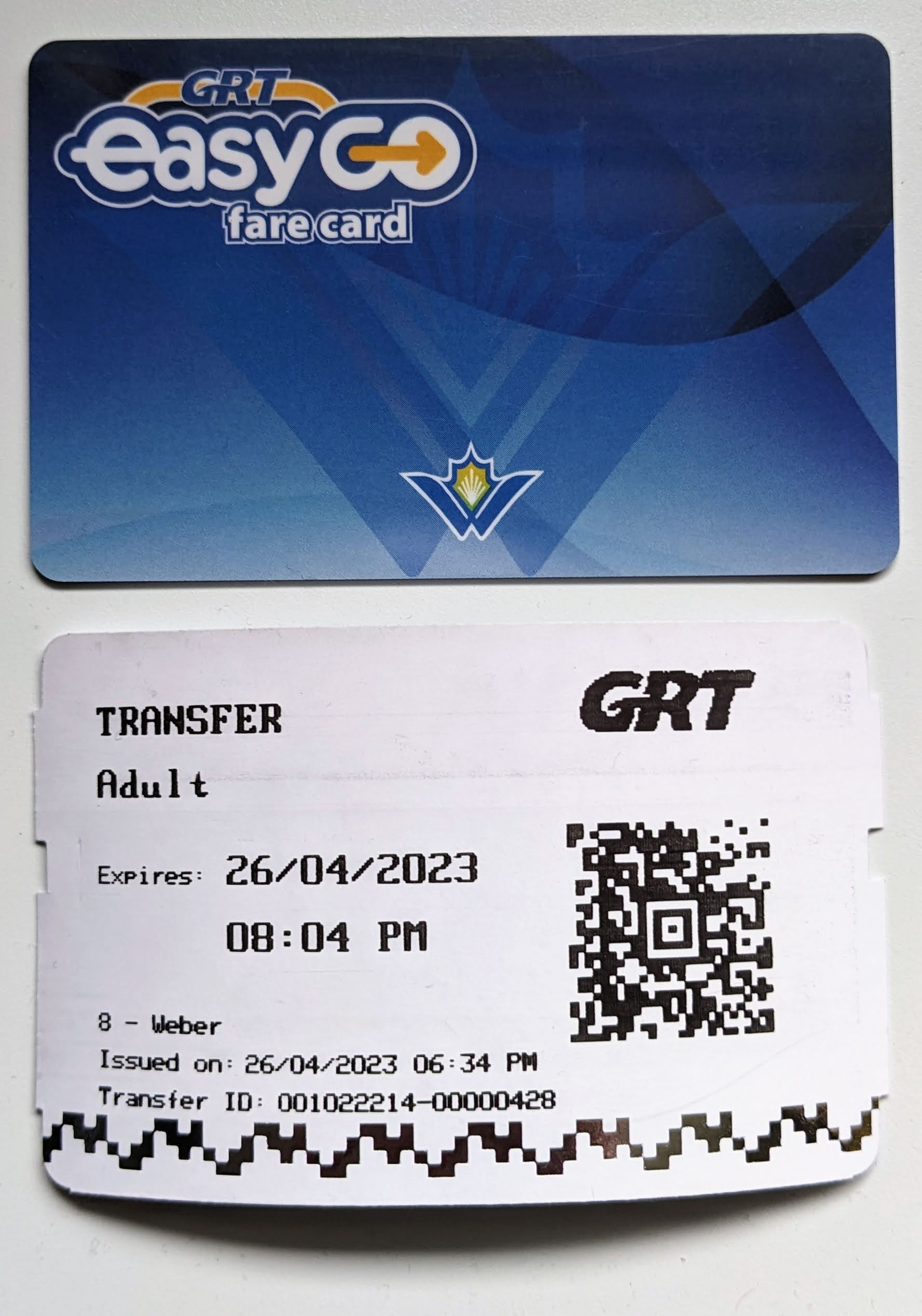
Fare media used on Grand River Transit

Buses and Ion fare machines accept cash and the EasyGo smart card; unlimited transfers are available for 120 minutes of travel following payment of a single-use fare. Monthly passes or a stored fare balance are loaded on the EasyGo card; this can be done online, at customer service desks, or at ticket machines. Specialized passes for corporate or school purposes are loaded on specialized smart cards.

The new EasyGO system on electronic fare cards was first made available on March 1, 2019, in anticipation of the Ion light rail launch. At Ion launch, this fully replaced an old system of paper passes (and accompanying photo ID) and paper tickets.

=== Connect-to-GO ===
Beginning March 31, 2023, riders can enrol in Connect-to-GO, which gives riders a rebate to their GRT fare when travelling to or from Kitchener station and other GO Transit stations in the Waterloo Region using an EasyGo fare card.

== System routes ==
Routes are listed effective September 2, 2024. The following is a general summary of route services; for details, consult the official website. Routes numbered below 100 are local services, numbers in the 200s are iXpress service with the iXpress brand, and in the 300s are Ion branded routes. Routes marked + use smaller BusPLUS vehicles. All routes, excluding 79 make connections to major transit hubs.

Route		Division	Destinations				Other major transit interchanges	Notes
301	ION	Dutton	N	Conestoga	S	Fairway	Conestoga to Fairway (all Ion stations)	Light rail transit
302	ION Bus	Conestoga	N	Fairway	S	Ainslie	Fairway, Sportsworld, Pinebush, Cambridge Centre, Can-Amera, Delta, Ainslie	Via Hespeler, Hwy 8, Hwy 401
201	Fischer-Hallman	Strasburg	N	Conestoga	S	Conestoga College	Conestoga, University of Waterloo, Block Line, Conestoga College	iXpress route
202	University	Northfield	E	Conestoga	W	The Boardwalk Station	The Boardwalk station, Conestoga	Via University/Erb & Northfield iXpress route
203	Maple Grove	Conestoga	N	Conestoga College	S	Cambridge Centre	Cambridge Centre, Hespeler, Sportsworld	Weekdays only No summer service iXpress route
203	Maple Grove	Conestoga	N	Sportsworld	S	Cambridge Centre	Cambridge Centre, Hespeler, Sportsworld	iXpress route
204	Highland-Victoria	Strasburg	E	Lackner	W	The Boardwalk Station	The Boardwalk station, Frederick, Kitchener City Hall, Central Station	iXpress route
205	Ottawa	Strasburg	E	Lackner	W	Sunrise Centre	Borden, Mill, Sunrise Centre	iXpress route
206	Coronation	Strasburg Conestoga	N	Fairway	S	Southwood	Fairway, Sportsworld, Delta, Ainslie	iXpress route
1	Queen-River	Strasburg	N	The Boardwalk Station	S	Fairway	The Boardwalk Station, Queen, Frederick, Fairway	
3	Ottawa South	Strasburg	E	Frederick	W	Sunrise Centre	Frederick, Queen, Mill, Sunrise Centre	
4	Glasgow-Margaret	Strasburg	E	Frederick	W	The Boardwalk Station	Queen, Frederick, Grand River Hospital, The Boardwalk Station	
5	Erb	Strasburg	E	Waterloo Public Square	W	The Boardwalk Station	The Boardwalk station, Willis Way, Waterloo Public Square	Sundays Only
5	Erb	Strasburg	E	Daniel/Bloomingdale	W	The Boardwalk Station	The Boardwalk station, Willis Way, Waterloo Public Square	West via Bridgeport Road. Extension to Bridgeport East
6	Bridge-Courtland	Northfield	N	Conestoga	S	Fairway	Conestoga, Central Station, Queen, Frederick, Block Line, Fairway	Via Lancaster
7	King	Northfield	N	Conestoga	S	Fairway	Conestoga, Waterloo Public Square, Allen, Grand River Hospital, Central Station, Queen, Frederick, Fairway	
8	Weber	Northfield	N	University/King	S	Fairway	Fairway, Frederick, Central Station	
9	Lakeshore	Northfield	E	Conestoga	W	University of Waterloo	University of Waterloo, Research and Technology, Northfield, Conestoga	
10	Pioneer	Strasburg	N	Fairway	S	Conestoga College	Fairway, Conestoga College	Via Mill Park
10A	Pioneer	Strasburg	N	Fairway	S	Conestoga College	Fairway, Conestoga College	Via Old Carriage Weekdays only
12	Westmount	Northfield Strasburg	N	University/King	S	Fairway	Fairway	Via Bleams
13	Laurelwood	Northfield	E	University of Waterloo	W	The Boardwalk station	University of Waterloo, The Boardwalk station	Via Columbia, Erbsville/Ira needles
14	Bathurst	Northfield	N	Northland/Rupert	S	Conestoga	Conestoga	Rush Hour Only
16	Strasburg-Belmont	Strasburg	N	Waterloo Public Square	S	Conestoga College	Conestoga College, Grand River Hospital, Waterloo Public Square, Willis Way	
19A	Hazel	Northfield	S	University of Waterloo	N	St. Jacobs Market	University of Waterloo, St. Jacobs Market	Via Weber, Parkside
19B	Hazel	Northfield	S	University of Waterloo	N	Northfield Station	University of Waterloo, Northfield Station	Via Weber, Parkside, Randall/Kumpf
20	Victoria-Frederick	Strasburg	E	Stanley Park Mall	W	The Boardwalk station	The Boardwalk station, Central Station, Stanley Park Mall	
21	Elmira	Northfield	N	Arthur/Church (Elmira)	S	Conestoga	Conestoga, St. Jacobs Market	
22	Laurentian West	Strasburg	E	Block Line	W	Sunrise Centre	Block Line, Sunrise Centre	
23	Idlewood	Strasburg	N	Stanley Park Mall	S	Fairway	Fairway, Stanley Park Mall	
26	Trillium	Strasburg	S	Huron Natural Area	N	Block Line	Block Line	
27	Morrison	Strasburg Conestoga	N	Fairway	S	Chicopee Ski Club	Fairway, Chicopee Ski Club	
28	Franklin North	Strasburg	N	Stanley Park Mall	S	Fairway	Fairway, Stanley Park Mall	
29	Keats-University	Northfield	E	Conestoga	W	The Boardwalk Station	The Boardwalk Station, Conestoga	Via Lincoln, Weber
30	Ring Road	Northfield	E	University of Waterloo	W	University of Waterloo station	University of Waterloo	Loops Ring Road clockwise to University of Waterloo station
31	Columbia	Northfield	E	Conestoga Station	W	Columbia/Sundew	Conestoga, University of Waterloo	Via New Bedford
33	Huron	Strasburg	N	Sunrise Centre	S	Blockline	Sunrise Centre, Block Line	
34	Bingemans	Strasburg	E	Victoria/Lackner	W	Central Station	Central Station	
35	Greenbrook	Strasburg	E	Central Station	W	Sunrise Centre station	Central Station, Kitchener Market, Sunrise Centre	
36	Thomas Slee	Strasburg	E	Conestoga College	W	Robert Ferrie/Forest Creek	Conestoga College	
50	Dundas-Myers	Conestoga	N	Cambridge Centre	S	Ainslie	Cambridge Centre, Delta, Ainslie	
51A	Hespeler	Conestoga	S	Ainslie	N	East Hespeler (Guelph/Fisher-Mills)	Ainslie, Cambridge Centre, Pinebush, Hespeler	Via Fisher-Mills
51B	Hespeler	Conestoga	S	Ainslie	N	Silver Heights (Jamieson/Cooper)	Ainslie, Cambridge Centre, Pinebush, Hespeler	Via Winston
53	Franklin	Conestoga	N	Cambridge Centre	S	Ainslie	Ainslie, Cambridge Centre	
53A	Franklin	Conestoga	N	Cambridge Centre	S	Ainslie	Ainslie, Cambridge Centre	Via Dobbie
55	Grand Ridge	Conestoga	N	Ainslie	S	West Galt	Ainslie	Loop route
56	Langs	Conestoga	N	Cambridge Centre	S	Preston High School	Cambridge Centre, Preston High School	
57	Blair	Conestoga	N	Conestoga College	S	Ainslie	Ainslie, Conestoga College	
58	Elgin	Conestoga	S	Ainslie	N	Cambridge Centre	Ainslie, Cambridge Centre	
60	Burnett	Conestoga	W	Cambridge Centre	E	Burnett/Saginaw	Cambridge Centre	Loop route
61	Preston	Conestoga	N	Conestoga College	S	Cambridge Centre	Conestoga College, Cambridge Centre	via Preston, Bishop
62	Speedsville	Conestoga	N	Speedsville Rd	S	Sportsworld	Sportsworld	Loop route via Cherry Blossom, Maple Grove
63	Champlain	Conestoga	W	Ainslie	E	Elgin/Dundas	Ainslie	Loop route
65	Saginaw	Conestoga	W	Cambridge Centre	E	Coulthard/Arthur Fach	Cambridge Centre	
67	Eagle-Pinebush	Conestoga	W	Sportsworld	E	Cambridge Centre	Cambridge Centre, Pinebush, Sportsworld	
76+	Doon Mills	Strasburg	W	Conestoga College	E	Pioneer Park Plaza	Conestoga College	
77+	Wilmot	Strasburg	W	New Hamburg	E	The Boardwalk	The Boardwalk Station	East to New Hamburg via Baden
78	Fountain	Conestoga	N	Region of Waterloo International Airport	S	Sportsworld	Sportsworld, Region of Waterloo International Airport	via Cherry Blossom and Fountain
79 Flex	Breslau	Strasburg	Mainly operating around Breslau, stops depend on booking via app				Victoria at Lackner, Region of Waterloo International Airport, Kitchener station and Kitchener Central Station	On-demand Services, operates Monday to Friday, 6-10 a.m., 2-6 p.m. and 10:45-11:45 p.m, East to locations in and around Breslau
91	Late Night Loop	Strasburg	S	Queen station	N	Weber/Parkside	Queen, Central Station, Grand River Hospital, Waterloo Public Square, University of Waterloo	Operates only Thursday-Saturday nights, midnight-2:30AM

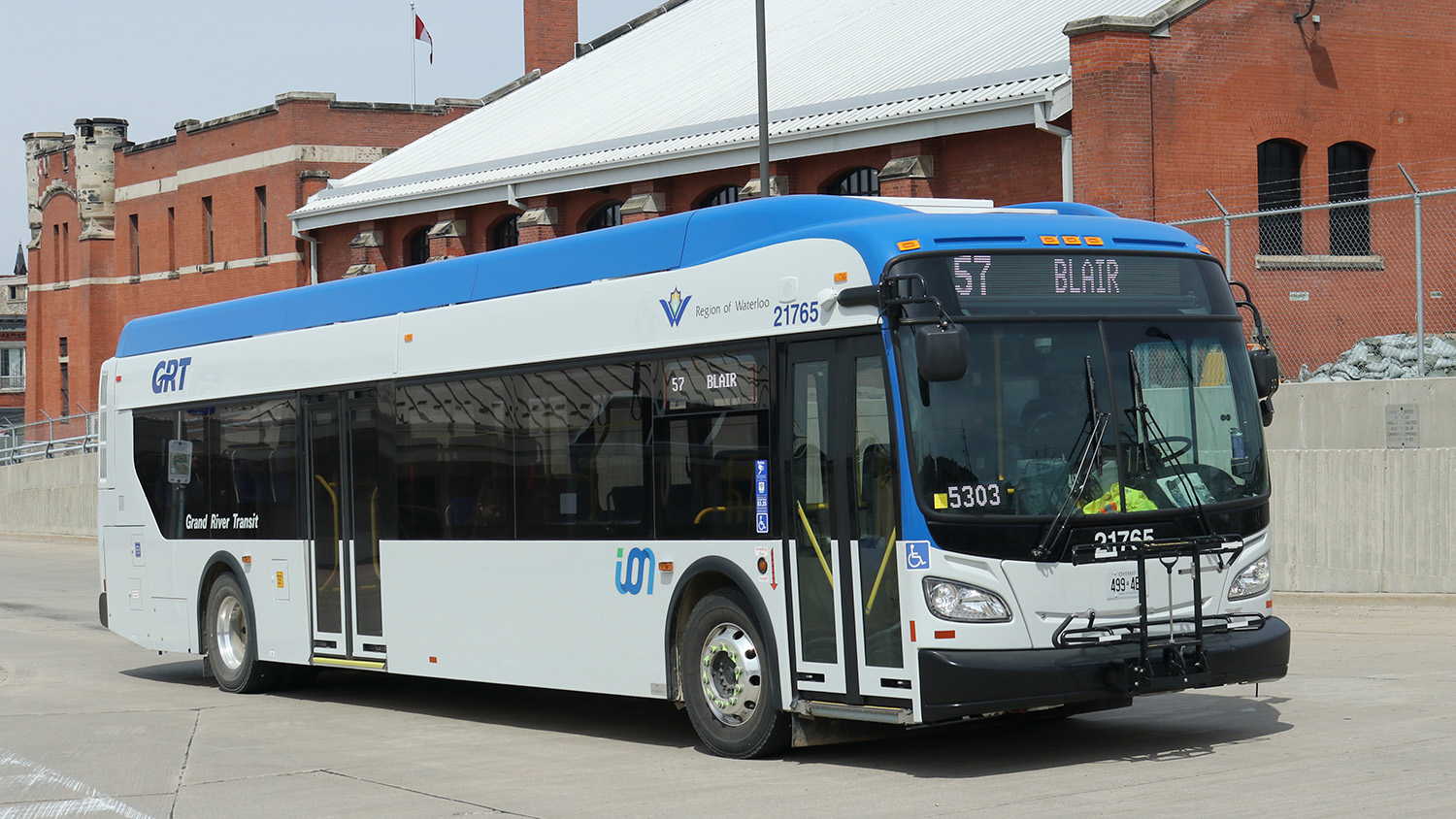
A ION bus used on a local route (57 Blair)

== Vehicle fleet ==
At launch, Grand River Transit's fleet was originally made of busses from Kitchener Transit and Cambridge Transit's fleet, with the later new Nova Bus LFS addition to the fleet. Most of these busses retired in or before 2010.

Today, GRT provides over 250 busses, 35 MobilityPlus vehicles, and 15 LRVS for the Region of Waterloo. GRT's fleet is a mix of 4th gen Nova Bus LFS series, New Flyer Industries (NFI) XD-40 busses, and brand new Vicinity Classic.

ION Light rail uses 15 Bombardier Flexity Freedom light rail vehicles, all of which are stored at the Dutton LRT Maintenance Storage Facility. ION Bus is provided with 9 designated buses, though sometimes ION Bus is provided with the traditional local buses and vice versa.

In 2022, Grand River Transit said that they would replace their old diesel fleet with newer electric and hybrid buses such as the electric and hybrid counterparts of the LFS series.

== Facilities ==
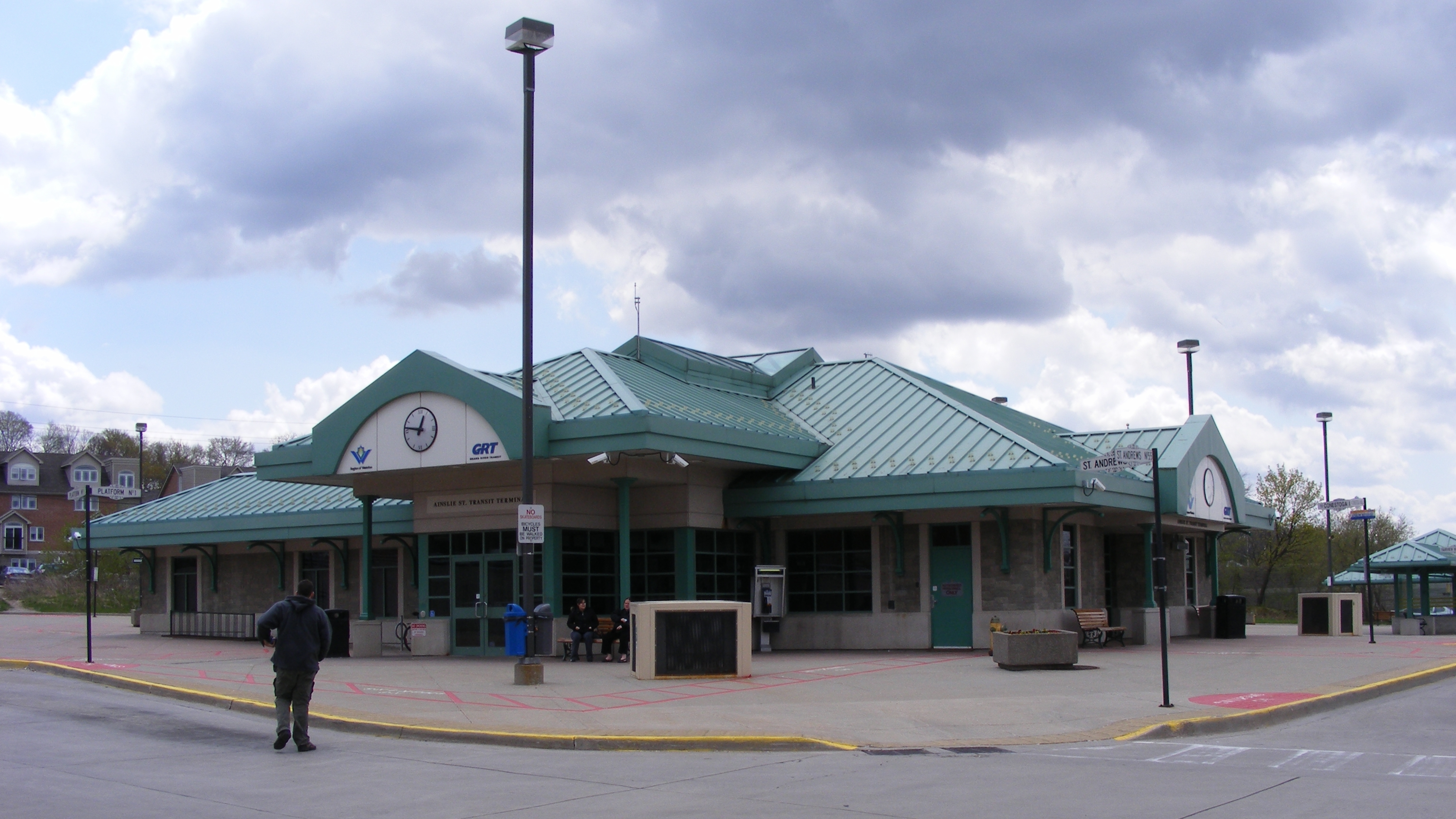
Ainslie St. Transit Terminal, the main Cambridge station

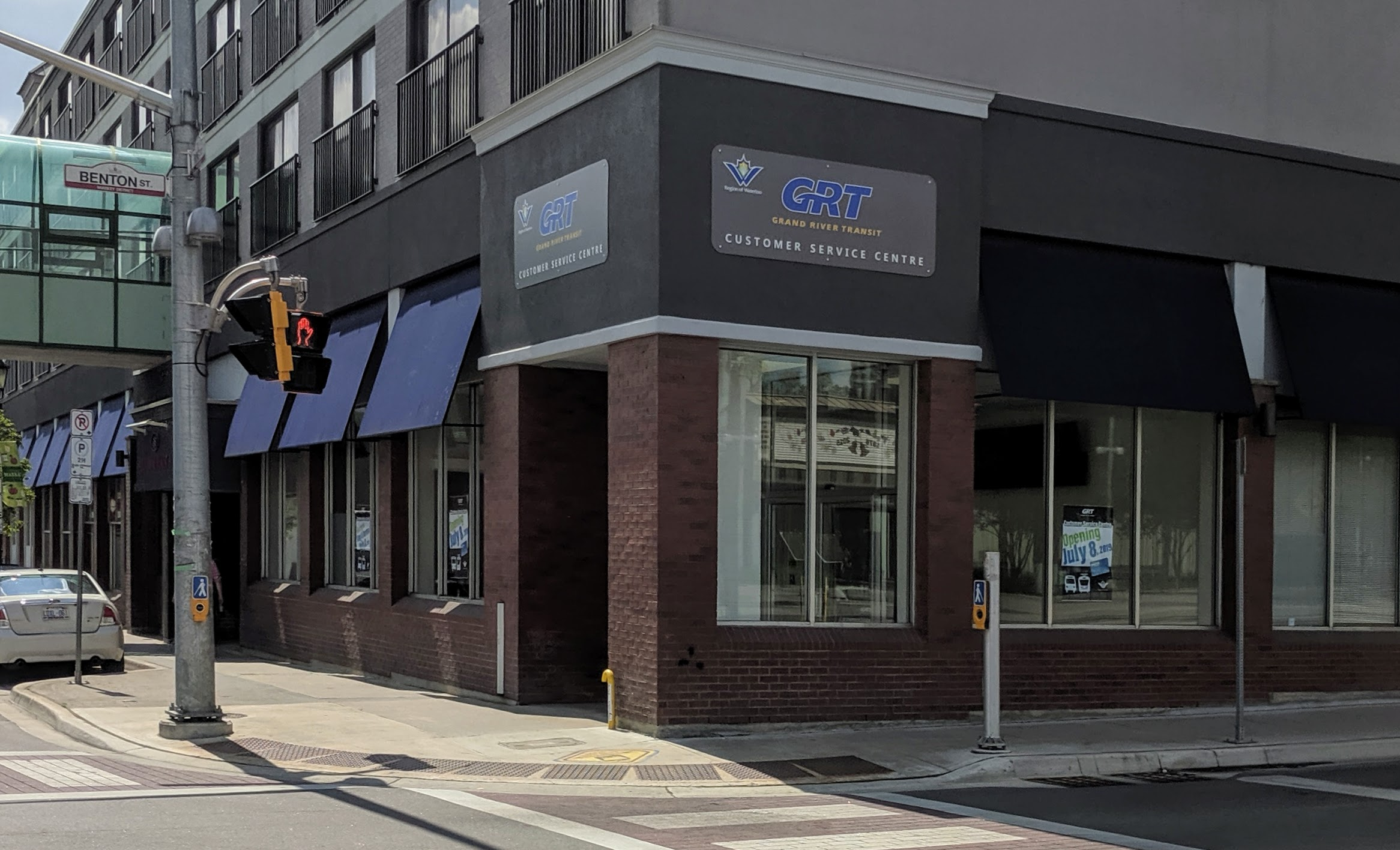
Kitchener customer service centre, at King and Benton streets

One major transit terminal is operated and staffed, the Ainslie St. Transit Terminal at Galt City Centre in Cambridge. In downtown Kitchener, customer service functions come from an office at 105 King Street East, near Frederick station. No GRT services remain at the Charles Street Transit Terminal.

All ION stations have customer help points and ticket machines; most are major transfer points, with Waterloo’s Conestoga Mall, Kitchener’s Fairview Park Mall, and the University of Waterloo station also having off-street bus terminals. Unstaffed off-road satellite terminals are also in place at The Boardwalk Station, Stanley Park Mall, Sportsworld, Sunrise Centre, and Cambridge Centre. An additional terminal at the Conestoga College Doon Campus is planned. Other significant transfer points include King Street/University Avenue, Holiday Inn Drive/Hespeler, Conestoga College-Doon Campus, and the Preston Towne Centre.

Grand River Transit has 4 garages:

Garage	Opened	Address	Description	Notes
Strasburg Road Transit Operations Centre	1976	250 Strasburg Road	Storage facility for up to 250 buses	Stores the Kitchener/Central bus fleet
Conestoga Boulevard Transit Operations Centre	1967	460 Conestoga Boulevard	Storage facility for up to 50 buses	Stores the Cambridge/South bus fleet.
Northfield Drive Maintenance facility	2022	300 Northfield Drive	Storage for 200 buses, 25 dedicated repair stations (22 repair bays, 3 inspection bays) and 2 bus wash stations	Stores the Waterloo/North bus fleet
ION LRT Operation Maintenance Storage Facility	2017	518 Dutton Drive	Main yard for ION LRVs.	Stores all ION LRVs. Operated by GrandLinq.
