= Allen station (Waterloo) =

Light rail station in Waterloo, Ontario

Allen
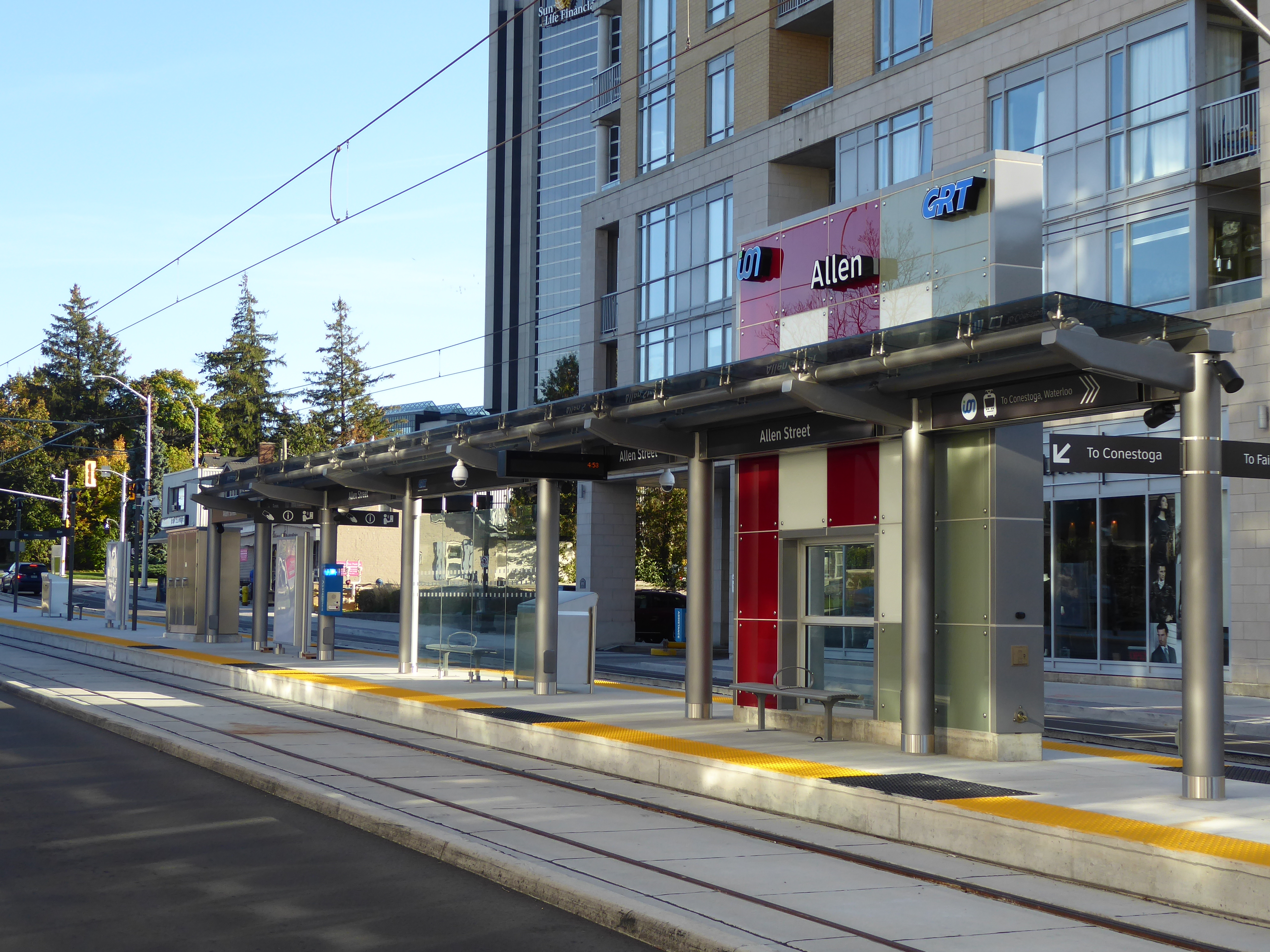
- Station structurally complete, October 2017

General information
- Location: Waterloo, Ontario; Canada
- Coordinates: 43.46015°N 80.51886°W
- Platforms: Centre platform
- Tracks: 2
- Bus routes: 2
- Bus operators: Grand River Transit
- Connections: 7 King; 16 Strasburg-Belmont

Construction
- Accessible: Yes

Other information
- Status: Open

History
- Opened: June 21, 2019

Services
Preceding station	Grand River Transit	Following station
Waterloo Public Square One-way operation	Ion	Grand River Hospital toward Fairway
Willis Way toward Conestoga	Ion	Grand River Hospital toward Fairway
Location

Allen is a stop on the Region of Waterloo's Ion rapid transit system. It is located in the median of King Street in Waterloo, between Allen and John Streets. It opened in 2019.

North of the station, the tracks split bidirectionally, with the northbound track continuing along King Street but the southbound track diverting along Allen to follow Caroline Street. They combine again beyond Erb Street to follow the Waterloo Spur rail line, together northward.

Access to the platform is from the crosswalks, at either Allen Street or John Street.

The station is located directly between two recent condominium developments: 'The Red' to the north, and the 'Bauer Lofts' to the south. Just to the northwest is the 'Circa 1877' condominium. About 200 metres (660 ft) southeast is Sun Life Financial's Waterloo headquarters office tower.

The station's feature wall consists of red, tan, and white glass tiles in a pattern.

Connections to local GRT bus routes 7 and 16 are available immediately to the north of the station, around the intersection of King and Allen. The 301R Ion rail replacement bus uses the same set of stops as well.

== Incident ==
On November 8, 2023, the station platform and an electrical cabinet on it were heavily damaged by a wayward vehicle. There were no injuries.
