= Kitchener City Hall station =

Light rail station in Kitchener, Ontario

Kitchener City Hall
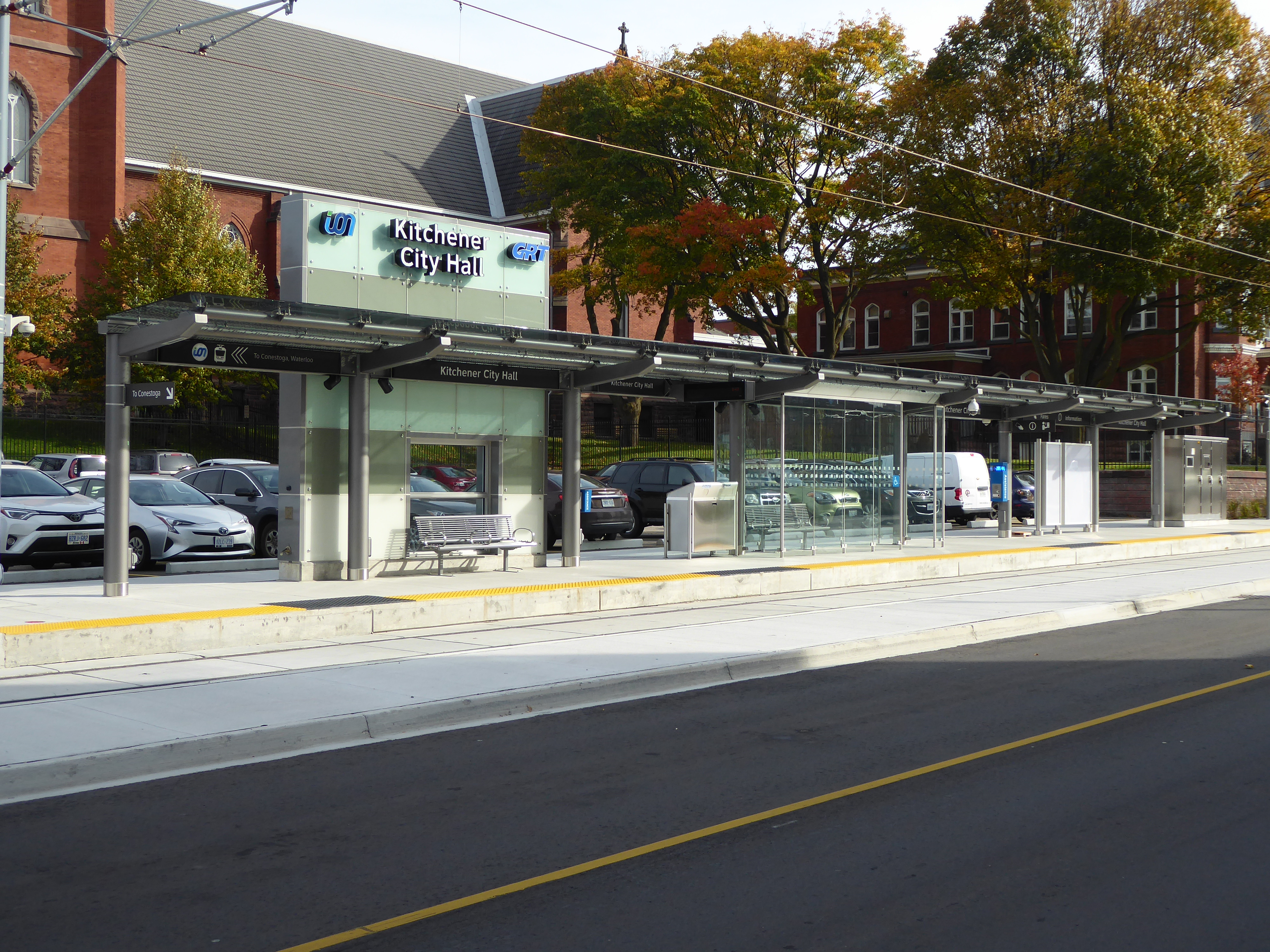
- Station structurally complete, October 2017

General information
- Location: Kitchener, Ontario; Canada
- Coordinates: 43.45202°N 80.49104°W
- Platforms: Side platform
- Tracks: 1
- Connections: 204 iXpress Highland-Victoria; 1 Queen-River; 4 Glasgow-Margaret; 8 Weber

Construction
- Accessible: Yes

Other information
- Status: Open

History
- Opened: June 21, 2019

Services
Preceding station	Grand River Transit	Following station
Central Station toward Conestoga	Ion	Frederick One-way operation
Location

Kitchener City Hall is a stop on the Region of Waterloo's Ion rapid transit system. It is located alongside Duke Street, just east of Young Street, in downtown Kitchener. Just west of the station is its namesake, Kitchener City Hall. It opened in 2019.

The station serves northbound trains only; the nearest southbound platform is at Victoria Park station, about 250 metres (820 ft) away down Young and Gaukel Streets.

The station's feature wall consists of glass tiles in a pattern of alternating horizontal stripes in two shades of green and in white; this mimics the coloration of the office tower of the namesake City Hall.

The platform is connected with Duke Street's sidewalks at either end, and pedestrians passing through walk along the platform.

Locations in the vicinity of the station include Kitchener's main Catholic precinct to the north (including St. Mary's Church and the headquarters of the Waterloo Catholic District School Board); its former St. Jerome's College building to the west now houses Wilfrid Laurier University's Faculty of Social Work. Immediately south of the station is the 'City Centre' condominium development.
