= Willis Way station =

Light rail station in Waterloo, Ontario

Willis Way
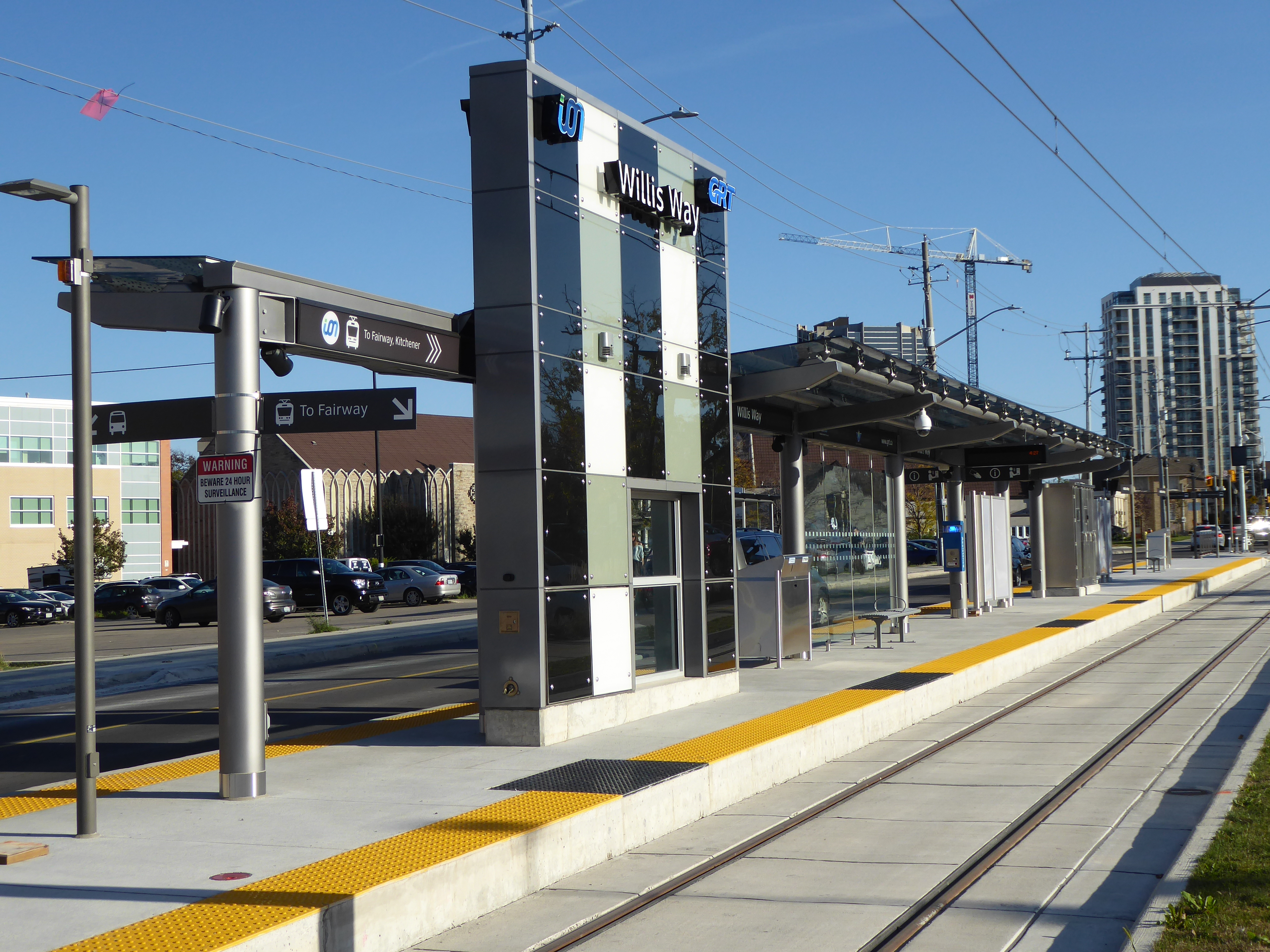
- Station structurally complete, October 2017

General information
- Location: Waterloo, Ontario; Canada
- Coordinates: 43.46228°N 80.52354°W
- Platforms: 1 centre platform (between track and road)
- Tracks: 1
- Bus routes: 3
- Bus stands: 1
- Bus operators: Grand River Transit
- Connections: 5 Erb; 7 King (peak only); 16 Strasburg-Belmont

Construction
- Cycle facilities: Covered bicycle shelter Bicycle repair station
- Accessible: Yes

Other information
- Status: Open

History
- Opened: June 21, 2019

Services
Preceding station	Grand River Transit	Following station
Laurier–Waterloo Park One-way operation	Ion	Allen toward Fairway
Location

Willis Way is a stop on the Region of Waterloo's Ion rapid transit system. It is located on Caroline Street in Waterloo, at Willis Way. It opened in 2019.

The station serves southbound trains only; the nearest northbound platform is at Waterloo Public Square station, about 200 metres (660 ft) away. Buses passing southbound on Caroline Street are served by the station platform, opposite the rail side.

Access to the platform is from the west side of Caroline only, on the north end of the platform; at the south end there is a crosswalk to access both sides of the road.

The station's feature wall consists of black, grey, and white glass tiles in a pattern.

The station is centrally located in Waterloo's central business district, known as Uptown. Just north of the station is the Shops at Waterloo Square shopping mall; other nearby institutions include the Centre for International Governance Innovation, the Canadian Clay and Glass Gallery, and the Perimeter Institute for Theoretical Physics. In late 2020, a cycling facility including covered parking and a repair station was installed just west of the station.
