= Ainslie St. Transit Terminal =

Bus terminal in Cambridge, Ontario

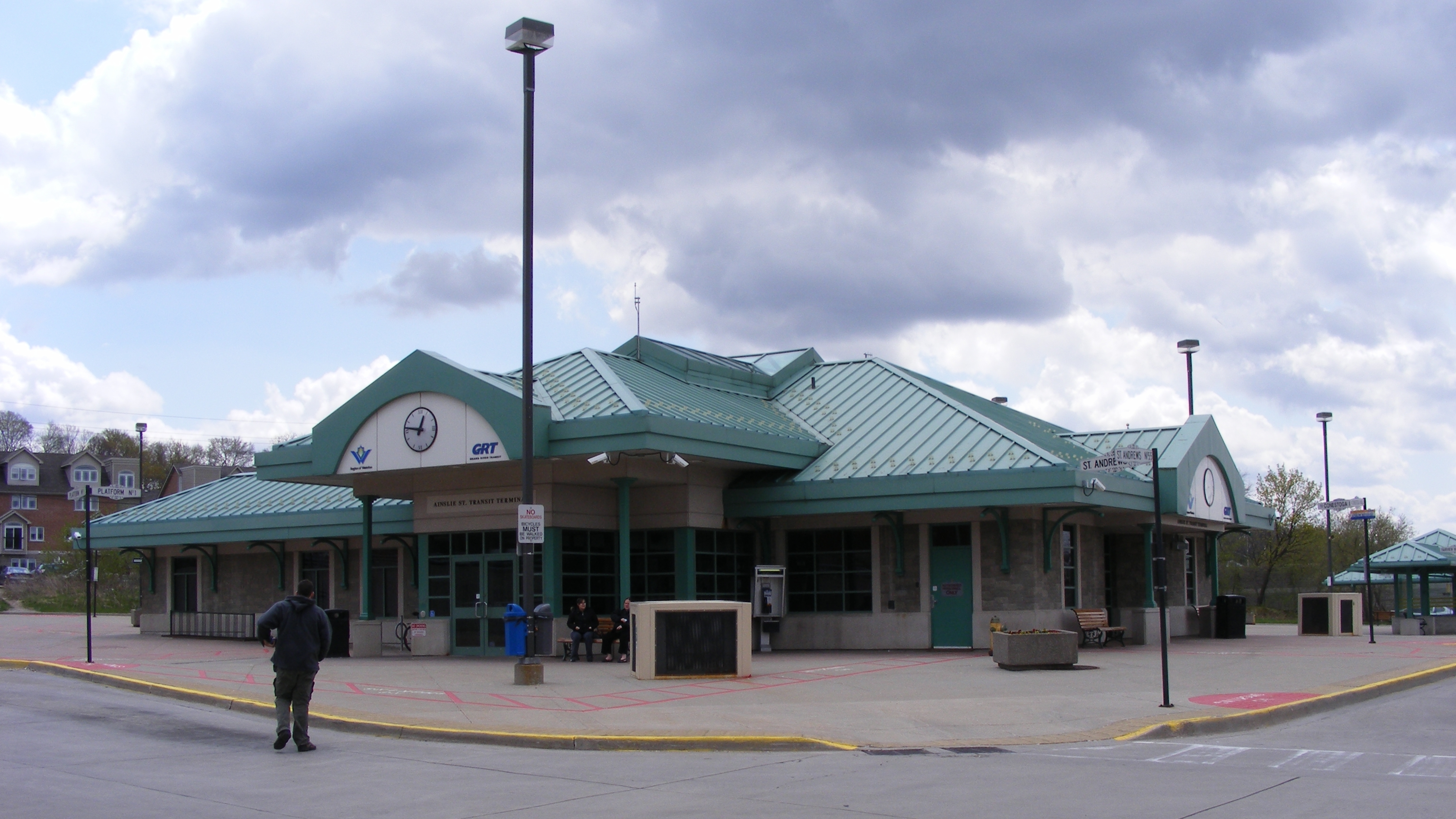

General information
- Location: 35 Ainslie Street South; Cambridge, Ontario; Canada
- Coordinates: 43°21′27″N 80°18′48″W
- Owner: Region of Waterloo
- Operator: Grand River Transit
- Bus routes: 10
- Bus stands: 11
- Bus operators: Grand River Transit; Coach Canada
- Connections: GRT buses: 302 ION Bus; 206 iXpress Coronation; 51 Hespeler; 53 Franklin; 54 Lisbon Pines; 57 Blair; 58 Elmwood; 59 Christopher; 63 Champlain

Construction
- Structure type: Waiting room, washroom, ticket counter
- Cycle facilities: Yes
- Accessible: Yes
Location

The Ainslie St. Transit Terminal is a bus station and terminal in Cambridge, Ontario, Canada. It is located in the core of Galt, a former city which is now a community within Cambridge.

The building is a single-story facility with a waiting room, ticket counter, public washrooms, and vending machines. It is surrounded on all sides by bus platforms, with the only access to and from the surrounding streets by crossing the bus right-of-way.

== History ==
The Ainslie Street Terminal was built as a replacement for the Mill Street Terminal (which was located on Mill Street near Main Street and Ainslie Street) after a 1988 report, commissioned by the City of Cambridge, concluded that the existing facilities were totally inadequate and a replacement terminal should be constructed. This occurred around the same time as the construction of the Charles Street Terminal in the neighbouring city of Kitchener, which replaced an earlier Duke Street Terminal that had also been deemed inadequate.

Local bus services at the terminal were originally operated by Cambridge Transit. In 2000, Cambridge Transit was merged with Kitchener Transit to form Grand River Transit, managed under the Region of Waterloo, as part of a general regionalization of formerly municipal services.

=== Launch of iXpress ===
During the mid-2000s, planners began reorienting regional Grand River Transit service around the concept of a Central Transit Corridor, which was defined generally as the linear urbanized area, much of it following King Street, that comprised the cores of the cities of Kitchener, Waterloo, and Cambridge. The first stage in service improvements on the Central Transit Corridor was an express bus system, branded as iXpress, which was designed as a regional connector to complement existing local bus services which had largely been inherited from Grand River Transit's predecessor agencies. The Ainslie Street Terminal was chosen as the southern terminus for the iXpress service due to the relatively high number of people working in downtown Galt, as well as the high number of local bus routes (at the time, eleven) which stopped at the station.

The area of the Ainslie Street Terminal was chosen specifically by regional planners as a focus for their promotion of the service due to factors relating to its urban environment, such as its relatively strong sidewalk network, a land-use mix which encouraged transportation modes other than driving, and its demographic makeup. With the launch of iXpress in September 2005, a bus trip between the Ainslie Street Terminal and the Conestoga Mall bus terminal in north Waterloo was reduced from 112 minutes with one transfer to a single-seat ride of 71 minutes. Subsequent ridership studies in the late 2000s showed that only 32% of iXpress riders boarding at the Ainslie Street Terminal walked to the station, while 50% transferred from local routes. This indicated a walking rate lower than any iXpress stop in Kitchener or Waterloo, but higher than any other iXpress stop in the city of Cambridge. An analysis of generalized cost indicated a greater generalized travel cost reduction for transit riders along the southern section (Ainslie to Fairview) than the northern (Fairview to Conestoga).

=== Ion rapid transit ===
The next change to the Central Transit Corridor was a two-stage rapid transit plan, beginning with the replacement of the original iXpress route with a combination of light rail transit (LRT) along the northern Conestoga–Fairview section, called the Ion light rail, and adapted bus rapid transit (aBRT) in the southern Ainslie–Fairview section, branded as the Ion Bus; the entire system was branded holistically as Ion rapid transit. With the launch of the Ion system in June 2019, the 200 iXpress route was eliminated, necessitating a linear transfer for riders at Fairway station. Ridership statistics indicated total ridership on the 302 Ion Bus was 9% higher than on the same part of the 200 iXpress route during the same period of the previous year.

== Services ==
As well as being the hub for local Grand River Transit routes within the city of Cambridge and some intercity connections, the Ainslie Street Terminal is the southerly terminus for the Ion Bus adapted bus rapid transit (aBRT) service, which is the spine of the regional transit system and connects with the Ion light rail line at Fairway station in south Kitchener.

=== Grand River Transit ===
==== Summary ====
Type	Routes
rapid transit	302
iXpress	206
Local routes	51 53 54 57 58 59 63

==== Full table ====
Grand River Transit bus routes serving the station as of March 2021 are:
No.	Name	Connections / Destinations	Frequency (minutes)	Notes
302	Bus	Fairway; Sportsworld; Pinebush; Cambridge Centre	10 peak; 15-30 off-peak	Wi-Fi and charging ports are available.
206	Coronation iXpress	Fairway; Sportsworld; Cambridge Memorial Hospital; Delta; Southwood Secondary School	15 peak; 30 off-peak	
51	Hespeler	Delta; Cambridge Centre; Pinebush (Hespeler)	15 weekday; 30 Saturday	Split between 51A and 51B .
53	Franklin	Cambridge Centre	30 weekday	
54	Lisbon Pines		30 weekday; 60 weekend	
55	Grand Ridge	Queens Square	60 (all days)	Loop route.
57	Blair	Blair; Conestoga College; Cambridge; Doon	30 weekday; 60 Saturday	
59	Elmwood	Monsignor Doyle Catholic Secondary School; South Cambridge Shopping Centre (Sundays only)	30 weekday; 60 weekend	One-way loop route.
63	Champlain	South Cambridge Shopping Centre	30 weekday; 60 Saturday	One-way loop route.

=== Coach Canada ===
Daily intercity service to Hamilton, St. Catharines, Niagara Falls, ON and Buffalo, NY.

== Future ==
The Region of Waterloo's Stage 2 Ion rapid transit plan would see light rail service extended through Cambridge to downtown Galt, replacing the Ion Bus. One estimate in 2019 placed the start of construction at no earlier than 2028. The proposed light rail line extension would bypass the Ainslie Street Terminal while travelling along Wellington Street, then terminate at a new "Downtown Cambridge" station on Bruce Street. The stretch of roadway on Bruce Street between Ainslie Street and Water Street North would be used for an on-street bus station, replacing the Ainslie Street Terminal.
