= Grand River Hospital station =

Light rail station in Kitchener, Ontario

Grand River Hospital
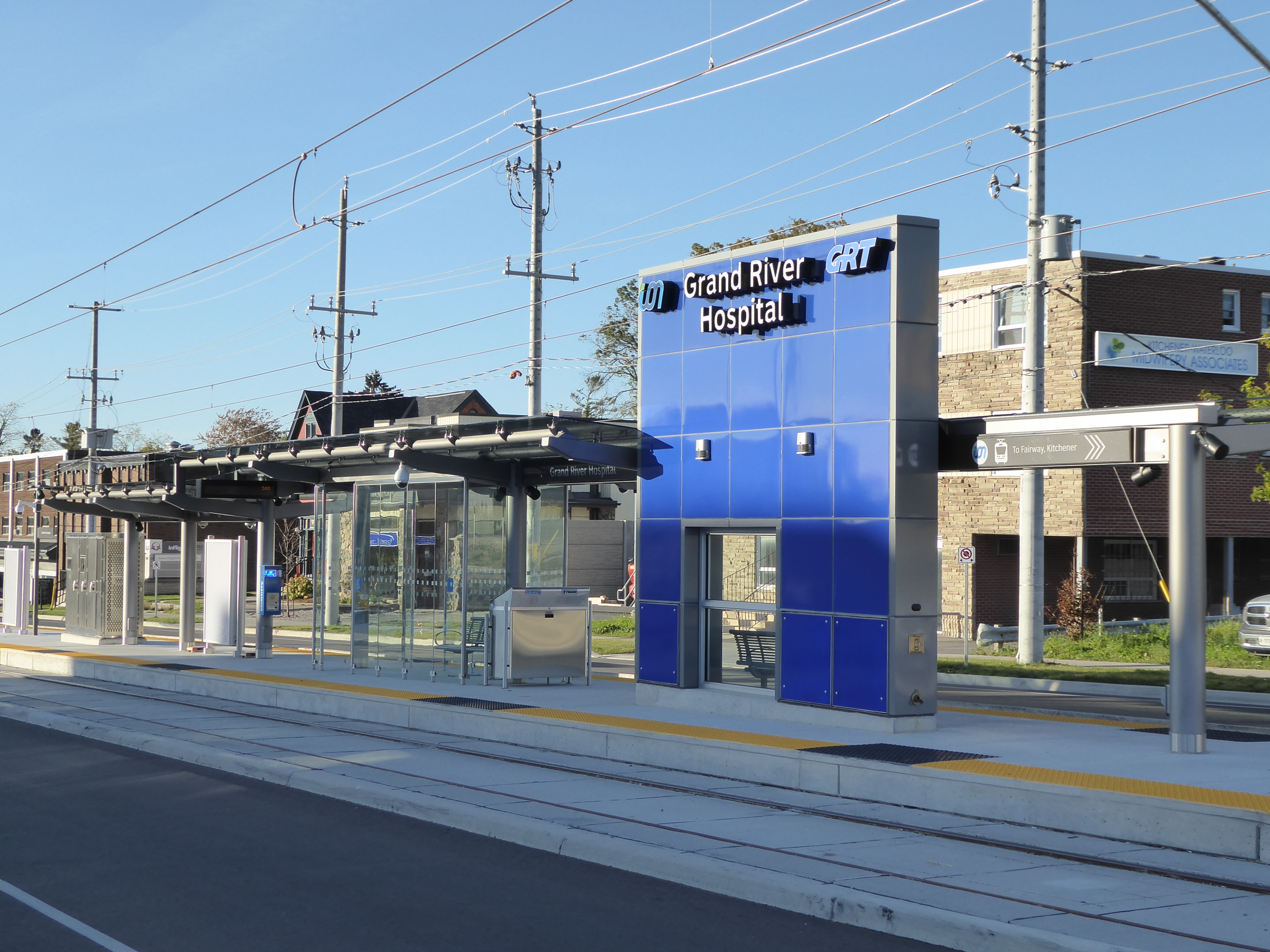
- Station structurally complete, October 2017

General information
- Location: Kitchener, Ontario; Canada
- Coordinates: 43.45730°N 80.51217°W
- Platforms: Centre platform
- Tracks: 2
- Bus routes: 3
- Bus operators: Grand River Transit
- Connections: 4 Glasgow-Margaret; 7 King; 16 Strasburg-Belmont

Construction
- Accessible: Yes

Other information
- Status: Open

History
- Opened: June 21, 2019

Services
Preceding station	Grand River Transit	Following station
Allen toward Conestoga	Ion	Central Station toward Fairway
Location

Grand River Hospital is a stop on the Region of Waterloo's Ion rapid transit system. It is located in the median of King Street in Kitchener, between Pine and Mount Hope Streets, just north of its namesake, the KW Site of Grand River Hospital. It opened in 2019.

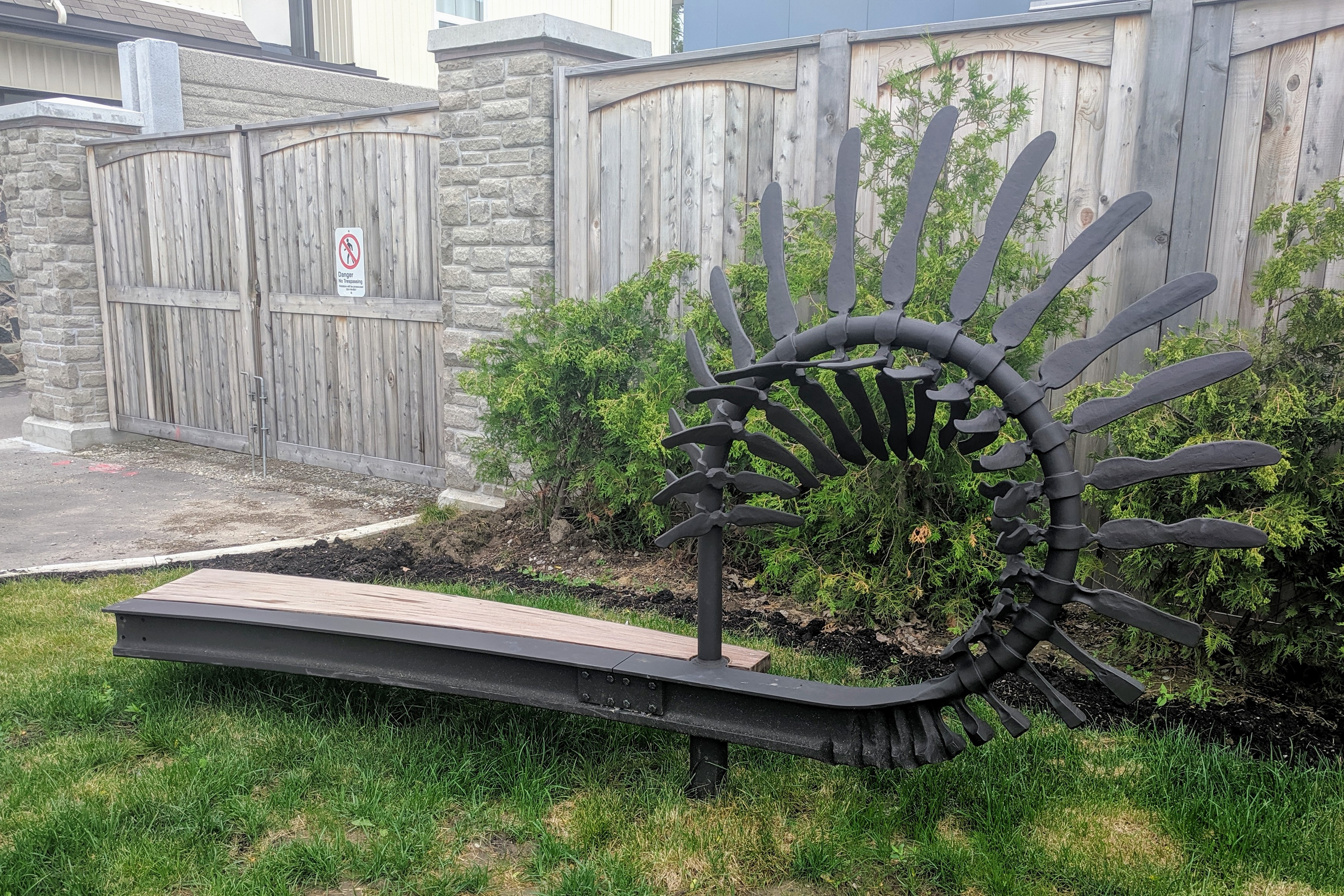
Spinal Column

The station's feature wall consists of ceramic tiles in a solid hospital-blue. The station also features the artwork Spinal Column by Sandra Dunn about the LRT being the backbone of the local economy.

The primary access to the platform is from the crosswalk at Pine Street; secondary accesses at the west end of the platform, crossing either side of King Street, are marked as emergency exits only.

The station is also near Kitchener-Waterloo Collegiate, a major high school. Highrise residential developments to the north of the station have begun construction in the mid-2020s.
