= Waterloo Public Square station =

Light rail station in Waterloo, Ontario

Waterloo Public Square
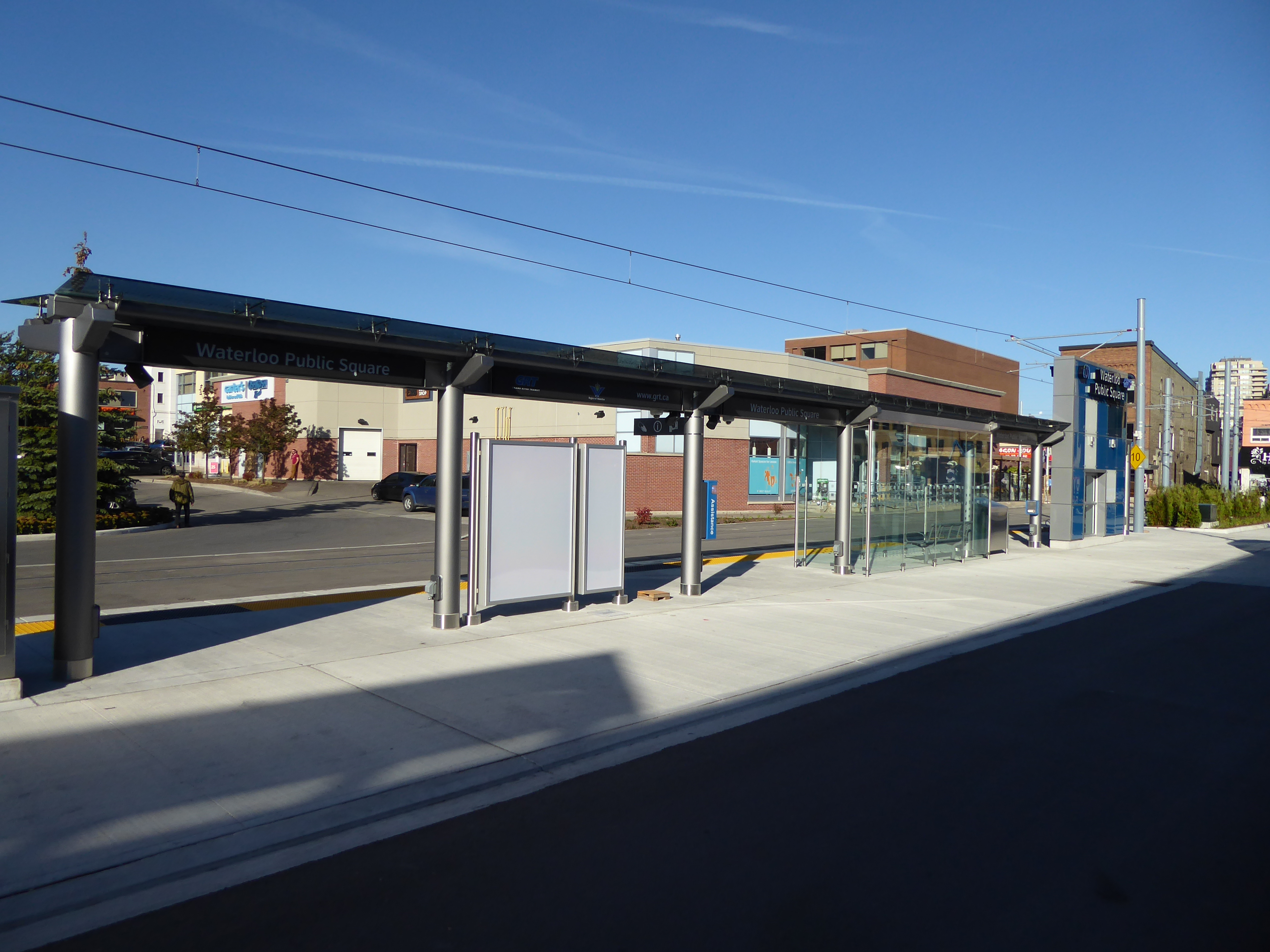
- Station structurally complete, October 2017

General information
- Location: Waterloo, Ontario; Canada
- Coordinates: 43.46414°N 80.52289°W
- Platforms: 1 side platform
- Tracks: 1
- Bus routes: 3
- Bus operators: Grand River Transit
- Connections: 5 Erb; 7 King; 16 Strasburg-Belmont; Laurel Trail / Trans Canada Trail

Construction
- Accessible: Yes

Other information
- Status: Open

History
- Opened: June 21, 2019

Services
Preceding station	Grand River Transit	Following station
Laurier–Waterloo Park toward Conestoga	Ion	Allen One-way operation
Location

Waterloo Public Square is a stop on the Region of Waterloo's Ion rapid transit system. It is located on the Waterloo Spur rail line in Waterloo, between Willis Way and Erb Street at King Street, and at the north end of its namesake, the Waterloo Public Square. It opened in 2019.

Access to the platform is open from the square itself, or from the north side of the mall to the west of the station.

The station serves northbound trains only; the nearest southbound platform is at Willis Way station, about 200 metres (660 ft) away.

The station's feature wall consists of dark blue, light blue, and white glass tiles in a pattern.

The station is centrally located in Waterloo's central business district, known as Uptown. Just south of the station is the Shops at Waterloo Square shopping mall; other nearby institutions include the Centre for International Governance Innovation, the Canadian Clay and Glass Gallery, and the Perimeter Institute for Theoretical Physics.

== History ==
The area around the station has a long history of passenger rail transport. This began in the 1880s with Waterloo's first railway station, which was part of the Grand Trunk Railway system. Much of the Grand Trunk (and later Canadian National) Waterloo station, including the freight warehouse, was gradually demolished after regular passenger service ended in 1934. The final passenger station, built in 1910 and located slightly to the east along the Waterloo Spur, has survived, and today is a heritage structure. Today, Waterloo's primary intercity hub is at University of Waterloo station, which receives intercity GO and Feds Bus service.

As well, the Grand River Railway, an electric interurban system, had its northern terminus in Waterloo, with its southern terminus in Galt (today a part of Cambridge). This service ended in 1938, presaging the overall end of the system's passenger services in 1955.

The Waterloo Central Railway (WCR), a local heritage and tourist railway which began offering regular trips in the area in 2007, once had its southern terminus nearby at a specially-constructed station. With the increase in traffic along the line due to the launch of Ion service, WCR operations were moved north to a new terminus near Northfield station.

== Station layout ==
Waterloo Public Square station sits just south of the point where a street running portion of the Ion tracks has its junction with the Waterloo Spur. The dedicated Ion tracks have a curve to the east before running approximately east-west, with the station's single platform to the south of the tracks. As the station is aligned primarily with the rail corridor and not the street, connecting bus services are available at on-street stops nearby on King Street, the main street in Uptown Waterloo.
