= Kitchener Central Station =

Light rail station in Kitchener, Ontario

Central Station
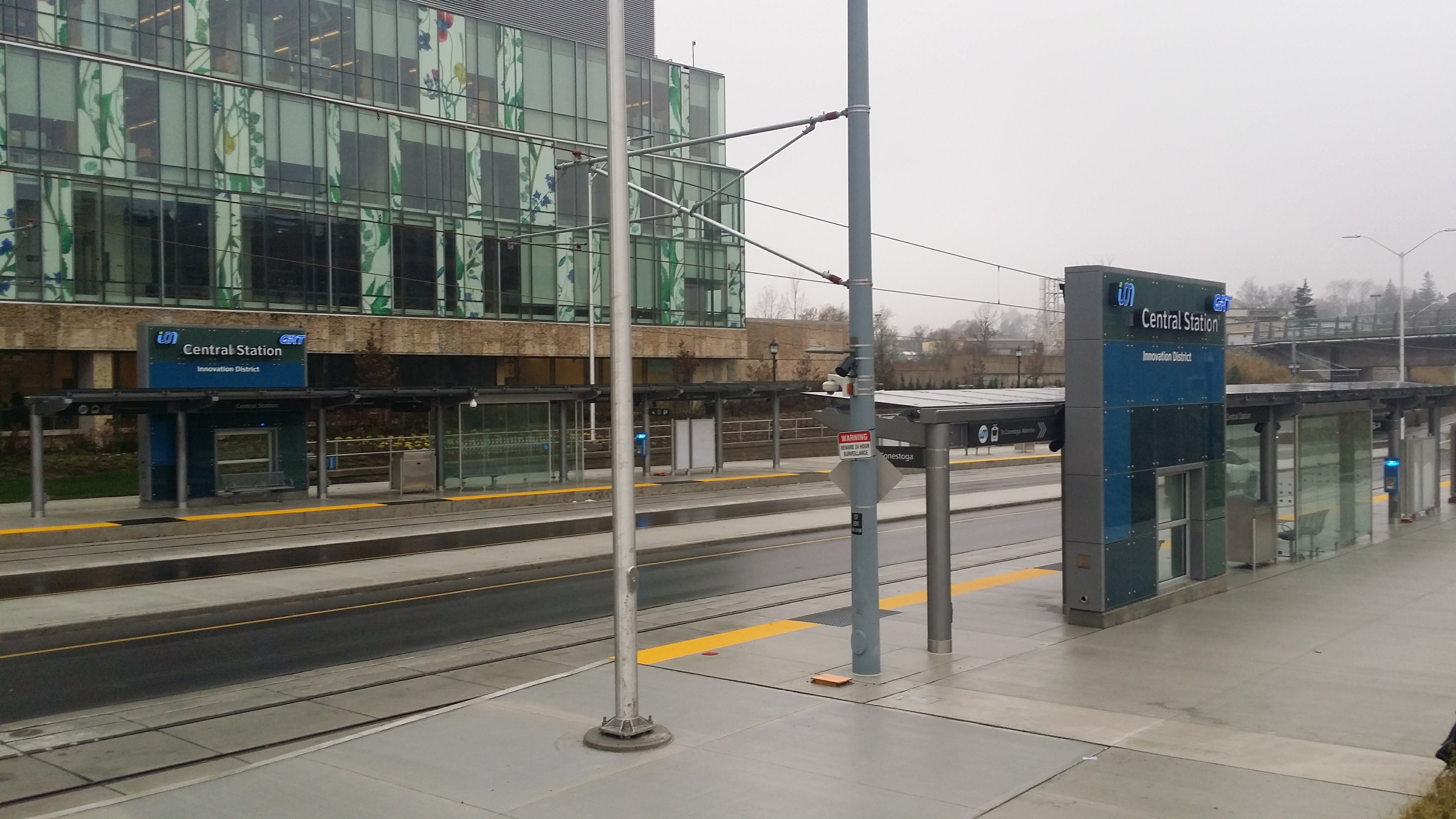
- Central Station Ion platforms

General information
- Location: Kitchener, Ontario; Canada
- Coordinates: 43°27′12″N 80°29′58″W
- Owner: Region of Waterloo
- Platforms: 1 side platform 1 island platform LRT: 2 side platforms
- Tracks: 3 intercity, 2 LRT
- Bus stands: TBD
- Connections: GRT buses: 204 iXpress Highland-Victoria; 6 Bridge-Courtland; 7 King; 8 Weber; 20 Victoria-Frederick; 34 Bingemans; GO Transit buses: 25 Waterloo/Mississauga; 30 Bramalea; FlixBus

Construction
- Accessible: Yes

History
- Opened: June 21, 2019 (LRT only)
- Opening: 2029 (GO & Via)

Services
Preceding station	Grand River Transit	Following station
Grand River Hospital toward Conestoga	Ion	Kitchener City Hall One-way operation
Grand River Hospital toward Conestoga	Ion	Victoria Park toward Fairway
Future services
Preceding station	Via Rail	Following station
Stratford toward Sarnia	Sarnia–Toronto Opening 2029	Guelph toward Toronto
Preceding station	GO Transit	Following station
Stratford Limited service Terminus	Kitchener Opening 2029	Guelph towards Union
Location

Central Station is a light rail station in Kitchener, Ontario, Canada, which is planned to be expanded into an intermodal transit terminal. As of 2021, it consists of an Ion light rail stop and Grand River Transit bus stops. The site is planned to also include a train station served by Via Rail and GO Transit, and an intercity bus terminal.

The station will replace the current Kitchener railway station and partially replace the Charles Street Terminal.

In the vicinity is the University of Waterloo's Health Sciences campus (including its School of Pharmacy), the One Victoria condominium development, and the Kaufman Lofts condominium (occupying the former Kaufman Footwear factory). Just north of the mainline tracks is a former industrial building, the Breithaupt Block, which currently houses offices of Google Canada.

== Ion light rail ==
The light rail (LRT) station opened along with the start of LRT service in 2019.

The LRT platforms are located on either side of King Street in Kitchener, on the north side of Victoria Street. North of the station, the LRT tracks become adjacent through the Moore/Breithaupt intersection and proceed within the median of King beyond, towards Waterloo. South of the station, the tracks split: southbound, they take Victoria to reach Charles Street, which they follow alongside; northbound, they continue along King to Francis Street, which connects them to Duke Street, which they follow alongside.

The platforms are connected with King Street's sidewalks at either end, and pedestrians passing through walk along the platform. The station's feature walls consist of glass tiles in a varying pattern of blues and greys and displays Innovation District under the station's name.

== Intermodal terminal ==
After some public consultation, plans for the "King and Victoria Transit Hub" were made public in November 2020. In addition to integration with the Ion light rail system, the new train and bus station would also feature a connection to the Iron Horse Trail, one of the most-travelled cycling and walking routes in the region, as well as a pedestrian underpass connecting the north and south halves of Waterloo Street, creating more pedestrian routes in the immediate area. The planned two-storey station would have ramps and elevators to reach the railway platform level from the street level. It would also have a publicly bookable community room for local events. The construction of the new station is also listed as a project dependency in Metrolinx's March 2021 preliminary business case for two-way, all-day service on the GO Kitchener line. This is due to the need for a second station platform in order to accommodate two-way service.

Design work on the intermodal terminal was paused in 2021 due to lack of funding, the Region of Waterloo having only secured $43 million out of the project's estimated $106 million cost. However, given that the current train station is inadequate for future GO Transit train service levels, construction is proceeding on certain key elements of the terminal including the train platforms and bus terminal, to enable GO Transit service to be relocated to Kitchener Central station. The Transit Hub construction will begin in 2026, with an opening date planned in 2029.

Since April 7, 2022, Flixbus offers intercity bus service to Toronto. The stop in downtown Kitchener is at 1 Victoria Street South, across from this station.
