= Breslau, Ontario =

Breslau
- Unincorporated community
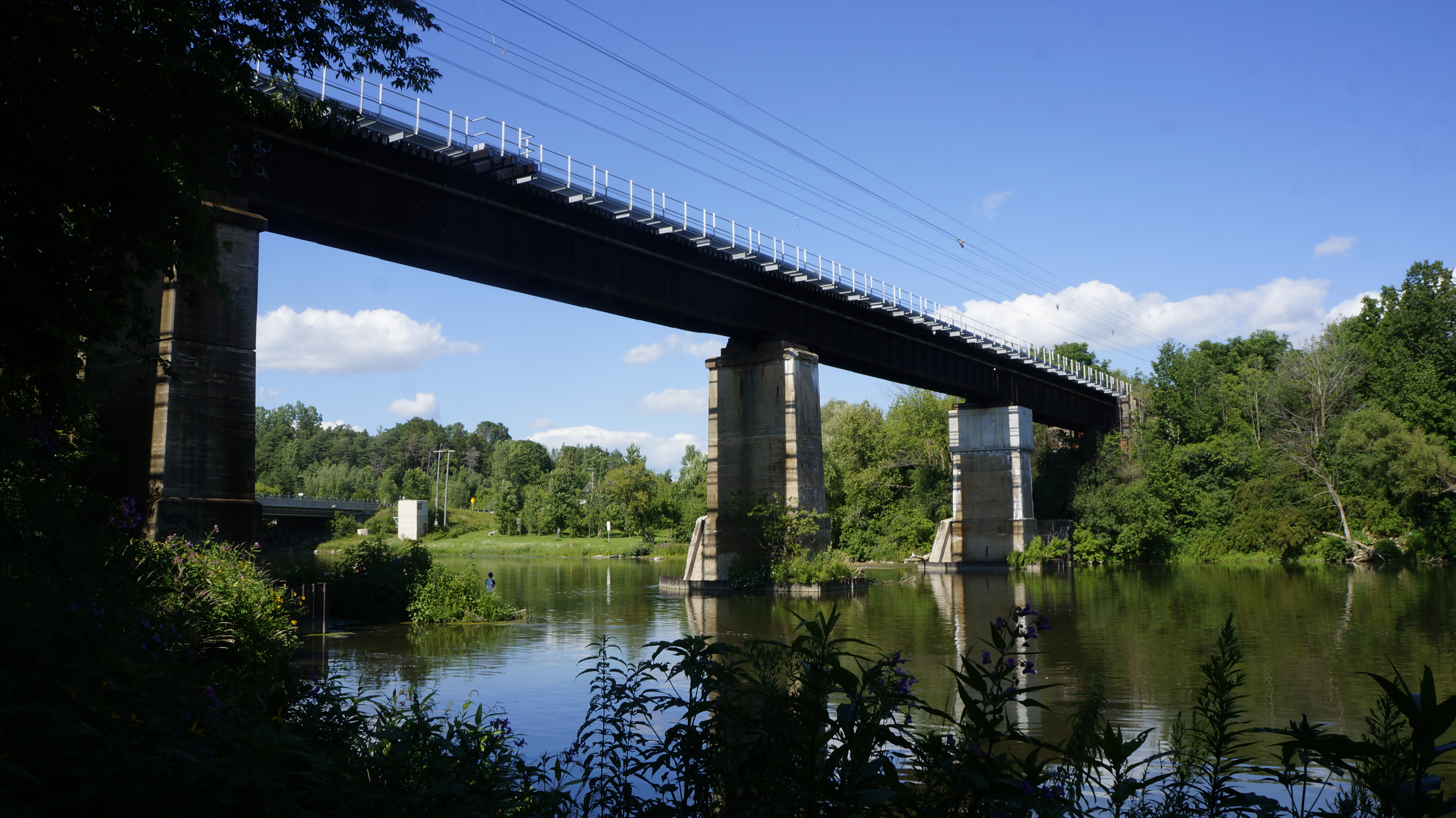
- Breslau Bridge

- Location within Regional Municipality of Waterloo Location within Southern Ontario
- Coordinates: 43°28′31″N 80°24′45″W
- Country: Canada
- Province: Ontario
- Regional municipality: Waterloo
- Township: Woolwich

Area
  - Total: 5.46 km^{2} (2.11 sq mi)

Population (2016)
  - Total: 3,778
  - Density: 691.9/km^{2} (1,792/sq mi)
- Time zone: UTC-5 (EST)
  - Summer (DST): UTC-4 (EDT)
- Forward sortation area: N0B 1M0
- Area codes: 519 and 226
- NTS Map: 40P8 Cambridge
- GNBC Code: FALNO

Breslau /ˈbɹɛzlɑː/ is a community located within the township of Woolwich, part of the Waterloo Regional Municipality in Ontario Canada. Separated from the city of Kitchener by the Grand River, Breslau takes its name from the German name for the city of Wrocław, Poland.

It is located at the junction of Highway 7 and Waterloo Regional Road 17. This routing, although recently bypassed, is the main route between Kitchener and the nearby Region of Waterloo International Airport, located south of the settled area. It is also close to the city of Guelph.

== History ==
The first settlers to the area now called Breslau arrived in 1806, mostly German Mennonite families from Pennsylvania. Settlers included John Brech, Daniel Erb and John Cressman. In the 1820s, members of the Cressman Mennonite Church began congregating in the homes of the early settlers. in 1834, the first meeting house in Waterloo County (built by Benjamin Eby in 1813) was donated to the Breslau congregation and moved to the settlement. In 1850, Joseph Erb built a dam, a sawmill and a grist mill. The village was named after Breslau, the German name for the city of Wrocław, Poland. Breslau was, at the time, the capital city of the Province of Silesia in the Kingdom of Prussia.

A post office was established in 1857 and began receiving mail on a daily basis. By 1864, the settlement had several tradesmen including two blacksmiths, a cooper, wagon maker, a cabinet maker and two mills.

== Demographics ==
In the 2021 Census of Population conducted by Statistics Canada, Breslau had a population of 5,053 living in 1,582 of its 1,635 total private dwellings, a change of 33.7% from its 2016 population of 3,778. With a land area of 5.44 km^{2} (2.10 sq mi), it had a population density of 928.9/km^{2} (2,405.7/sq mi) in 2021.

== Notable people ==
- Tubby Schmalz (1916–1981), Canadian ice hockey administrator, first commissioner of the Ontario Major Junior Hockey League
