= Mill station =

Light rail station in Kitchener, Ontario

Mill
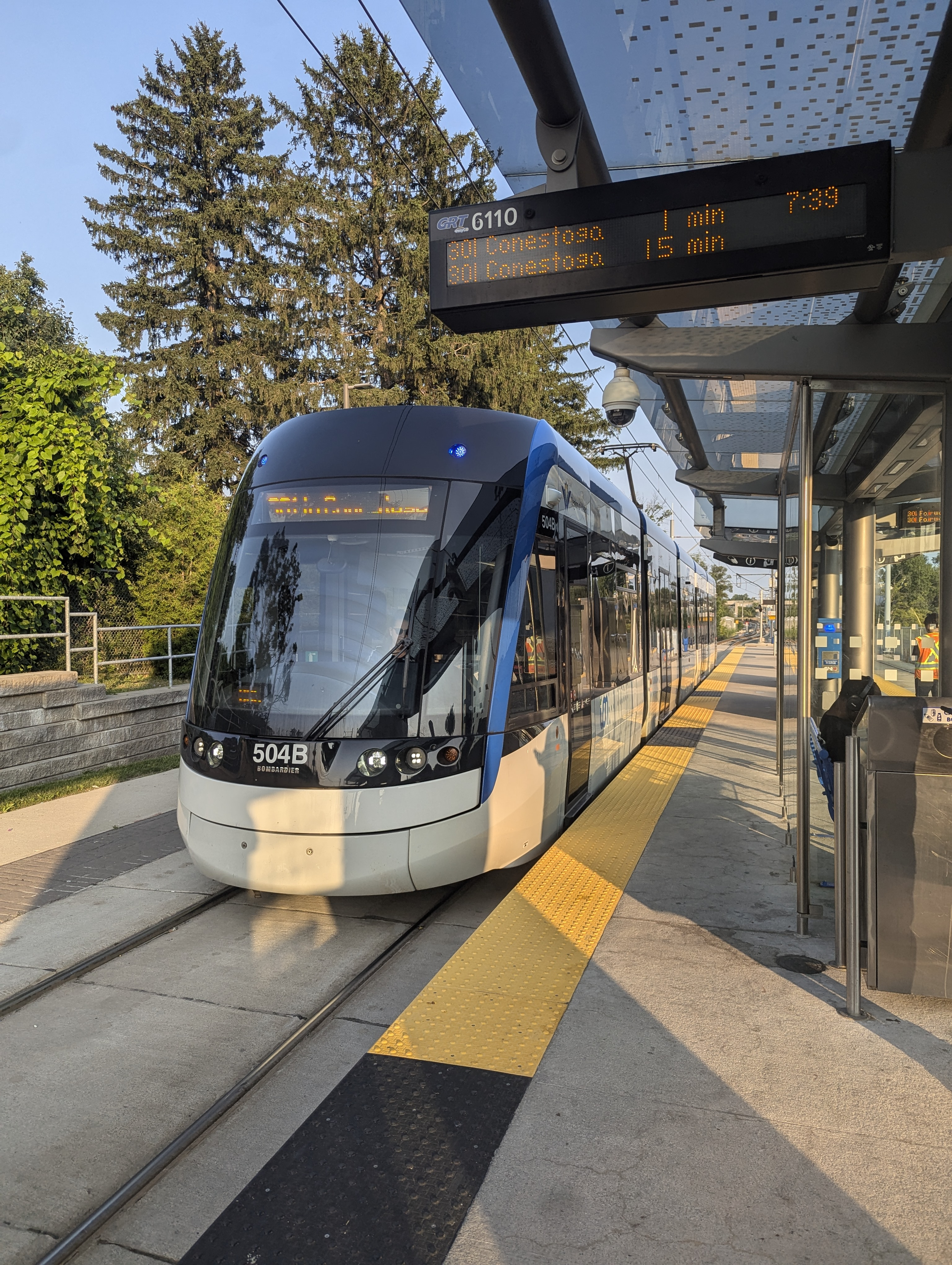
- Northbound train to Conestoga station arriving at Mill station, 2024

General information
- Location: Kitchener, Ontario; Canada
- Coordinates: 43.43395°N 80.47839°W
- Platforms: Centre platform
- Tracks: 2
- Bus operators: Grand River Transit
- Connections: 205 iXpress Ottawa; 3 Ottawa South

Construction
- Structure type: At-grade
- Accessible: Yes

History
- Opened: June 21, 2019

Services
Preceding station	Grand River Transit	Following station
Borden toward Conestoga	Ion	Block Line toward Fairway
Location

Mill is a stop on the Region of Waterloo's Ion rapid transit system. It is located southeast of the intersection of Ottawa and Mill Streets in Kitchener, alongside the CN Huron Subdivision. It opened on June 21, 2019.

Access to the platform is from the west, directly from the Ottawa Street sidewalk; to the east, there is only an emergency egress on the northern side.

The station's feature wall consists of ceramic tiles in a pattern of white, brown, and gray. The station also features the artwork Tall Tales of Mill Street by Terry O’Neill and Tara Cooper, with totems displaying elements about local legends.

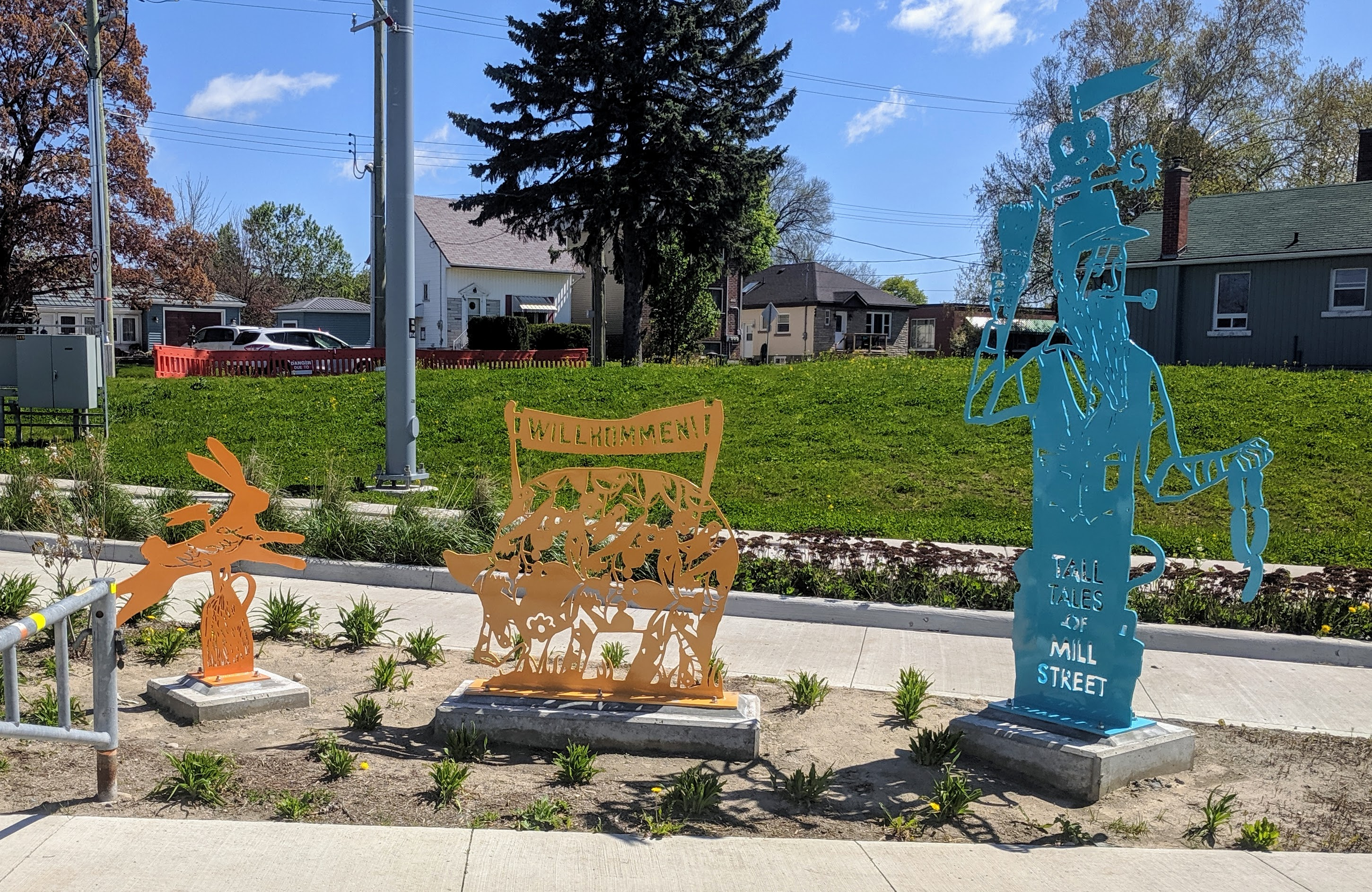
Tall Tales of Mill Street

The station is primarily surrounded by residential and light industrial areas; the closest major landmark is the Concordia Club, a major venue for Kitchener-Waterloo Oktoberfest, located 300 metres (980 ft) to the south.

South of the station, the LRT tracks share a corridor with the freight tracks but are physically separated from them. Each rail service has its own underpass of the Conestoga Parkway and bridge over Schneider Creek, before the LRT tracks divert at Hayward Avenue.

Rail tracks have bisected the Mill–Ottawa intersection for decades, but the addition of LRT tracks necessitated that it be rebuilt in a way that Mill Street would no longer be directly connected. Traffic along Mill coming eastward from the direction of downtown is now directed southeast along the tracks to a T-intersection with Ottawa, south of the former four-way intersection; that intersection is similarly now only a T, with Mill continuing east but westward traffic having to redirect along Ottawa.
