= Queen station (Kitchener) =

Light rail station in Kitchener, Ontario

Queen
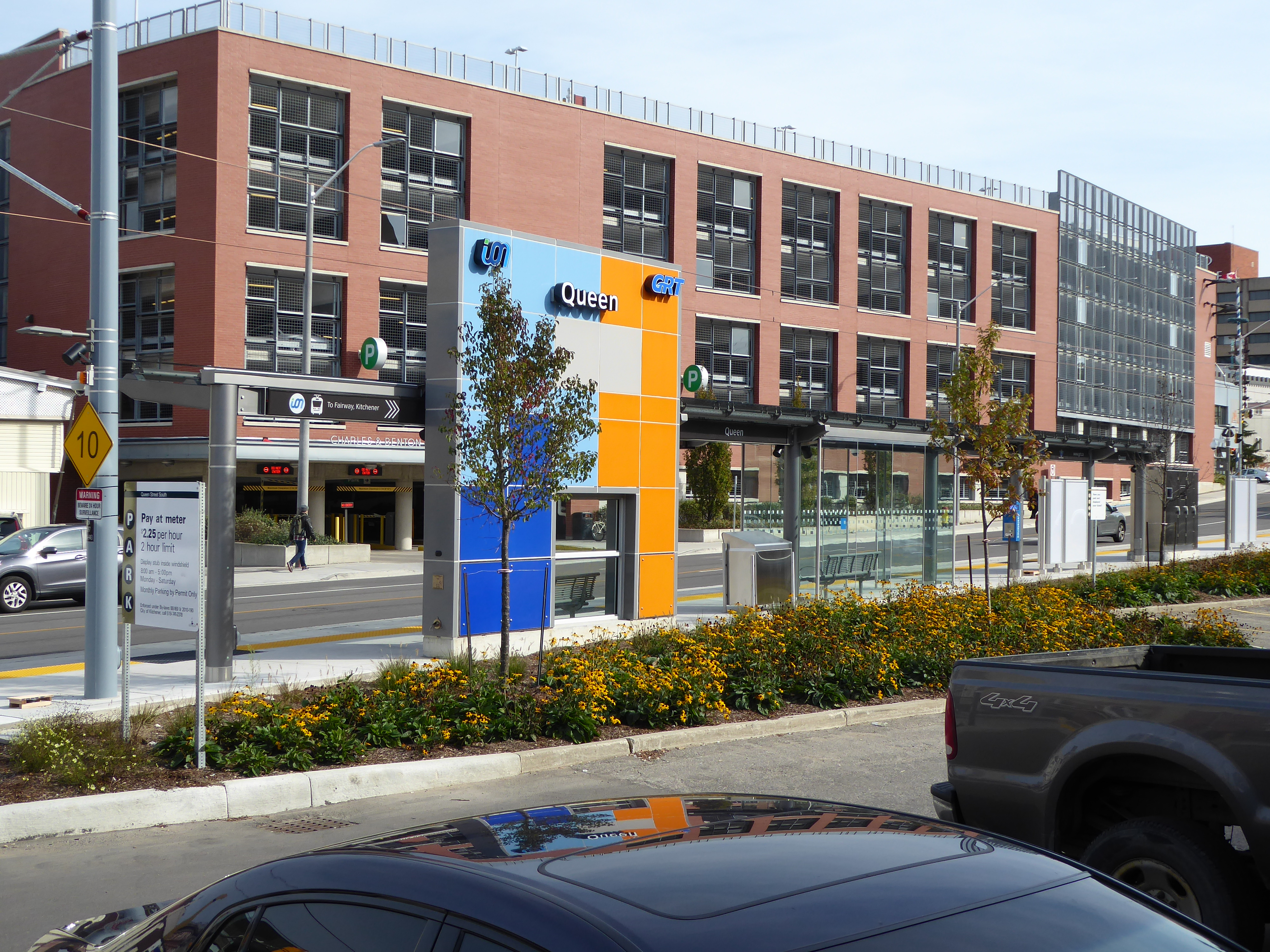
- Station structurally complete, October 2017

General information
- Location: Kitchener, Ontario; Canada
- Coordinates: 43.44871°N 80.48961°W
- Platforms: Side platform
- Tracks: 1
- Bus routes: 5
- Bus operators: Grand River Transit
- Connections: 204 iXpress Highland-Victoria; 1 Queen-River; 3 Ottawa South; 6 Bridge-Courtland; 7 King

Construction
- Accessible: Yes

Other information
- Status: Open

History
- Opened: June 21, 2019

Services
| Preceding station | Grand River Transit | Following station |
|---|---|---|
| Victoria Park One-way operation | Ion | Kitchener Market toward Fairway |
Location

Queen is a stop on the Region of Waterloo's Ion rapid transit system. It is located alongside Charles Street, just east of Queen Street, in Kitchener. It opened in 2019.

The station serves southbound trains only; the nearest northbound platform is at Frederick station, about 150 metres (490 ft) away up Charles and Benton streets.

The station's feature wall consists of ceramic tiles in a pattern of teal, gray, orange and blue.

The platform is connected with Charles Street's sidewalks at either end, and pedestrians passing through walk along the platform.

== History ==
The current rapid transit station is the second train station in Kitchener which is named after (and located near) Queen Street. The Grand River Railway's main Kitchener station, which was located near the current Iron Horse Trail crossing with the street, was in service until 1955. The station building was demolished in the 1970s.

The station was structurally complete in October 2017, but only opened on June 21, 2019 along with the rest of the Ion light rail system.

In 2020, the City of Kitchener committed to a set of pedestrian infrastructure improvements on Queen Street near the station, which were designed to improve walkability in the area. These included wider sidewalks, more seating, and new trees and planters, as well as creation of a new parkette at Charles and Queen.
