= Block Line station =

Light rail station in Kitchener, Ontario

Block Line
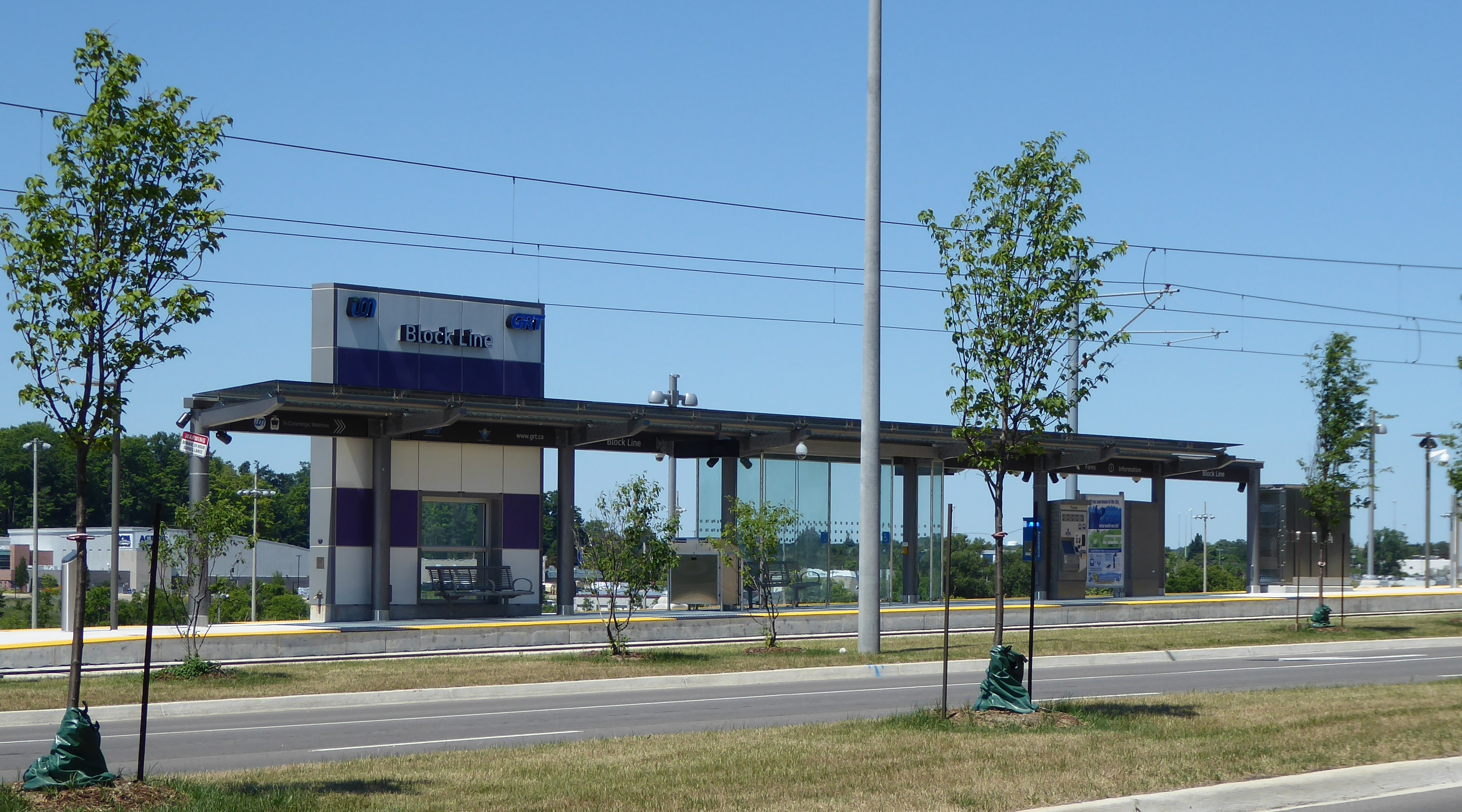
- Station structurally complete, July 2018

General information
- Location: Kitchener, Ontario; Canada
- Coordinates: 43.42260°N 80.46263°W
- Platforms: Centre platform
- Tracks: 2
- Bus operators: Grand River Transit
- Connections: 201 iXpress Fischer-Hallman; 6 Bridge-Courtland; 22 Laurentian West; 26 Trillium; 33 Huron

Construction
- Structure type: At-grade
- Accessible: Yes

History
- Opened: June 21, 2019

Services
Preceding station	Grand River Transit	Following station
Mill toward Conestoga	Ion	Fairway Terminus
Location

Block Line is a stop on the Region of Waterloo's Ion rapid transit system. It is located alongside Courtland Avenue in Kitchener, just north of Block Line Road. It opened on June 21, 2019.

Access to the platform is from the south, from the Block Line sidewalk; and from the north, from the Courtland and Hillmount intersection.

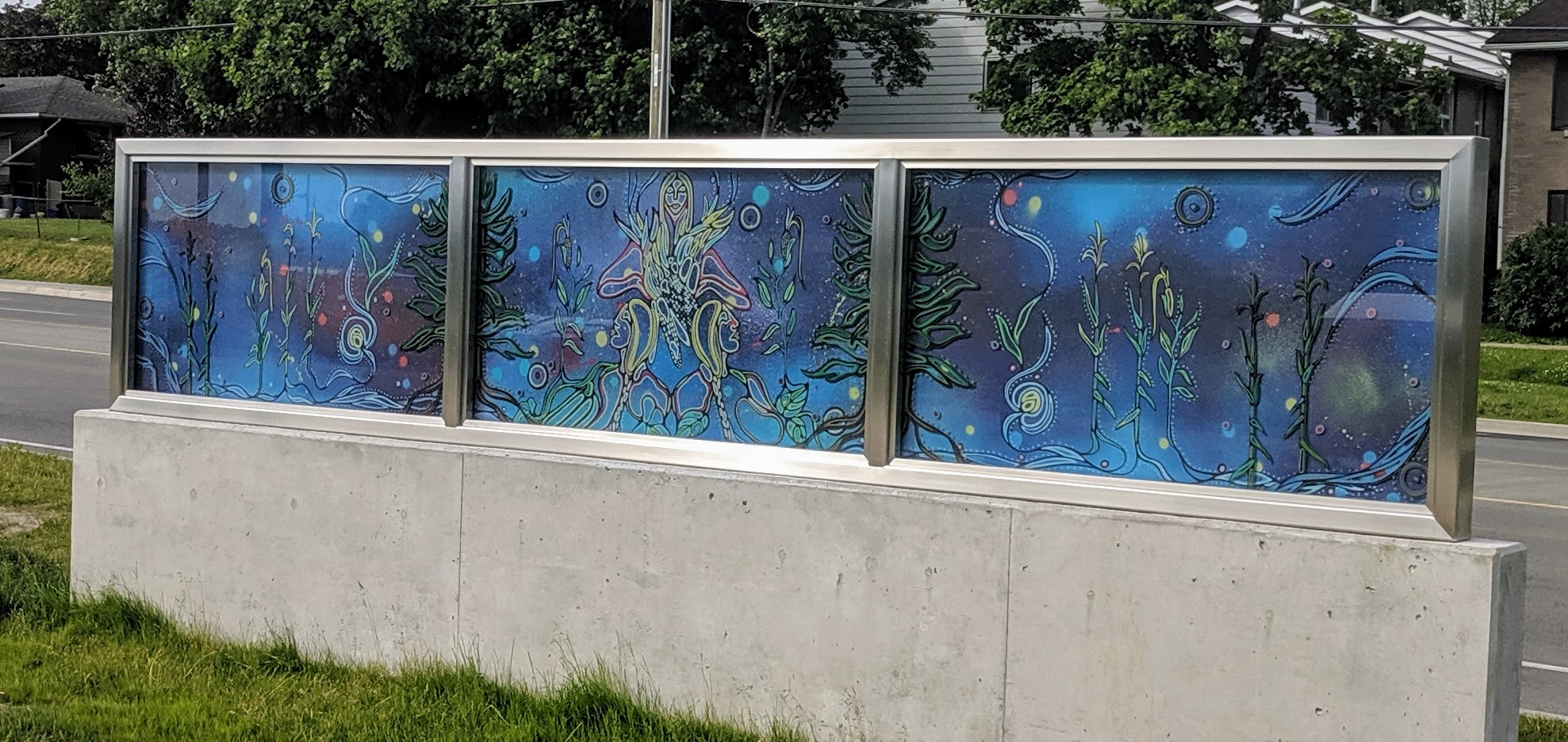
Three Sisters

The station features the artwork Three Sisters by Haudenosaunee/ Anishinaabe artists Lindsey Lickers and Katharine Harvey, having a digitally printed glass wall with images narrating the history and culture of the First Peoples.

St. Mary's High School is located about 500 metres (1,600 ft) southwest of the station, and the recreational facilities of the Peter Hallman Ball Yard and the Activa Sportsplex are also nearby.

With the adjustment of bus routes following the launch of light rail service in June 2019, several routes require buses to perform U-turns to stop at the station. This is stated to be a temporary measure until bus bays and a bus terminal are built.
