= Frederick station (Kitchener) =

Light rail station in Kitchener, Ontario

Frederick
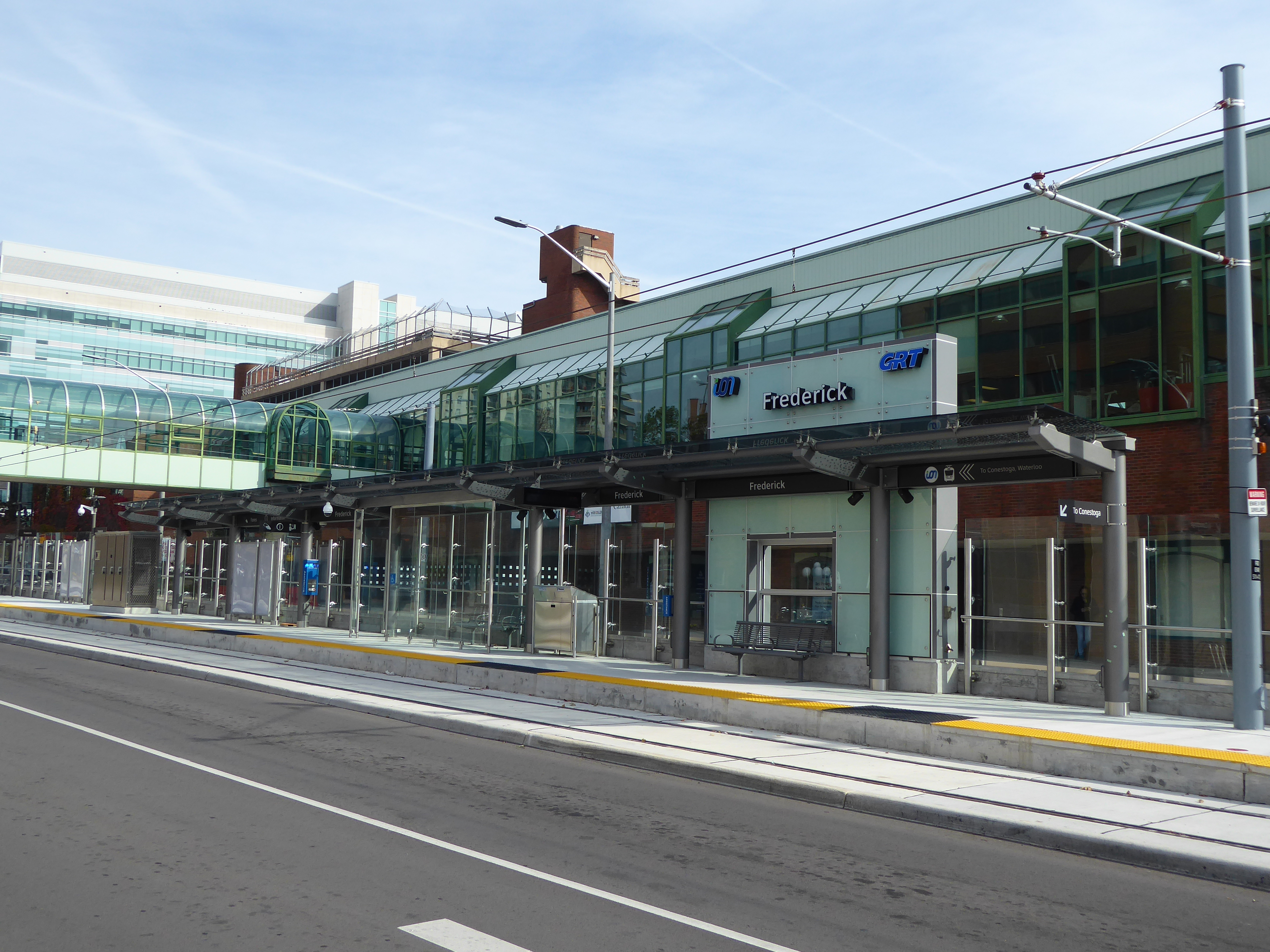
- Station structurally complete, October 2017

General information
- Location: Kitchener, Ontario; Canada
- Coordinates: 43°26′58″N 80°29′15″W
- Platforms: Side platform
- Tracks: 1
- Bus routes: 7
- Bus operators: Grand River Transit
- Connections: 204 iXpress Highland-Victoria; 1 Queen-River; 3 Ottawa South; 4 Glasgow-Margaret; 7 King; 8 Weber; 20 Victoria-Frederick

Construction
- Accessible: Yes

Other information
- Status: Open

History
- Opened: June 21, 2019

Services
Preceding station	Grand River Transit	Following station
Kitchener City Hall toward Conestoga	Ion	Kitchener Market One-way operation
Location

Frederick is a stop on the Region of Waterloo's Ion rapid transit system. It is located in the median of Frederick Street, just east of King Street, in downtown Kitchener. It opened in 2019.

The station serves northbound trains only; the nearest southbound platform is at Queen station, about 150 metres (500 ft) away down Benton and Charles streets.

The station's feature wall consists of solid green glass tiles; this mimics the coloration of the exterior of Market Square.

The primary access to the platform is from the crosswalk at King Street; a secondary access at the north end of the platform, crossing the southbound lanes of Frederick Street, is marked as an emergency exit only.

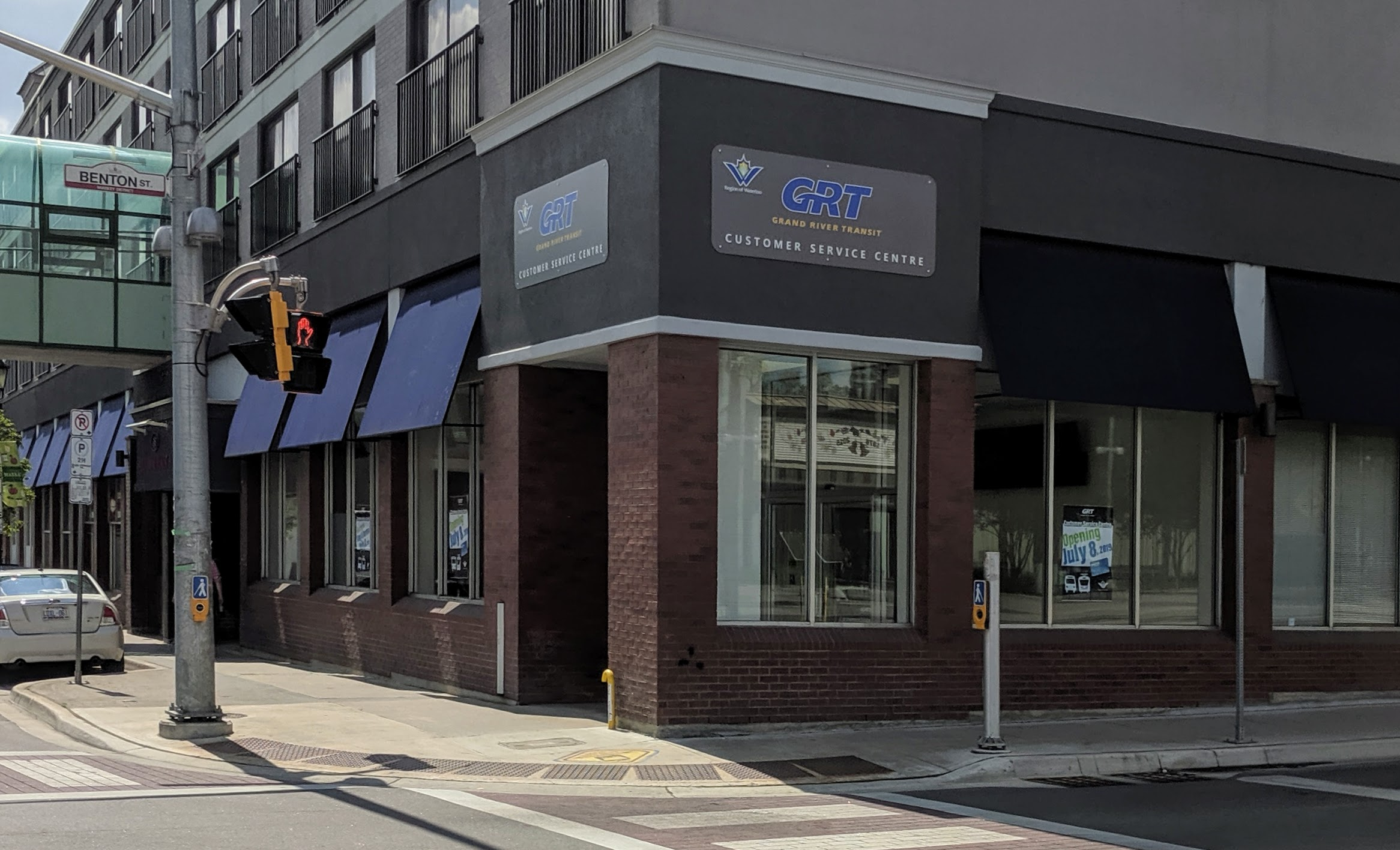
GRT customer service centre

Destinations served include the Market Square shopping and office complex, the regional courthouse, and TheMuseum. To the north of the station is the proposed 'Duke Tower Kitchener' condominium development. Across King, at Benton, is a Grand River Transit customer service office.
