= Borden station =

Light rail station in Kitchener, Ontario

Borden
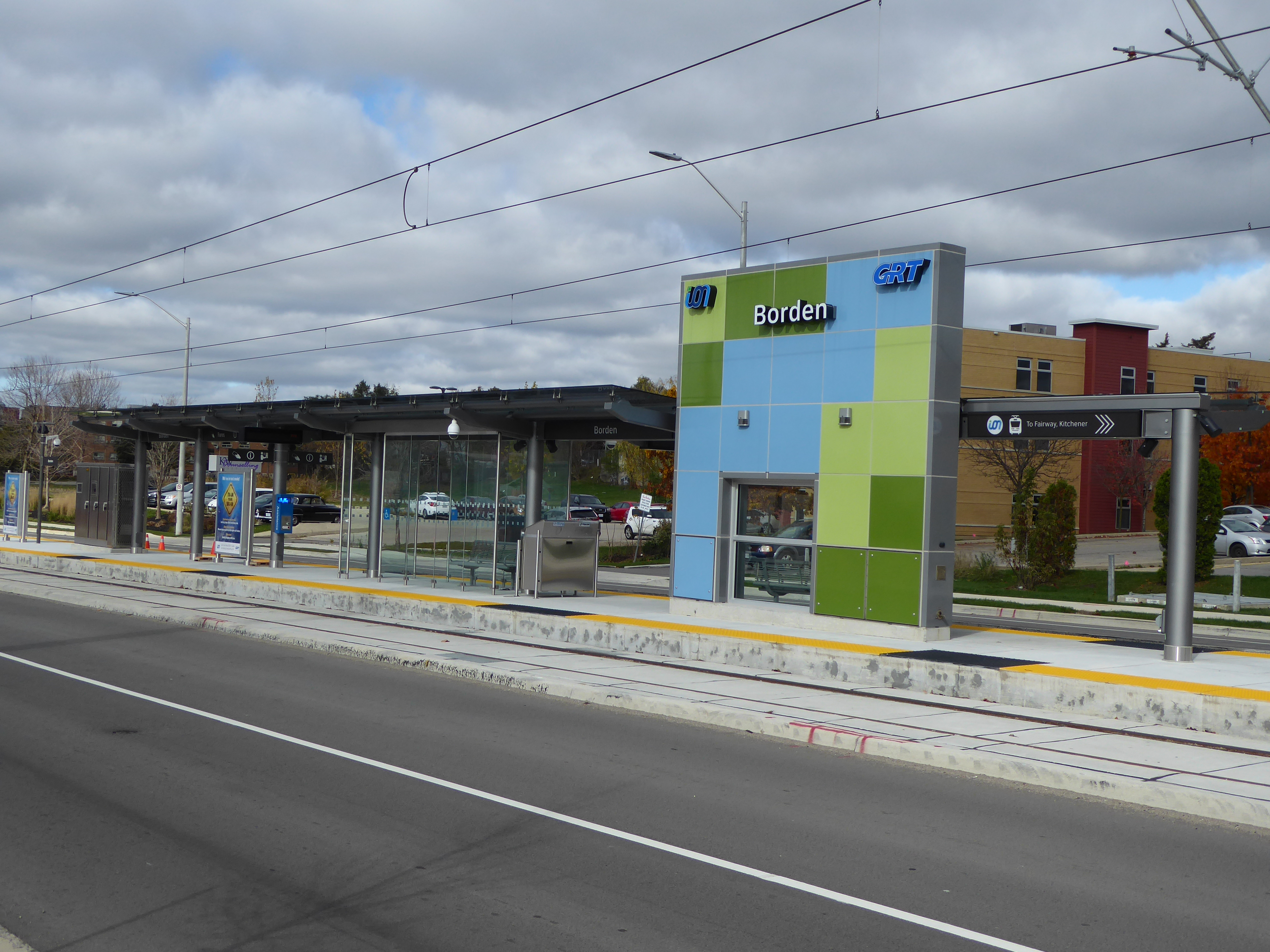
- Station structurally complete, November 2017

General information
- Location: Kitchener, Ontario; Canada
- Coordinates: 43.44228°N 80.47501°W
- Platforms: Centre platform
- Tracks: 2
- Bus operators: Grand River Transit
- Connections: 205 iXpress Ottawa; 2 Stirling; 7 King

Construction
- Accessible: Yes

Other information
- Status: Open

History
- Opened: June 21, 2019

Services
| Preceding station | Grand River Transit | Following station |
|---|---|---|
| Kitchener Market toward Conestoga | Ion | Mill toward Fairway |
Location

Borden is a stop on the Region of Waterloo's Ion rapid transit system. It is located in the median of Charles Street in Kitchener, at Borden Avenue. It opened in 2019.

South of the station, the line branches; southbound tracks follow Borden Avenue, while northbound tracks continue along Charles to then follow Ottawa Street. Both branches merge again before the next station, Mill.

The station's feature wall consists of ceramic tiles in a pattern of sky blue, pale green, and forest green.

The primary access to the platform is from the crosswalk at Borden Street; secondary accesses at the west end of the platform, crossing either side of Charles Street, are marked as emergency exits only.

Kitchener city council approved a plan seeking to create a "walkable urban village" in the neighbourhood. Maximum densities could go from the prior 46 residents and jobs per hectare to 250 residents and jobs per hectare near the Borden Avenue LRT station.

Businesses in the vicinity of the station (as of 2018) include a Tim Hortons coffee shop, a City Cafe Bakery bagel and coffee shop, Grand River Rocks indoor rock climbing gym and Kitchener Kicks Martial Arts Centre. Borden is also the closest station to the Region's largest sporting arena, the Kitchener Memorial Auditorium, located 800 metres (2,600 ft) to the northeast.
