= Research and Technology station =

Light rail station in Waterloo, Ontario

Research and Technology
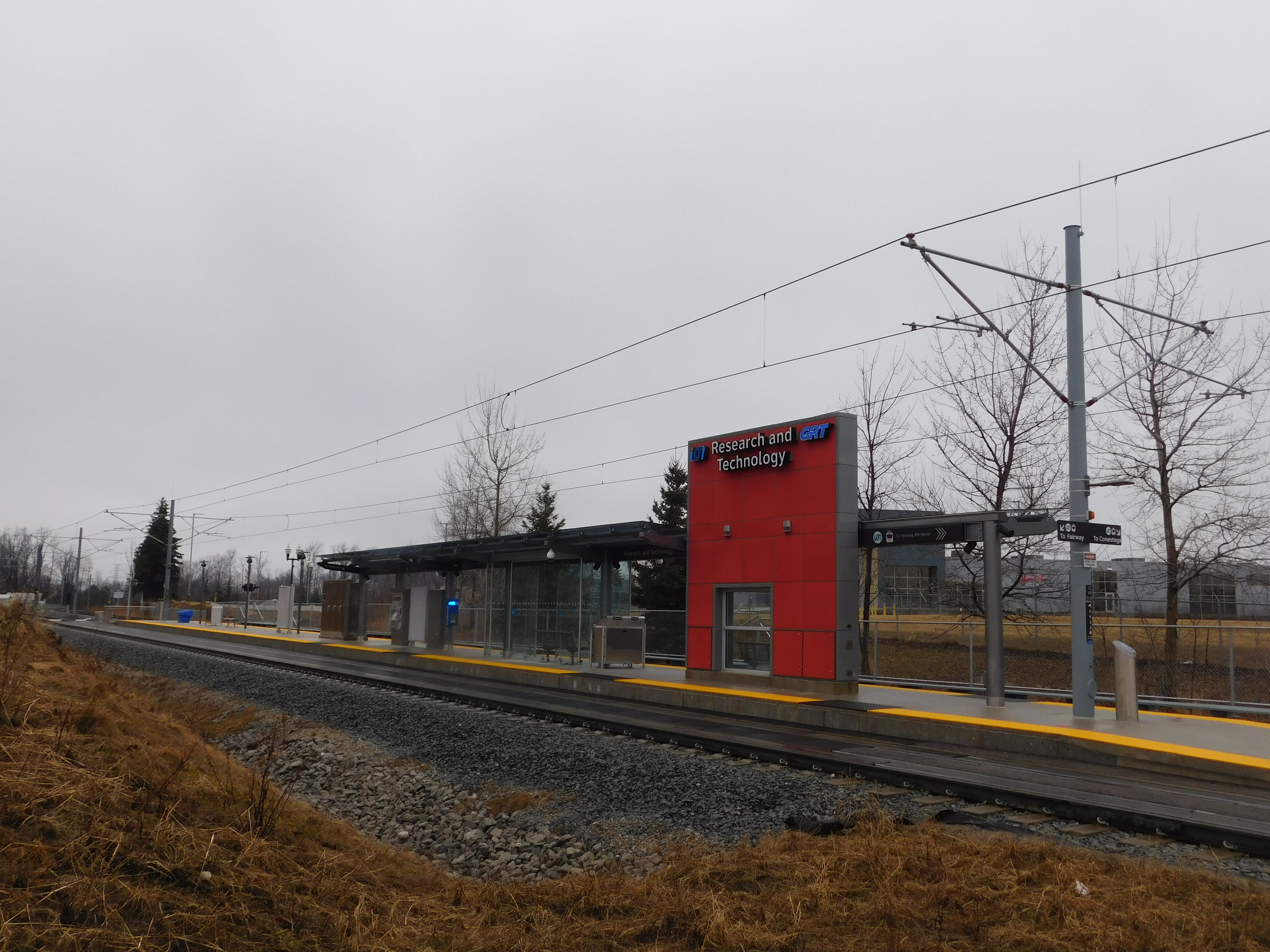
- A complete Research and Technology station in March 2019

General information
- Location: Waterloo, Ontario; Canada
- Coordinates: 43.48136°N 80.54527°W
- Platforms: Centre platform
- Tracks: 2
- Bus routes: 1
- Bus operators: Grand River Transit
- Connections: 9 Lakeshore; Waterloop Trail

Construction
- Accessible: Yes

History
- Opened: June 21, 2019

Services
Preceding station	Grand River Transit	Following station
Northfield toward Conestoga	Ion	University of Waterloo toward Fairway
Location

Research and Technology is a stop on the Region of Waterloo's Ion rapid transit system. It is located on the Waterloo Spur rail line in Waterloo, between Bearinger Road and Columbia Street, near a prominent bend in Wes Graham Way. It opened in 2019, and it serves its namesake, the David Johnston Research and Technology Park, to the west, and the industrial lands along Philip Street to the east (via a pedestrian pathway).

Access to the platform from the south is only from the Wes Graham Way side; to the north, the only exit is the pathway to Philip Street. The southbound track is also used by freight trains on the Waterloo Spur line, which serves industrial locations in Elmira. These trains only run in the overnight hours after LRT service has halted. To protect the station structure (and the trains themselves), a gauntlet track is in place alongside this station that offsets the freight track a small distance.

The station's feature wall consists of ceramic tiles in a solid red.

In the summer of 2020, the land between the platform and Wes Graham Way was converted into a park-like community space with landscaping, paths and benches.

The station was to feature two artworks: Network by Ken Hall, a sculpture about connections supporting technological development, and The Passenger by Brandon Vickerd, a bronze figure to invite thoughtful reflection on the human relationship to nature. Network was cancelled when the artist was unable to complete the work due to other commitments; The Passenger was installed in October 2020.
