= Northfield station (Waterloo) =

Light rail station in Waterloo, Ontario

Northfield
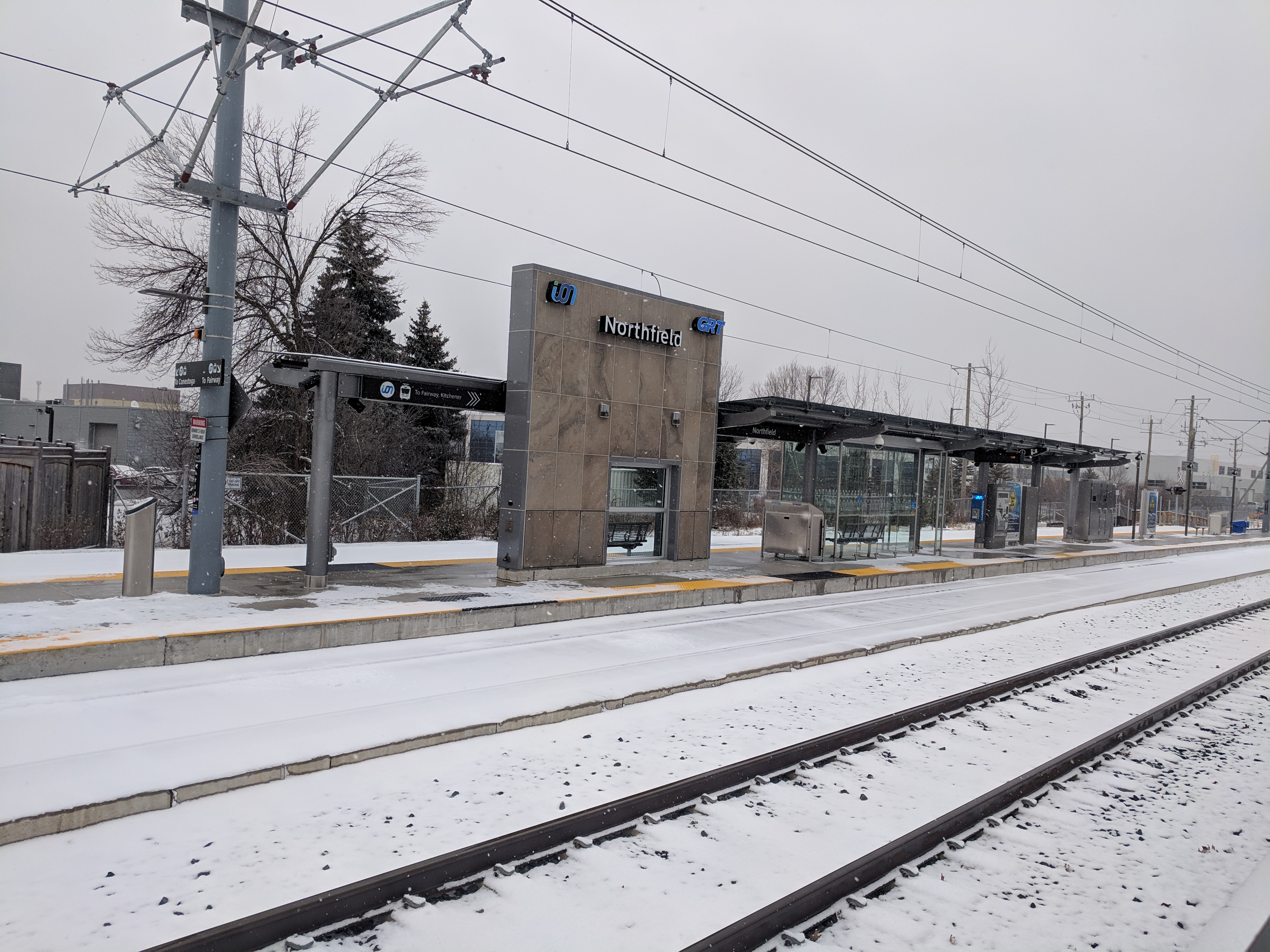
- Station completed, December 2018

General information
- Location: Waterloo, Ontario; Canada
- Coordinates: 43.49736°N 80.54330°W
- Platforms: Centre platform
- Tracks: 2
- Bus routes: 3
- Bus operators: Grand River Transit
- Connections: 9 Lakeshore; 19 Hazel; 73 Northlake

Construction
- Accessible: Yes

History
- Opened: June 21, 2019

Services
Preceding station	Grand River Transit	Following station
Conestoga Terminus	Ion	Research and Technology toward Fairway
Preceding station	Heritage railways	Following station
St. Jacobs Farmers' Market towards Elmira	Waterloo Central Railway transfer at Waterloo (Northfield)	Terminus
Location

Northfield is a stop on the Region of Waterloo's Ion rapid transit system. It is located on Northfield Drive in Waterloo, between Parkside Drive and the Conestoga Parkway, at the existing railway corridor. It opened on June 21, 2019.

Access to the platform is from the north, directly from the Northfield Drive sidewalk; to the south, there is only an emergency egress on the eastern side, where a locked gate gives access for Ion staff to the Operations and Maintenance facility just to the south.

The station's feature wall consists of brown stone tiles with wavering variations.

Just opposite the station on Northfield Drive, in the same rail corridor, is the southern terminus of the Waterloo Central Railway tourist train to St. Jacobs and Elmira.

It marks a transition point between tracks running in the boulevard of a road in the direction of the Conestoga terminus, and open tracks running in a railway corridor in the direction of Uptown Waterloo. Just south of the station, the Waterloo Spur freight line merges with the southbound track; a short distance south of that, the line accesses the Operations, Maintenance and Storage Facility.
