= Fairview Mall (disambiguation) =

Fairview Mall may refer to the following shopping centres in Canada:

- Fairview Mall, Toronto, Ontario
- CF Fairview Park (formerly known as Fairview Park Mall), Kitchener, Ontario
- Fairview Pointe-Claire, Pointe-Claire, Quebec
