= Ion rapid transit =

Rapid transit network in Waterloo Region, Ontario

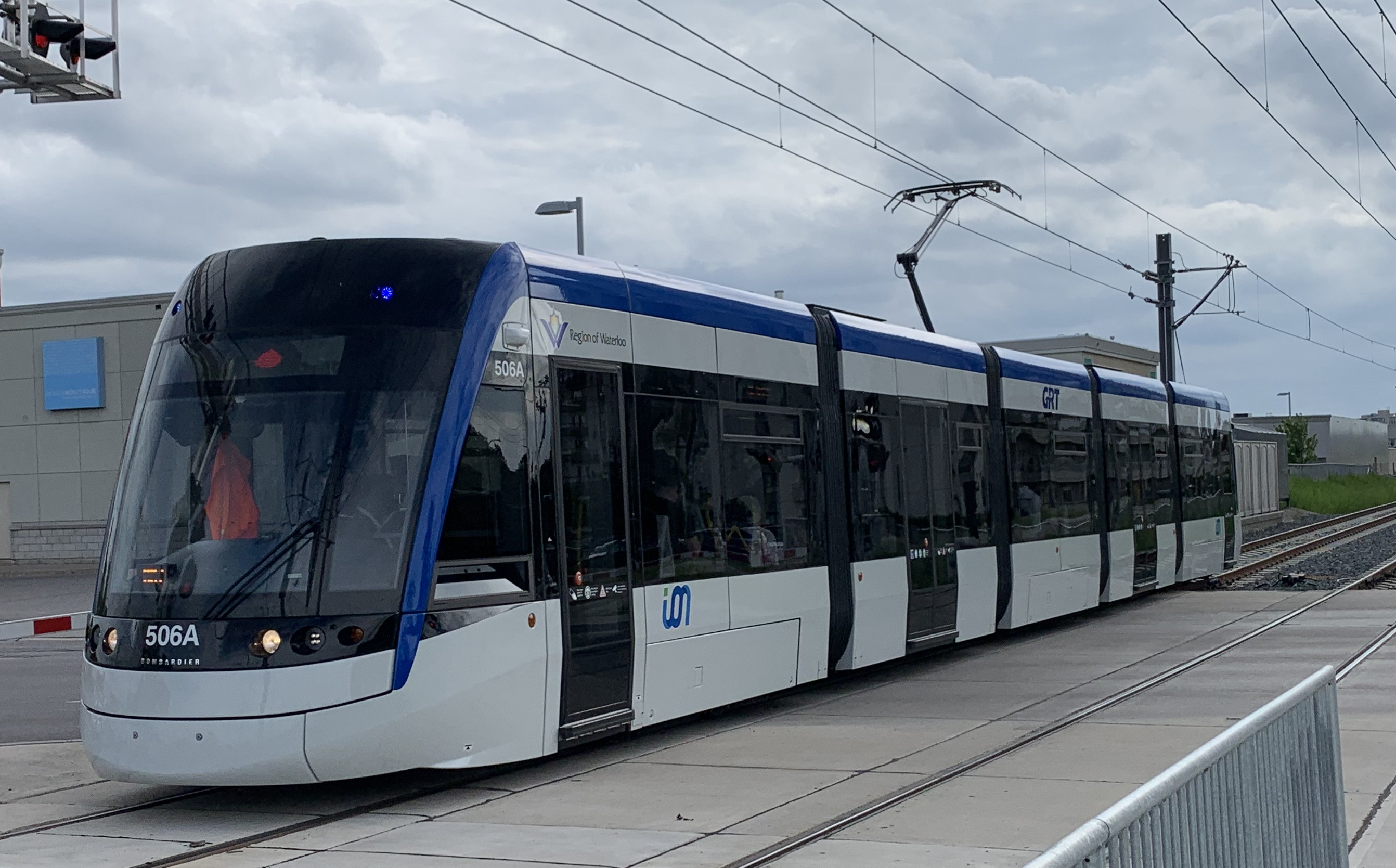
- Bombardier Flexity Freedom unit #506 approaches Fairway Station

Overview
- Owner: Region of Waterloo
- Locale: Kitchener and Waterloo, Ontario
- Transit type: Light rail Bus rapid transit
- Number of lines: 1 LRT; 1 BRT
- Line number: 301 ION Light Rail; 302 ION Bus
- Number of stations: 19 (6 of the 19 stations serve one direction only)
- Daily ridership: 25,000 (as of November 2020)
- Annual ridership: ▼3.58 million (as of December 2025)
- Website: https://www.grt.ca/

Operation
- Began operation: June 21, 2019; 7 years ago
- Operators: Keolis, GrandLinq, Grand River Transit
- Number of vehicles: 15 Flexity Freedom, 9 New Flyer Xcelsior

Technical
- System length: 19 km (12 mi)
- Track gauge: 1,435 mm (4 ft 8 1/2 in) standard gauge
- Electrification: 750 V DC overhead
System map

Ion, stylized as ION, is an integrated public transportation network in the Regional Municipality of Waterloo in Ontario, Canada. It is operated by Keolis and is part of the Grand River Transit (GRT) system, partially replacing GRT's Route 200 iXpress bus service. The section of the bus route serving Cambridge has been renamed "Ion Bus", and renumbered as 302. The first phase commenced operations on June 21, 2019, between the north end of Waterloo and the south end of Kitchener. In 2023, Ion LRT had an annual ridership of 4.3 million, and a daily ridership of 11,780.

In 2009, an Environmental Assessment (EA) began to create a proposal for electrically powered light rail transit through Kitchener and Waterloo, and adapted bus rapid transit from Kitchener to Cambridge. On June 24, 2009, Regional Council voted to approve the project, subject to funding from higher levels of government, which was in turn approved by council on June 15, 2011. This was followed by a community building strategy to guide development, identify key destinations, and strengthen regional connections. The strategy, led by Urban Strategies Inc. of Toronto, consulted hundreds of individuals and stakeholders from Cambridge, Kitchener, and Waterloo.

Construction began in August 2014 and service was expected to begin in late 2017; however, because of delays in the manufacture and delivery of rolling stock, the introduction of the light rail service was significantly delayed. The total cost of the system was estimated at $818 million, but in December 2017, the overruns were estimated to total approximately $50 million. The provincial government was expected to provide $25 million of that amount.

A future extension of light rail to the downtown Galt area of Cambridge (Phase 2) is planned but construction may not begin on that line until 2028. In 2025, the Cambridge City Council proposed the idea of using bus rapid transit instead of LRT to save costs and to keep options open. Disability rights advocates argued that light rail transit between Conestoga Mall and Ainslie St. Transit Terminal would increase accessibility, reduce wait times, and decrease traffic congestion. In November 2025, the Region of Waterloo council approved the LRT extension to downtown Cambridge instead of the BRT option, citing 78% of the 2,500 residents supported the LRT extension in a survey. The extension is projected to add 17 km of tracks from Fairway to downtown Cambridge in 29 minutes, with trains running every 7 minutes.

According to the Region of Waterloo, the Ion network is named after the charged atom, which it describes as being “always in motion”.

== History ==
=== Initial studies ===
In 2004, the Regional Municipality began an Individual Environmental Assessment to study the feasibility of constructing a rapid transit line to provide higher-order public transit service to the Region and to encourage more compact urban growth along the corridor.

The EA took a broader approach to studying possible routes and stations for the rapid transit line, examining several options such as utilizing existing tracks/roads and constructing new facilities. In keeping with legislation, the Environmental Assessment also examined ten possible transport technologies, including monorails and subways.

The EA as planned consisted of three phases:

Phase 1: Determine a preferred transportation strategy from options such as road expansion, improved conventional transit, and rapid transit. Phase 1 was completed in July 2006.

Phase 2:

Step 1: Determine a preferred route design (grade separated, dedicated on-road, dedicated off-road, etc.) and technology. The EA examined ten different technologies including light rail, bus rapid transit, monorail, and subway. Step 1, completed in February 2007, determined that light rail transit and bus rapid transit were best suited to meet the needs of the Regional Growth Management Strategy.
Step 2: Determined a short list of preferred routes and technologies for seven segments of a rapid transit system (completed in 2008).
Step 3: Proposed an overall preferred rapid transit system (completed June 2009)

Phase 3: Design an implementation plan for the rapid transit system.

In June 2008, the Province of Ontario announced a new expedited Transit Project Assessment Process (Ontario Regulation 231/08). In August 2008, the Region notified the Ministry of the Environment (MOE) to advise that it would transition from the Individual Environmental Assessment to the expedited process. For that reason, Phase 3 of the Individual EA would not be completed.

On June 24, 2009, Regional Council approved the initiative and continued discussions with Provincial and Federal governments to obtain funding for the $790-million project. Light Rail Transit (LRT) was short-listed as the technology for the new rapid transit system. The Region decided on a staged approach, building light rail from Conestoga Mall to Fairview Park Mall, passing through Uptown Waterloo and Downtown Kitchener on the way. Adapted Bus Rapid Transit (aBRT) would be built from Fairview Park Mall to Ainslie Street terminal in Cambridge utilizing shoulder bypass lanes along Highways 8 and 401 during heavy traffic where speeds are often 40 km/h (25 mph) or less. As of June 2019, there is still no specific timeline for replacing the aBRT service to Cambridge with light rail.

In May 2009, a Facebook group named "I Support Light Rail Transit in the Region of Waterloo" was created, and boasted over 1,600 members. Shortly after its creation, the group creator and other LRT supporters formed the "Tri-Cities Transport Action Group" (TriTAG). According to its website, TriTAG supports LRT as a needed method of shaping development, meeting future capacity needs, protecting the environment, and providing the most economical solution for transportation in the Region. Six months after founding, TriTAG launched an email campaign to allow supporters of LRT to email their MPs, MPPs, and other government officials such as the federal and provincial Ministers of Transportation. Within a few days, thousands of emails had been sent. For the 2010 Regional Budget, TriTAG and its supporters presented to the Regional Budget Committee regarding various areas of transportation funding. While the focus was not on LRT, the delegates spoke about the importance of proper transportation infrastructure (pedestrian, cycling, transit) on a successful LRT system. TriTAG continued their support of the project into the bid stage in 2014; a notable contribution was a video outlining the landmarks and amenities that the route will access. Proponents asserted that the region's plans for rapid transit will be an essential component of planning and rationally controlling the Region's growth.

=== Approved light rail system ===
On June 24, 2009, Regional Council approved LRT as the technology for rapid transit in Waterloo Region. Regional Council also approved a recommendation to implement the system in stages because ridership, development potential and capital and operating costs vary along the route.

The light rail system was approved by Regional Council with a vote of 15–1. Cambridge mayor Doug Craig cast the dissenting vote. Other Cambridge-area representatives joined Craig in voting against subsequent motions on the service's staging, feeling that running only buses to that city does them a disservice.

The Province of Ontario had promised to fund up to two thirds of the cost of the construction of a light rail or bus rapid transit system in Waterloo Region. However, in the summer of 2010, actual funding commitments from higher levels of government for the combined LRT and aBRT system were announced: $300 million from the province of Ontario, and $265 million (or up to 1/3 of the full cost) from the federal government. The provincial figure was disappointing to supporters, as the provincial government had previously promised to pay 2/3 of the cost. Regional council debated funding the remaining $200–300 million required for the project to go ahead as planned.

During public consultation for the project, concerns related to the light rail proposal focused on its relative service infrequency when compared with rapid transit systems in other cities (though it would still outperform the Region's best bus services in its overall service capacity, and the frequency of many routes); the projected service frequency will be approximately 7.5 minutes. In addition, a light rail line would be limited by the narrow main streets of key downtown areas. A feasible proposal raised by the Region for dealing with this challenge would be to have light rail vehicles (LRVs) share space with traffic within core areas, somewhat resembling the streetcar network of nearby Toronto. A bus rapid transit line would also face the challenge of the cramped core areas, and thus would also likely share space with traffic in core areas.

In late 2011, planning was well underway and preparations were being made. In October, a property on Dutton Drive in Waterloo, bordering the rail-line corridor where the LRT is planned to be installed, was purchased to serve as a maintenance and storage yard for the system's LRVs. The site, which was purchased for $6 million, will contain three buildings: the largest is 75,000 square feet (7,000 m^{2}) and will house the operations centre and a repair shop; one will include a washing system; and the third is a 15,000 square feet (1,400 m^{2}) wayside maintenance building that will house the repair truck fleet.

=== Staging ===
The Region approved a staged implementation plan for its rapid transit system:

Stage 1 – Implementation of LRT north of Fairview Park Mall and adapted Bus Rapid Transit south of Fairview Park Mall, including:

- LRT from Conestoga Mall in Waterloo to Fairview Park Mall in Kitchener;
- Adapted Bus Rapid Transit (aBRT) from Fairview Park Mall in Kitchener to Ainslie Street Terminal in downtown Cambridge
- Re-aligned Grand River Transit (GRT) bus service to provide an expanded level of service to the rapid transit stations along primary feeder corridors;
- Express bus service, modelled after the current iXpress service, to high ridership centres throughout the Region (i.e., Wilfrid Laurier University, Conestoga College, etc.);
- Connections to intercity transit such as GO Transit, Greyhound, and Via Rail.

The stage 1 route is 19 kilometres (12 mi) long.

Stage 2 – Completion of a light rail transit system from Fairview Park in Kitchener to Ainslie Street in Cambridge. Commencement of Stage 2 to follow completion of Stage 1 as closely as possible.

=== Opposition ===
A group opposed to the rapid transit proposal, called "Taxpayers for Sensible Transit" (T4ST), was formed in June 2009. According to its website, T4ST opposes LRT as being a proposal too big and too expensive for the region, which will hurt businesses and the local economy. Taxpayers for Sensible Transit did not present a position regarding transportation and transit funding for the 2010 Regional Budget.

In September 2013 Doug Craig, the mayor of Cambridge, called for examining the cost of cancelling the light rail line. He justified this examination due to doubts by Toronto politicians over its light rail line.

On November 19, 2013, it was reported that Craig was working to "extricate" Cambridge from any obligation to pay for the line connecting it to Kitchener, while, at the same time, trying to argue for connecting Cambridge to Toronto, via a GO line.

=== Stage 1 construction ===
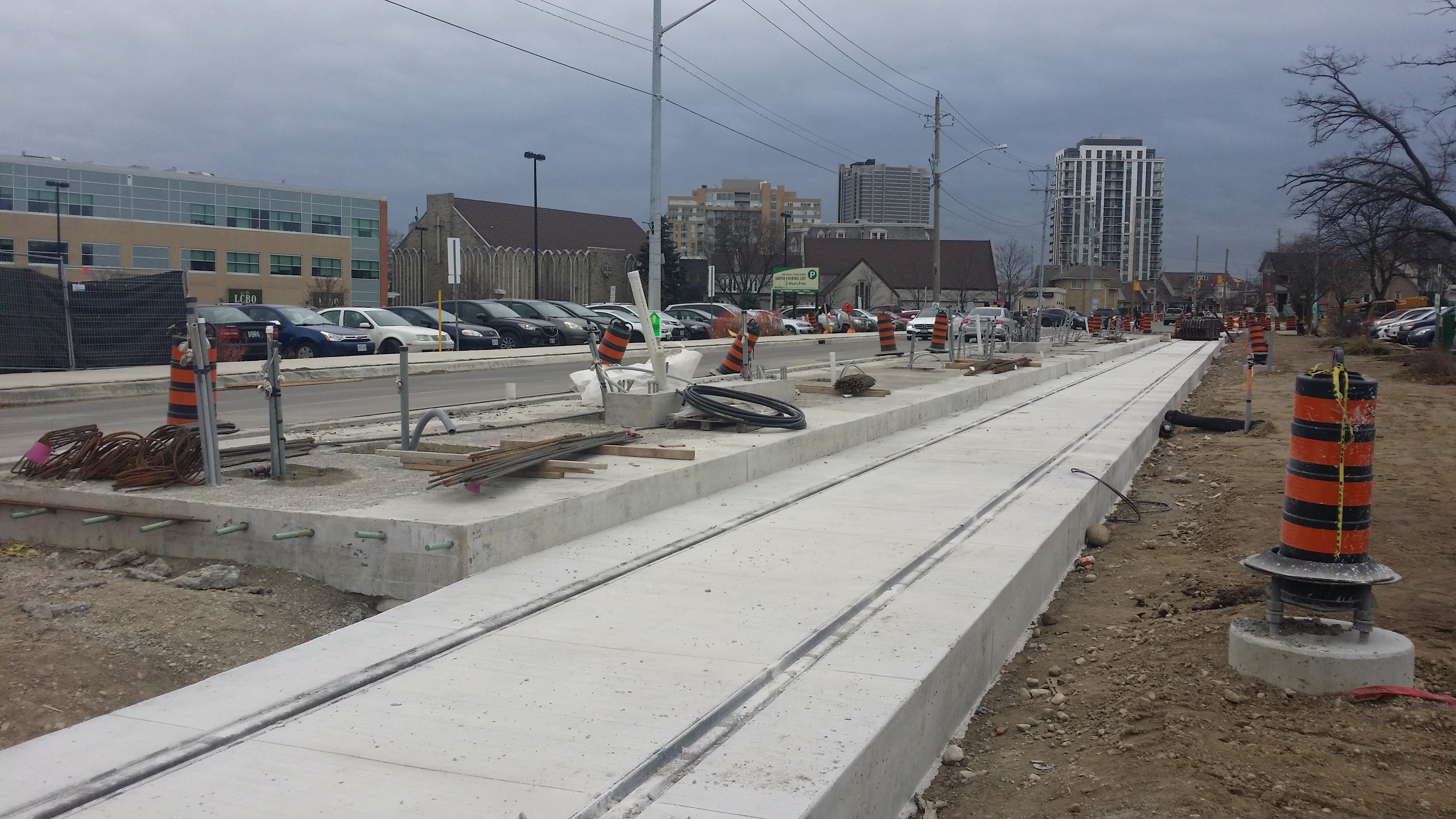
Willis Way station under construction in December 2015; both the embedded track and station platform have been poured

Out of the seven groups that showed an interest in the project, by December 18, 2013, three consortiums had submitted bids to design, build, finance, operate and maintain the Ion system. The winning bid was selected at a committee meeting on March 4, 2014. GrandLinq was the preferred bidder. The final approval of the GrandLinq bid came at a full council meeting on March 19, and financial close was made May 9.

In March 2014, just as the Region was preparing to give final approval to the construction contract, a group titled "Coalition Stop Waterloo LRT" filed a legal injunction against the project, claiming it did not meet planning guidelines and should be stopped. A court decision on March 18 dismissed the motion, but did not rule out further legal review. It later emerged that the only citizen directly associated with the filing coalition was local businessman Jay Aissa. Ann Tucker of the Ontario Superior Court dismissed the suit on March 19, 2014. In July, Aissa announced that he was dropping further legal challenges and instead would take a political option to oppose the project, running against incumbent Regional chairman Ken Seiling. Seiling was re-elected Chairman with 58.4% of the vote.

- Utility relocation and other associated work began in late 2013. Construction officially started with a groundbreaking event on August 21, 2014.
- The first sections of the route scheduled for work were Borden Avenue in Kitchener, and Caroline Street in Waterloo. In early 2015, work shifted to Charles Street and King Street in Kitchener, and within the railway corridors. In March, under a stretch of King Street, GrandLinq reported finding wooden rail ties from the streetcar line, abandoned in the 1950s, unearthed during excavation.
- By late 2015, many stretches of track were installed and some stations had their concrete pads poured.
- By the end of 2016, system construction was 90% complete, including full completion of the maintenance facility and all underground utility work.
- In late February 2017, Bombardier Transportation had delivered a single sample-only LRV for testing. The Region reiterated that Stage 1 rail service would start in "early" 2018.
- At that time, plans for Stage 2 were still in the very early stage. Public consultation was to start soon, but in mid 2017, that process was postponed to 2018. Some routes and stops had been agreed upon in 2011, but the final plan was scheduled for completion in mid 2017.

=== Stage 2 planning ===
In February 2017, after limitations in the original route design came to light, a new preliminary preferred route plan was published. This would no longer use the CPR line south of Fairway; instead, it would travel to the east of it, along the River Rd extension and across Hwy 8; along King St into the Sportsworld area and under Hwy 401; along Shantz Hill Rd into Preston, and crossing the Speed River on a dedicated bridge.

The subsequent plan, rejected by Cambridge City Council in July 2017, indicated that the track would take Eagle St toward Hespeler, but to avoid conflicts with rail corridors and reduce traffic impacts at Eagle/Pinebush, would travel along the freight spur to Hespeler Rd. As previously, Hespeler Rd would be followed toward the Delta intersection, but to avoid traffic impacts it would veer east along the rail corridor behind Norfolk Ave, then transition to an abandoned railway corridor behind Grantham and Beverly Sts, before coming into downtown Galt near the Ainslie Terminal. (At least one journalist has pointed out the similarity between this plan and the electric Grand River Railway of the early 1900s.) More detailed rendering of the route became available in October 2019, indicating elevated sections would be used to cross Fairway Road, the Grand River, Fountain Street and the Speed River, and the CP Rail line by Eagle Street.

After publication of the February 2017 route plan, some citizens of Cambridge, particularly in the Preston area, were strongly objecting to the route, especially the section planned for Shantz hill and certain residential areas. City Council particularly objected to the Shantz Hill Road to Hespeler Road section and passed a motion in early July 2017 instructing staff to advise the Region of this and to request that alternatives be explored.

=== Impact ===
A report in late 2017 indicated that the new Ion system was responsible in part for a predicted building boom in the core of Kitchener, much of it located near LRT stations. An estimated $1.2 billion in building permits for 20 new developments was expected by March 2018, adding 1,000 apartments and 1,800 condominium units. According to the city, the anticipated development was a "mixture of high-density residential buildings with ground-floor retail, and office buildings with ground-floor retail". Half of the projects would be extensive in size. A report in the Waterloo Region Record of December 29, 2017 indicated that "since Ion was approved in 2009, the region has issued $2.4 billion in building permits within the LRT corridor." Rod Regier, Commissioner of Planning, Development and Legislative Services for Waterloo Region, commented on the increase in building permits. "My back-of-the-envelope estimate is that the private sector developers have invested almost double the full cost of the Ion itself in the transit corridor. That for me is really astonishing," he said.

== Operations ==
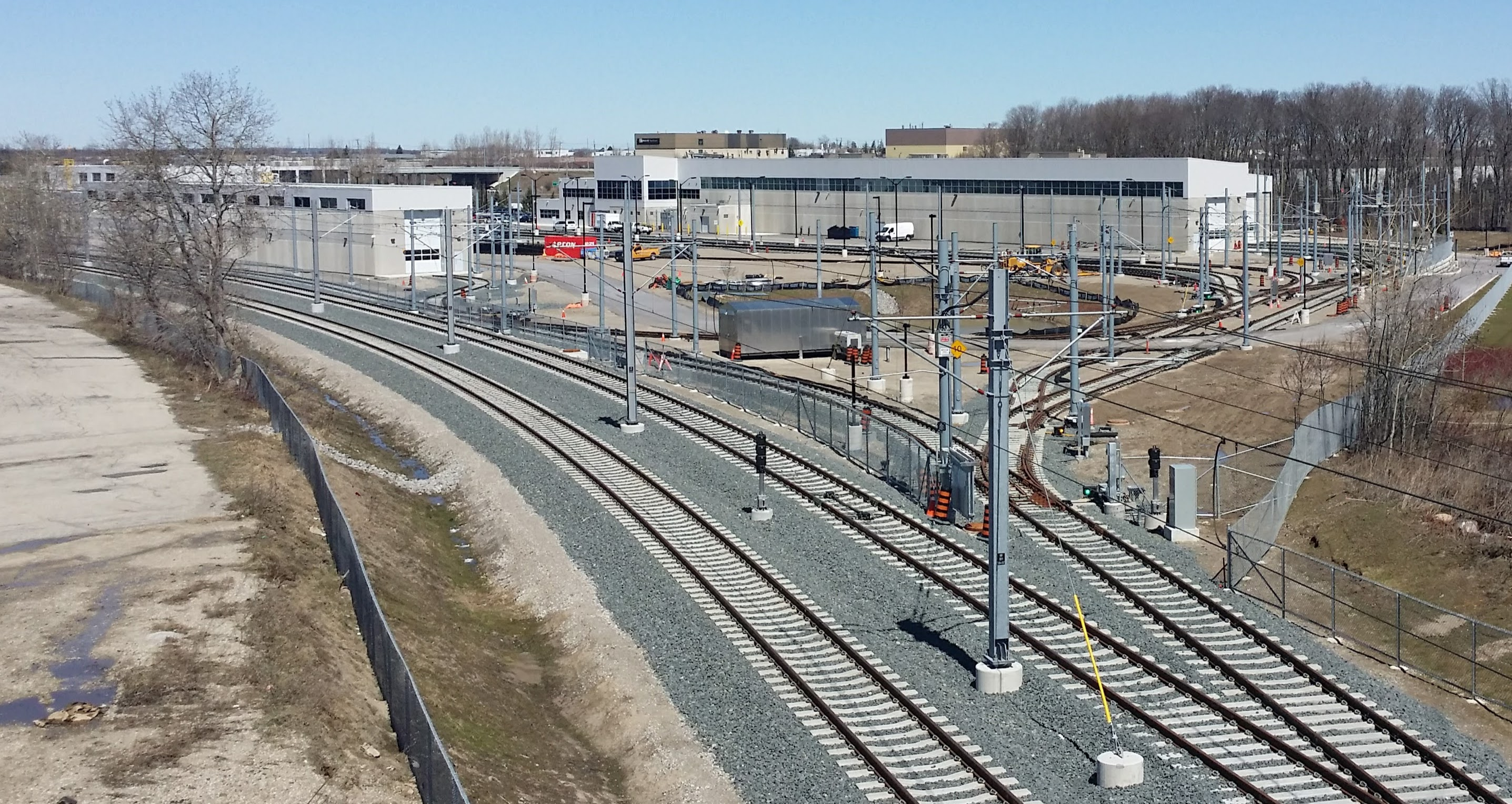
The system's Operations, Maintenance and Storage Facility (OMSF)

Ion light rail vehicles are in service between 5 am and midnight daily with a frequency of every 10 minutes from 6 am to 10 pm on weekdays and 15 minutes at other times. The route is properly known as 301 ION Light Rail.

The maximum operating speed of Ion light rail vehicles is 50 km/h (31 mph) along city streets and 70 km/h (43 mph) along railway rights of way. However, in areas where there is high pedestrian traffic, the operating speed will be as low as 20–25 km/h (12–16 mph). The 19-kilometre (12 mi) trip from Conestoga Mall to Fairview Park Mall is scheduled to take about 46 minutes for an average speed of about 25 km/h (16 mph). As a comparison, the average speed of Toronto's light rail Line 5 Eglinton will be 28 kilometres per hour (17 mph) and the average speed of subway Line 2 Bloor–Danforth is 32 kilometres per hour (20 mph). Note that while Ion operates completely on the surface, Line 5 is half underground, and Line 2 is completely grade-separated.

At street intersections, Ion light rail vehicles do not use the traditional automotive green-yellow-red traffic signals for road traffic, but rather the traditional two-aspect transit signals that show a vertical white bar for "go" and a horizontal white bar for "stop". Ion light rail vehicles have transit signal priority at intersections.

Where a street crosses the Ion tracks located either along a railway right of way or along the side of a cross road, the crossing is protected by traditional railway crossing signals: drop gates, flashing red lights and a bell. Crossings so protected are (from north to south) at Northfield Drive, Bearinger Road, Columbia Street, University Avenue, Seagram Drive and Erb Street in Waterloo, and at Ottawa Street, Mill Street, Hayward Avenue, Block Line Road, Courtland Avenue and Wilson Avenue in Kitchener.

The Ion fleet is stored and maintained at the Ion Operations, Maintenance and Storage Facility (OMSF) located on Dutton Drive in Waterloo.

=== Ion Bus service ===
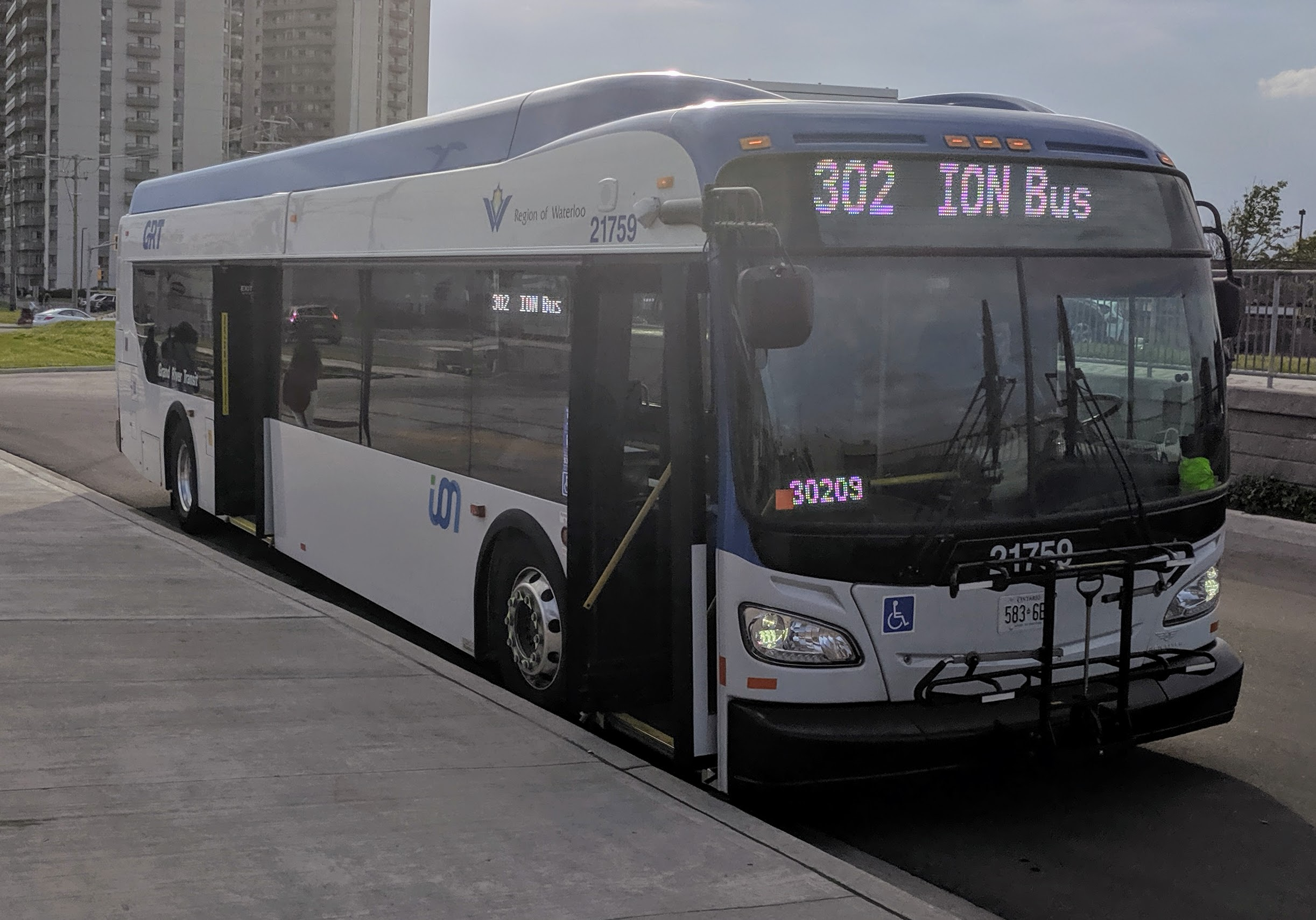
GRT Ion bus used on BRT service.

Because Stage 2 was still years away in March 2017, Grand River Transit was providing rapid transit between Fairview Park Mall and the Ainslie Street Transit Terminal (in the "downtown Galt" area) using iXpress buses. Adapted versions would become available in the near future for the Ion bus. Other stops are at Hespeler Road at the Delta, Can-Amera, Cambridge Centre, Pinebush, and Sportsworld. The rapid transit vehicles use bus-only lanes at Pinebush, Munch and Coronation to minimize slowdowns at times of heavy traffic. Following the launch of light rail Stage 1, the Ion bus provides a direct link to that system. This bus route is properly known as 302 Ion Bus. That service, termed "adapted bus rapid transit" runs in shared traffic lanes for most of the route, and fares are collected on board. It therefore does not meet the BRT Standard definition of bus rapid transit. No firm estimates had been published as to the possible start of (Stage 2) light rail service to Cambridge but a report in early July 2017 suggested that construction would not begin until 2025.

=== Freight trains ===
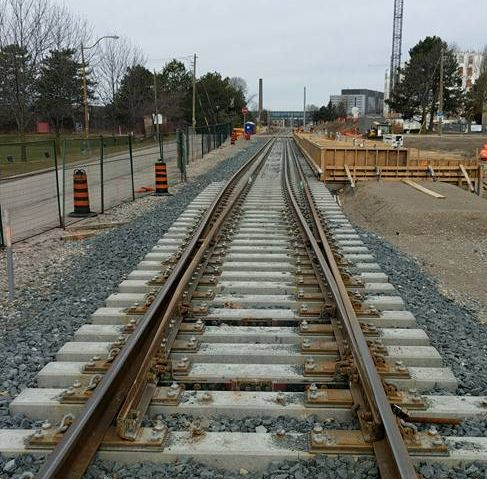
Gauntlet tracks at Laurier-Waterloo Park station.

Canadian National Railway freight trains use the shared portion of the Waterloo Spur between 11 pm and 5 am. After crossing King Street, the northbound freight train joins the northbound Ion track at Caroline Street, cross over to the southbound Ion track just north of Erb Street and then continue north on the southbound track until just south of Northfield Drive. This train typically heads north just after 11pm while Ion service is still running. Northbound Ion LRVs wait at Waterloo Public Square and southbound Ion LRVs wait at Northfield for the freight train to pass. The southbound return trip takes the reverse path and must return before Ion service starts at 5 am or they will have to wait until the next evening. This trip usually occurs Monday and Thursday nights but as with most freight schedules it can sometimes vary. Since freight cars are wider than the LRVs, there are gauntlet tracks at the southbound track of Ion stations along the Waterloo Spur to keep freight trains from striking the station platforms. To further protect station platforms and the Ion catenary system, there is a safety system to detect oversized freight cars and automatically stop the train using derailers. The detectors are located at Willow Street and just north of Northfield Drive.

== Route ==
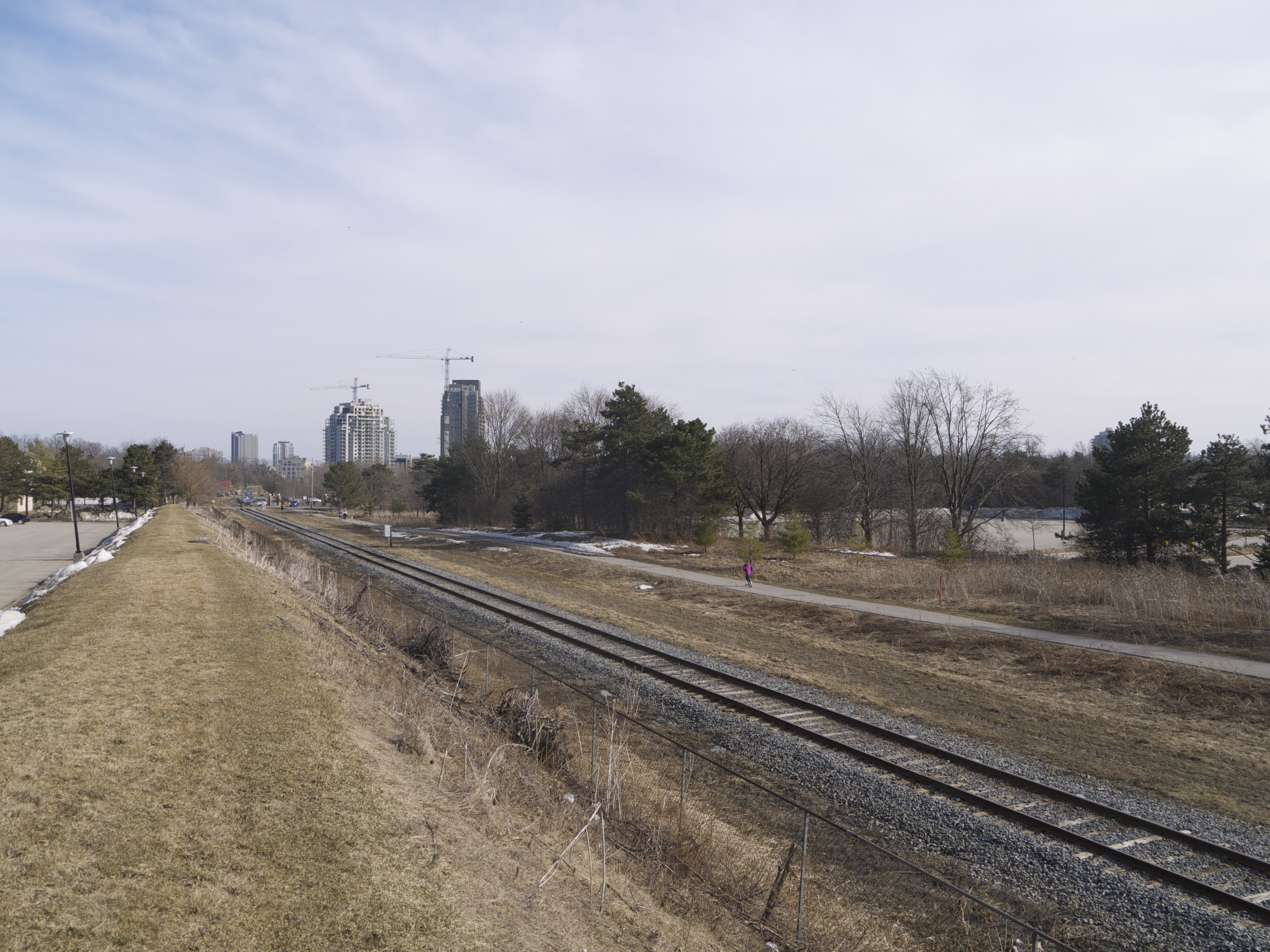
Waterloo Spur just south of University Avenue in April 2014, before construction started

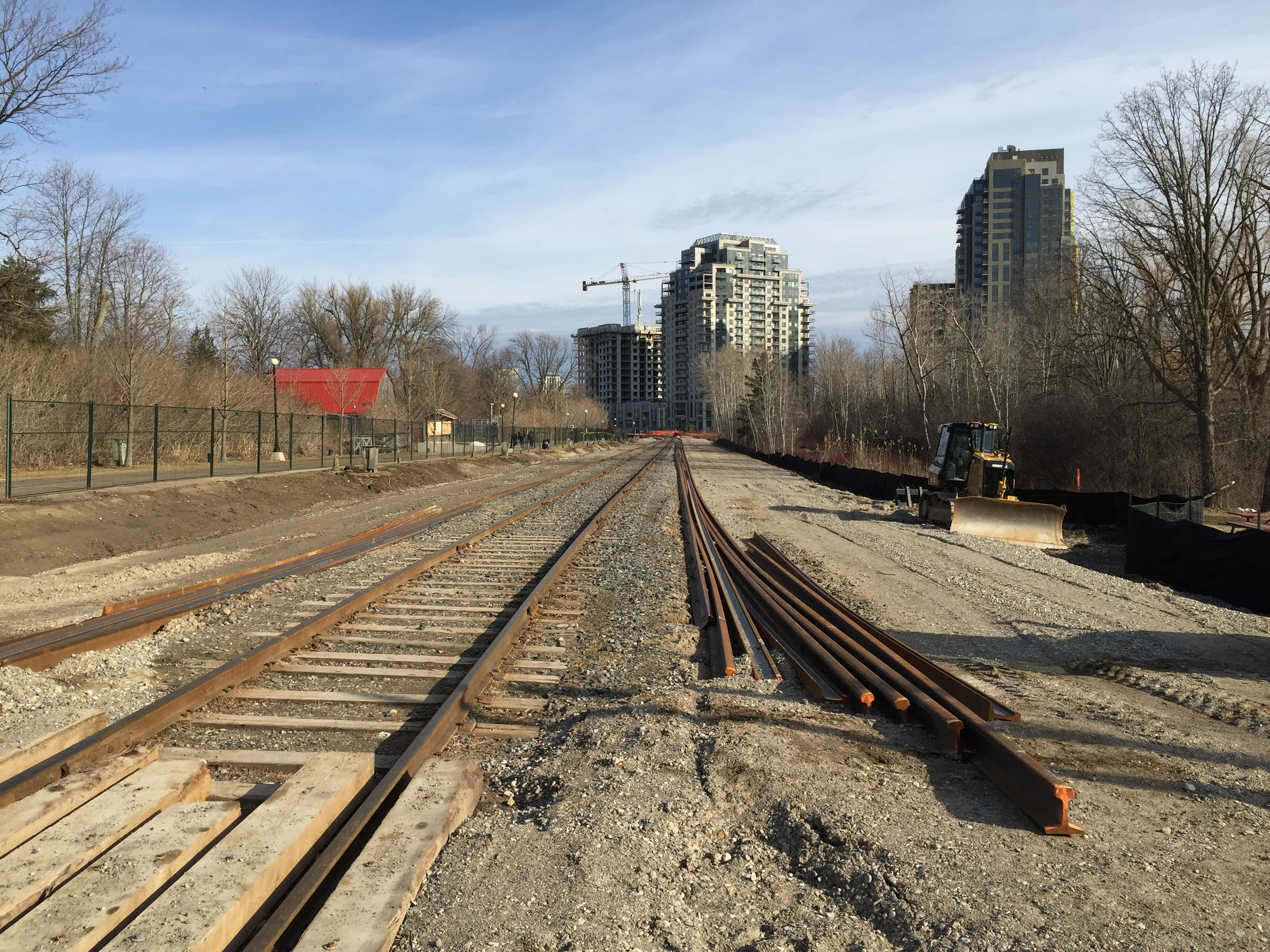
Construction work on Waterloo Spur in April 2015

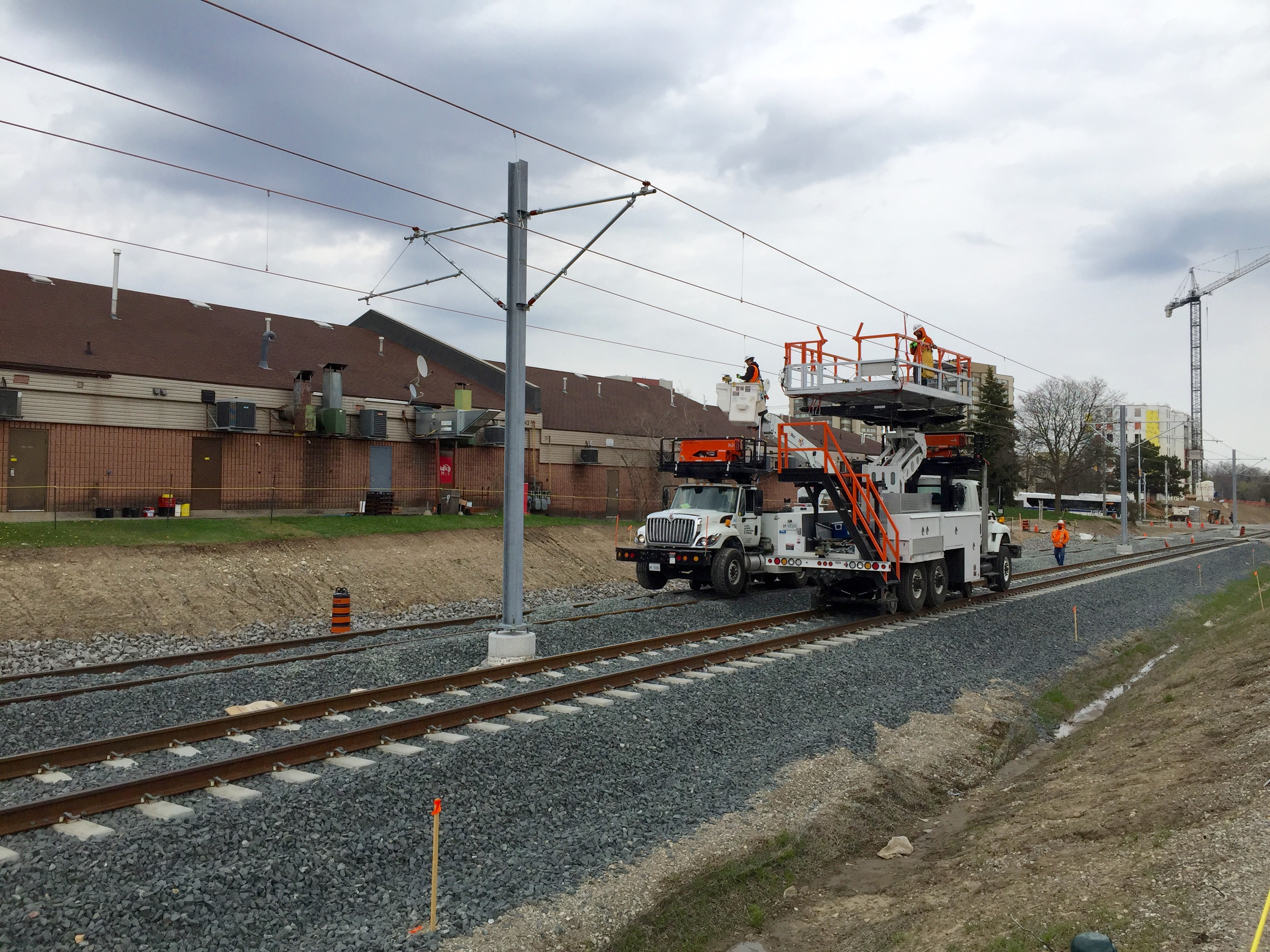
Electrification work near University of Waterloo campus in April 2016

The route approved by Regional Council travels in a mix of on-road and off-road (in various existing rights-of-way) configurations. On December 2, 2017, the Kitchener-Waterloo Record reported the local economy had already been stimulated through the construction of new buildings near the route, in both Kitchener–Waterloo and Cambridge.

=== Phase 1 ===
- On-road from Conestoga stop in Waterloo, the route follows King Street then west on Northfield Drive, using its existing bridge to cross the Conestoga Parkway, to the Region-owned rail spur line at Northfield stop.
- Off-road, it then follows the Region-owned rail spur line (also known as the Waterloo Spur) from Northfield Drive, passing the Research and Technology, University of Waterloo and Laurier - Waterloo Park stops to Uptown Waterloo, replacing the existing tracks. This line was used by the Waterloo Central Railway for revenue service until 2014 before their route was shortened to terminate north of Northfield Drive. This line continues to be used by CN, and remains open to freight traffic outside of transit service hours.
- On-road in Uptown Waterloo, it splits into a one-way system going north on King Street (location of the Waterloo Public Square stop) and south on Caroline Street (Willis Way stop), and along Allen Street to rejoin as a two-way system along King Street past Allen and Grand River Hospital stops. In Downtown Kitchener, the route splits at the Central Station stop (home to the future Transit Hub) into a one-way system going north on Duke and Frederick Streets (including Kitchener City Hall and Frederick stops) and south on Charles Street (Victoria Park and Queen), and back to a two-way system on Charles Street at Benton Street. From downtown Kitchener, the route follows Charles Street past Kitchener Market and Borden stops, then turns southwesternly taking a one-way system using Ottawa Street northbound and Borden Street southbound to Mill stop.
- Off-road, it then travels two-way along the CN rail right-of-way (alongside existing tracks to allow full freight access), under the Conestoga Parkway in a dedicated tunnel, beside Hayward Avenue, beside Courtland Avenue (past Block Line stop) and through the hydro corridor adjacent to Fairway Road, to Fairway stop.

=== Phase 2 ===
- Off-road From Fairview Park Mall the route then parallels the CPR rail line under Highway 8, over the Grand River, past Sportsworld station, under Highway 401, over the Speed River, to Eagle Street in Preston past Preston station, then the route paralles Eagle Street to Pinebush station
- On-road along Hespeler Road past Cambridge Centre and Can-Amera stations to Delta station, and on Water Street into Downtown Cambridge to Ainslie Terminal at Downtown Cambridge station.

On-road sections keep the LRVs in dedicated lanes that do not mix with general traffic.

== Stations ==
=== Ion light rail stations ===
As of May 2, 2024, ION 301 consists of 19 stations. The stations have been built to be the length of two LRVs; however, as only single vehicles are anticipated to be required initially, the major station facilities were only built for a single vehicle length at start. This consists of a cantilevered glass canopy over a mostly open waiting area; enclosures were built at most stations to provide some shelter. Each station is also recognizable by a 'feature wall', a 3-metre (9 ft 10 in) square installation near the end of the platform that carries a distinct colour scheme and pattern. The wall face is a series of large tiles in glass, ceramic or stone; at some stations, all tiles are the same, while others feature a unique pattern. Each wall features illuminated Ion and GRT logos, as well as the station's name set in Clearview. A second wall and canopy can be installed at the opposite end of each platform, and are planned to be erected when two light rail vehicle cars become the norm.

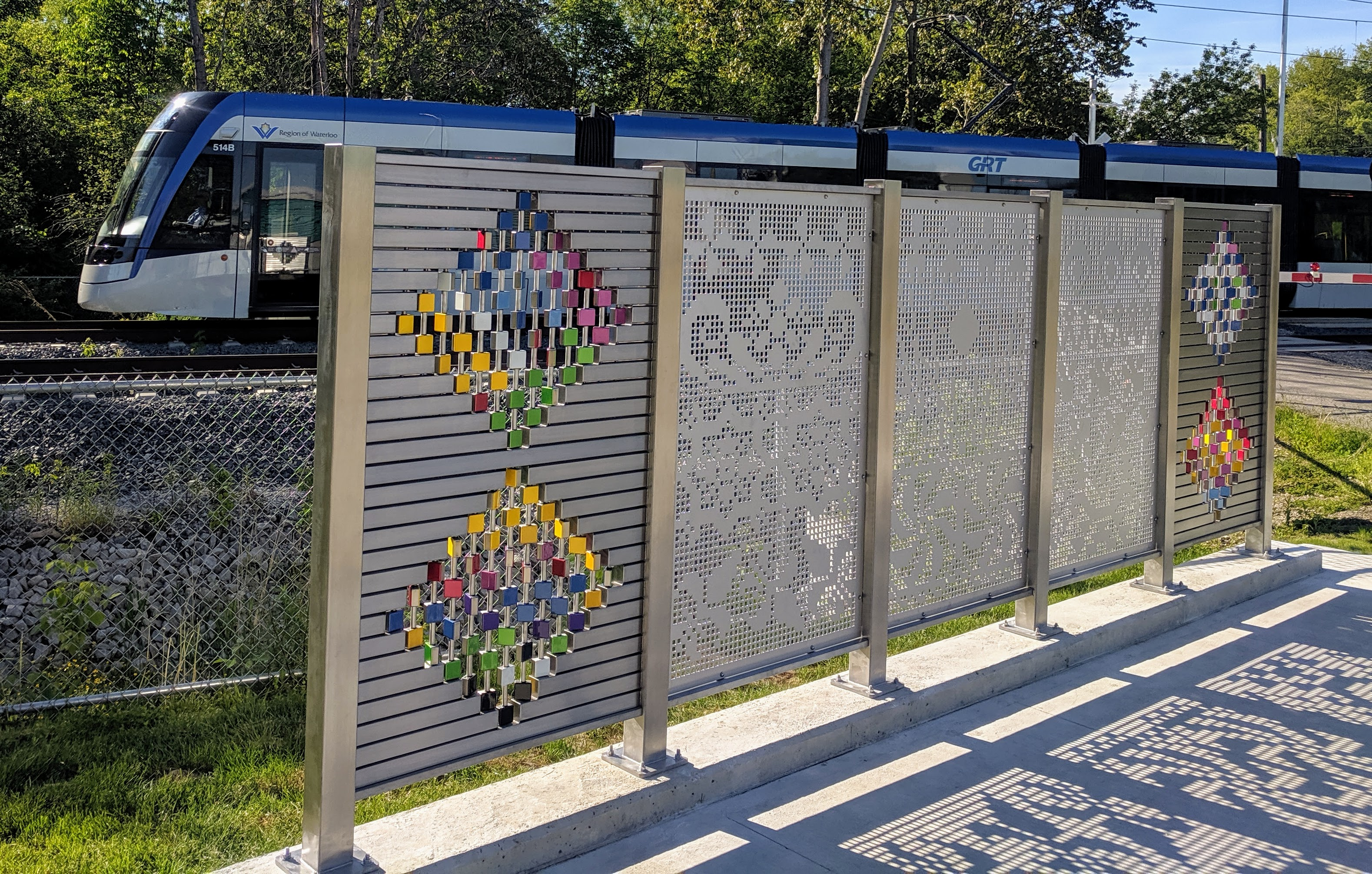
Fabric of Place sculpture

The design of each of the stops was focused on an 'anchor wall', a 4 metres (13 ft) square panel subdivided into smaller tiles of glass, ceramic or stone; each station has a unique wall design based on the surrounding architecture, landmarks and social character. There are ten public art installations within the Ion corridor with artworks at Conestoga, Research and Technology, Grand River Hospital, Kitchener Market, Mill, Block Line and Fairway. A further piece, Fabric of Place by Lilly Otasevic consisting of a panel with imaging representing the fabric of the community, is used as a barrier along the Ion track in Waterloo behind the Albert McCormick Community Centre, on Parkside Drive. Waterloo Region budgeted $875,000 for the artworks.

Image	Station	Location	Notes	Coords
	Conestoga	West of Conestoga Mall	Major transit interchange with connections to GRT and iXpress bus services	43.49829°N 80.52951°W
	Northfield	Rail corridor at Northfield Dr	Waterloo Central Railway terminates at this station	43.49722°N 80.54333°W
	Research and Technology	Rail corridor near bend in Wes Graham Way	Near the David Johnston Research and Technology Park	43.48136°N 80.54527°W
	University of Waterloo	University of Waterloo main campus	Across from Davis Centre along Ring Road / Laurel Trail	43.47312°N 80.54107°W
	Laurier–Waterloo Park	Rail corridor at Seagram Drive	Near Wilfrid Laurier University and Waterloo Park	43.46899°N 80.53450°W
	Waterloo Public Square	Rail corridor at King St	Northbound only	43.46414°N 80.52289°W
	Willis Way	Caroline St south of Willis Way	Southbound only	43.46228°N 80.52354°W
	Allen	King St at Allen St		43.46015°N 80.51886°W
	Grand River Hospital	King St at Pine St	In front of Grand River Hospital; near Kitchener–Waterloo Collegiate	43.45730°N 80.51217°W
	Central Station	King St at Victoria St	Transit hub will provide connections to GO Transit, Via Rail, and FlixBus services	43.45304°N 80.49874°W
	Kitchener City Hall	Duke St at Young St	Northbound only; near Kitchener City Hall	43.45202°N 80.49104°W
	Victoria Park	Charles St at Gaukel St	Southbound only; near Victoria Park	43.45016°N 80.49354°W
	Frederick	Frederick St at King St	Northbound only	43.44938°N 80.48748°W
	Queen	Charles St at Queen St	Southbound only	43.44871°N 80.48961°W
	Kitchener Market	Charles St at Cedar St	Near the Kitchener Farmer's Market and Cameron Heights Collegiate Institute	43.44648°N 80.48396°W
	Borden	Charles St at Borden Ave		43.44228°N 80.47501°W
	Mill	On the rail line by Ottawa St at Mill St		43.43395°N 80.47839°W
	Block Line	Courtland Ave at Block Line Rd	Near St. Mary's High School	43.42260°N 80.46263°W
	Fairway	West of CF Fairview Park	Southern terminus linked by Bus Rapid Transit to the Ainslie St. Transit Terminal; Park and Ride facility	43.42236°N 80.44194°W

=== Ion Bus stations ===
Image	Stop	Location	Notes	Coords
	Fairway		Connection to light rail	
	Sportsworld	Sportsworld Crossing	Connections to GO services	43.41018°N 80.39245°W
	Pinebush	Hespler Rd at Pinebush Rd		43.40774°N 80.32777°W
	Cambridge Centre	Cambridge Centre Terminal	Beside Cambridge Centre	43.39286°N 80.32215°W
	Can-Amera	Hespler Rd at Can-Amera Pkwy		43.385810°N 80.320900°W
	Delta	Hespler Rd at Coronation Blvd		43.37285°N 80.31801°W
	Ainslie	Ainslie St. Terminal	Main Cambridge transfer hub for GRT services in Cambridge	43.35751°N 80.31326°W

== Rolling stock ==
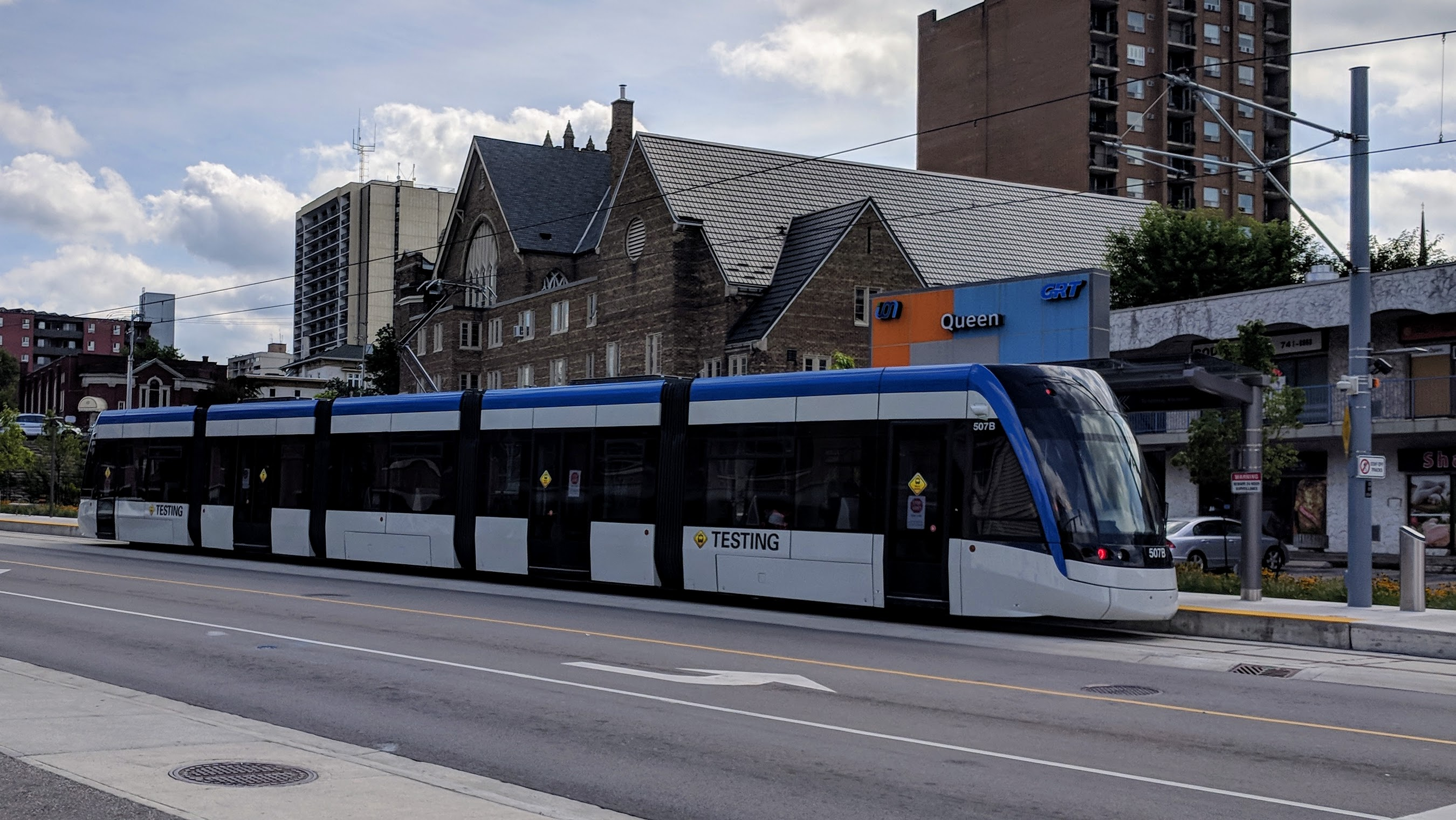
Ion vehicle at Queen station during testing in August 2018

On July 10, 2013, it was reported that a deal was finalized with Metrolinx to join its contract with Bombardier Transportation for the purchase of 14 Flexity Freedom LRVs to form the system's initial fleet, with an option to purchase up to 14 more as the need arises. A further report on July 12, 2013, stated that the region would be purchasing 14 LRVs, with an option to buy 16 more.

The 14 vehicles are estimated to cost $92.4 million, an average of $6.6 million per vehicle. The cost breakdown is:

- vehicles – $61.1 million
- spare parts – $6.5 million
- tools and equipment, taxes, currency exchange – $7 million
- contingencies – $11 million in contingencies.

Each 30-metre (98 ft)-long, 30-tonne vehicle has 56 seats and a standing capacity of 144 passengers. The body is constructed of five sections, in an accordion-like configuration to allow for sharp turns. It can be driven from either end. The top speed is 88 km/h (55 mph) but the average travel speed is unlikely to exceed 50 km/h (31 mph).

The vehicles are numbered with a three-digit unit number in the 5xx series beginning with 501. This fleet number is displayed prominently on the end modules of each vehicle followed by a single letter to denote which end module the fleet number is on (e.g. 503A, 507B). The vehicles are being used for testing at the maintenance facility and all 19 km (12 mi) of the completed track.

=== Vehicle delivery and testing ===
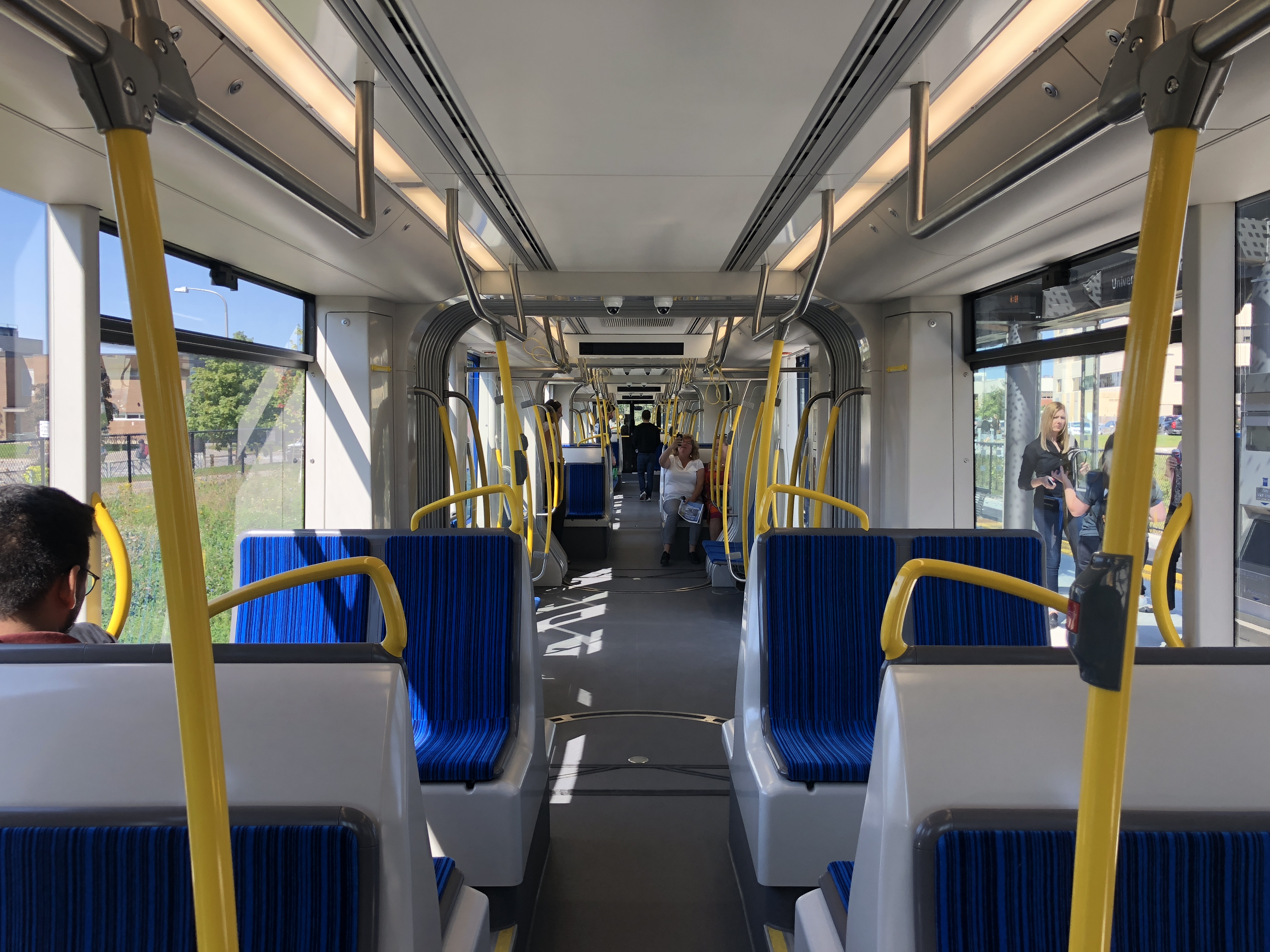
Interior of Ion vehicle 506

Production of the new vehicles was expected to begin in 2015 with the first to be delivered no later than August 2016 and all vehicles were to be received by the end of 2016. On April 13, 2016, it was reported that Bombardier had informed the transit authority that delivery of the vehicles would be delayed.

The region entered a joint agreement with Metrolinx and Bombardier in July 2013 for 14 LRVs, as well as an option to buy up to 14 more. Under the original agreement, the first vehicle was to be delivered no later than August 2016, and the final vehicle by December 2016.

On May 20, 2016, Bombardier announced that to avoid further delays it would shift construction of the vehicles for the Ion system from its Thunder Bay plant to another plant in Kingston, Ontario.

The first vehicle, number 501 (its ends are labelled 501A and 501B), arrived in Waterloo Region on February 24, 2017. However, it was not ready for testing as its operating software was incomplete. By mid-March 2017, the second to fifth vehicles were seen by a CTV reporter as under construction in the Kingston plant. Testing of vehicle 501 was scheduled to commence in May 2017 on the line between Northfield Drive and Silver Lake.

In early April 2017, the Region expected to receive a second LRV in June or July, but that was postponed to late August or early September. By the beginning of October 2017, the second LRV had arrived. The schedule then called for delivery of another each 15 days, for a total of 14 by year end. The year end target was missed.

On November 7, 2017, unpowered vehicle testing began on the tracks between Northfield Drive and Erb Street. An LRV was towed to check track clearances including along station platforms and to ensure continuous pantograph contact with the overhead electrical wiring.

On December 19, 2017, GrandLinq had its first successful test of a Flexity Freedom running under its own power at the Ion maintenance facility. The two-hour test was done at the speed of 10 km/h (6.2 mph) and "apparently went quite well", according to Coun. Tom Galloway. In 2018, testing beyond the maintenance facility was scheduled to start. By this date, Waterloo Region had three LRVs on site, which is the minimum number required to do an adequate test of the system.

A CBC report on December 21, 2017, indicated that the fourth vehicle was expected to be delivered before year-end. Six others were in final production and four were still in the assembly process. After the fourth vehicle was received in January, the first one was returned to Kingston for some additional work. At that time, five others were being tested by Bombardier. According to the schedule, the fourteenth and last LRV was expected to be delivered in February 2018 with full LRT service expected to start in spring 2018; however, this later became a June final delivery, with service start in December, then later to June 21, 2019. The final LRVs were delivered on December 6, 2018.

At a Regional council meeting on May 8, 2019, it was announced that the service would launch the following month, on June 21, 2019; service across all of Grand River Transit, both LRT and bus, was to be free of charge for 11 days, until Canada Day.

In August 2020, it was confirmed that part of a compensation package from Bombardier to settle shipping delays would be a fifteenth unit, provided free of charge, for the Ion fleet. It was delivered early March 2021.

== Services ==
Ion light rail and Ion Bus both run with 10-minute headways on weekdays, with headways being 15-minutes on weekends.

=== Fares ===
GRT uses proof-of-payment system for fare collection. Fares can be paid with an EasyGO contactless smart card or the GRT Pay app. Eligible students attending the University of Waterloo or Wilfred Laurier University can use their student identity card. Ion Buses also accept cash.

== See also ==
- Urban rail transit in Canada
- Rail transport in Ontario
- Public transport in Canada
