= GrandLinq =

Rapid transit consortium

The consortium named GrandLinq is the successful bidder to build and operate the Ion rapid transit system in Waterloo Region, Ontario. GrandLinq was one of three groups invited to bid on the system in February 2013. GrandLinq's partners include: Plenary Group Canada; Meridiam Infrastructure Waterloo; Aecon; Kiewit; Mass Electric Construction Canada; Keolis; STV Canada Construction; AECOM; and CIBC World Markets.

In 2012, seven groups of partners indicated an interest in bidding on the system. In February, GrandLinq and two other groups, Tricity Transit System and Kitchener Waterloo Cambridge Transit Partners, were chosen as those which would be invited to submit proposals. In June the formal request for proposal was issued, and the three groups had until December to complete their bids.

In March 2014, GrandLinq was identified as the preferred bidder in the staff report on the final bids, and approved by the Region's Planning and Works committee. Regional Council gave final approval on March 19, with financial close being made May 9.
