= Plenary Group =

Australian company

- Company type: Private
- Industry: Infrastructure Investment
- Founded: 2004
- Headquarters: Melbourne
- Area served: Asia; Australia; Canada; Europe; Middle East; New Zealand; United States; United Kingdom
- AUM: ▲ A$58 billion (2022)
- Owner: CDPQ
- Divisions: Plenary Americas; Plenary Asia and Middle East; Plenary Australia and New Zealand; Plenary UK and Europe
- Website: plenary.com

Plenary Group is an independent long term investor, developer and manager of public infrastructure, specialising in public–private partnerships. It was founded in 2004 by three former ABN Amro employees, with Deutsche Bank taking a 20% shareholding.

== Operations ==
Projects which it has been involved in include:

=== Australia ===
- G:link
- Melbourne Convention and Exhibition Centre
- Northwest Rapid Transit
- Toowoomba Second Range Crossing
- Victorian Comprehensive Cancer Centre
- High Capacity Metro Trains

=== Canada ===
- GrandLinq
- Humber River Regional Hospital
- Milton District Hospital

=== United States ===
- Plenary Roads Denver - first U.S. project: 2014-2016 Denver-Boulder US36 Express Lanes

== Criticism and controversies ==
=== Humber River Health lawsuit ===
In June 2025, a consortium led by Plenary became the subject of a $100 million lawsuit filed by the Humber River Hospital, alleging negligent design and construction practices. The hospital alleged that a "sizeable portion" of the facility's floors are not level or flat, are deteriorating and such conditions have required the hospital to take extra precautions for patients and equipment safety as a result. Plenary Health Care Partnerships was contracted by the Government of Ontario to operate and maintain the hospital for a 30 year period.
