= Conestoga Mall =

Shopping mall in Waterloo, Ontario

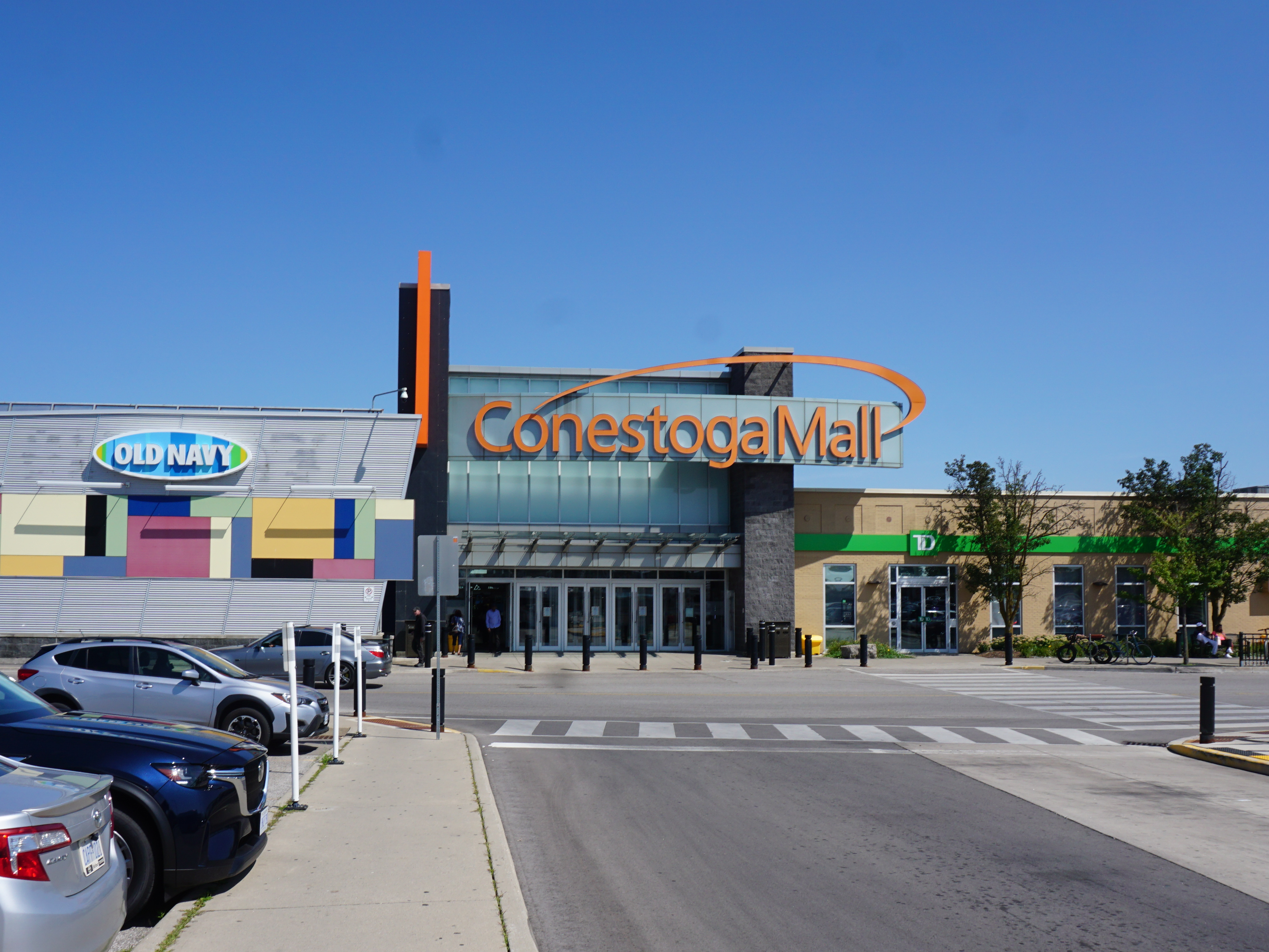
- Location: Waterloo, Ontario, Canada
- Coordinates: 43°29′53.37″N 80°31′37.22″W
- Address: 550 King Street North
- Opened: 1978; 48 years ago
- Developer: Select Properties Limited
- Manager: Primaris REIT
- Owner: Primaris REIT
- Num. of stores: 130 (+14 food court)
- Num. of anchor tenants: 3
- Floor area: 681,272 sq ft (63,292.2 m^{2})
- Floors: 1
- Public transit: Conestoga station
- Website: conestogamall.com

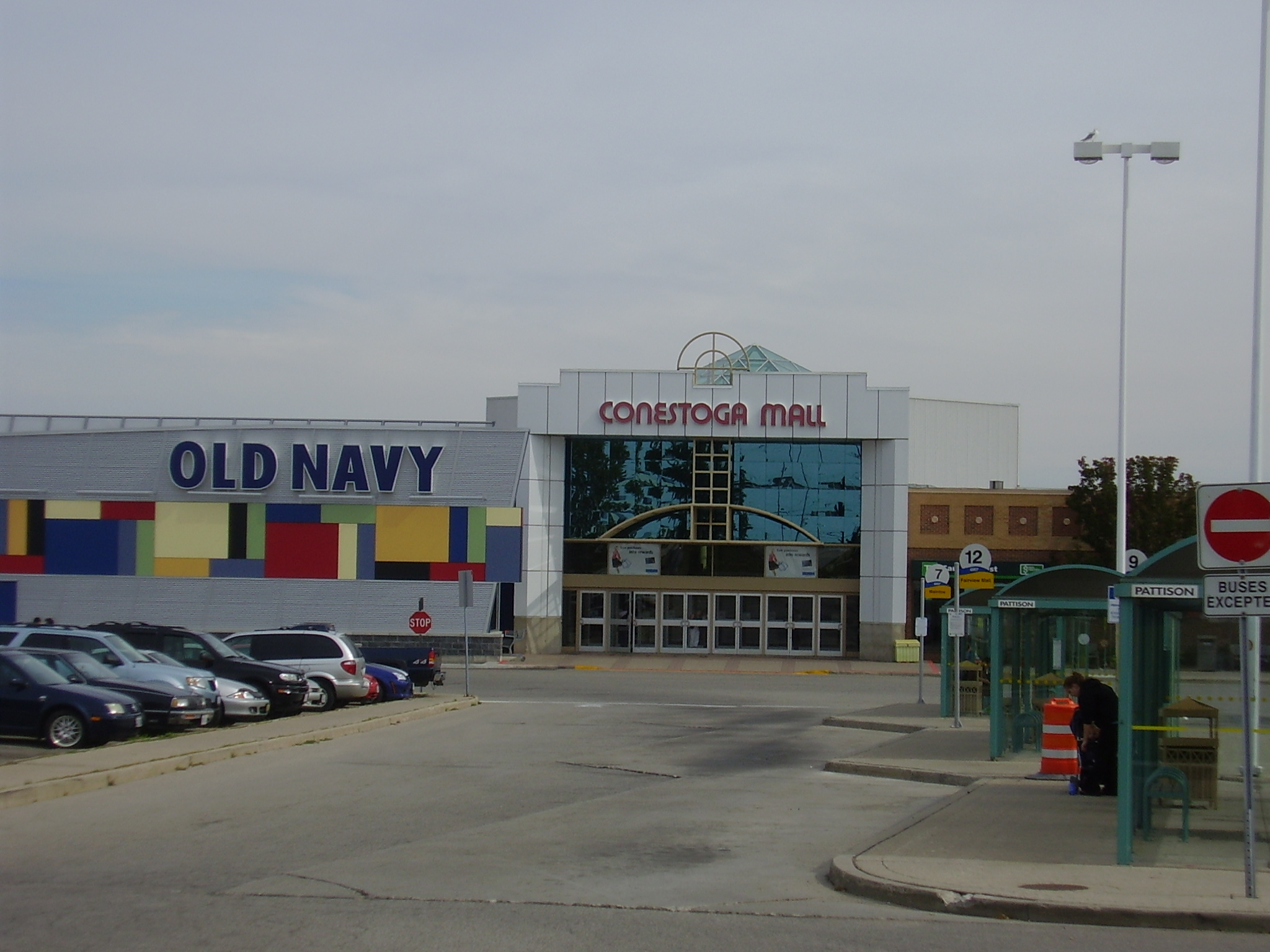
Entrance on the west side of the mall

Conestoga Mall is a shopping mall located at 550 King Street North in Waterloo, Ontario, Canada. Located at King Street's interchange with the Conestoga Parkway, it is the largest shopping centre in Waterloo, and third-largest in Waterloo Region. The mall is owned and operated by Primaris REIT.

Conestoga Mall has over 130 stores and services. The mall has a Food Court featuring 13 vendors and a Galaxy Cinema. Anchor tenants include Zehrs, Galaxy Cinemas, Winners, Sport Chek, Old Navy, and Shoppers Drug Mart . The mall, built in 1978, was one of the only buildings on this section of King Street. Since it opened, the mall has been expanded several times, and has contributed to the retail success of this area. Several big box retailers have opened on King Street North around the mall.

== Acquisition by Primaris REIT ==
In June 2023 Primaris REIT announced an intention to acquire the mall for $270 million from Ivanhoé Cambridge. The transaction closed in July 2023.

== Redevelopment ==
Conestoga Mall underwent a major $75 million redevelopment project. The project began in mid-2006, and was completed in the spring of 2010. Details of the project include a 130,000-square-foot (12,000 m^{2}) expansion on the south end of the property, a renovation and upgrade to the existing building, a new 700-seat food court with a new south end mall entrance, and a pedestrian-friendly façade.

The redevelopment was also to include significant traffic improvements to the King Street entrance of the mall. The intersection of Conestogo Road and Kraus Drive were replaced with a roundabout at the City of Waterloo's request. A second entrance was added to King Street in the form of a right in-right out intersection. The traffic upgrades were paid for by Ivanhoé Cambridge as a condition of the City of Waterloo issuing a building permit for the expansion of the shopping centre.

=== The Bay ===
The Bay (now "Hudson's Bay") was moved slightly to the south and was completely rebuilt into a larger store. The new prototype Bay at Conestoga Mall was the first "green" store in the company's portfolio - complete with environmentally-conscious measures such as solar panels, wind turbines, recycled carpet, and waterless urinals. The company also introduced higher end products such as Chanel cosmetics to serve Waterloo's growing affluence. It closed in June 2025, due to the chain's bankruptcy.

=== City of Waterloo Museum ===
Conestoga Mall donated 4,000 square feet (370 m^{2}) in the new expansion to the City of Waterloo to establish a permanent museum for the city's heritage artifacts. Over 10,000 of the city's historical artifacts will be displayed in the City of Waterloo Museum. Waterloo's heritage collection has been mainly in storage over the past decade, with most of these artifacts coming from the closure of the Seagram Museum. The City of Waterloo Museum will be located between the new Bay store and food court entrance.

== Environmental commitment ==
Conestoga Mall supports green electricity, purchasing 30% of its common area electricity requirements from Bullfrog Power.

== Loblaw Superstore controversy ==
Loblaw Companies, which operates the Zehrs chain of grocery stores, has owned a large parcel of land to the southwest of Conestoga Mall.

Despite much controversy with local citizens and the City of Waterloo, Loblaw planned to close the Conestoga Mall Zehrs and replace it with a much larger approximately 16,300-square-metre (175,000 sq ft) Real Canadian Superstore. In September 2008, Loblaw sold its land holding to Intelligent Mechatronics Systems, a high tech company for $14.5 million.

On June 10, 2024, Primaris REIT bought the Zehr’s and associated lands for $19.7 million

== Anchors & Retail mix ==
=== anchors ===
- Galaxy Cinemas
- Zehrs Markets

=== junior anchors ===
- H&M
- Indigo Books and Music
- Old Navy
- Shoppers Drug Mart
- Sport Chek
- Winners

=== region's first ===
- Apple Store
- Browns Shoes
- Chipotle
- Kiokii and
- Levi's
- Lululemon
- Miniso
- Nespresso
- Swatch
- The Pickle Barrel

=== former anchors ===
- Hudson’s Bay (closed along with the rest of the chain in June 2025)
- Target Canada (redeveloped into multiple stores which includes Indigo Books and Music, Sport Chek and Miniso)
- Zellers (converted to Target)

== See also ==
- CF Fairview Park Mall
- Cambridge Centre
