= Fairview Park Mall =

Shopping mall in Kitchener, Ontario

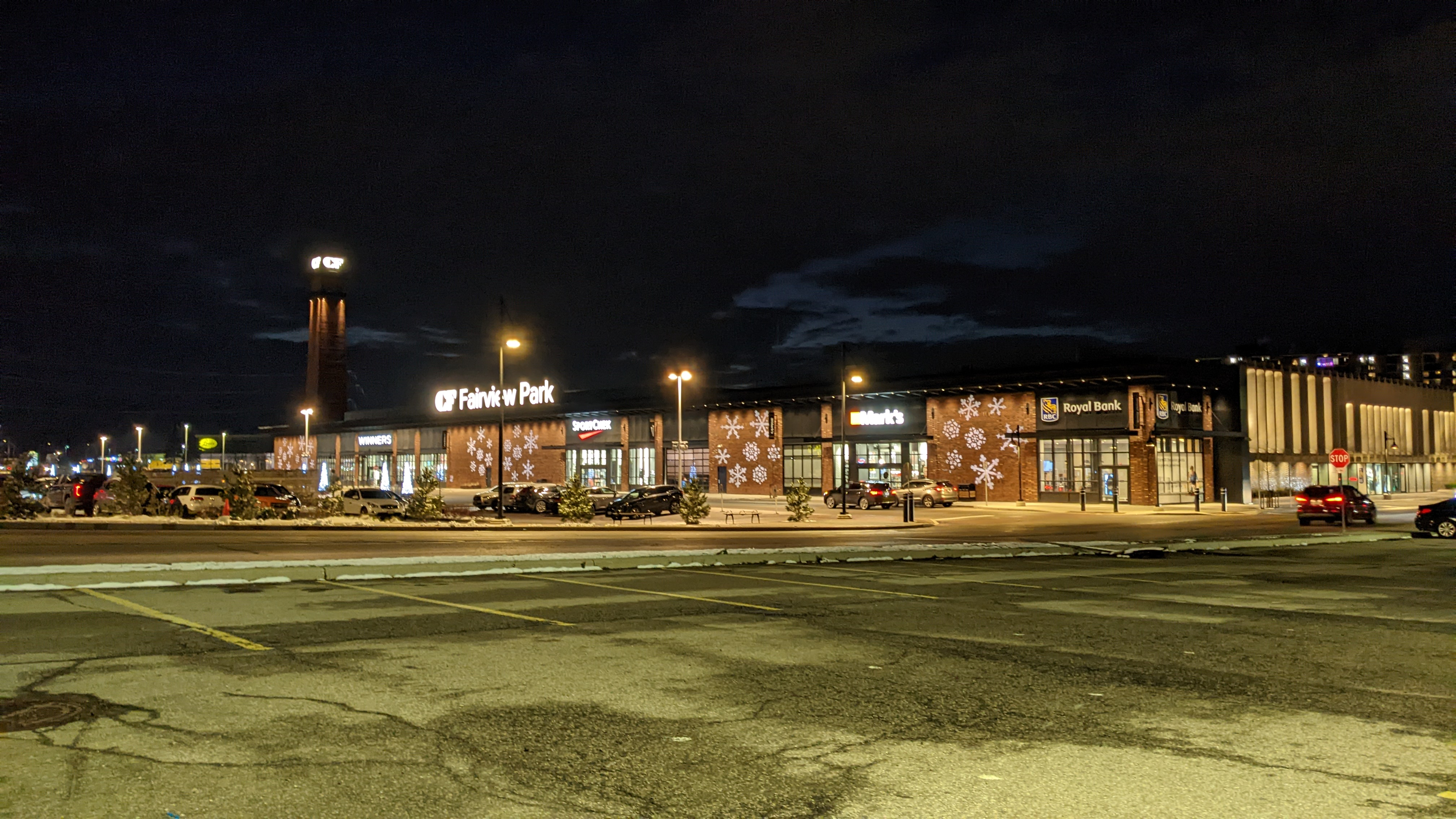
- Coordinates: 43.42487°N 80.43859°W
- Address: 2960 Kingsway Drive; Kitchener, Ontario, Canada; N2C 1A9
- Opened: 1966; 60 years ago
- Manager: Westcliff Management Ltd.
- Owner: Westcliff Management Ltd.
- Num. of stores: 120
- Num. of anchor tenants: 1
- Floor area: 746,334 sq ft (69,336.7 m^{2})
- Floors: 1
- Public transit: Fairway station
- Website: www.fairviewparkmall.com

Fairview Park (commonly known as Fairview Park Mall) is a large shopping mall of 120 stores in Kitchener, Ontario, Canada, owned and managed by Westcliff Management Ltd. The anchor store is a Walmart Supercentre, with two large anchor spaces, with one last occupied by Sears, divided into multiple stores including Winners, Sport Chek, Mark's, and an RBC branch which opened in 2021, with the rest of vacant space planned for redevelopment in the future, and the other last occupied by Hudson's Bay which is currently vacant.

Kingsway Drive bounds CF Fairview Park to the north, Wilson Avenue to the west, Fairway Road to the south, and Highway 8 to the east. Its presence over the years has turned Fairway Road into a major commercial strip. Out of the four malls in the Region, Fairview Park is the largest at 730,000 square feet (68,000 m^{2}) of gross leasable area.

The mall is also a significant public transit hub in Waterloo Region. Fairway station, located just west of the mall, is the terminus for many Grand River Transit bus routes as well as the southern terminal of the Ion rapid transit system, which recently started operating in June 2019.

== History ==
Fairview Park opened in 1966 in the Parkway neighbourhood of the recently expanded City of Kitchener. A Simpsons-Sears department store had opened in August 1965, predating the mall's opening by a year, with the rest of the mall being constructed around it.

The initial anchors were Simpsons-Sears at the south end and a Zehrs supermarket at the north. A new wing with Woolco was added on the east in August 1967 along with a dozen of stores. Simpsons on the west was added in August 1975 along with 50 more stores. In the time since, Simpsons-Sears has become Sears, Woolco was converted to a Walmart, and Simpsons became The Bay. The small Zehrs supermarket had been located facing Kingsway Drive but moved to an outdoor plaza on Weber Street on the other side of Highway 8 (occupying the space of the former "HiWay Market" supermarket). Its area was redeveloped, partially into the current food court and partially into a PharmaPlus location (which later closed).

From early 2007 to that summer, the mall underwent a major $33.4-million redevelopment. This renovation included a new food court and interiors, including high ceilings. The parking lot was also refurbished. It was the first major renovation since 1986.

On December 3, 2024, Cadillac Fairview officially sold the property to Westcliff, a development company based in Montreal. The amount for the purchase was undisclosed.

In March 2025, Hudson's Bay Company began liquidating 74 of its 80 Hudson's Bay department stores. Ruby Liu, a property investment manager announced a bid to purchase 25 former Hudson's Bay leases with intentions to launch her own chain of Ruby Liu department stores. Majority of landlords for 23 of those 25 properties the leases sits on have strongly opposed Liu's proposal. The Fairview Park location was one of those 25 listed and subject to court approval. On 24 October, the court sided with landlords and rejected Liu's bid to acquire the 23 disputed store leases.

== Retailers ==
=== Anchors ===
The main department anchor of the mall is Walmart Supercentre. Junior anchors include Winners, Sport Chek, Mark's (these were built out of the former Sears building), H&M, Urban Behavior, Linen Chest, Hollister Co., and JD Sports. Outside the mall lies an outdoor retail complex which includes Cineplex Cinemas and VIP, Indigo Books and Music, Party City and the region's first Chick-fil-A.

=== Former anchors/retailers ===
- American Eagle Outfitters (now JD Sports)
- Forever 21 (now Urban Behavior)
- Gap/Gap Kids (now H&M)
- Hudson's Bay
- Sears (divided into Winners, Sport Chek, Mark's, and an RBC branch)
- Simpsons (converted to Hudson's Bay)
- Woolco (converted to Walmart, now a Walmart Supercentre)
- Zehrs

== Food court ==
Fairview Park Mall has a large food court with various multicultural options ranging from American fast food to east Asian cuisine. Notable restaurants include KFC, A&W, Famous Wok, Tim Hortons, Subway, and Bourbon Street Grill. Standalone restaurants include Jack Astor's Bar and Grill and The Canadian Brewhouse.

== Area/Location ==
Fairview Park Mall is situated on Fairway Road, in close proximity to the Traynor/Vanier and Centreville neighbourhoods, and just a 5-minute drive from downtown Kitchener, Ontario. With a population of 14,000, this area is one of the largest neighbourhoods in the Region.

== Transit Terminal ==
Fairview Park Mall is home to a central transit terminal. A bus terminal used to be located beside the southwest entrance of the former Hudson's Bay store. This facility served as a significant hub for Grand River Transit (GRT), with most of the routes terminating there. The Region's Ion rapid transit system now also services this area at the Fairway station, which has its associated bus connections. When the station came online in June 2019, the existing terminal closed.

== See also ==
- Cambridge Centre
- Conestoga Mall
