= Conestoga station =

Light rail station and bus terminal in Waterloo, Ontario

Conestoga
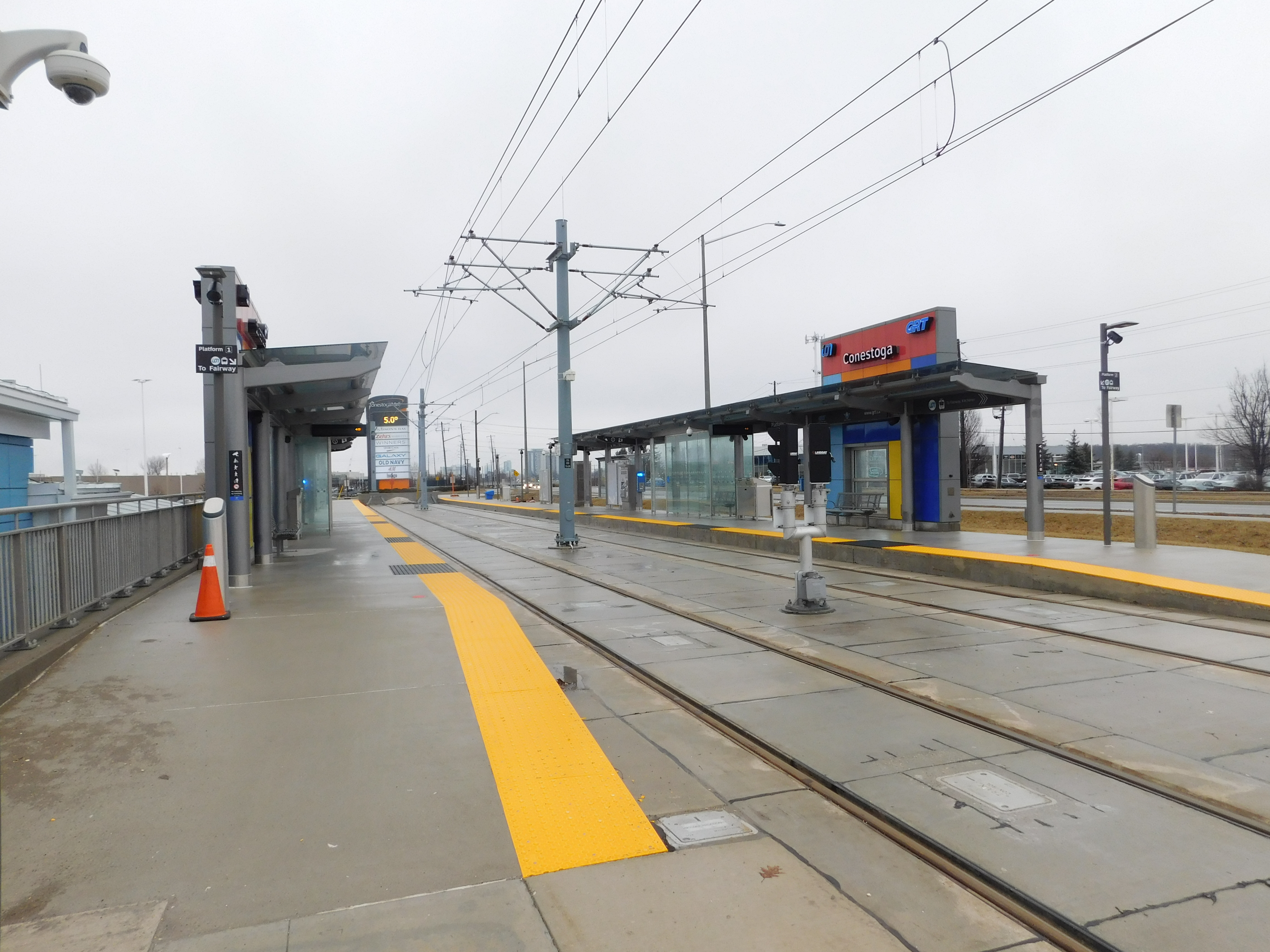
- The completed light rail station in March 2019

General information
- Location: Waterloo, Ontario; Canada
- Coordinates: 43°29′53″N 80°31′45″W
- Platforms: Side platforms
- Tracks: 2
- Bus stands: 10
- Connections: GRT buses: 201 iXpress Fischer–Hallman; 202 iXpress University; 6 Bridge–Courtland; 7 King; 9 Lakeshore; 14 Bathurst; 21 Elmira; 29 Keats–University; 31 Columbia; PC Connect: 1 K/W – Elmira – Listowel; 2 K/W – Stratford – St. Marys

Construction
- Accessible: Yes

History
- Opened: 1996 (bus terminal); June 21, 2019 (LRT)

Services
Preceding station	Grand River Transit	Following station
Terminus	Ion	Northfield toward Fairway
Location

Conestoga station is located beside the King Street entrance on the westerly side of Conestoga Mall in Waterloo, Ontario. This facility operates as a major transit terminal for Grand River Transit (GRT) buses, with all of the routes that it serves terminating here. Perth County Connect buses, serving Stratford, Perth County and London, also serve the station via a stop on King Street.

Conestoga is also the northern terminus of the Region of Waterloo's Ion rapid transit system, which opened on June 21, 2019.

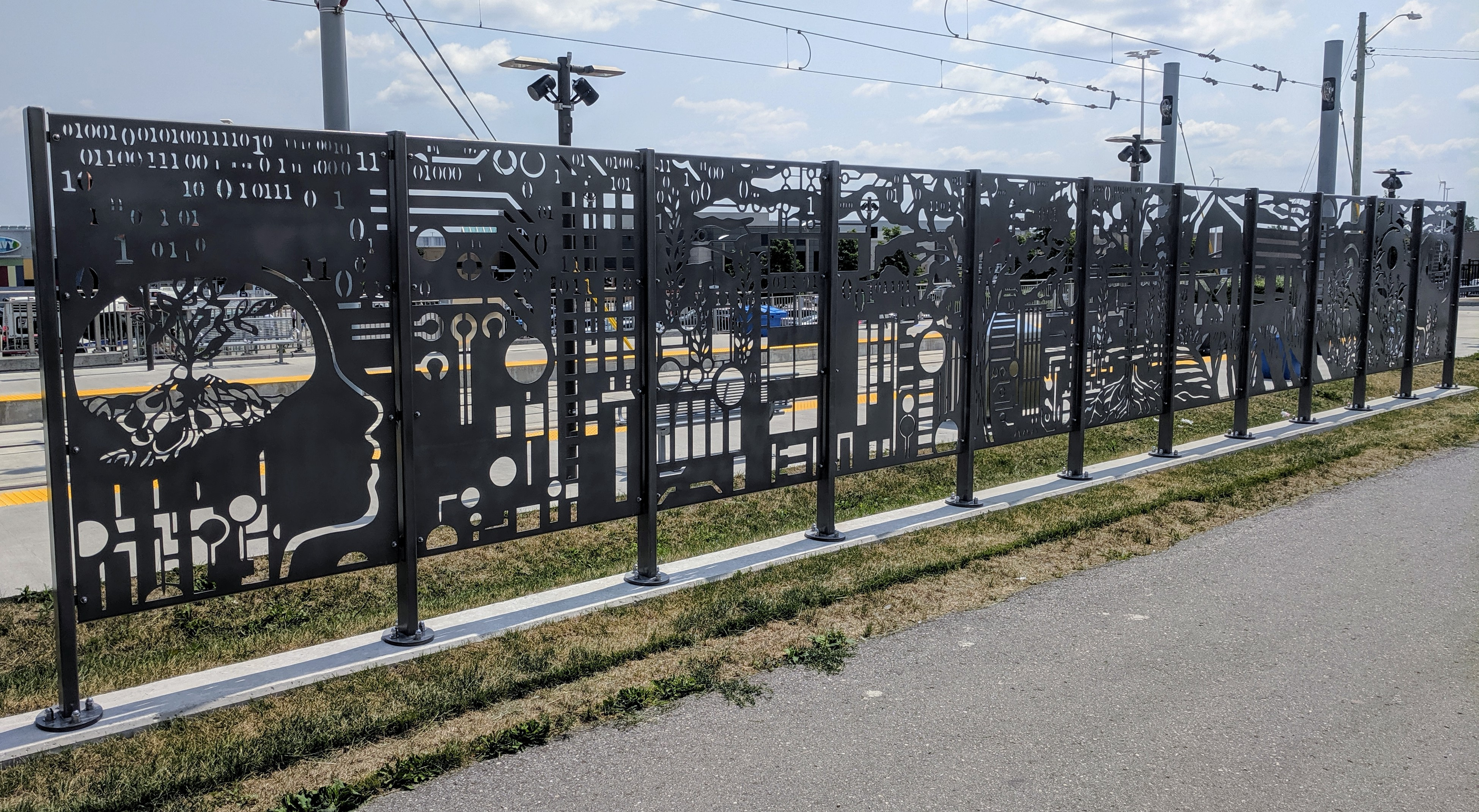
Continuum

Access to the LRT platforms is primarily from the north, where both a stairway and ramp lead down to the bus terminal; the King Street sidewalk can also be reached. Sidewalk access is also available from the south end of the platforms.

The station's feature walls consist of ceramic tiles in a pattern of red, orange, blue, teal, and yellow.

The station features the artwork Continuum by Catherine Paleczny about the continuum of communities and the progression of time.

== Bus services ==
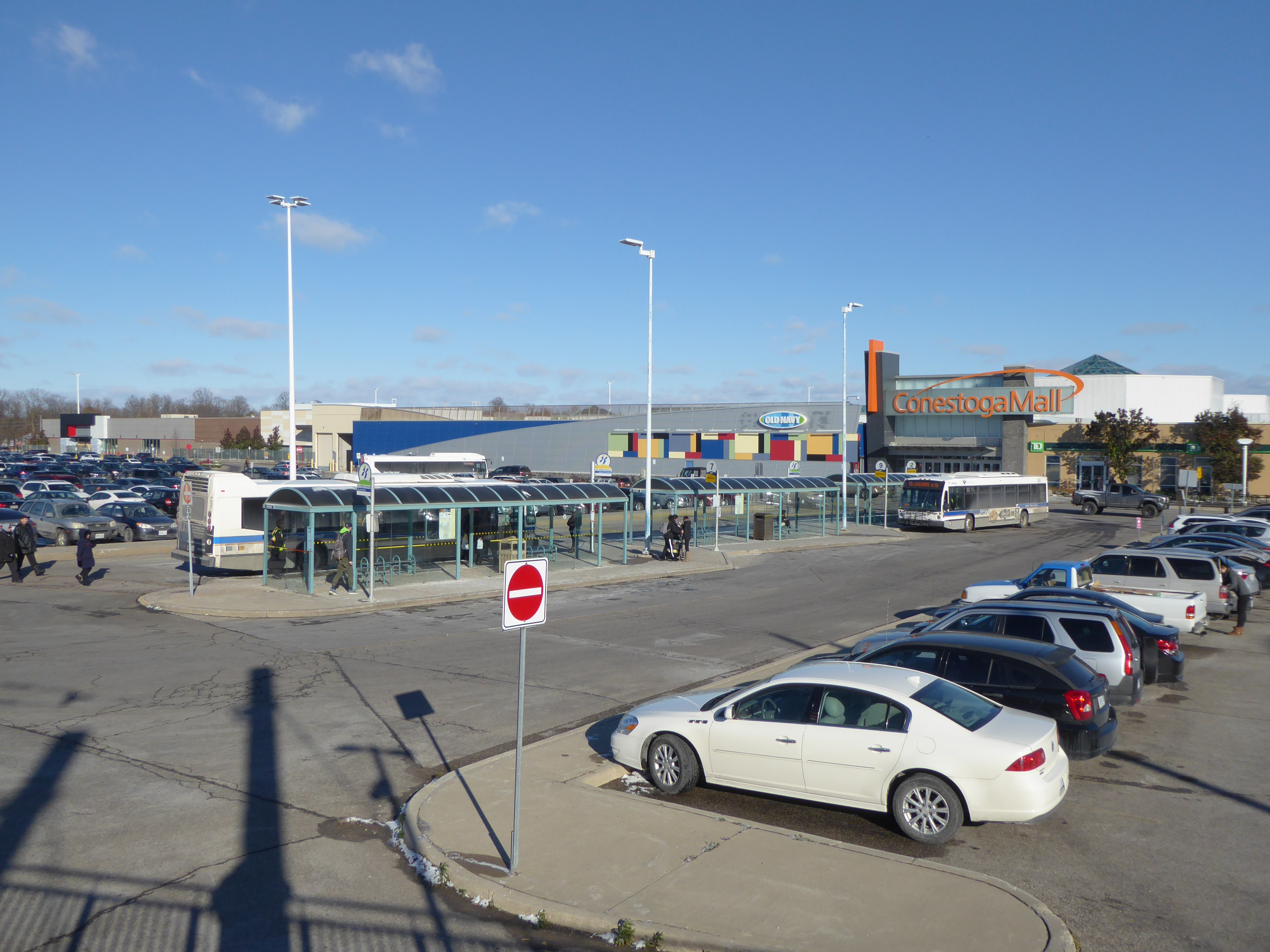
Bus platforms at Conestoga station

=== Grand River Transit ===
- iXpress 201 Fischer–Hallman
- iXpress 202 University
- Route 6 Bridge–Courtland
- Route 7 King
- Route 9 Lakeshore
- Route 14 Bathurst
- Route 21 Elmira
- Route 29 Keats–University
- Route 31 Columbia

=== Perth County Connect ===
- Route 1 Listowel
- Route 2 St. Mary's
