= Fairway station =

Light rail station and bus terminal in Kitchener, Ontario

Fairway
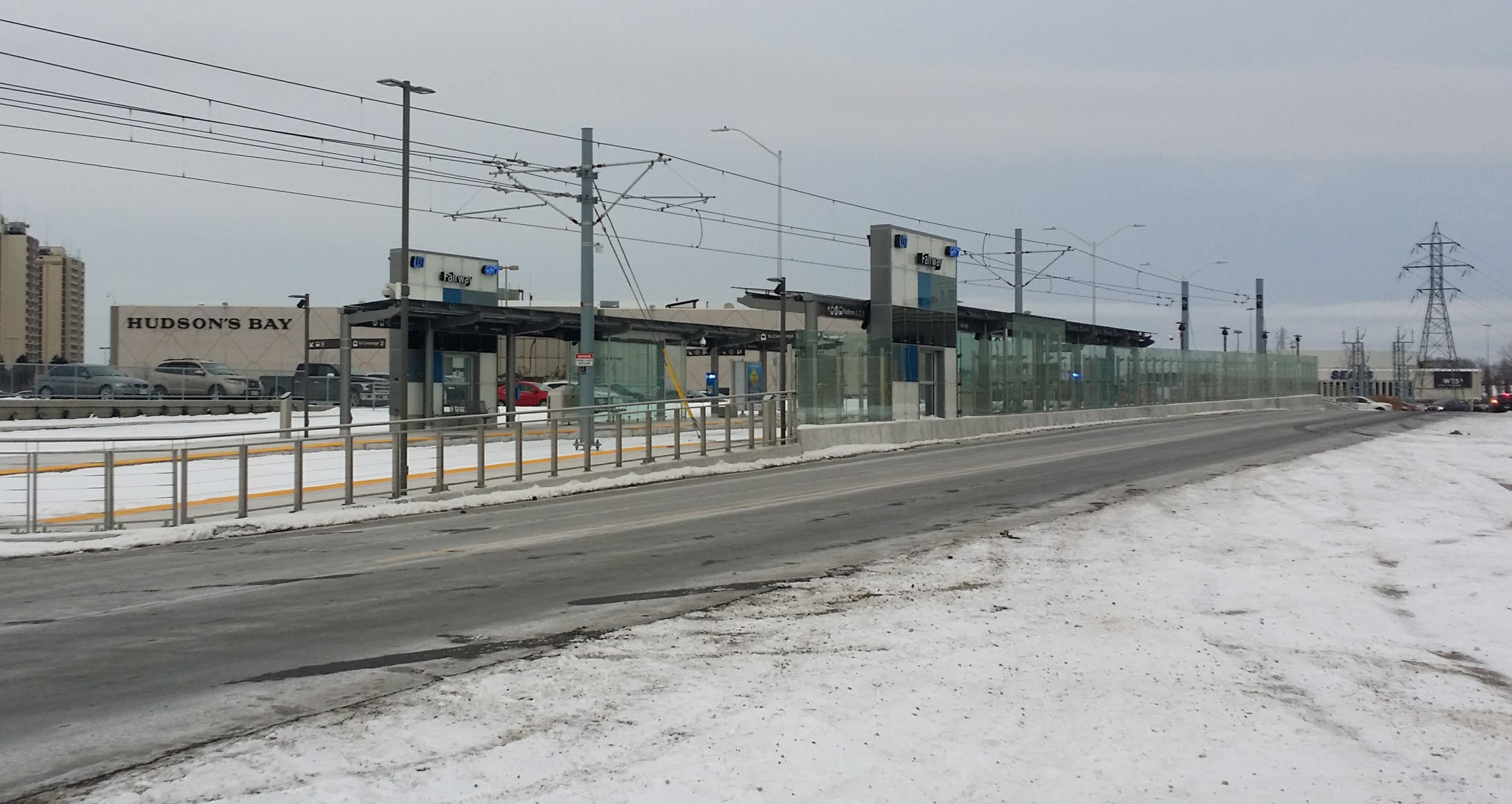
- Station structurally complete, December 2017. The park-and-ride and the new bus terminal are located at the space to the right

General information
- Location: Kitchener, Ontario; Canada
- Coordinates: 43.42236°N 80.44194°W
- Platforms: 2 light rail side platforms 3 bus platforms
- Tracks: 2
- Bus routes: 12
- Bus stands: 9
- Bus operators: Grand River Transit
- Connections: 302 ION Bus; 206 iXpress Coronation; 1 Queen-River; 6 Bridge-Courtland; 7 King; 8 Weber; 10 Pioneer; 12 Westmount; 23 Idlewood; 27 Chicopee; 28 Franklin North; 901 Flex Trinity-Freeport

Construction
- Structure type: At-grade
- Parking: Park and ride
- Accessible: Yes

History
- Opened: June 21, 2019
- Former names: Fairview Park Mall Transit Terminal

Services
Preceding station	Grand River Transit	Following station
Block Line toward Conestoga	Ion	Terminus
Location

Fairway is a light rail station and bus station in Kitchener, Ontario, Canada. It is a stop on the Region of Waterloo's Ion rapid transit system. The station is located just off Wilson Avenue between Fairway Road and Kingsway Drive, adjacent to the Fairview Park Mall. Fairway is the southern terminus of the Ion light rail line, with adapted bus rapid transit (the 302 Ion Bus) continuing on toward Cambridge. The station opened on June 21, 2019. At the same time as the light rail launch, the existing bus terminal was moved from its current location adjacent to the Hudson's Bay store, to a new park and ride lot at the corner of Fairway and Wilson, off of the mall property.

The two LRT platforms are also paired with a bus platform, on the far side of the north platform; this is for Ion-branded buses to Cambridge to interchange swiftly with LRT. These platforms have access from the west, toward the new bus terminal, and from the east, toward the mall.

== Layout ==
Fairway station is located at the northeast corner of Wilson Avenue and Fairway Road, just to the south of Kingsway Drive. It is a combined light rail and bus station, similar to a number of other Ion stations. The station has five platforms in total, which are numbered 1 through 5. Light rail tracks approach the station from the west, crossing Wilson Avenue before terminating at the station itself. The tracks are flanked by two side platforms, which are numbered as platforms 1 and 2. Platform 3, which serves buses, is located directly adjacent and parallel to Platform 2 (the northbound light rail platform), while platforms 4 and 5, which are also used for buses, are at the south end of the station, across a roadway and perpendicular to the light rail platforms. Platform 4 is to the west and Platform 5 is to the east. A small facility to serve transit drivers is located adjacent to the north end of Platform 4. The southwest part of the station area is taken up by its park and ride lot.

== History ==
Fairway station's direct predecessor was the Fairview Park Mall Bus Terminal, which was located to the southeast of the mall's Hudson's Bay location. In 2016, Cadillac Fairview, the owner of Fairview Park Mall, refused the Region of Waterloo's offer to replace the existing bus terminal on their property, which forced the Region to seek a new location. Two restaurant locations near the planned light rail station, a Crabby Joe's and a Burger King, were expropriated and demolished for the new bus station, park and ride, and driver facility. The original bus terminal became defunct on 24 June 2019 when Grand River Transit shifted its bus operations to the new bus station, which, along with the light rail station, became collectively referred to as Fairway station.

After the light rail launch and full service changeover, Fairway station's design was criticized by accessibility advocates, who noted the poor pedestrian access to the mall, as well as the weak pedestrian connections between the light rail and bus stations, which are separated by an active roadway. In September 2019, the Region of Waterloo announced that the station would be modified to improve passenger accessibility and pedestrian traffic flow by removing a panel on the southbound light rail platform's feature wall and creating a second crosswalk to better connect the light rail and bus platforms of the station. The station modifications were completed in October 2019.

The onset of the COVID-19 pandemic led to changes to bus service at the station, such as the suspension of the 110 College Express bus route, which was a direct shuttle bus service between Fairway station and Conestoga College's Doon Campus. Doon Campus had been the southern terminus for the 10 Pioneer and 110 College Express bus routes since before the launch of light rail service. Conestoga College student ridership on Grand River Transit had risen steadily for several years, but with most in-person classes at the college suspended, Grand River Transit removed the 110 College Express from its 2021 schedule.

== Artwork ==
The station features the artwork Shaping Residency by Stephen Cruise with large sculptures of two finches, reminiscent of 19th century Fraktur folk art. The Fairway Transit Driver's Facility features the artwork Arras by Lauren Judge and Elana Chand representing the interweaving of ethnicities, genders, generations and commerce.

The station's feature wall consists of glass tiles in a pattern of white, black, blue, and gray.

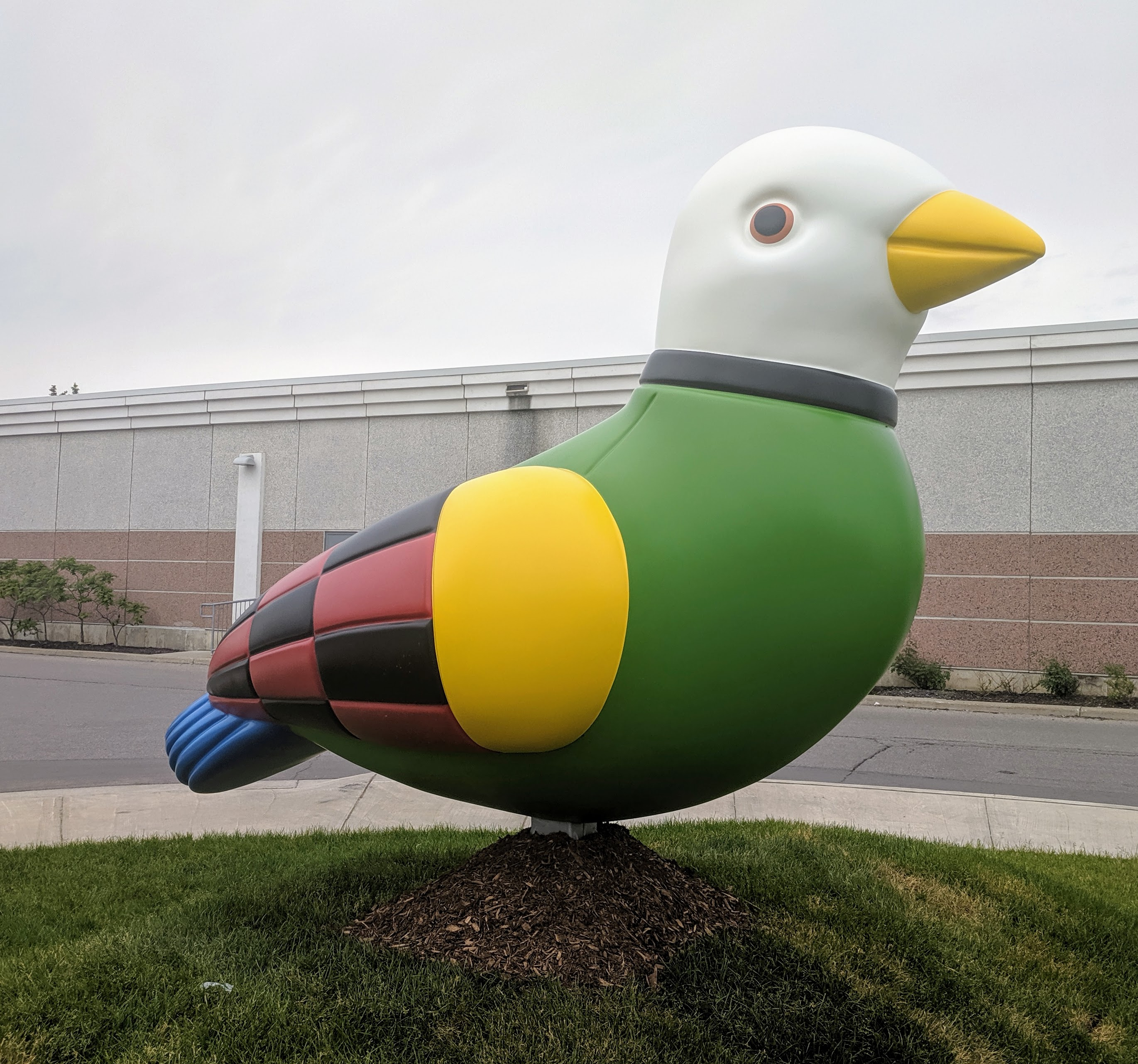
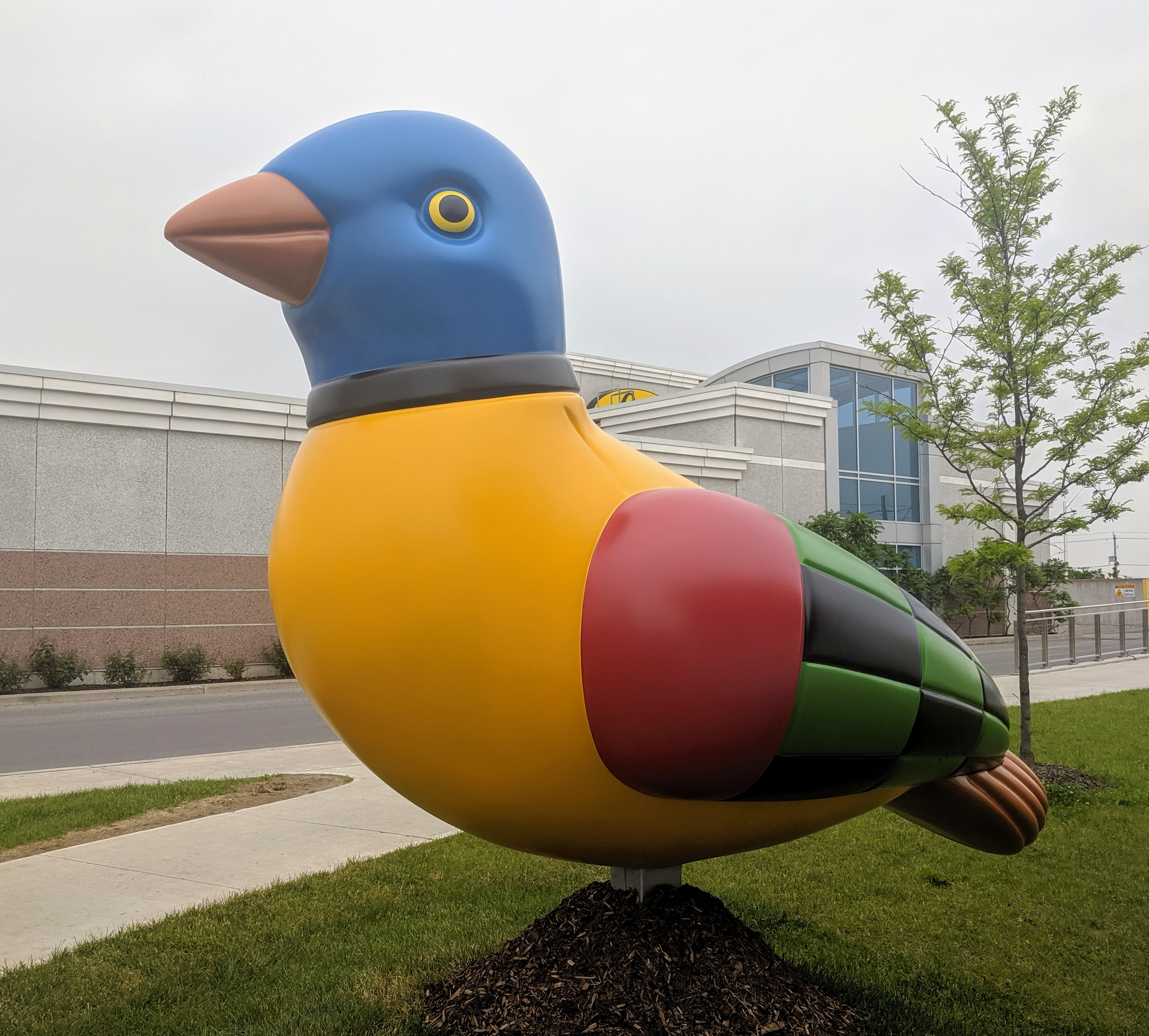
Shaping Residency by Stephen Cruise.
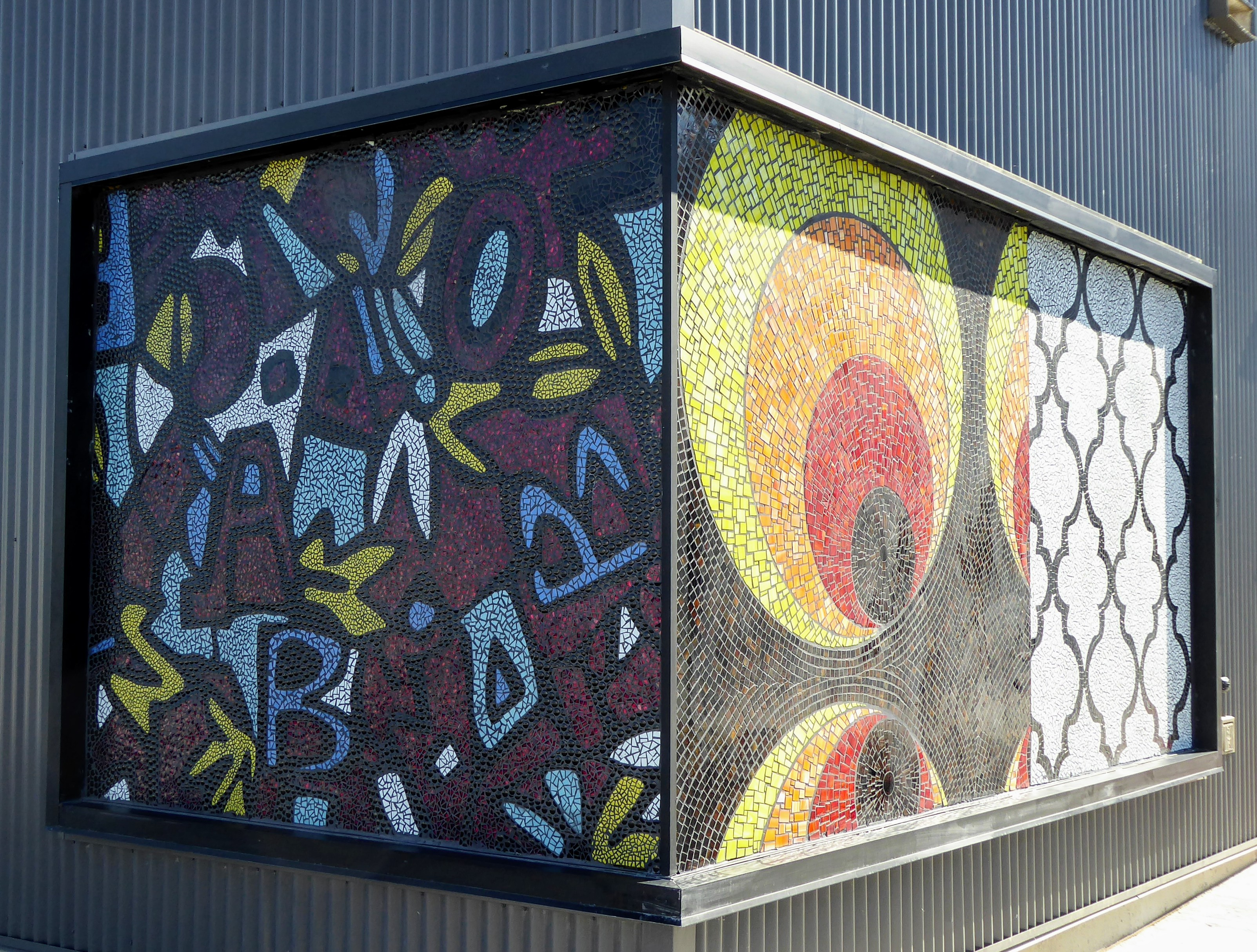
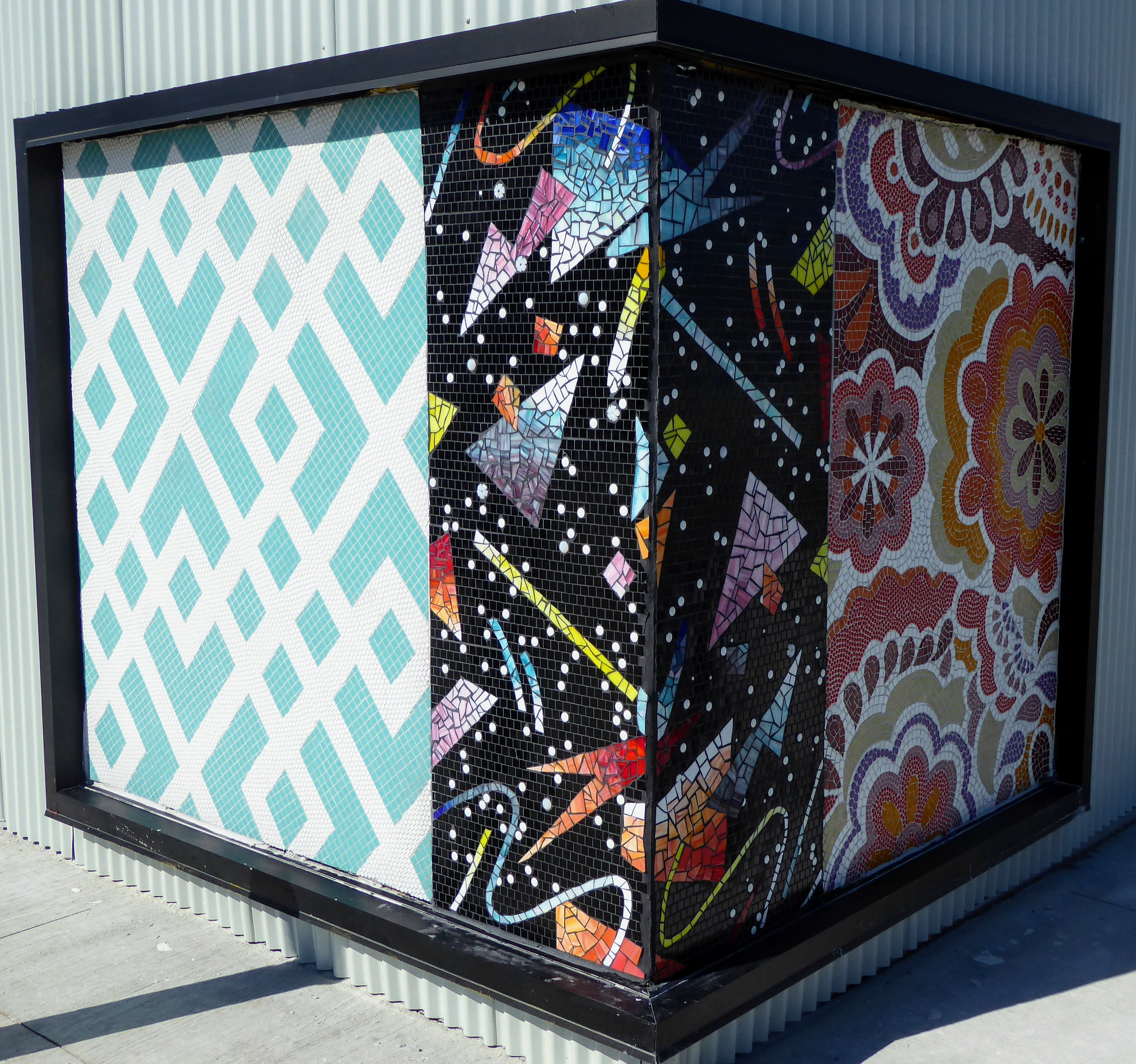
Arras by Lauren Judge and Elana Chand.

== Services ==
All services at the station are operated as part of the regional Grand River Transit system. As of 2021, intercity transit services are not available at the station. The nearest intercity bus station is Sportsworld station to the southeast, which is served by the 25 Waterloo–Mississauga GO bus. The nearest intercity passenger rail services are at Kitchener station in downtown Kitchener to the north.

Routes serving the station as of 2021, by service type:
Type	Routes
rapid transit	301 302
iXpress	206
Local routes	1 6 7 8 10 12 23 27 28
Flex	901

=== Light rail ===
Platforms 1 and 2 at Fairway station are used for light rail service. Waterloo Region's only light rail route, the 301 Ion, has the station as its southern terminus.

=== Bus ===
Platforms 3, 4, and 5 at Fairway station are used for bus service. The station is a hub for local bus routes in south Kitchener, which serve nearby neighbourhoods such as Kingsdale, Centreville, Chicopee, Idlewood, and Traynor–Vanier, as well as the Parkway and Trillium Industrial Park industrial areas. Route 10 Pioneer travels from Fairway through the neighbourhood of Pioneer Park and the community of Doon in the extreme south of Kitchener before terminating at Conestoga College's Doon Campus near Highway 401.

Direct service to the city of Cambridge is available on the 301 Ion Bus and the 206 Coronation iXpress. The 301 Ion Bus is a limited-stop express service which uses Highway 8, stopping at Sportsworld station on the way, then briefly uses Highway 401 before stopping at Pinebush station, travelling south on Hespeler Road, stopping at the Cambridge Centre Transit Terminal, and finally terminating at the Ainslie St. Transit Terminal in the core of Galt. The 206 Coronation iXpress stops more frequently and uses King Street and Coronation Boulevard. It stops at Sportsworld station as well, but takes a southerly route through Preston, stopping at the Cambridge Memorial Hospital, before passing through the core of Galt (where it stops at the Ainslie St. Transit Terminal), then crossing the Grand River to terminate at Southwood Secondary School in west Galt.

The 901 Flex Trinity–Freeport is a flexible transit route. Grand River Transit's flexible transit routes are intended to serve areas which are normally difficult to serve with conventional transit routes, such as areas with poor street and sidewalk networks, low density, and physical barriers, as well as the presence of transit-dependent facilities such as senior or medical care facilities, apartment buildings, or large workplaces. The 901 Flex Trinity–Freeport is a hybrid of on-demand and fixed-route service models. Along with Fairway station, the two other fixed stops are Trinity Village (a retirement complex) and the Grand River Hospital's Freeport Campus.

Information about bus routes serving the station as of March 2021:
No.	Name	Platform	Connections / Destinations	Frequency (minutes)	Notes
302	Bus	3	Sportsworld; Pinebush; Cambridge Centre; Ainslie Terminal	10 peak; 15-30 off-peak	Wi-Fi and charging ports are available.
206	Coronation iXpress	5	Sportsworld; Cambridge Memorial Hospital; Delta; Ainslie Terminal; Southwood Secondary School	15 peak; 30 off-peak	
1	Queen–River	5	Frederick; The Boardwalk	15 peak; 30 off-peak	
6	Bridge–Courtland	4	Block Line; Queen; Victoria Park; Conestoga	30	
7	King	3	Kitchener Farmer's Market; Frederick; Kitchener Central; Grand River Hospital; Allen; Waterloo Public Square; Conestoga	15*	
8	Weber	5	Eastwood Collegiate Institute; Frederick; Kitchener City Hall; Kitchener Central; University / King	15 peak; 30 off-peak	Continues as the 12 Westmount after University / King.
10	Pioneer	3	Pioneer Park Plaza; Conestoga College Doon Campus	15 daytime weekdays; 30 evenings and weekends	Splits between 10 and 10A .
12	Westmount	4	University of Waterloo; Wilfrid Laurier University	15 peak; 30 off-peak	Continues as the 8 Weber after University / King.
23	Idlewood	3	Stanley Park Mall	30 weekdays and Saturdays	Serves the Idlewood neighbourhood.
27	Chicopee	3	Centreville Chicopee Community Centre; Grand River Hospital Freeport Campus	30	
28	Franklin North	4	Stanley Park Mall	30	
901	Trinity–Freeport	4	Trinity Village; Grand River Hospital Freeport Campus	45 weekdays	Route includes flex stops.
