= King Street, Waterloo Region =

Road in the Waterloo Region, Ontario, Canada

King Street
- Waterloo Regional Road 8 Waterloo Regional Road 15
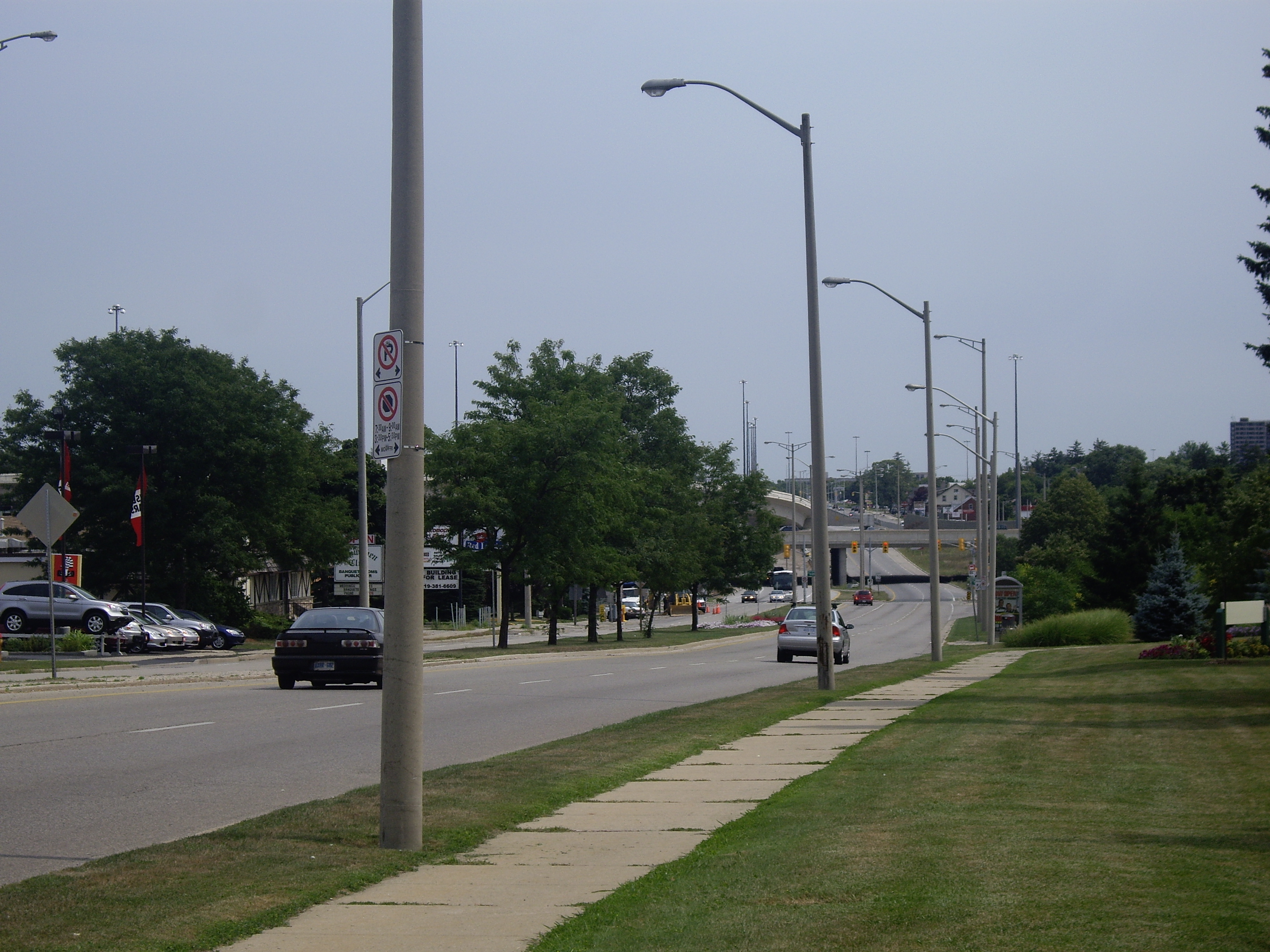
- King Street north of the intersection with Highway 8, looking south in Kitchener.
- Maintained by: Regional Municipality of Waterloo
- Location: Cambridge; Kitchener; Waterloo; Woolwich
- South end: Concession Road in Cambridge (continues as Coronation Boulevard)
- Major junctions: Regional Road 41 (Bishop Street N); Regional Road 17 (Fountain Street N); Highway 401; Regional Road 38 (Maple Grove Road); Highway 8 (Freeport Diversion); Regional Road 53 (Fairway Road N); Highway 7 / Highway 8 (Conestoga Parkway); Regional Road 4 (Ottawa Street); Regional Road 55 (Victoria Street); Regional Road 9 (Erb Street / Bridgeport Road); Regional Road 57 (University Avenue); Regional Road 59 (Columbia Street); Regional Road 8 (Weber Street); Highway 85 (Conestoga Parkway); Regional Road 22 (Northfield Drive); Regional Road 52 (Bridge Street W); Regional Road 15 (Lobsinger Line); Regional Road 17 (Sawmill Road)
- East end: Three Bridges Road in Woolwich

King Street, or Waterloo Regional Road 15, is the major northwest–southeast arterial road in Kitchener, Ontario, as well as Waterloo, Ontario, where it runs north–south. In Waterloo, King Street divides the city into east and west sides, and in Kitchener, it divides the city into north and south sides. At the Conestoga Parkway, in southern Kitchener, King Street becomes the Highway 8 Expressway. King Street "resumes" about four kilometres to the east, where Weber Street is renamed to King Street and then continues to Cambridge, Ontario.

== Route description ==
=== Downtown Kitchener ===
In Kitchener, the main segment of King Street starts at the Highway 8 Freeport Diversion, also known as Highway 8 Expressway, bend in an interchange with the Conestoga Parkway. After the Freeport Diversion passes under the Conestoga overpasses, the Highway 8 designation continues on the Conestoga west of the junction on the loop ramp, but going straight ahead defaults to King Street, which continues northwesterly through Downtown Kitchener and eventually to the boundary with Waterloo. East of the interchange, Conestoga Parkway serves as a bypass of King Street.

Although it runs southeast–northwest, King Street is labelled east–west since Kitchener originally developed relative to the Grand River based on the alignment of the Haldimand Tract, which runs north–south. The same is true for the other major north–south routes in the city (such as Weber Street), and the reverse is true for the major east–west arteries in the city (although they run east–west, they are labelled north–south). The intersection of King Street and Queen Street (which was the nucleus of the early community that would become Kitchener) in Downtown Kitchener is the point from which the city's street directions are determined. King Street divides Kitchener's streets into north and south, and Queen Street divides streets into east and west.

King Street is the major street of Downtown Kitchener, with such buildings as the Kitchener City Hall and Market Square. Throughout downtown, the street is also lined with shops, boutiques, and nightclubs. Northwest of downtown, King Street is home to Grand River Hospital. It also contains television studios (for CKCO-TV) and radio stations (CHYM-FM, CIKZ-FM and CKGL, which moved to "The Boardwalk" near Ira Needles Boulevard and University Avenue). CKBT-FM and CJDV-FM studios were relocated to the southern end of Kitchener/Cambridge in the Sportsworld plaza in 2010.

In 2004, when the Highway 8/Conestoga Parkway interchange was realigned to increased traffic capacity, the number of lanes headed towards King Street was reduced from two to one because of the need to accommodate the new flyover ramp from the Conestoga to Highway 8.

=== Kitchener to Cambridge ===
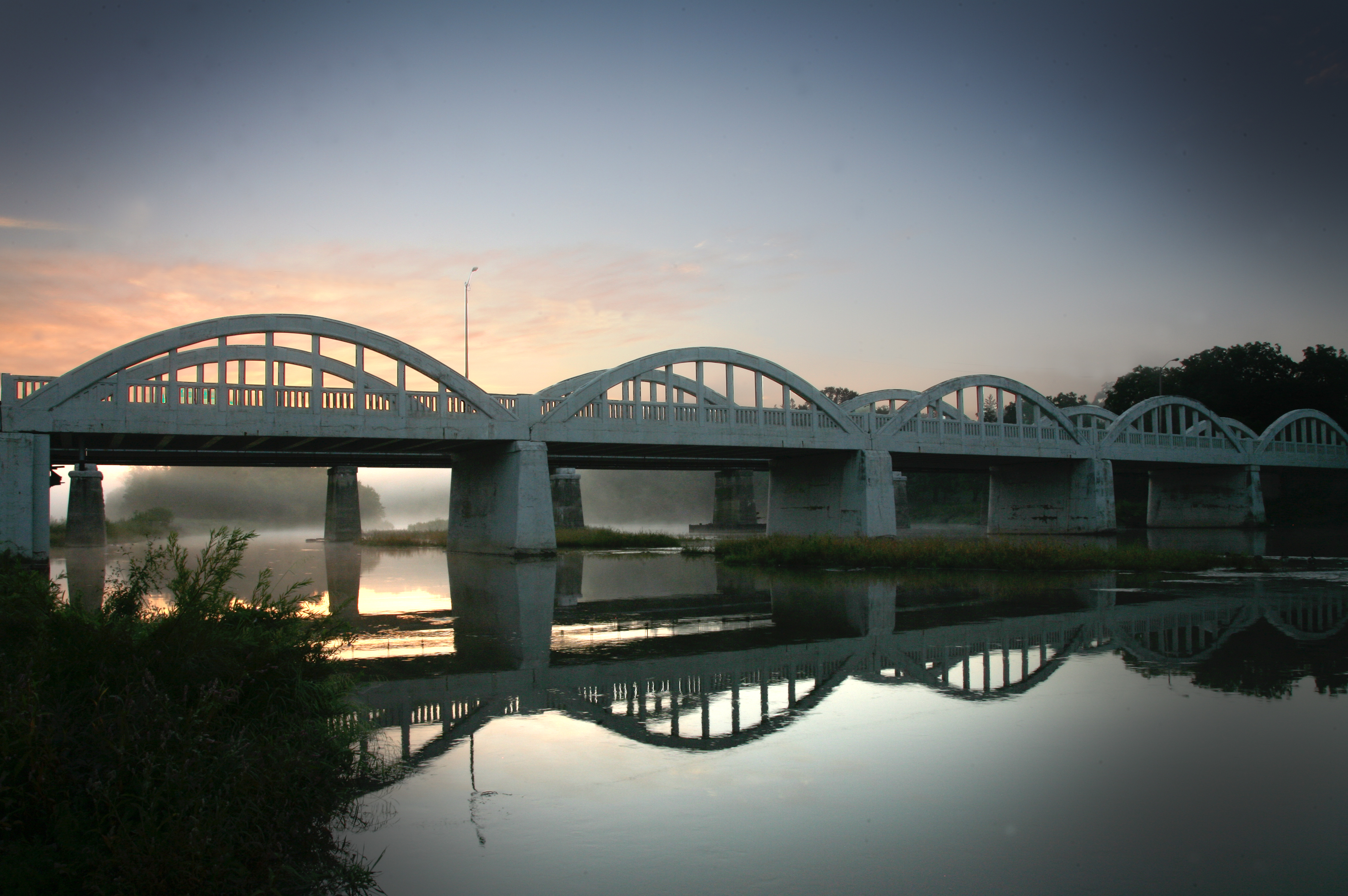
Freeport Bridge, where 'Old' King Street crosses the Grand River. Built in 1925–26, it is registered (#8068) with Canada's Historic Register

Another King Street, in southern Kitchener, runs north–south. It originally began at Wilfred Avenue (a residential street) and ran southward into Cambridge, wedged in between the Freeport Diversion and Weber Street.

That road was initially part of King Street downtown until the portion between Wilfred Avenue and Weber Street became the right-of-way for the Highway 8 Freeport Diversion freeway, with its terminus being redirected towards Weber Street. When the Diversion was completed in the late 1960s, travel between the two segments of King Street required one to use either the freeway's Fairway Road interchange or Weber Street and Montgomery Road.

South of Weber, the street "resumed" again and continued to Cambridge to intersect with the Freeport Diversion a second time at an at-grade Y-intersection, with the Freeport Diversion traffic being given priority. King Street continued on eastward as a divided at-grade expressway carrying the Highway 8 designation, south to Highway 401 and Cambridge. The road is often referred to as Old King Street or King East to distinguish it from the downtown thoroughfare. King East provided a link between Highway 401 and the Freeport Diversion.

In 1987, the at-grade intersection was replaced with a two-ramp interchange, when the freeway extension (secretly designated Highway 7187) of the Freeport Diversion was constructed to provide a direct freeway link to Highway 401 eastbound to Toronto. Highway 401 eastbound traffic, however, continued to use King Street East to reach the Freeport Diversion.

In 2001, the Highway 401 exit signage at King Street East was changed from Highway 8 to Shantz Hill Road since that section of Highway 8 had been downloaded from the province to municipal authorities in 1998. The Highway 8 designation was later given to the Freeport Diversion extension to reconnect it with Highway 401.

=== Waterloo ===
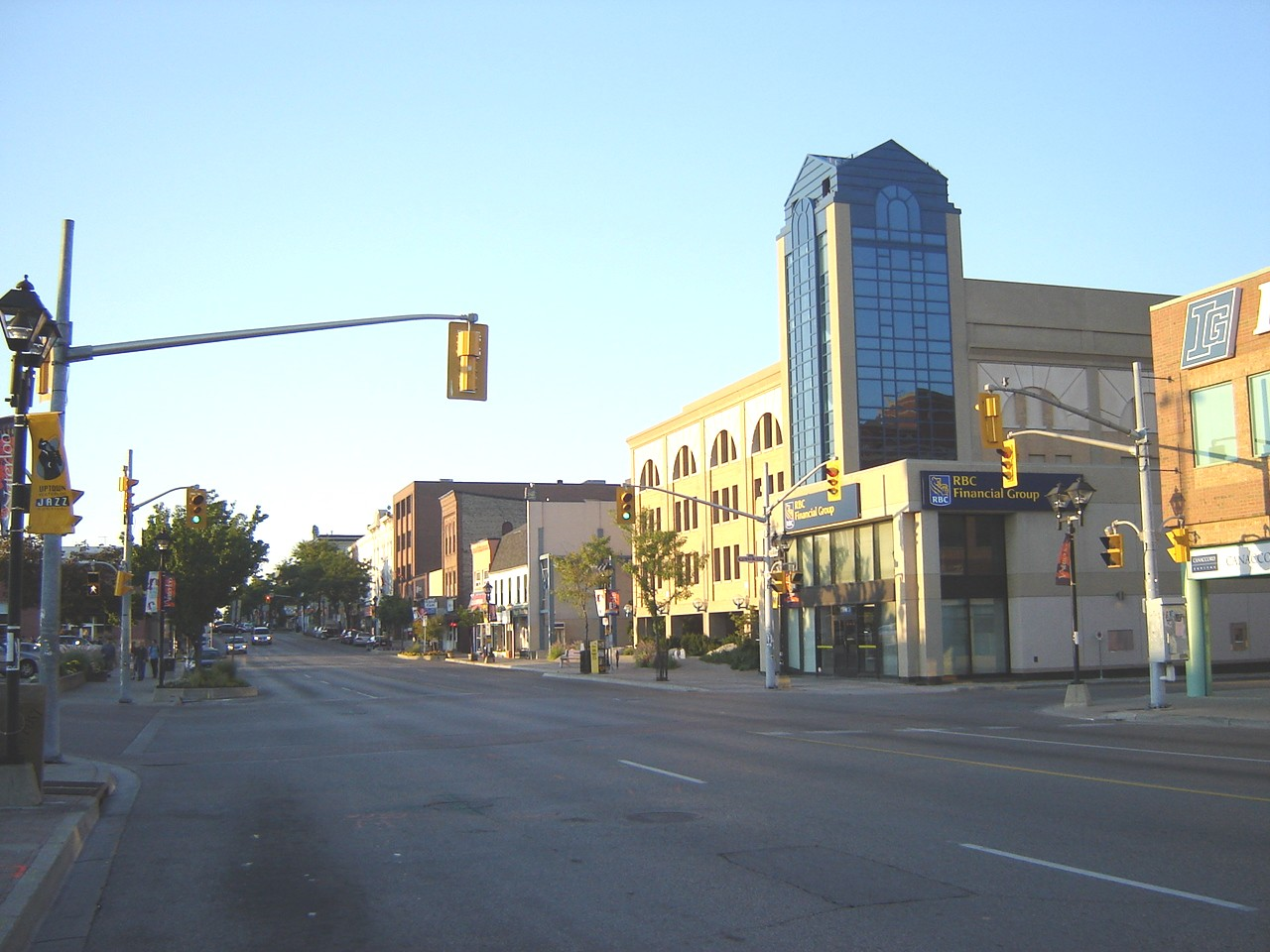
King Street South is the heart of Uptown Waterloo.

Upon crossing into Waterloo, King Street turns northeastward and continues until it exits the city into Woolwich Township. As in Kitchener, King Street crosses Weber Street in Waterloo (it intersects a third time at the north end of Weber Street) and also has an interchange with the Conestoga Parkway, which is now designated as Highway 85.

A major difference between King Street in Kitchener and in Waterloo, however, is that the street, upon entering Waterloo, is labelled north–south (the dividing line being Erb Street) instead of east–west as in Kitchener, like for all other major north–south thoroughfares in Waterloo.

King Street is the main thoroughfare in Downtown Kitchener but also Uptown Waterloo (the central district of Waterloo). Shops and pubs line the street roughly from the border with Kitchener until Bridgeport Road. Also, two major shopping malls are situated on King Street: Waterloo Town Square in Uptown Waterloo and Conestoga Mall at the junction with Highway 85 (both are currently in the midst of major redevelopment projects).

=== Woolwich and Wellesley ===
North of Waterloo, King Street intersects Weber Street once again, at Weber Street's northern terminus at St. Jacobs Farmers' Market.

Waterloo Regional Road 15 also continues west at the T-intersection of King Street N and Lobsinger Line that is locally known as Wagner's Corners. "Lobsinger Line" is named after a local community figure in the village of St. Clements, Ontario.

Lobsinger Line is the main road for the communities of Heidelberg, Ontario, and St. Clements, Ontario, as well as the Old Order Mennonites. Along Lobsinger Line, it is common to see signs for produce, eggs, firewood, and "No Sunday Sales" from each of the laneways.

Lobsinger Line ends at the T-intersection of Lobsinger and Waterloo Regional Road 5, in the hamlet of Crosshill, Ontario.

== History ==
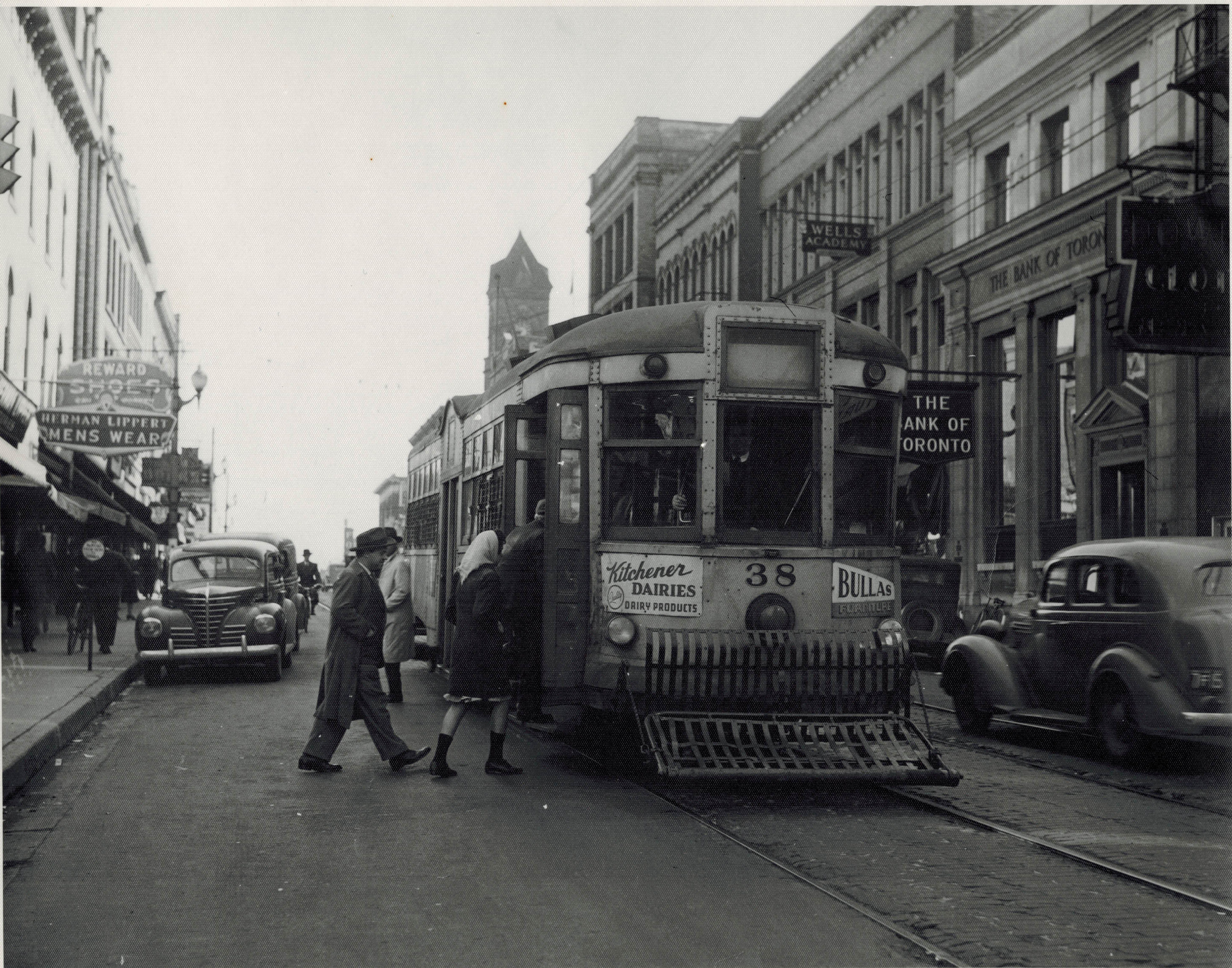
By the 1940s, private automobiles had become more common, and occupied more space on the street alongside streetcars, bicycles and pedestrians.

The route of King Street through Kitchener, along with the "old" King Street near Centreville (some of which is now the route of the Freeport Diversion), was used in the late 19th and early 20th centuries for interurban and street railway systems in street running operations. One of these was the Preston and Berlin Street Railway (P&B), which originally ran from Preston (now a part of Cambridge) along the earlier routing of King Street until it reached Albert Street (later renamed Madison Avenue) in what was then the south end of Kitchener. From there, the P&B tracks connected to the tracks of the Berlin and Waterloo Street Railway, which passed through the core of downtown Kitchener on their way to Waterloo. The Preston and Berlin Street Railway was later amalgamated into the Grand River Railway. Its street operation franchise for Kitchener expired in October 1919, leading to a municipal takeover of about 4,700 feet (1,400 m) of track by the Kitchener Public Utilities Commission from Albert Street to what was then the southern city limit. The Grand River Railway then bypassed King Street beyond Stirling Avenue following a new dedicated right of way, though the tracks south of Stirling continued to run alongside the roadway. The section of track running parallel to King Street between Centreville and Ottawa Street in Kitchener was abandoned in the early 1960s after a 1960 agreement between the railway and the city of Kitchener. This allowed for the later conversion of parts of King Street to a boulevard, as well as the construction of the Freeport Diversion.

== See also ==
- List of numbered roads in Waterloo Region
- Royal eponyms in Canada
