= Kitchener Farmer's Market =

Farmer's market

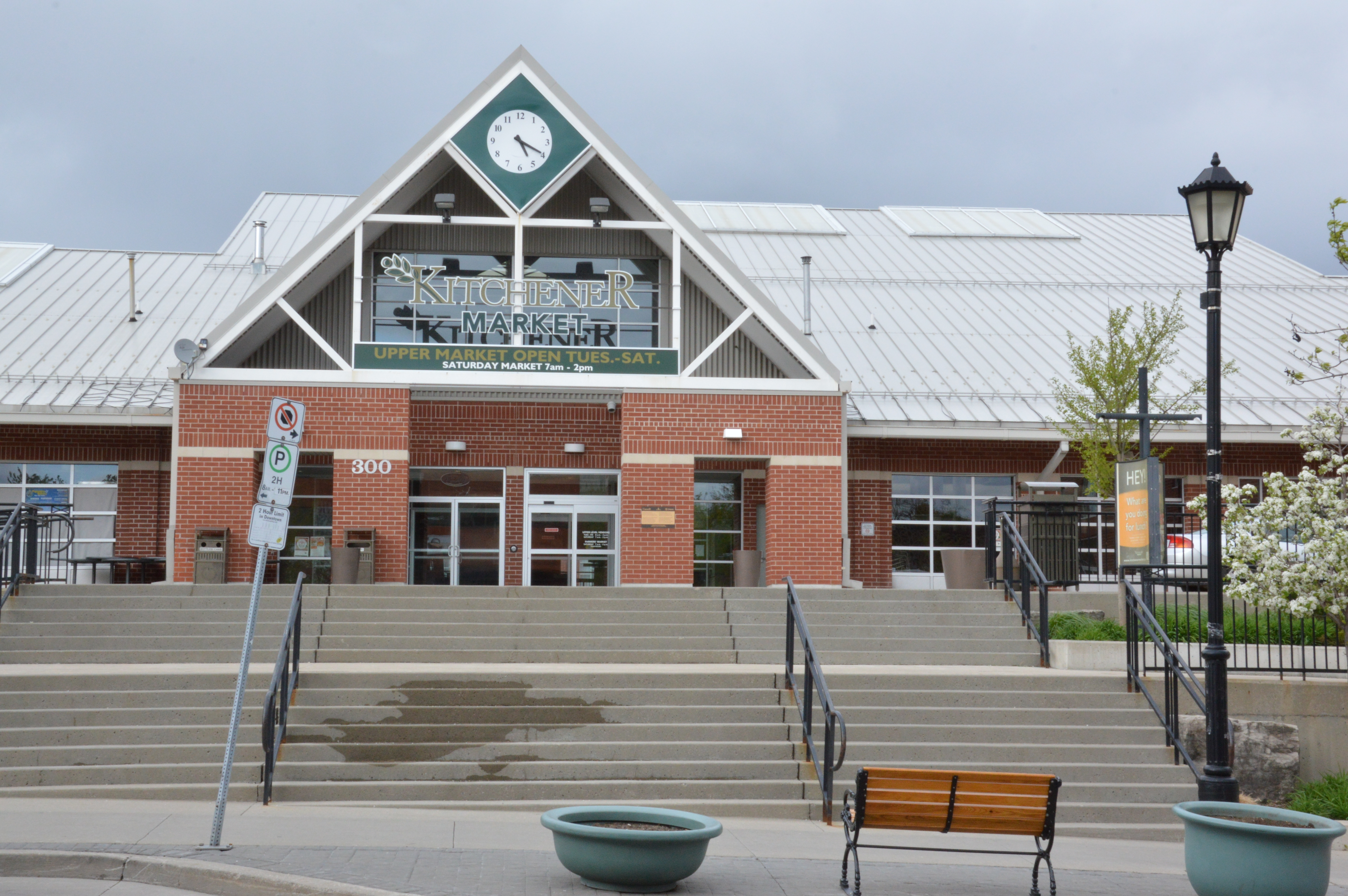
- Entrance
- Founded: 1869
- Location: Kitchener, Ontario
- Coordinates: 43.45°N 80.483°W
- Owner: City of Kitchener

The Kitchener Farmer's Market is one of the oldest continuous local farmer's markets in Canada. The market is located in Kitchener, Ontario, and reflects the continued relationship of Kitchener with the Mennonite community (especially with vendors selling meats and baked goods) and farmers that continues to exist in the area.

The market is open weekly on Saturdays year-round and has more than 80 farmer/vendors. Different stalls sell a variety of wares, including fresh produce, raw and cured meats, cheese, eggs, fish, honey, prepared foods, breads and pastries, as well as specialty items like chocolate, Middle Eastern foods and kombucha. Non-food products like flowers, skin products and handcrafted gifts are also available, and artisan vendors change from week to week.

== History ==
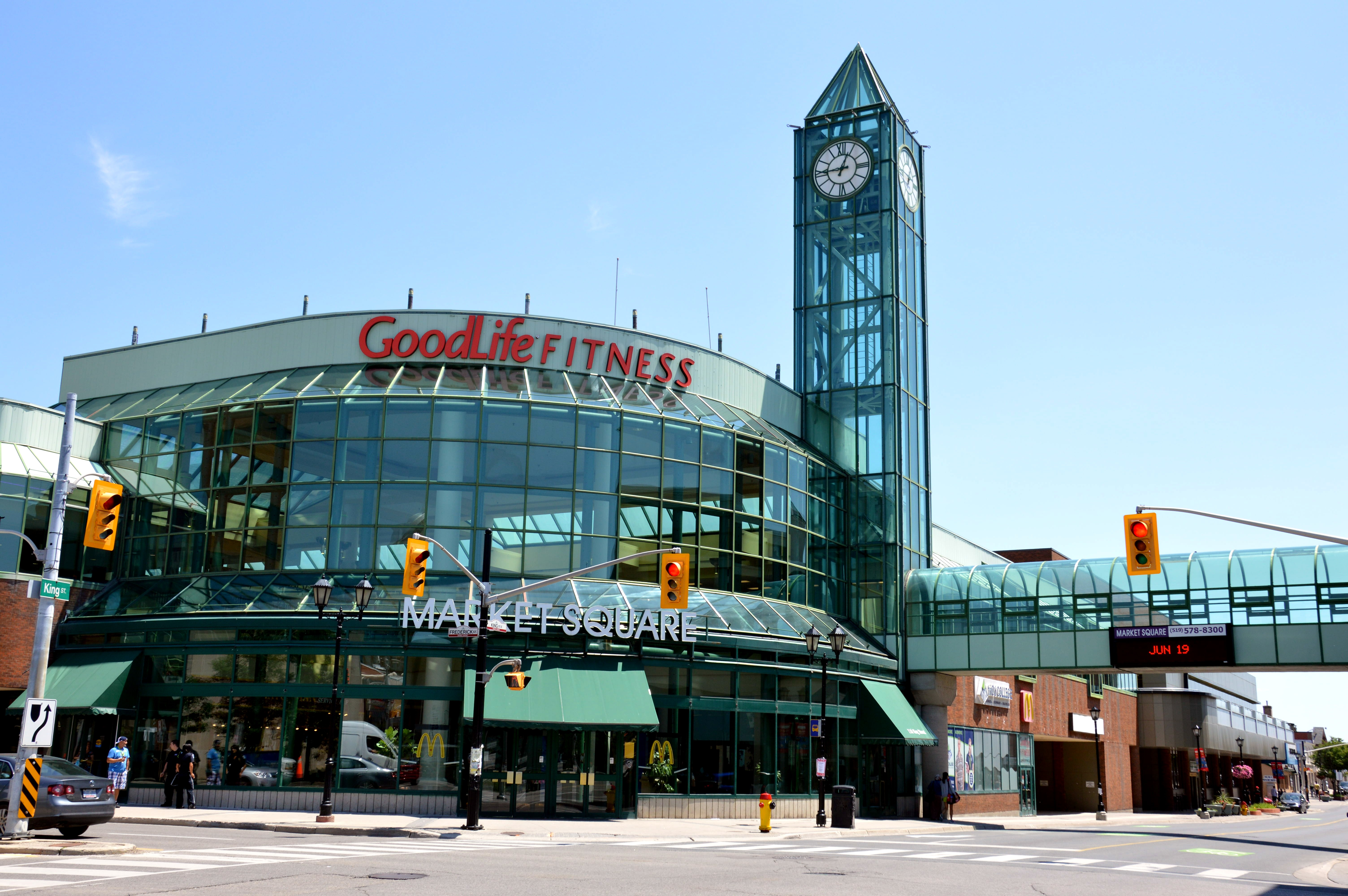
Site of original market and home of the market from 1973 to 2004

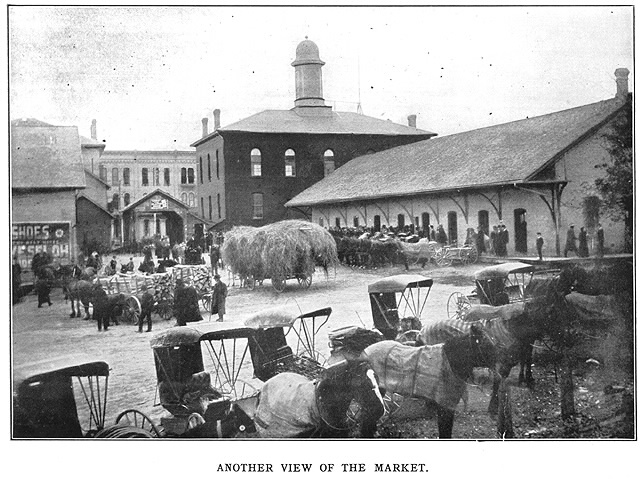
View of 1872 market (building on the right) in 1906 a year before it was rebuilt

The market traces its roots to 1839 as a local market selling farm goods from around the region. It was founded by entrepreneur and civic leader Jacob Y. Shantz (1822-1909), who was responsible for the market's first permanent and formal installation in 1869.

The market remained in the same location (Frederick, King, Scott, and Duke Streets) but with three different buildings:

- 1869 -- Farmer's Market is contained within the Berlin Town Hall along Duke Street.
- 1872 -- Farmer's Market is built as a long, low-slung building behind the Berlin Town Hall.
- 1907 -- Farmer's Market is rebuilt on the same site for the third time as a two-story structure perpendicular to the 1924 Kitchener City Hall, and facing Scott Street.

In 1971, the city decided to tear down the market along with the second City Hall. This resulted in the market being relocated (in 1973) within what is now Market Square Shopping Centre.

In 2004, the Farmer's Market relocated again to a larger site at 300 King Street East, between Cedar and Eby Streets. Free parking is available in the basement of the building and a traffic officer is usually on duty to direct Saturday traffic in and out of the Cedar Street parking garage. During spring, summer and fall, many of the fresh produce vendors sell their wares in the covered parking area off of Eby Street.

In July 2026, a fire broke out in a vendor stall at the market, forcing a months-long closure of the market building. During the restoration, the farmers market transitioned to a fully-outdoor operation model. Remediation by local company Woodhouse Restoration Services is planned to run from October 2026 to spring 2027.

In the 140 years of its existence, the market has been a popular attraction for both locals and visitors.

== Modern use ==
Since the 2004 relocation, the market has added more commercial operations. It is now open from Tuesdays to Saturdays for international food vendors located on the second floor of the building. This area has a bustling food court where shoppers can eat lunch, enjoy coffee or take a rest. Visitors can also avail of a sitting area on the main floor or on the tables located outside the market during the warmer months.

The market is busiest during its year-round Saturday farmers' market which operates from 7 a.m. to 2 p.m. On Saturdays, it is common to see a musician or musical duo playing at each end of the market building. All levels of the market are accessible by wheelchair users and families with strollers due to an elevator which connects the parking garage with the first and second floors of the building.

The upper level of the market is available to rent for birthday parties, weddings, meetings, exhibitions cooking classes and other events, and provides access to a full-sized commercial kitchen and catering as requested.

Due to the COVID-19 pandemic, all regular classes, cooking events and rentals have been cancelled or shifted online. The market has also introduced a seniors-focused shopping hour from 7 a.m. to 8 a.m.

== See also ==
- St. Jacobs Farmers' Market – newer but larger rival market located north of Kitchener
