= St. Jacobs Farmers' Market =

Market in Woolwich, Ontario, Canada

Coordinates: 43.5114°N 80.5541°W

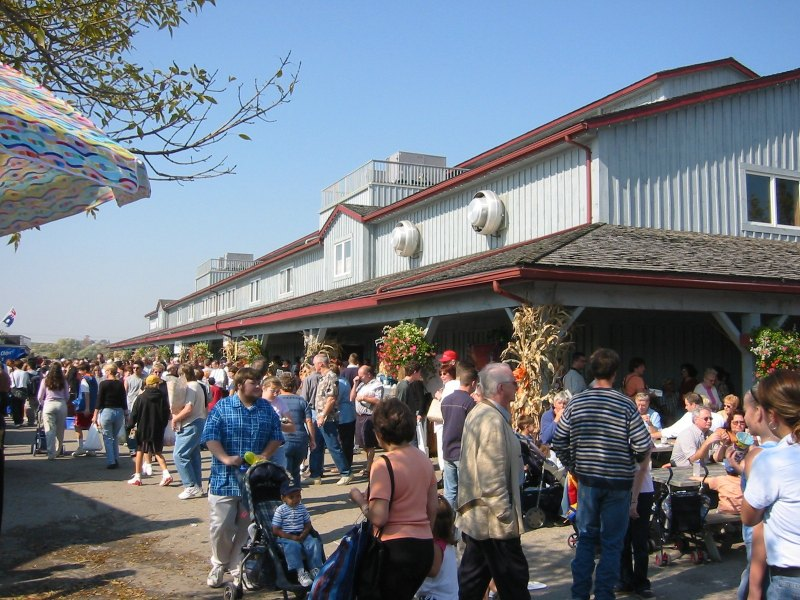
The primary building of the St. Jacobs Farmers' Market as photographed in 2003. It was destroyed by fire in 2013.

St. Jacobs Farmers' Market is a farmers' market and flea market in Woolwich, Ontario, Canada. It is located to the south of King Street North, to the east of Weber Street North, and to the west of the railway tracks. It is the largest year-round farmers' market in Canada, and is a popular destination for residents of the town and nearby communities, as well as tourists from Canada, the United States, and Europe. It draws about 1 million visitors annually.

It was established in April 1975. The main building of the market was destroyed by a fire on 2 September 2013. The market was rebuilt and re-opened on 11 June 2015.

The farmers' market is open on Thursdays and Saturdays throughout the year, as well as Tuesdays between June and August.

== Market ==
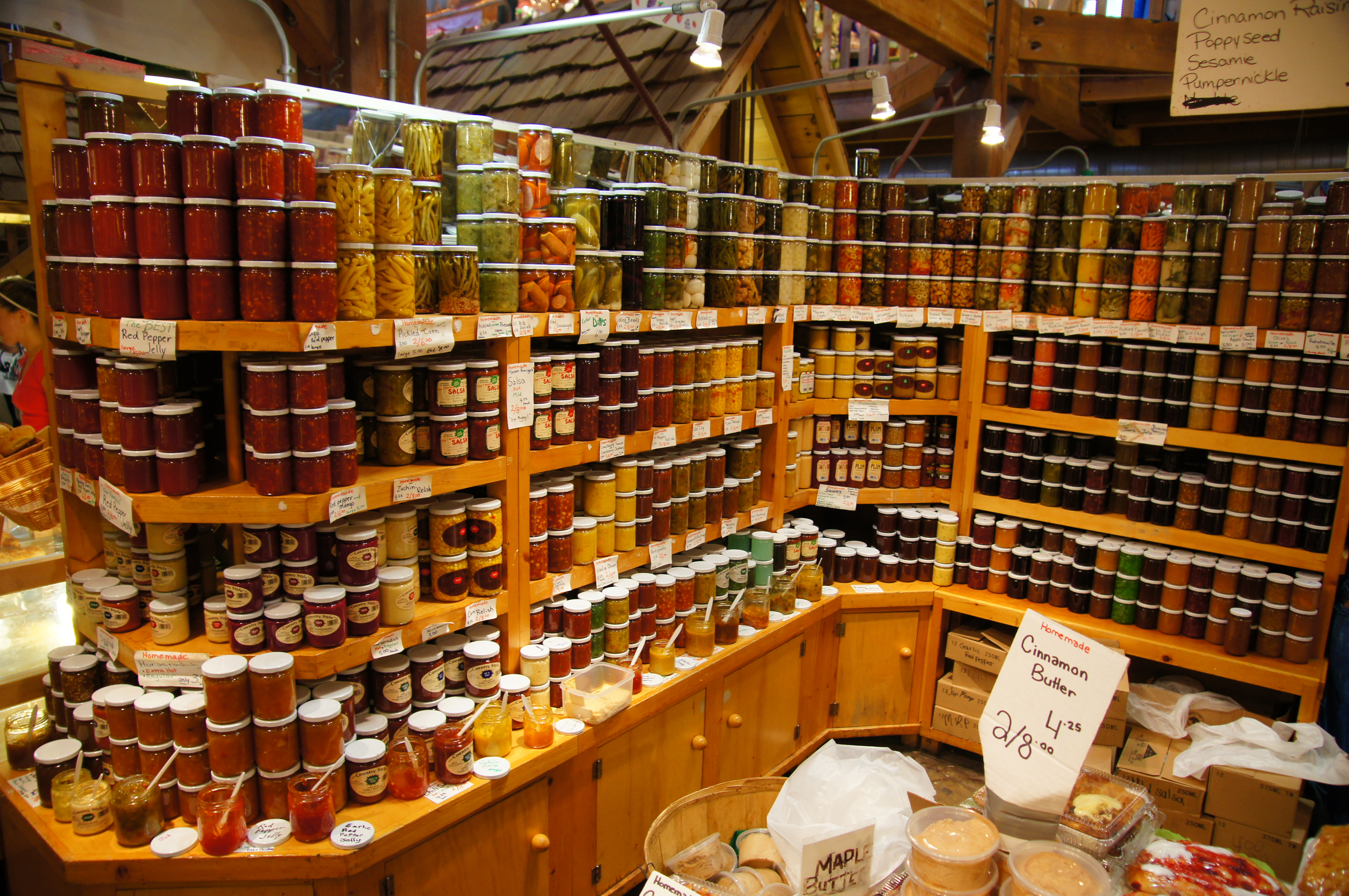
A vendor's stall at the main building of the farmers' market in 2011

The market was established in April 1975 by eight farmers, who merged a three-owner stockyard based in Waterloo with a five-owner stockyard based in Kitchener. The owners included Jim Wideman, Bruce Hertel Jacob Shantz, Ross Shantz, and Milo Shantz; the Shantz families then managed the facility for over forty years. It was originally "just tents outside on the pavement". In 1986, a two-storey 24,000-square-foot (2,200 m^{2}) heavy timber building was constructed on the site, the frame of which used 12"x12" Douglas fir beams from British Columbia.

The market consisted of the Peddler's Village building for the flea market and some food vendors, smaller buildings each housing a single retailer, and an open area in which up to 150 food and produce vendors set up an outdoor shop from spring to autumn. The food and produce vendors operate in one of four classes: a grower, who only sell produce grown on their family farms; a grower/buyer, whose sales include at least 50% produce grown on their family farms, and the remainder the same produce purchased from other farms in Ontario; a co-op grower, who partner with local growers; and annual produce, who sell produce they did not grow, and may not sell produce that is in season in Ontario.

The two-storey food building, owned by Mercedes Corporation since the 1990s, was the central building of the market in which operated 68 vendors before its destruction by fire. On the lower level were food vendors, and on the upper level were located home decoration and crafts vendors.

The site also has a livestock barn and petting barn.

The market was managed by the Shantz family until 2017, when the more than 40 shareholders of Mercedes Corporation agreed to sell the market, St. Jacobs Outlets, Market Road Antiques, and the TSC store on Weber Street to Schlegel Urban Developments, with a closing date in early 2018.

=== Fire ===
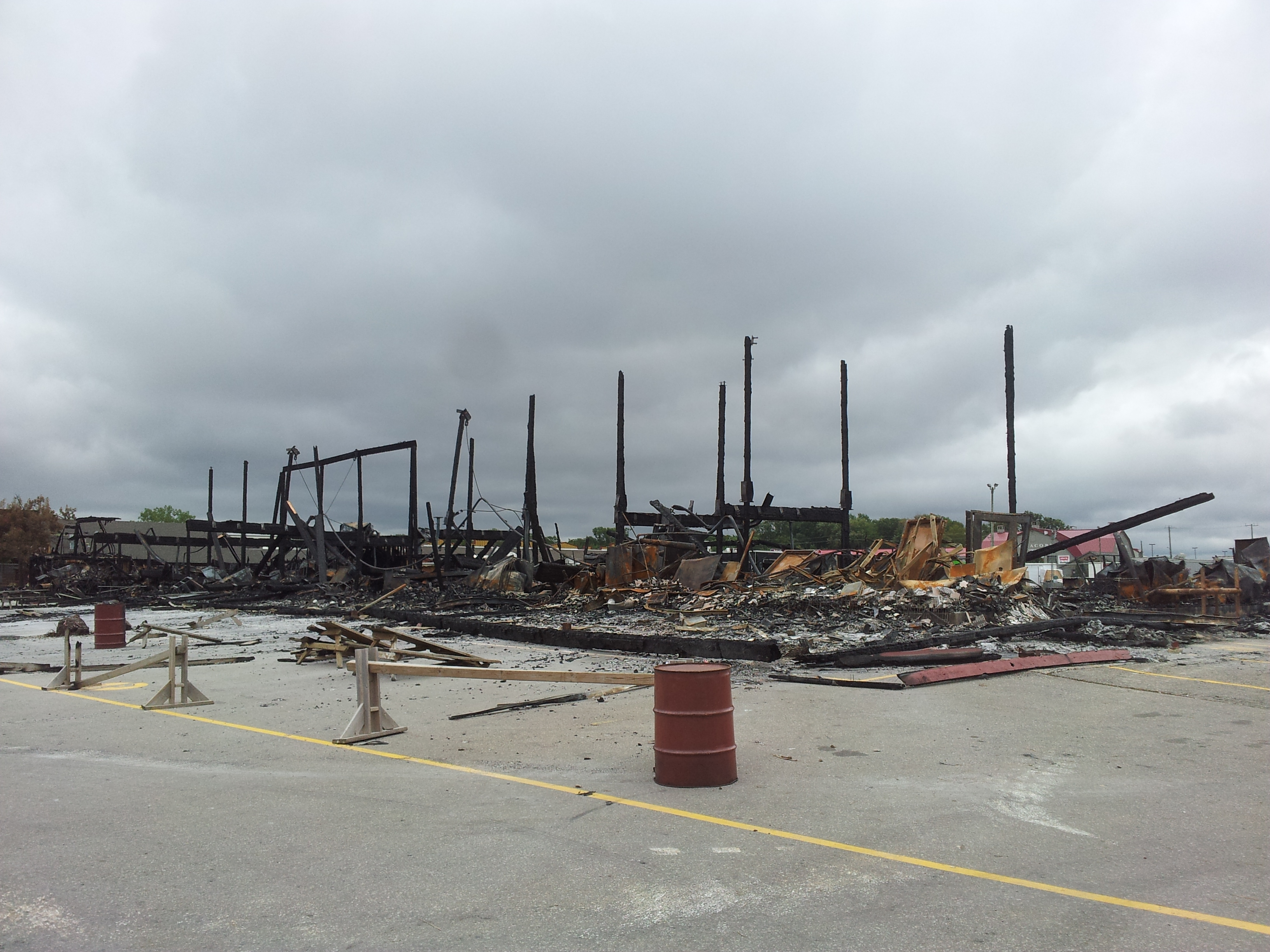
Aftermath of the fire that destroyed the main building

The main building of the St. Jacobs Farmers' Market was destroyed by a fire on the morning of 2 September 2013. Forty-five firefighters from four stations were required to extinguish the fire. The fire did not harm any people, or the livestock in a nearby building. The fire caused about $2 million of damage to the building. A fire alarm system had been installed in the building in early 2013, and a fire sprinkler system had been planned for installation. Woolwich Fire Department Chief Rick Pedersen said a fire sprinkler system could have prevented the building's destruction or minimized damage caused by the fire.

The fire did not affect the other buildings on the site, as the wind "was blowing the flames away from the surrounding buildings on the property".

Todd Cowan, the mayor of the township of Woolwich in which St. Jacobs is located, stated that the township would "fast-track the building site plans and the building permits" to rebuild the main building of the market. He also stated that the fire would have a "huge" economic impact on the community, and some vendors stated they would have to lay off employees as a result.

The Kitchener and Waterloo Community Foundation established the St. Jacobs Farmers’ Market Vendor Relief Fund in order to raise funds "to help affected vendors offset uninsured losses", predicted to be about $750,000. This includes the purchase of replacement capital goods, and assisting laid off employees.

Several of the intact wood beams were salvaged from the site as mementos by Mercedes Corporation "just to remember the building". Some of the salvaged wood was purchased by an artist in Guelph, who used it to create furniture and other goods.

=== Rebuilding ===
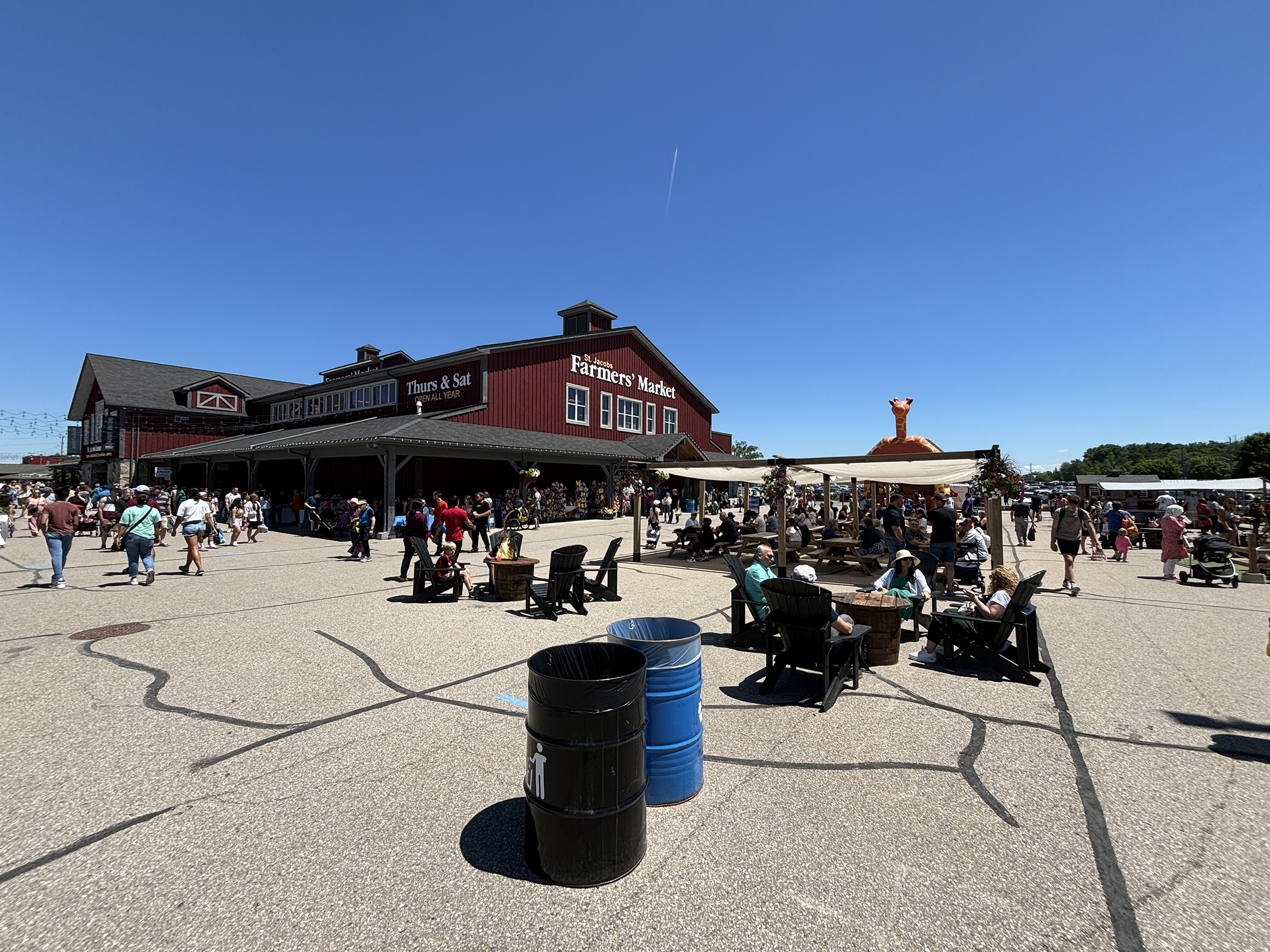
St. Jacobs Farmers' Market new building, completed in 2015

A temporary structure was erected on the site beginning in mid-October 2013. Metal legs were placed along the perimeter of the concrete foundation, an engineered steel roof frame was installed by crane, and a weatherproof textile cover stretched over it. The 15,600 square feet (1,450 m^{2}) dome-shaped structure was built on the same foundation as the original structure and opened on 12 December 2013. Of the 60 vendors from the original building, 49 returned to the temporary structure; displaced food vendors moved into the Peddler's Village.

Construction of a permanent 34,000 square feet (3,200 m^{2}) structure to replace the destroyed building was completed in 2015. Similar to the original main building, the Market Building houses food vendors on the lower level and artisan vendors on the upper level. Shoppers can find a variety of meats, cheeses, baked goods and local delicacies all in one stop. After the opening of the Market Building, it was decided that the temporary tent, erected on the foundation of the original main building would remain and currently houses 50 food, artisan and craft vendors.

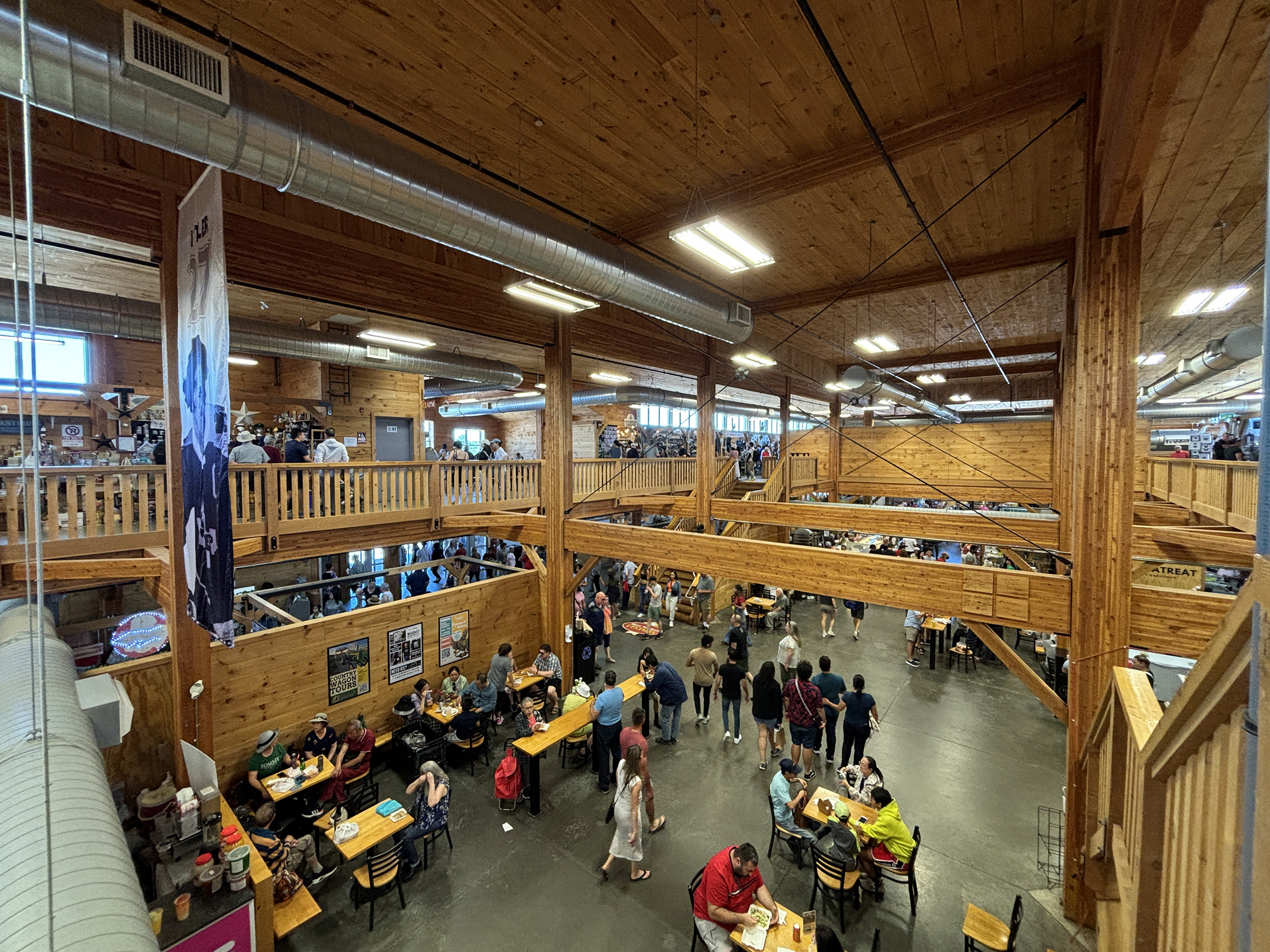
Interior of the market in 2024

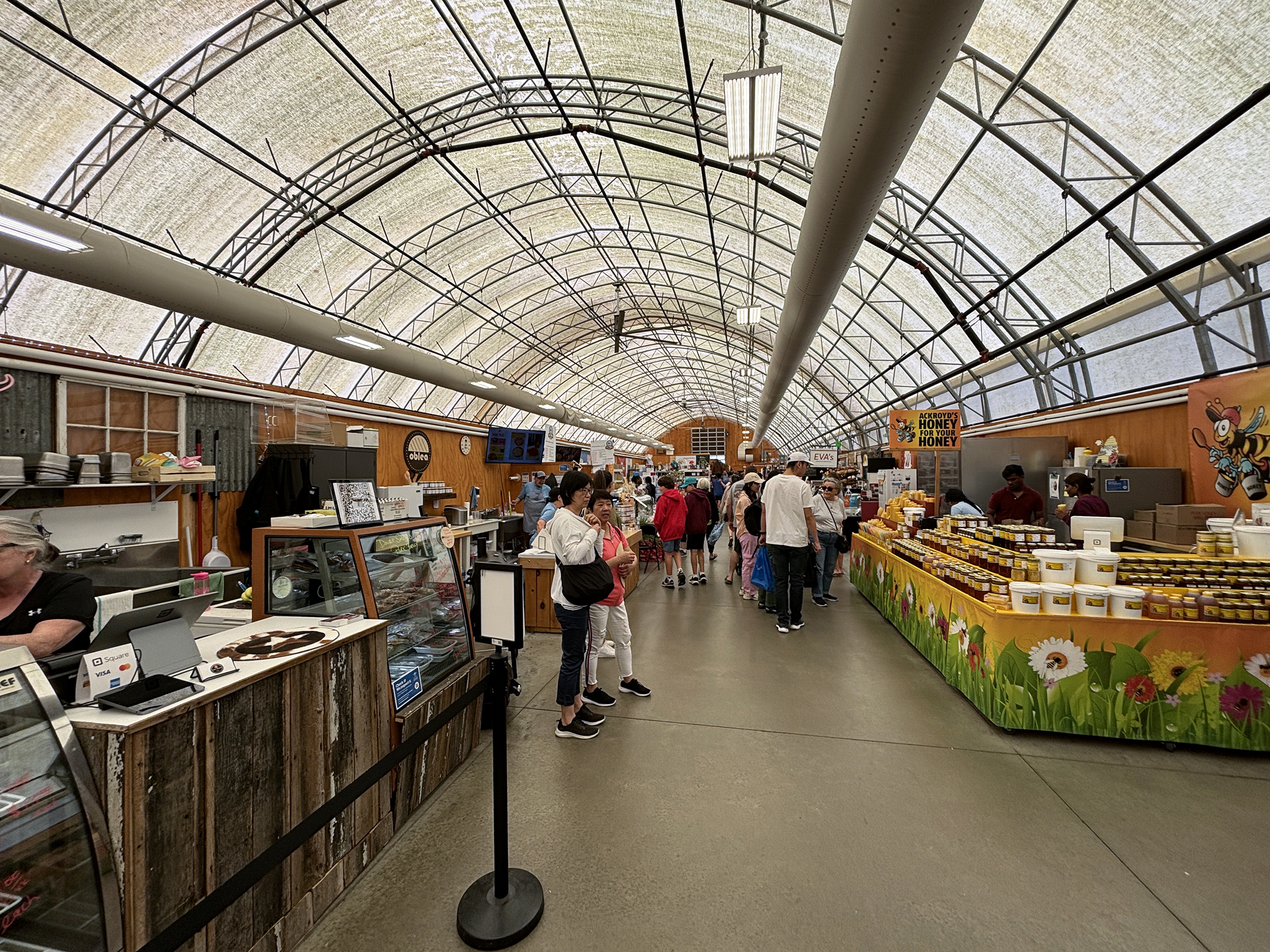
Market tent interior

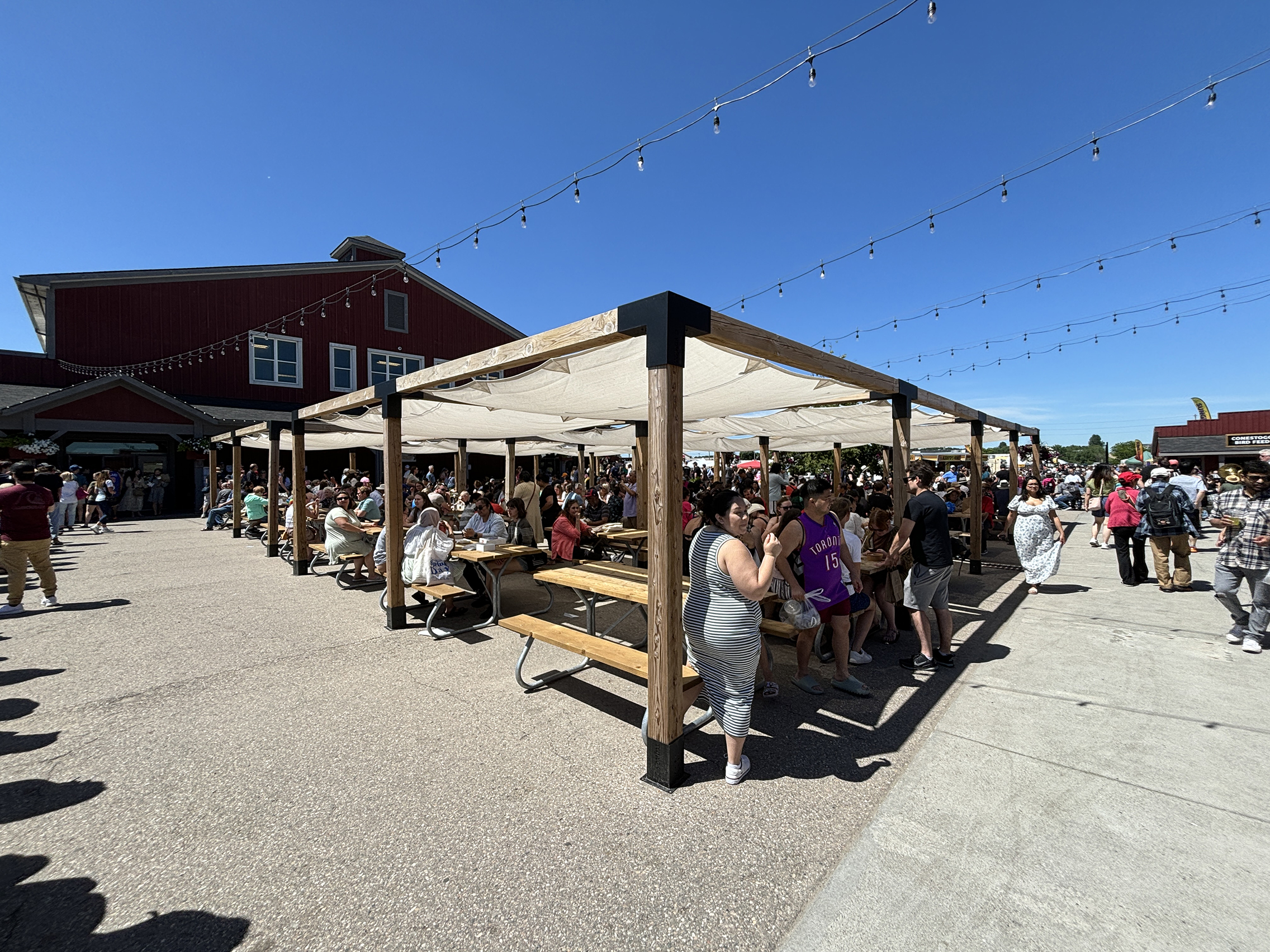
Main courtyard

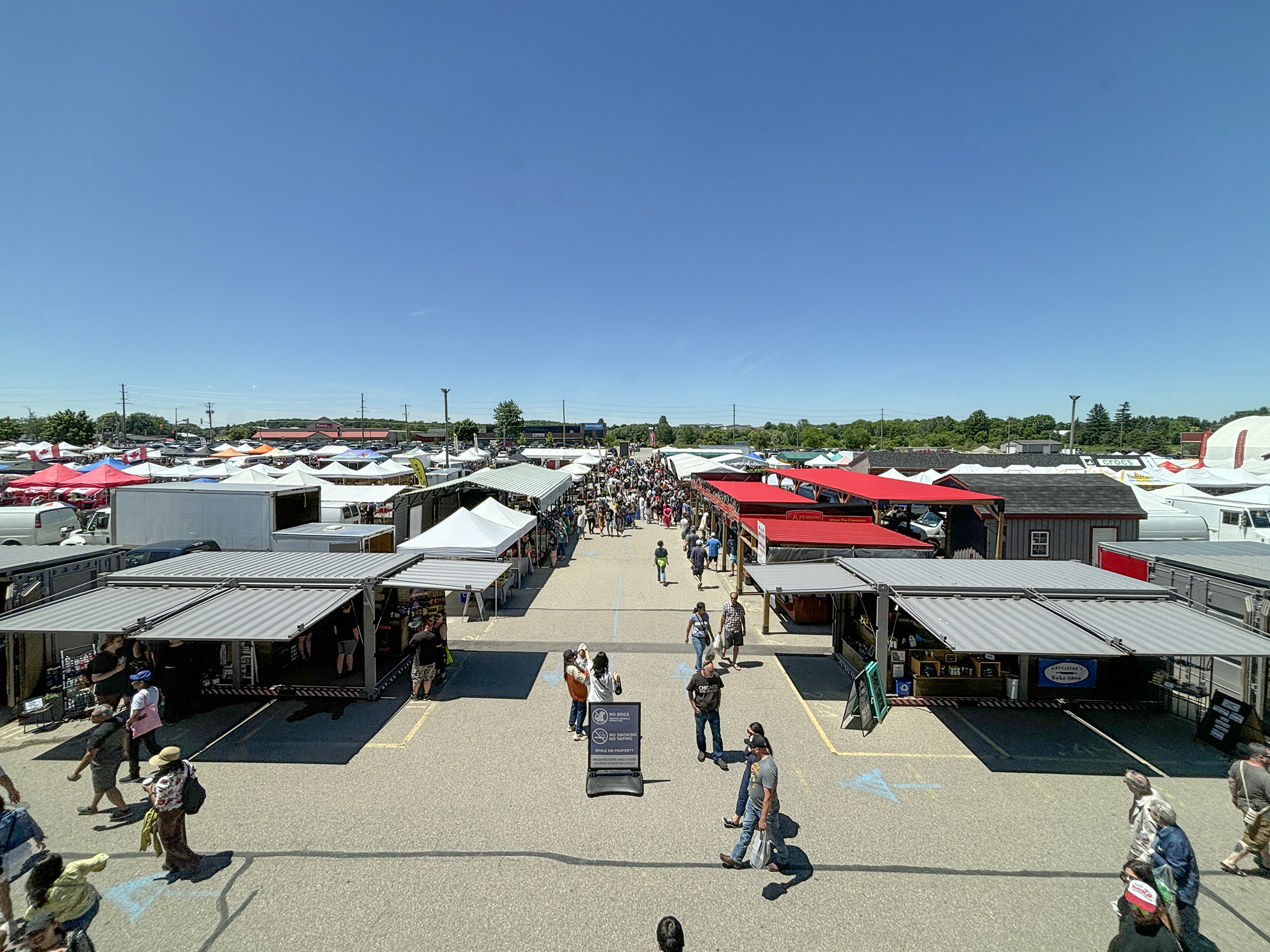
Outdoor market

== Tours ==
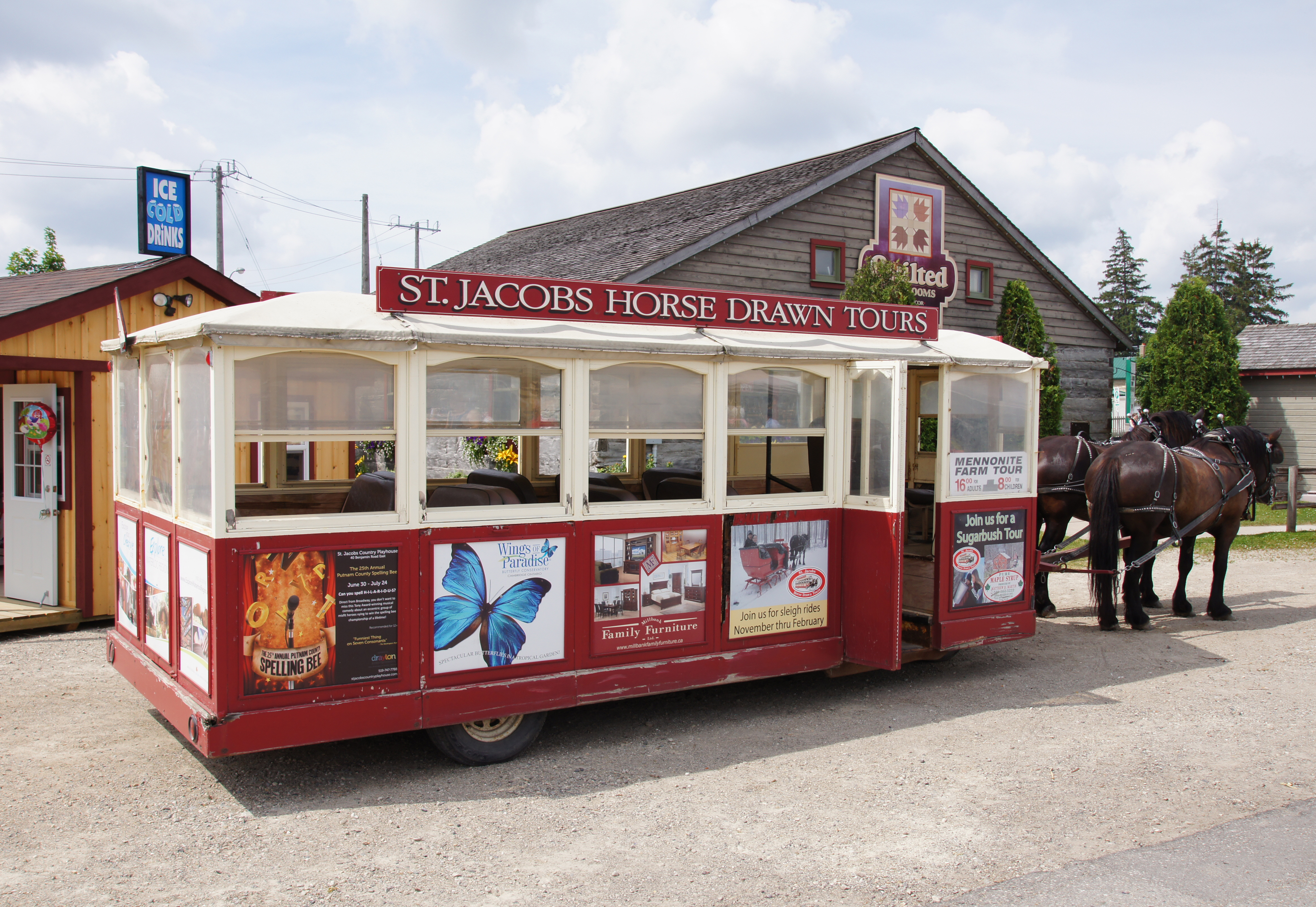
A trolley and two horses stationed in front of and obscuring the Quilted Heirlooms store

The St. Jacobs Horse Drawn Tours operates several horse-drawn trolley tours departing from the log cabin at the St. Jacobs Farmers' Market. The Mennonite Farm Tours, which operates from mid April to the end of October, is a seventy-five-minute tour that includes an Old Order Mennonite farm, during which tourists are taught about Mennonite culture. The Maple Sugar Bush Tours operates from the beginning of March to mid April, taking visitors to a nearby sugar bush to learn about maple syrup production.

Waterloo Central Railway operates a seasonal steam train tour from Waterloo to the village of St. Jacobs and the St. Jacobs Farmers' Market. Trains run on Saturdays from March to October, and on Tuesdays and Thursdays for a shorter duration. The platform is at the eastern end of the site.

A 24 km on-road cycling tour operated by the Woolwich Cycling Group begins at the St. Jacobs Farmers' Market and loops around farms and the village of St. Jacobs, then returns to the St. Jacobs Farmers' Market.

== Nearby ==
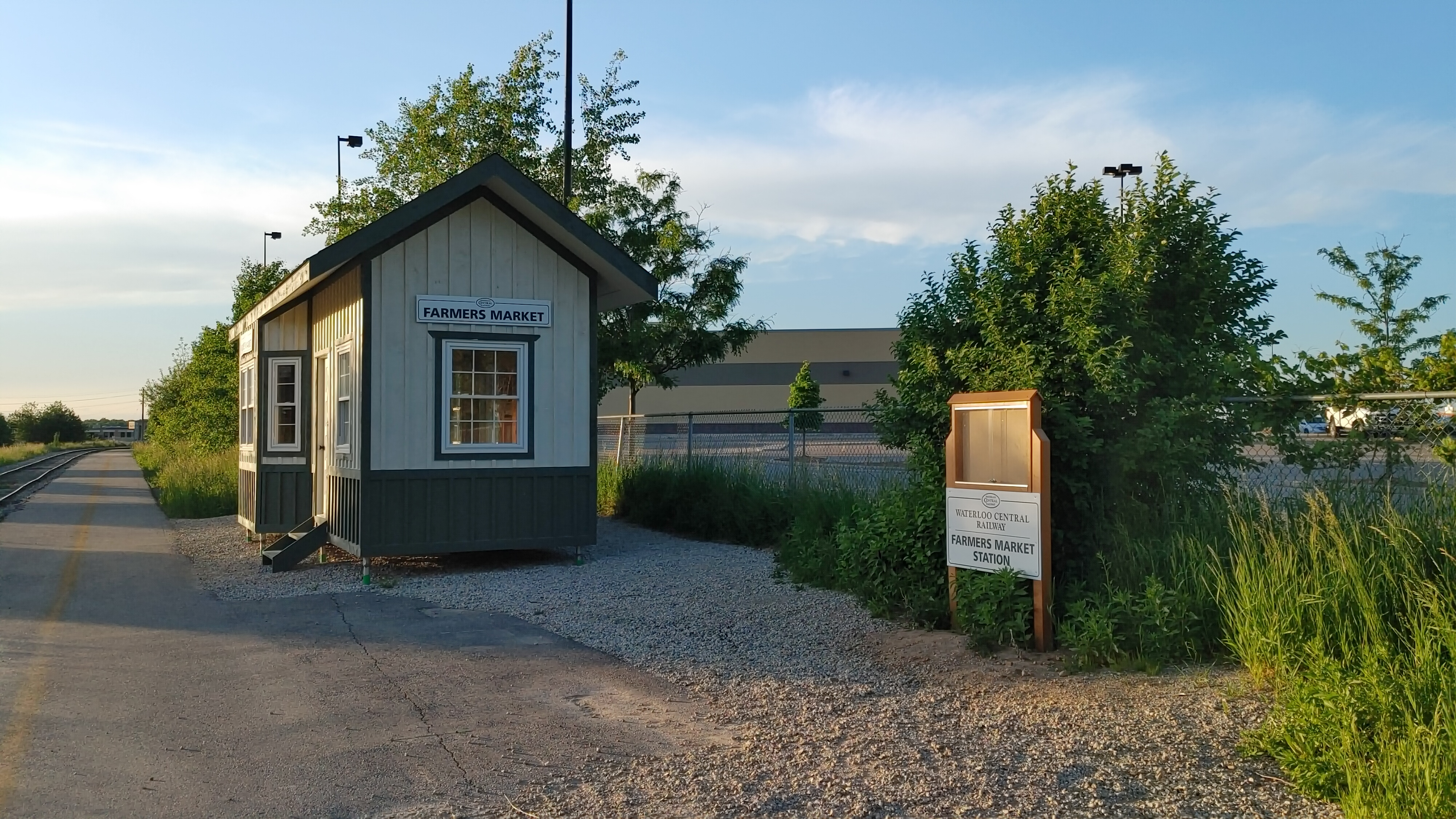
The Farmers' Market station of the Waterloo Central Railway

In the 1990s, the township of Woolwich received an application from the Future Group for the development of a power centre adjacent to the St. Jacobs Farmers' Market, at which would be based a Walmart, other retailers, and office space. The development was supported by the township of Woolwich council, and opposed by several citizen's groups and other parties, including Concerned Citizens of Woolwich Township, the city of Waterloo, the Waterloo Uptown Business Improvement Area, Hudson's Bay Company, and the residential development firm First Gulf Developments. The development was approved by Woolwich council on 23 September 1997.

An open house viewing of the plans and subsequent public discussion was held in St. James Lutheran Church in Elmira in January 2002. The opposing groups appealed the development at the Ontario Municipal Board in 2002, which rendered a decision in 2003 to allow construction of the power centre. Construction began in 2008.

The city of Waterloo receives $340,000 annually from the power centre to compensate it for the power centre's "negative impacts on uptown Waterloo".

== See also ==
- St. Lawrence Market (Toronto)
- Kitchener Farmer's Market

== Notes ==
=== References ===
- Ash, Stacey (22 March 2000). "Big box store proposal revised; Retail plan for site near St. Jacobs Farmers Market still faces opposition". The Record. Metroland Media Group.
- McClinchey, Kelley A.; Carmichael, Barbara A. (2010). "Countryside capital, changing rural landscapes, and rural tourism implications in Mennonite country". Journal of Rural and Community Development. 5 (1): 178–199.
- Clark, Christina (29 October 2013). "Relief Fund now Open for St. Jacobs Farmers' Market Vendors". 570 News, Rogers Media.
- Coppolino, Andrew (22 September 2018). "Who grew your garlic? Andrew Coppolino on market vendors versus farmers". CBC News.
- Davis, Brent (29 November 2017). "Schlegel family buying St. Jacobs Farmers' Market, neighbouring businesses". Waterloo Region Record.
- Davis, Brent; Desmond, Paige (2 September 2013). "Community rallies around destroyed St. Jacobs market building". Waterloo Region Record.
- Demontis, Rita (14 December 2013). "St. Jacobs Farmers' Market back in brand-new barn". Toronto Sun.
- Deschamps, Tara (12 June 2015). "St. Jacobs Market rises from the ashes after 2013 blaze". Toronto Star.
- Desmond, Paige (3 September 2013). "St. Jacobs market will be rebuilt but details are uncertain". Waterloo Region Record.
- Ellison, Marc (2 September 2013). "St. Jacobs farmers market gutted in overnight fire". Toronto Star.
- Gallagher, Susan (28 January 1998). "Big box store development threatens our rural heritage". The Record. Metroland Media Group.
- Grant, Amanda (5 November 2013). "St. Jacobs market charred wood recycled by artisan". CBC News.
- Lunny, Tasha (12 December 2012). "New St. Jacobs Farmers' Market building is open for business". The Record. Metroland Media Group.
- Howitt, Chuck (21 October 2008). "Wal-Mart blends with local esthetic". Waterloo Region Record.
- Pink, Dave (17 January 2002). "Last call to view township's plan". The Record. Metroland Media Group.
- Strathdee, Mike (10 July 1997). "Big stores run into city staff opposition". The Record. Metroland Media Group. p. B1.
- Swayze, Kevin (19 September 2013). "Tent-like shed planned this winter for burned-out St. Jacobs Farmers' Market". The Record. Metroland Media Group.
- "St. Jacobs Farmers' Market fire causes estimated $2M in damage". CBC News. 2 September 2013.
- "St. Jacobs market outdoor section to reopen this week after fire". CBC News. 3 September 2013.
- "Demolition of main St. Jacobs Market building begins". CBC News. 16 September 2013.
- "Community relief for St. Jacobs Farmers' Market vendors announced". CBC News. 12 September 2013.
- "New owners for St. Jacobs Farmers' Market in 2018". CBC News. 29 November 2017.
- "Temporary St. Jacobs Farmers' Market building starting to take shape". The Record. Metroland Media Group. 17 October 2013.
- "Temporary St. Jacobs Farmers' Market building opens Thursday". The Record. Metroland Media Group. 9 December 2013.
- "'Everything is gone': Fire destroys St. Jacobs Farmers' Market". CTV News. 2 September 2013. Archived from the original on September 5, 2013.
- "Roof going up and over St. Jacobs Farmer's market building". Metro. Metroland News Service. 30 October 2013.
- "St. Jacobs Farmers' Market destroyed by fire". Toronto Sun. Sun Media. QMI. 2 September 2013.
- "Maple Sugar Bush Tours". St Jacobs Horse Drawn Tours.
- "Mennonite Farm Tours". St Jacobs Horse Drawn Tours.
- "St. Jacobs Country Tour - 24 km". Woolwich & Surrounding Areas On-road Cycling. Township of Woolwich.
- "St. Jacobs Farmers' Market". St. Jacobs Country.
- "Schedule". Waterloo Central Railway.
