= Victoria Park, Kitchener =

Urban park in Kitchener, Ontario, Canada

Victoria Park
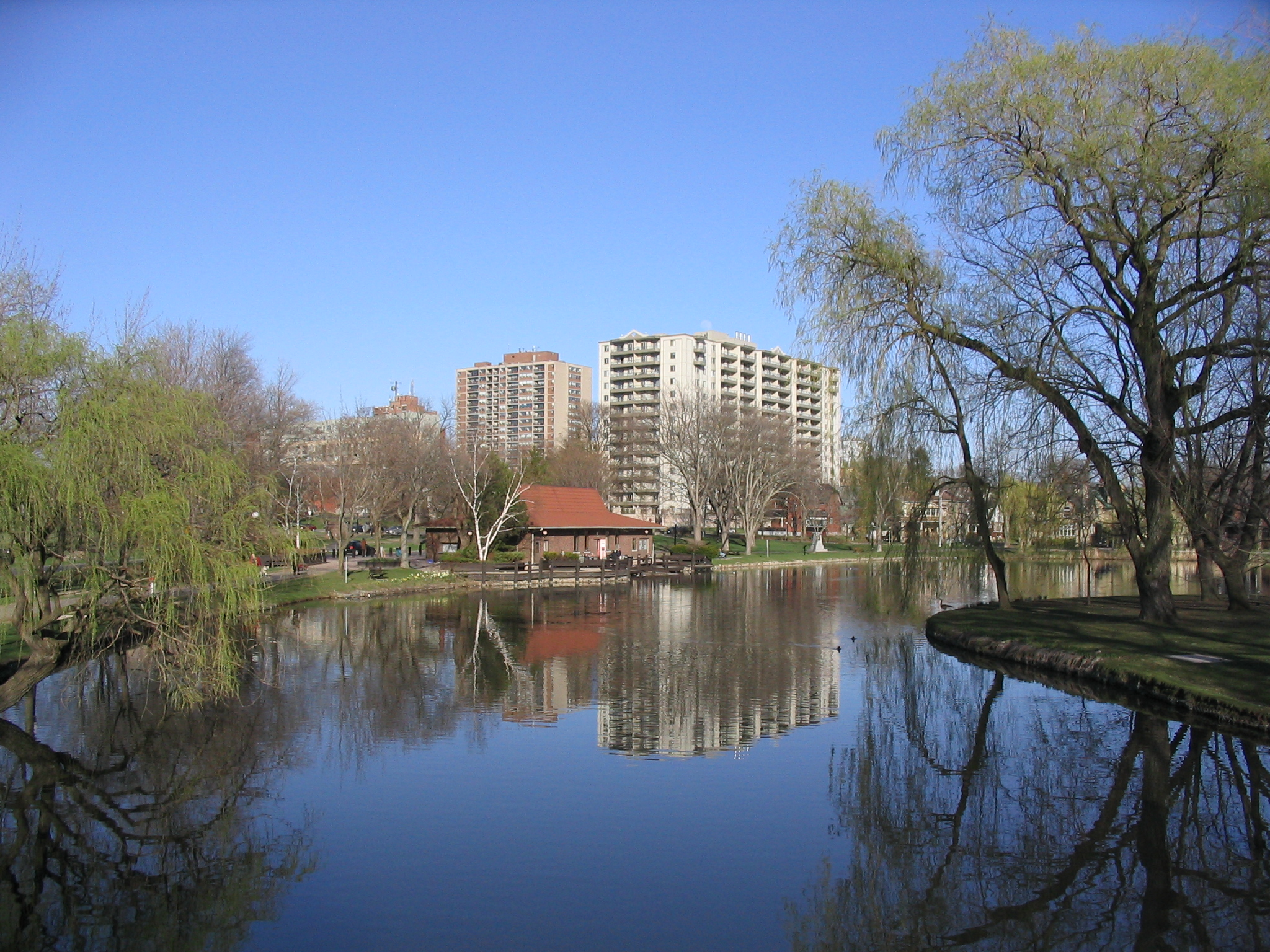
- Interactive map of Victoria Park
- Type: Urban park
- Location: Kitchener, Ontario
- Coordinates: 43.447°N 80.498°W
- Area: 11 hectares (27 acres)
- Created: 1896

Victoria Park is the oldest park in Kitchener, Ontario, Canada, situated downtown. It is the site of numerous events and festivities.

== History ==
Victoria Park's land was used by Indigenous peoples, who celebrated its creek as life-giving. By the 17th century, the Neutral people had a village nearby along Schneider Creek of about 1,000 people, and fished in a trout stream which fed into the creek. In the 19th century, the Mississaugas of the Credit First Nation managed the land and resources of Waterloo Region. Mississauga people lived in many small camps along large rivers during non-winter months. These camps retreated to more forested areas in the summer, including the swamp. It had a good supply of water, firewood, fish, and game. A trail parallel to Schneider Creek passed through the park area, and was used by generations of Indigenous peoples.

According to a 1879 map of Kitchener (then called Berlin), Town Park was located between Mill Street and Highland Road where Highland Courts and Woodside Parks stand today.

In 1895, the city purchased 27 acres (11 ha) of land from S. B. Schneider for $125 per acre (equivalent to $5346 per acre today). The city drained the swamp on the land. This land purchase was initially opposed by some residents for being too far outside of town, however it passed by city council a vote with 4 to 3.

The park opened on August 27, 1896; the lake, bridges and three islands were in place at that time. The Park was named after Queen Victoria ahead of the Diamond Jubilee of Queen Victoria on the British throne. According to Kitchener, an Illustrated History, the park's establishment was part of the City Beautiful movement in North America.

In 1908, then-mayor Allen Huber opened Victoria Park to the public, which required admission at the time, and removed fences around the park. This was against the advisory of the Park Board and led to a confrontation between Huber and J.C. Breithaupt where Breithaupt was punched in the face.

In the fall of 2011, $10.1-million of restoration work on the park's lake was started, and in all 85,000 tonnes of sediment were removed from the lake bottom. Thousands of concrete and stone blocks were placed along the 2.2 kilometres of shoreline as a retaining wall to prevent erosion. While the overall area of the lake was slightly reduced, the waterway near the mouth of Schneider Creek at the north end of the park was widened to create a "fore bay" which slows the flow of water and allows sediment to settle in one place for easy removal.

A major renovation was completed on the Boathouse in 2014. The building had originally been used to store canoes in summer and as a changing room for skaters, but also included a tea house for some years. It was closed between September 2013 and January 2015, and re-opened as a restaurant with indoor and outdoor seating, operated by Mark Forwell, The business closed down in October 2019; the owner was leasing the building from the City of Kitchener and exercised an exit option in the lease.

The city announced in late 2019 that its budget includes $3 million for Victoria Park, to be used over 2021 to 2023 to achieve the results discussed in the master plan. While no single new element will be significant, the funds will allow for a renewal of the existing facilities, including the trees.

As of 2022, various anti-colonialism interests have raised objections to the park continuing to carry the effigy and name of Queen Victoria; the statue has been vandalized, often with red paint; and formal requests for a rename have been submitted, with the suggestion of Willow River Park as one with Aboriginal roots.

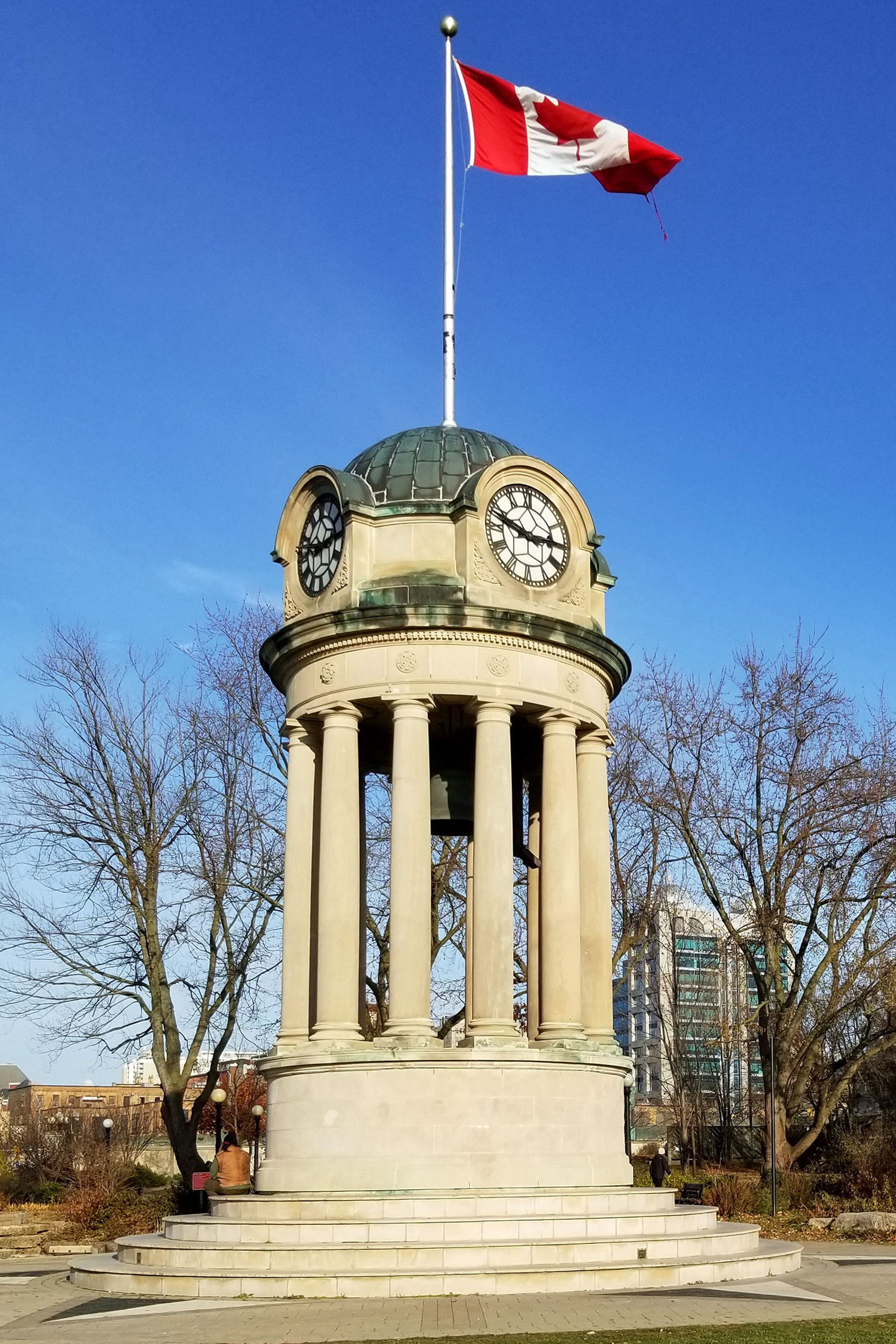
The clock tower, moved to the park in 1975 after the old City Hall was demolished in 1973

== Description and landmarks ==
The human-made Victoria Lake is fed by Schneider Creek, surrounds three small islands, and is crossed by multiple bridges. The park also contains the Victoria Park pavilion, the Victoria Park Gallery and Archives, a bandstand, and a historic boathouse, a pub and music venue.

=== Clock tower ===
The Gaukel street entrance features a clock tower which was once atop the old Kitchener City Hall (from 1924 and now site of Market Square Shopping Centre), and before that, the town's fire hall. It was moved to the park entrance and complemented with a fountain and a sculpture of luggage, by local artist Ernest Daetwyler, symbolizing the various waves of immigration that have contributed the city's history.

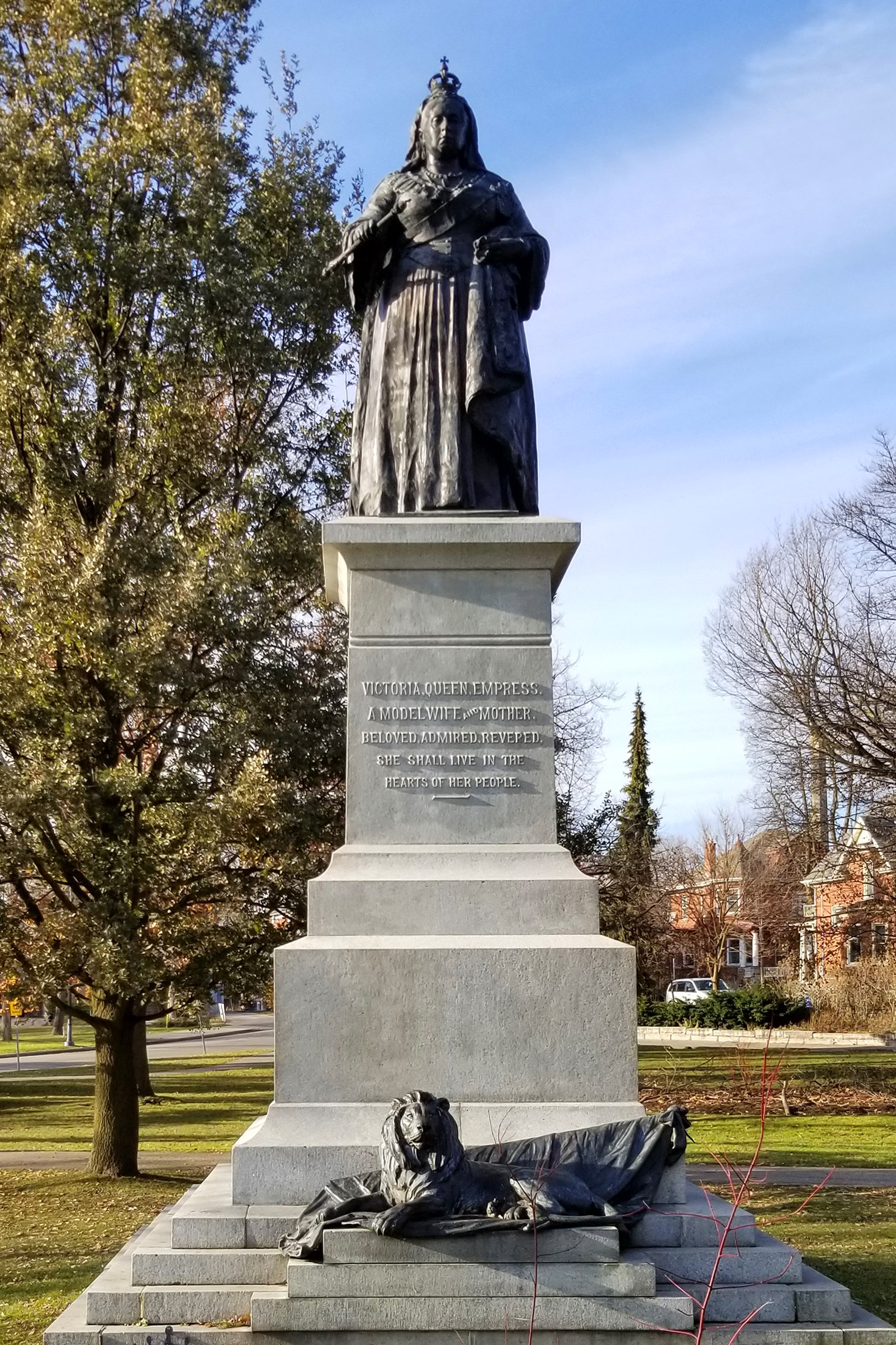
Statue of Queen Victoria in the Park

=== Statue of Queen Victoria ===
A cast-bronze statue of Queen Victoria with a lion at the base of the plinth designed by Cavaliere Raffaele Zaccaquini is located in the park.

Upon Queen Victoria's death in 1901, Berliners began to fundraise money towards a statue in her honour. The Princess of Wales Chapter of the IODE raised the $6,000 needed for the monument, one of their fundraisers being the raffle of a Seagram race horse.

Zaccaquini was commissioned to create the statue but delays in its completion led to him sending a statue of a lion out of embarrassment. The Victoria statue was unveiled in May 1911, on Victoria Day, the tenth anniversary of her death.

=== Statue of Wilhelm I, German Emperor ===
Bust of Kaiser Wilhelm I Victoria Park with view of lake and residential homes in background.

In 1897, a large statue of Kaiser Wilhelm I, made by Reinhold Begas and shipped from Germany, was installed at in the park to honour the region's prominent German-Canadian population . The statue was 4.3 m (14 ft) tall and featured a bronze bust atop a granite pedestal. It was removed and thrown into the lake by vandals on August 22, 1914 at the beginning of the First World War.

The bust was recovered from the lake and moved to the nearby Concordia club, but it was stolen again February 15, 1916, marched through the streets by a mob, made up largely of soldiers from the 118th Battalion, and has never been seen again. The 118th Battalion was rumoured to have melted down the bust to make napkin rings given to its members. A monument with a plaque outlining the story of the original bust was erected in the park in 1996.

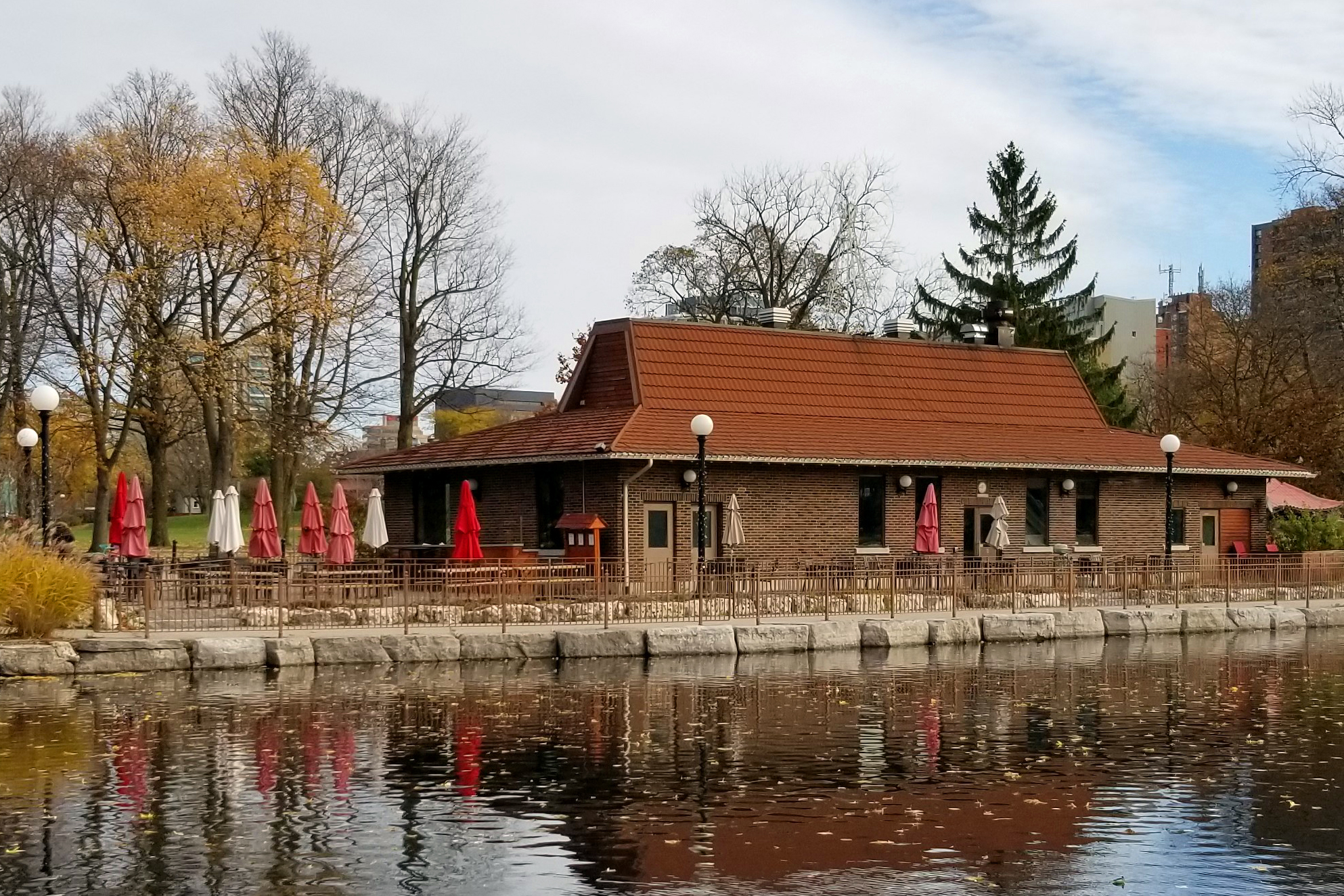
The Boathouse, after the October 2019 closure of the restaurant business

=== Pavillion ===
A pavilion designed by Charles Knechtel was first introduced to the park in 1902 as a response to complaints that there was nowhere to seek shelter when it started to rain. The structure cost $3,100 and its opening featured a band and fireworks. The building burned down on March 24, 1916 and deemed too damaged to recover. An investigation conducted by the Ontario Fire Marshal failed to conclude a cause but the investigator noted an empty gas can near the restaurant of the building.

A second pavilion, borrowing heavily from Knechtel's original design, was built in 1924. Situated on the same spot as the original, the front of the pavilion faces the water, whereas the original faced the park's main island.

== Events ==
Victoria Park is home to Victoria Parkrun, Kitchener, a free 5K held every Saturday morning.

== See also ==
- Victoria Park station
- Schneider Haus
- Royal eponyms in Canada
