= Weber Street =

Road in Kitchener and Waterloo, Ontario, Canada

- Waterloo Regional Road 8
- Former names: East Avenue; Solon Avenue; Sunnyside Street

Weber Street (/ˈwiːbər/, WEE-bər) is a major roadway connecting the cities of Kitchener and Waterloo in Ontario, Canada. It forms a component of Waterloo Regional Road 8, whose route designation continues along several other roads in south Kitchener and Cambridge. Weber Street is considered an east–west street within the Kitchener street system, and a north–south street in Waterloo, similarly to King Street. It runs parallel and to the east of King Street for much of its length.

== History ==
The street is likely named after one of the Germans from Pennsylvania who migrated to the region It is the only remaining major street in Kitchener Waterloo with a name of German origin or named for German settlers in the region.

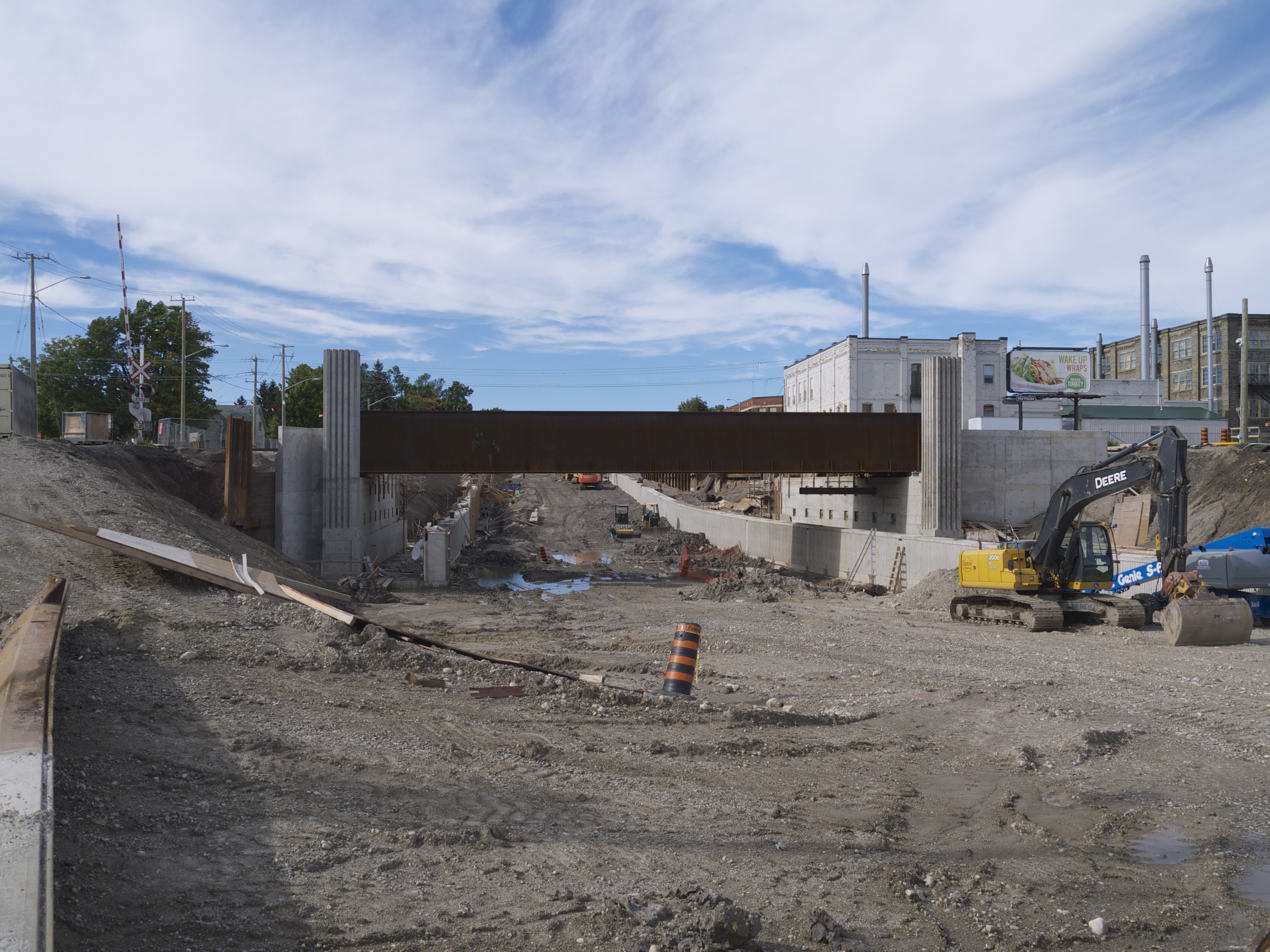
Construction of the underpass in 2014.

In 2013–14, the Region of Waterloo widened the last remaining two-lane stretch of roadway between College Street in Kitchener and Union Street in Waterloo, a project which resulted in the demolition of dozens of homes and other buildings along the street. The same project also resulted in the creation of the Weber Street Railway Underpass, grade separating the roadway and sidewalks from the Guelph Subdivision railway line, the latter of which runs overhead. The Guelph Subdivision forms a component of the Canadian National Railway mainline west of Toronto. The segment of the Guelph Subdivision which crosses Weber Street has been owned by Metrolinx since 2014.

== Geography ==
Weber Street's southern terminus is at the southern stub of King Street in Kitchener, and its northern terminus is at its intersection with King Street at the St. Jacobs Farmers' Market south of St. Jacobs. In addition to its two endpoints, Weber Street also crosses King Street in Waterloo, being generally northeast of King Street in Kitchener and southern Waterloo, and southwest of King Street in northern Waterloo.

Weber weaves through residential and commercial areas of Waterloo and Kitchener and is agricultural at the northern terminus.

The road is broken up into four parts due to the geographical direction of the road:

Kitchener

- Weber Street East - Florence Avenue to Queen Street North
- Weber Street West - Queen Street North to the Kitchener-Waterloo Boundary near Raitar Avenue

Waterloo

- Weber Street South - Kitchener-Waterloo Boundary near Raitar Avenue to Erb Street East
- Weber Street North - Erb Street East to King Street North south of St. Jacobs, Ontario

=== Crossings and intersections ===
Weber Street intersects with a number of east–west thoroughfares:

- Conestoga Parkway
- Ottawa Street
- Frederick Street
- Victoria Street
- Erb Street
- Bridgeport Road
- University Avenue
- Columbia Street
- King Street (in three different places)
- Northfield Drive

== Places of interest ==
- St. Jacobs Farmers' Market
- Bridgeport Plaza
- Kitchener station
- Downtown Community Centre (Kitchener)
- Kitchener Memorial Auditorium Complex (on nearby East Avenue)
- St. Peter's Lutheran Cemetery
- Eastwood Collegiate Institute

== See also ==
- List of numbered roads in Waterloo Region
