= List of numbered roads in Waterloo Region =

The following is a list of numbered roads in the Regional Municipality of Waterloo, Ontario. Regional roads are maintained by the Waterloo Region Transportation Department, and highways are maintained by the Ontario Ministry of Transportation, except where they are locally maintained as Connecting Links.

== Regional roads ==
Waterloo Regional Road 17 (Fountain Street) facing south alongside the Grand River

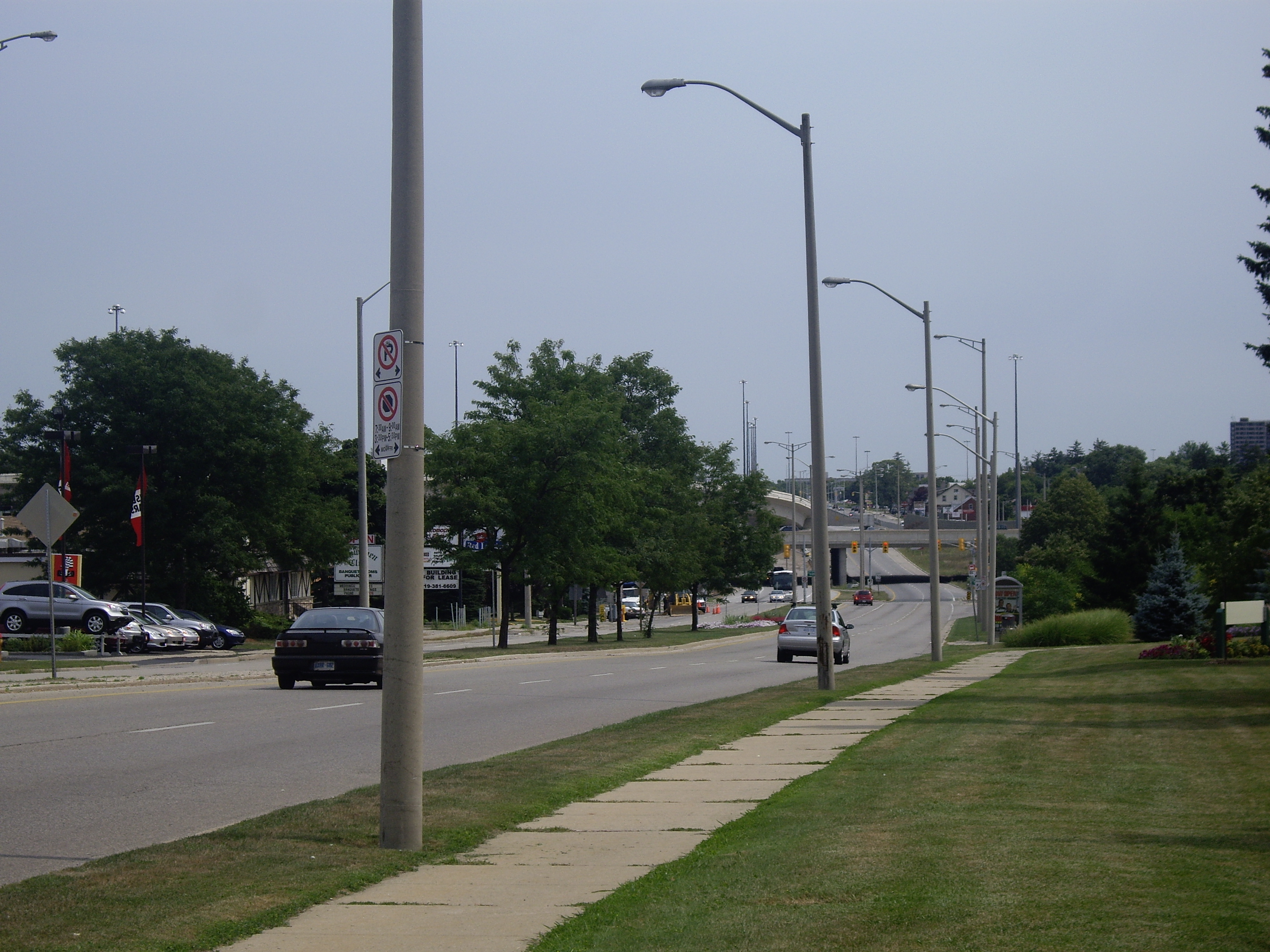
King Street north of the half-cloverleaf interchange with Highway 8 in Kitchener, looking south

Route	Local Name(s)	Type	Northern/Western Terminus	Southern/Eastern Terminus	Communities	Comments
Waterloo Regional Road 1	Snyder's Road, Waterloo Street, Huron Street, Wilmot-Easthope Road		110m South of Huron Road	RR 6 (Gingerich Road)	New Hamburg, Baden	
Waterloo Regional Road 3	Walker Road		Highway 7 & 8	Oxford-Waterloo Road		Minor rural route
Waterloo Regional Road 4	Huron Street, Peel Street, Bleams Road, Ottawa Street	Arterial road	RR 1 (Waterloo Street)	RR 54 (Lackner Boulevard), Keewatin Avenue	New Hamburg, Mannheim, Kitchener	Intersects the Conestoga Parkway twice. Ottawa Street proposed extension from Keewatin Avenue to RR 17 (Fountain Street Breslau)
Waterloo Regional Road 5	Manser Road, William Hastings Line, Hutchison Road, Queen's Bush Road, Nafziger Road		RR 86	Highway 7 & 8	Wellesley, Linwood	
Waterloo Regional Road 6	Gingerich Road, Snyders Road, Highland Road, Queen Street, Benton Street, Frederick Street	Arterial road	RR 51 (Foundry Street)	RR 61 (Bruce Street)	Baden, Kitchener	
Waterloo Regional Road 7	Hutchison Road, Perth Line		RR 5 (Queen's Bush Road)	Road 105	Wellesley	
Waterloo Regional Road 8	King Street, Weber Street, Shantz Hill Road, Fountain Street, Coronation Boulevard, Dundas Street		RR 17 (Sawmill Road)	RR 43 (Branchton Road) / Highway 8	St. Jacobs, Waterloo, Kitchener, Cambridge	Formerly Highway 8 between Freeport Diversion and RR 43 (Branchton Road)
Waterloo Regional Road 9	Wilmot-Easthope Road, Erb's Road, Erb Street, Caroline Street, Bridgeport Road		Perth County Road 43	RR 29 (Lancaster Street)	St. Agatha, Waterloo, Bridgeport	
Waterloo Regional Road 10	Herrgott Road	Arterial road	RR 86 (Line 86)	RR 15 (Lobsinger Line)	St. Clements, Wallenstein	
Waterloo Regional Road 11	William Hastings Line	Rural route	Road 116	RR 5 (Manser Road)	Perth County boundary	
Waterloo Regional Road 12	Gerber Road, Notre Dame Drive, Queen Street, Bridge Street, New Dundee Road		RR 5 (Nafziger Road)	RR 28 (Homer Watson Boulevard)	Wellesley, St. Agatha, New Dundee, Doon	
Waterloo Regional Road 14	Kressler Road, Weimar Line, Moser-Young Road		RR 12 (Gerber Road/Notre Dame Drive)	RR 70 (Erbsville Road)	Bamberg	
Waterloo Regional Road 15	Lobsinger Line, King Street	Arterial road	RR 5 (Hutchison Road)	Dixon Street/Montgomery Road	St. Clements, Heidelberg, Waterloo, Kitchener	
Waterloo Regional Road 16	Kressler Road		RR 17 (Hawkesville Road)	RR 70 (Erbsville Road)	Heidelberg, Erbsville	
Waterloo Regional Road 17	Fountain Street, Ebycrest Road, Sawmill Road, Northside Drive, Hawkesville Road, Ament Line		RR 5 (Manser Road)	Highway 8	St. Jacobs, Conestogo, Bloomingdale, Breslau, Cambridge	
Waterloo Regional Road 19	Floradale Road		Florapine Road	RR 86	Floradale	
Waterloo Regional Road 20	Bloomingdale Road		RR 52 (Bridge Street)	RR 17 (Ebycrest Road/Sawmill Road)	Bridgeport	
Waterloo Regional Road 21	Arthur Street		Floradale Road	RR 85 (Listowel Road)	Elmira, North Woolwich	
Waterloo Regional Road 22	Northfield Drive		Wellington County limits	RR 15 (King Street)	Waterloo, Conestogo	
Waterloo Regional Road 23	Katherine Street		Woolwich-Pilkington Townline	RR 17 (Sawmill Road)	Winterbourne, Zuber Corners	
Waterloo Regional Road 24	Hespeler Road, Water Street, Ainslie Street		Wellington County limits	RR 81 (McQueen Shaver Boulevard) / Highway 24	Glenchristie, Cambridge	Formerly Highway 24
Waterloo Regional Road 25	Maryhill Road		Woolwich-Guelph Townline	RR 26 (St. Charles Street)	Maryhill, Bloomingdale	
Waterloo Regional Road 26	St. Charles Street		RR 17 (Sawmill Road)	RR 25 (Maryhill Road)	Maryhill, Bloomingdale	
Waterloo Regional Road 27	Clyde Road, Samuelson Street, Beverly Street, Wellington Street, Main Street, Queen's Square, North Square, South Square		RR 42 (George Street)	Village Road	Cambridge, Clyde	
Waterloo Regional Road 28	Homer Watson Boulevard, Fountain Street		RR 4 (Ottawa Street)	RR 8 (Shantz Hill Road)	Cambridge, Doon, Kitchener	Includes small section of Huron Road from on and off ramps to Homer Watson Boulevard.
Waterloo Regional Road 29	Lancaster Street		RR 52 (Bridge Street)	RR 55 (Victoria Street)	Kitchener, Bridgeport	
Waterloo Regional Road 30	Shantz Station Road		RR 26 (St. Charles Street)	RR 31 (Kossuth Road)	Kossuth	
Waterloo Regional Road 31	Kossuth Road		RR 17 (Fountain Street)	RR 24 (Hespeler Road)	Kossuth	
Waterloo Regional Road 33	Townline Road		Wellington County Road 34	Gore Road	Cambridge	
Waterloo Regional Road 36	Franklin Boulevard		Highway 401	RR 81 (McQueen Shaver Boulevard)	Cambridge	
Waterloo Regional Road 37	Allen Street		RR 9 (Caroline Street)	RR 15 (King Street)	Uptown Waterloo	
Waterloo Regional Road 38	Sportsworld Drive, Maple Grove Road		RR 8 (King Street)	RR 24 (Hespeler Road)	Kitchener	
Waterloo Regional Road 39	Eagle Street, Pinebush Road	Arterial road	RR 8 (King Street)	RR 33 (Townline Road)	Cambridge	
Waterloo Regional Road 41	Bishop Street		RR 8 (King Street)	RR 36 (Franklin Boulevard)	Cambridge	
Waterloo Regional Road 42	Blair Road, George Street		RR 28 (Fountain Street)	RR 75 (St. Andrews Street)	Cambridge	
Waterloo Regional Road 43	Myers Road, Branchton Road		Highway 24	Brant County Road 144	Cambridge, Littles Corners, Branchton	
Waterloo Regional Road 45	East River Road		Highway 24	Brant county limits		
Waterloo Regional Road 46	Roseville Road		Regional Road 58	Cambridge city limits	Roseville, Orrs Lake	Shares roadway with Regional Road 71 between Dickie Settlement Road and Edworthy Sideroad
Waterloo Regional Road 47	Dumfries Road		Regional Road 46	Regional Road 49	Wrigley	
Waterloo Regional Road 49	Wrigley Road, Scott Street, Main Street, Stanley Street		Regional Road 58	Regional Road 75	Wrigley, Ayr	
Waterloo Regional Road 50	Northfield Drive, Westmount Road		Regional Road 15	Regional Road 58	Kitchener, Waterloo	
Waterloo Regional Road 51	Foundry Street, Wilmot Centre Road		Regional Road 1	Regional Road 4	Baden, Wilmot Centre	
Waterloo Regional Road 52	Bridge Street		RR 22 (Northfield Drive)	Regional Road 17	Waterloo, Bridgeport	
Waterloo Regional Road 53	Courtland Avenue, Fairway Road		Regional Road 6	RR 17 (Fountain Street)	Kitchener	
Waterloo Regional Road 54	Lackner Boulevard		Highway 7	RR 53 (Fairway Road)	Kitchener	
Waterloo Regional Road 55	Victoria Street		RR 70 (Ira Needles Boulevard)	Highway 85, RR 17 (Fountain Street)	Kitchener	Continues past Highway 85 as both Highway 7 and RR 55
Waterloo Regional Road 56	Bleams Road, River Road		RR 70 (Trussler Road), RR 8 (King Street)	Wilson Avenue, RR 53 (Fairway Road)	Kitchener	Bleams Road extension from RR 69 to Wilson Avenue opened August 2025.. To be connected from RR 8 to Wabanaki Drive and Goodrich Drive as part of RR56 completion.
Waterloo Regional Road 57	University Avenue	Arterial road	RR 70 (Ira Needles Boulevard)	RR 52 (Bridge Street)	Waterloo	Name derives from the universities of Waterloo and Wilfrid Laurier, which it serves.
Waterloo Regional Road 58	Bearinger Road, Fischer-Hallman Road, Roseville Road, Northumberland Street, Stanley Street, Swan Street		RR 50 (Westmount Road)	Brant-Waterloo Road	Waterloo, Kitchener, Roseville, Ayr	
Waterloo Regional Road 61	Bruce Street		RR 55 (Victoria Street)	RR 6 (Frederick Street)	Kitchener	
Waterloo Regional Road 62	Edna Street		RR 55 (Victoria Street)	RR 6 (Frederick Street)	Kitchener	
Waterloo Regional Road 63	Duke Street		RR 68 (Francis Street)	RR 6 (Frederick Street)	Kitchener	
Waterloo Regional Road 64	Charles Street		RR 55 (Victoria Street)	RR 4 (Ottawa Street)	Kitchener	
Waterloo Regional Road 66	Borden Avenue		Unnamed laneway connecting Borden Avenue and Grenville Avenue	RR 64 (Charles Street)	Kitchener	
Waterloo Regional Road 67	Hayward Avenue		230m West of RR 53 (Courtland Avenue)	RR 53 (Courtland Avenue)	Kitchener	
Waterloo Regional Road 68	Francis Street		RR 63 (Duke Street)	RR 15 (King Street)	Kitchener	
Waterloo Regional Road 69	Manitou Drive		RR 53 (Fairway Road)	RR 28 (Homer Watson Boulevard)	Kitchener	
Waterloo Regional Road 70	Erbsville Road, Ira Needles Boulevard, Trussler Road		RR 14 & 16 (Kressler Road)	Brant Waterloo Road	Erbsville, Waterloo, Kitchener, Mannheim, Plumtree	
Waterloo Regional Road 71	Dickie Settlement Road, Roseville Road, Edworthy Sideroad	Rural route	Regional Road 28	Regional Road 97	North Dumfries	
Waterloo Regional Road 75	Spragues Road, St. Andrews Street		Regional Road 76 (Grand Avenue)	Brant-Waterloo Road	Cambridge	Formerly Highway 24A
Waterloo Regional Road 76	Grand Avenue		RR 75 (St. Andrews Street)	RR 97 (Cedar Street)	Cambridge	
Waterloo Regional Road 77	Park Hill Road		RR 42 (George Street)	RR 24 (Ainslie Street)	Cambridge	
Waterloo Regional Road 80	Can-Amera Parkway		Highway 24	RR 33 (Townline Road)	Cambridge	
Waterloo Regional Road 81	McQueen Shaver Boulevard		Highway 24	RR 36 (Franklin Boulevard)	Cambridge, North Dumfries	South boundary road, to be extended to RR 33 (Townline Road)
Waterloo Regional Road 85	Listowel Road, Arthur Street South	Rural route	RR 86	RR 15 (King Street) / Highway 85 (Conestoga Parkway)	Elmira	Formerly Highway 85
Waterloo Regional Road 86	Church Street, Line 86		Red Woods Drive	Sideroad 16	Macton, Wallenstein, Elmira, Zuber Corners, Weissenburg	Formerly Highway 86
Waterloo Regional Road 97	Cedar Creek Road, Cedar Street, Concession Street, Main Street, Old Beverly Road		RR 70 (Trussler Road)	Hamilton city (old Wentworth County) limits	Cambridge, North Dumfries	Formerly Highway 97

== Former regional roads ==
Route	Local Name(s)	Type	Northern/Western Terminus	Southern/Eastern Terminus	Communities	Comments
Waterloo Regional Road 48	Kings Road, Reichert Drive		RR 12 (New Dundee Road)	RR 46 (Roseville Road)	Kitchener	
Waterloo Regional Road 44	Lockie Road		Highway 24	RR 43 (Branchton Road)		Minor rural route

== Provincial Highways ==
The following is a list of provincially maintained highways in Waterloo Region. Communities are ordered by where the route encounters them (either from south to north or from west to east).

Route	Type	Local Name(s)	Western/Southern Terminus	Eastern/Northern Terminus	Communities	Comments							
Route	Type	Local Name(s)	Western/Southern Terminus	Eastern/Northern Terminus	Communities	Comments	Highway 7	Partial controlled access highway	Conestoga Parkway, Waterloo Regional Road 55 (Victoria Street)	Waterloo Regional Road 1 (to Stratford)	Woolwich Guelph Townline Road (to Guelph)	New Hamburg, Kitchener, Breslau	Part of the Conestoga Parkway. Shares the route with Highway 8, becoming Highway 7/8, from Kitchener to Stratford.
Highway 8	Partial controlled access highway	Conestoga Parkway,	Highway 401	Waterloo Regional Road 1 (to Stratford)	Cambridge, Kitchener, New Hamburg	Part of the Conestoga Parkway. Shares the route with Highway 7, becoming Highway 7/8, from Kitchener to Stratford.							
Highway 24	Arterial road	Brantford Highway	Lockie Road	Waterloo Regional Road 24	Cambridge	Becomes Waterloo Regional Road 24 (Water Street) near Cambridge city limits.							
Highway 85	Full controlled access highway	Conestoga Parkway	Highway 7 (at Victoria Street)	Waterloo Regional Road 85	Kitchener, Waterloo	Part of the Conestoga Parkway. Becomes Waterloo Regional Road 85 (Arthur Street) near Waterloo city limits. Only highway entirely within the region.							
Highway 401	Full controlled access highway		Waterloo Regional Road 70	Waterloo Regional Road 33	Kitchener, Cambridge								
