= Kitchener City Hall =

City Hall of Kitchener, Ontario, Canada

Coordinates: 43°27′05″N 80°29′33″W

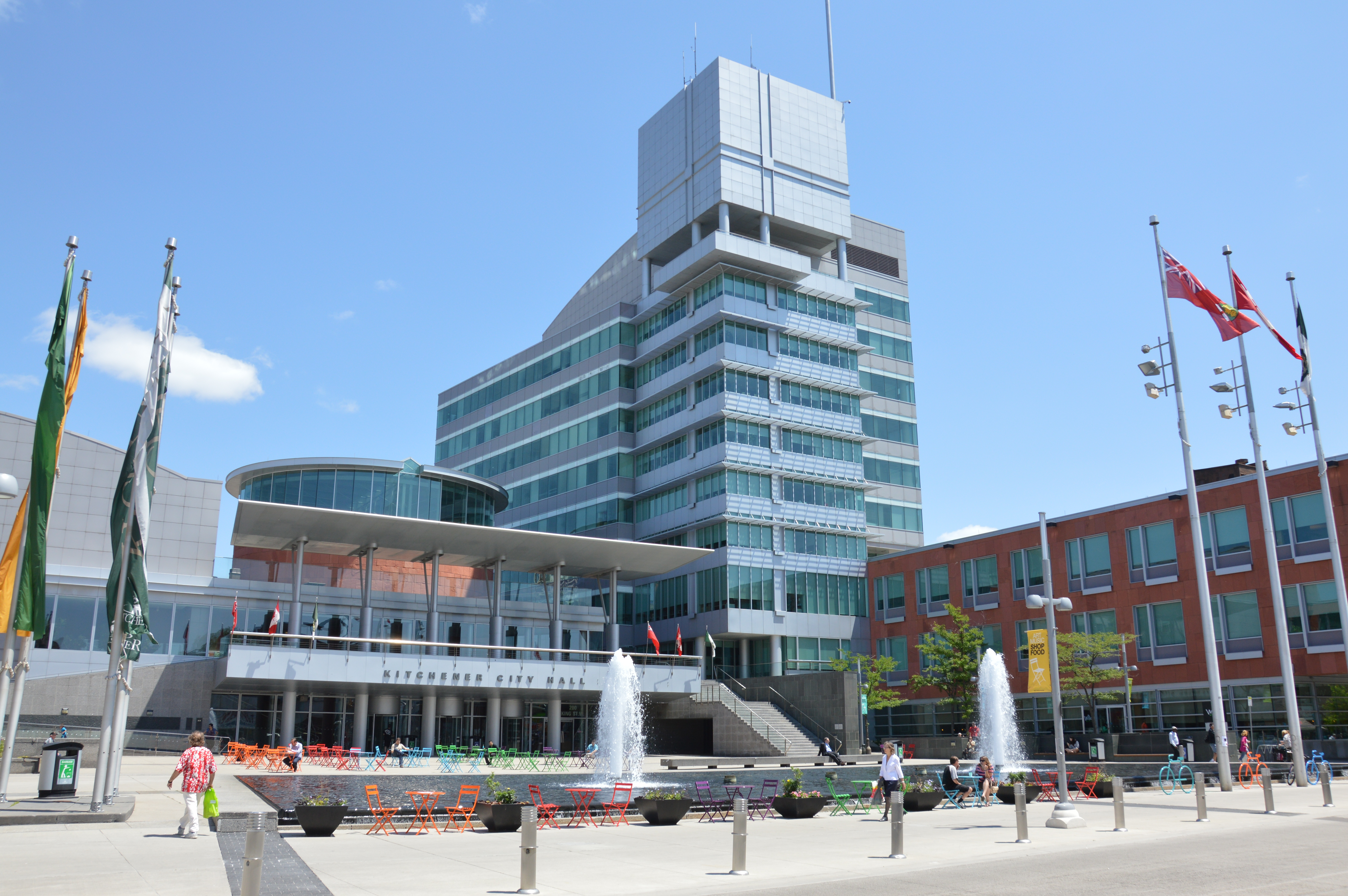
- Kitchener's present City Hall was built in 1993.
- Interactive map of the Kitchener City Hall area

General information
- Location: 200 King Street West, Kitchener, Ontario, Canada
- Inaugurated: 1993
- Owner: City of Kitchener

Kitchener City Hall is the seat of municipal government of Kitchener, Ontario, Canada. It has gone through many iterations through the 20th century, culminating in the current building, which opened in 1993.

== History ==
The original location of the municipal seat was on the block bound by King, Frederick, Duke and Scott streets and home today to Market Square Shopping Centre; the first city hall was built in 1919 by William Henry Eugene Schmalz (son of Mayor W.H. Schmalz) faced King, with the area towards Duke hosting the weekly Kitchener Farmer's Market (operating from 1869 to 1872 which relocated to building in rear), rebuilt 1907 and lasted until 1973. The last of the city halls on the site was built in 1924 replacing the Victorian structure topped with a clockless cupola (and with a Weather vane) with a three-story Renaissance Revival (similar to St. Lawrence Hall in Toronto) porticoed building topped with a clock tower. It was demolished in 1973 in a decision controversial to this day. The stones and workings of the clock tower were labelled and stored. While City Hall moved, the Farmer's Market was relocated within the same small location (in Market Square Mall) from 1973 to 2004.

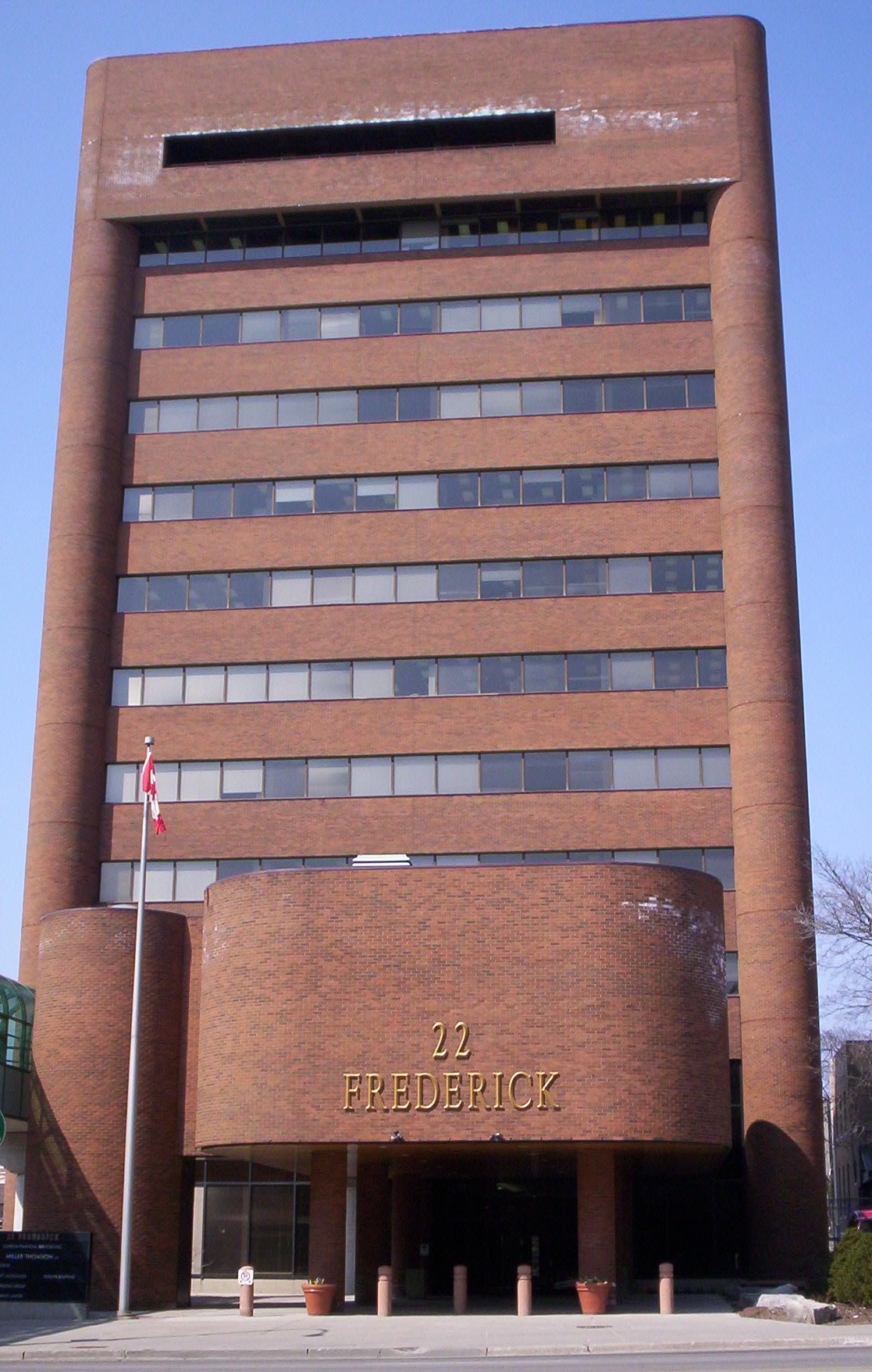
The Oxlea Tower was used for city offices starting in 1973.

The city moved its offices across Frederick Street to the upper floors of the Oxlea office tower in 1973. Municipal affairs continued in leased space at this unremarkable location for the next twenty years; the former site was converted to the Market Square shopping centre, which housed the Farmers' Market below its parking garage.

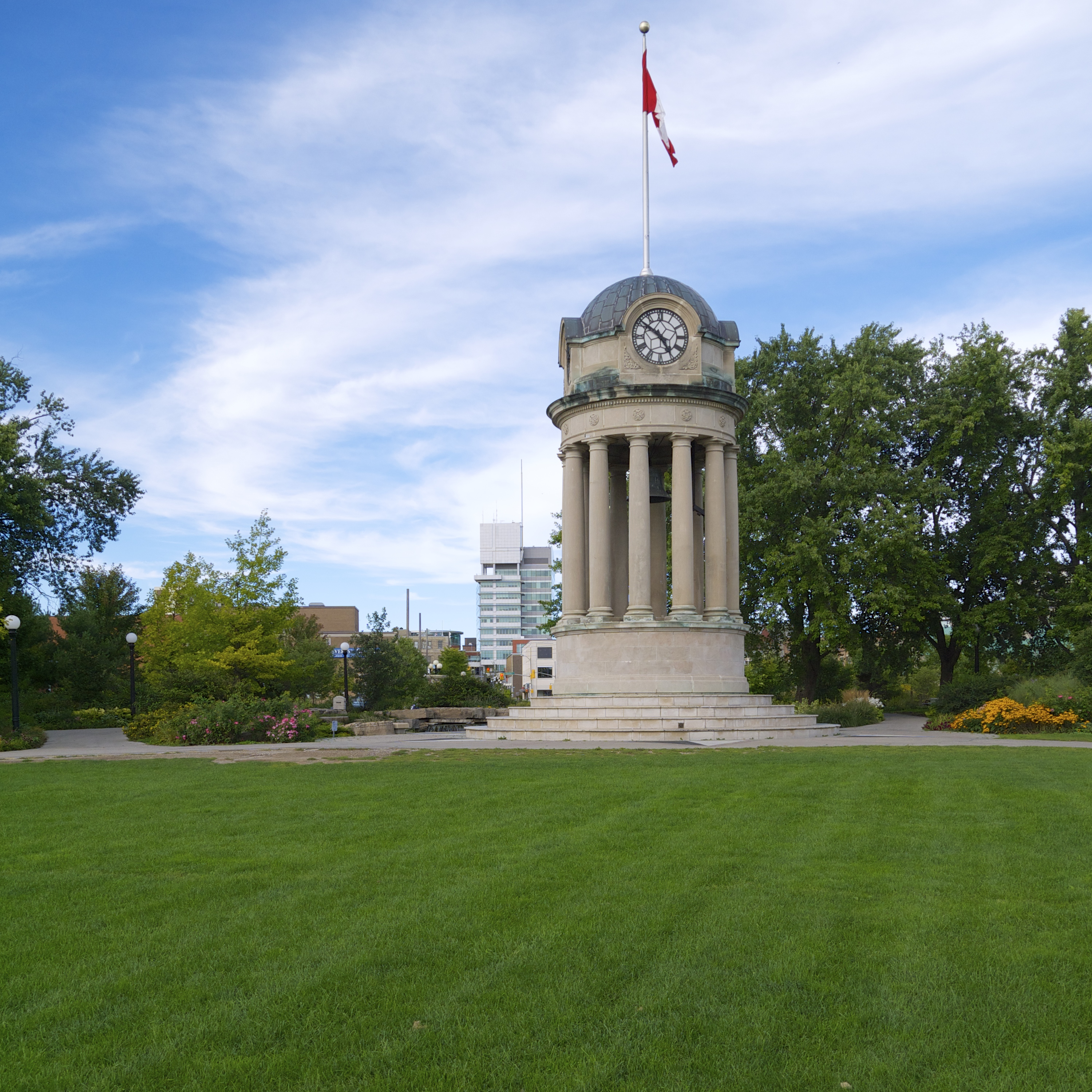
The old City Hall's clock tower now stands in Victoria Park. The current City Hall building is visible in the background.

The clock tower of the 1924 city hall was finally reassembled 22 years after being dismantled, and placed on a new base in Victoria Park in view of the new city hall, in 1995.

== Current building ==
In the 1990s, during the mayoral term of Dom Cardillo, the city decided that it should operate from a dedicated, modern building again. It purchased the complete block enclosed by King, College, Duke, and Young streets, and held an architectural competition to design the building. The winner was Toronto architects Kuwabara Payne McKenna Blumberg Architects (Mertins & Wright, 1990) who laid out an open square facing King Street complete with a fountain/skating rink. The design plans for the building are kept at the Canadian Centre for Architecture in Montreal. The Kitchener City Hall is enclosed on two sides by three-storey wings, with the main building at the back of the square. The west side of the edifice houses the council chamber; a central, open rotunda defines an indoor public space, and the east elevation consists of a twelve-storey office tower.

The parts of the building are named for former names of Kitchener; the wings surrounding the square are named for Sandhills and Ebytown, while the Berlin Tower carries the most recent of the former names. The square at front was simply named Civic Square for its first 21 years; it was renamed Carl Zehr Square in late 2014, in honour of the mayor who retired that year. Gardens and other open space face Duke Street at the rear. The new City Hall opened with generally enthusiastic support in 1993.

The textures of the building are varied. Much of both the interior and exterior is in red sandstone imported from India; domestic granite makes up pavement and floors. A unique feature is the 'green wall'; passing from the south on a parallel with Gaukel Street, this bulwark of green stone continues, at various heights, through the square and building across the entire block. The council chamber is a modern, approachable space, where the mayor and councillors sit at a circular furnishing, surrounded by staff facilities and observed by the visitors' gallery. The building's rotunda hosts many events, from art exhibits to public gatherings.

== Popular culture ==
The city hall makes appearances in the sitcom Dan for Mayor as the Wessex City Hall. It was also featured in the music video for Hemorrhage (In My Hands) by Fuel.

== Cenotaph ==
A cenotaph was built at Frederick Street near King Street in 1929, relocated near City Hall in 1949 and relocated to current site at Duke and Frederick Streets in 1973.

== Sources ==
- City of Kitchener - historic attractions
