= Market Square Shopping Centre (Kitchener) =

Former mall in Kitchener, Ontario

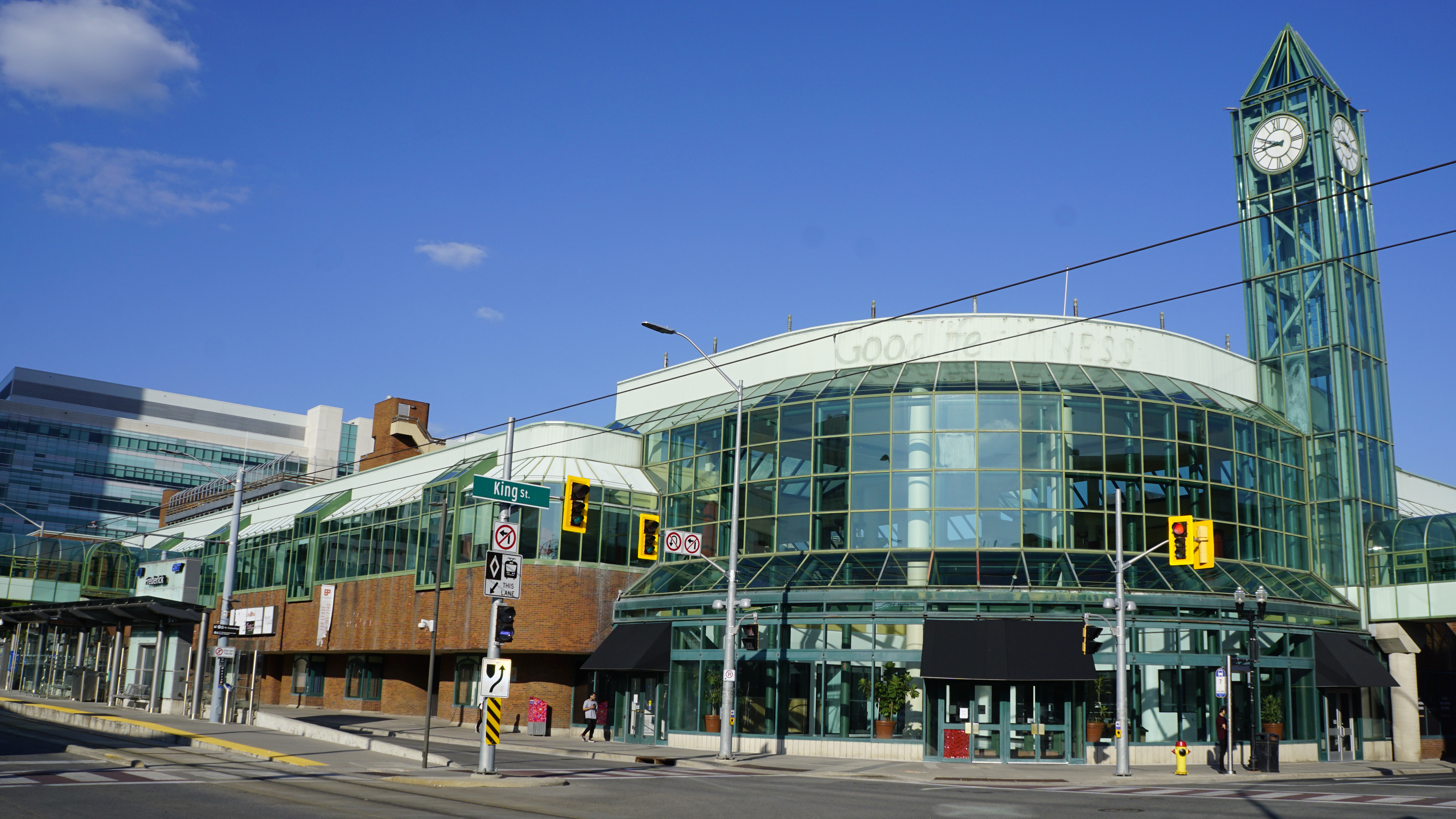
- Market Square Shopping Centre in 2023
- Coordinates: 43°26′57.1″N 80°29′12.3″W
- Address: 25 Frederick Street; Kitchener, Ontario; N2H 6M8
- Opened: 1973
- Num. of stores: 0 (16 retail spaces mostly vacant or repurposed)
- Num. of anchor tenants: 1
- Floor area: Over 22,421.3 m^{2} (241,341 sq ft) - mixed retail, office space
- Floors: 2 (4 with non-retail areas)
- Website: europro.ca/property/market-square (Leasing site for Europro)

Market Square Shopping Centre is a mall located in the downtown core of Kitchener, Ontario, Canada, and is now empty.

== History ==
Built between 1971 and 1973 on the grounds of the original Kitchener City Hall in Kitchener, Ontario, Canada. It was home to an Eaton's (opened in 1973 and later became a Sears Canada retail store), and home to the Kitchener Farmer's Market from 1973 to 2004. Eaton's closed on June 30, 1997, one of the company's first locations to shut down following its restructuring announcement.

A glass clock tower at the corner of King and Frederick Streets pays homage to the former city hall clock tower, which is now located at Victoria Park, Kitchener.

== Decline ==
The mall has since declined, through the 1990s (with a half empty food court with long time McDonald's leaving in 2015) as shoppers have fled to larger malls in Regional Municipality of Waterloo like Conestoga Mall in Waterloo or Fairview Park Mall or Cambridge Centre to the south.

In January 2020, Conestoga College opened an 7,600-square-metre (82,000 sq ft) campus in the building, occupying about 1/3 of the centre's space. The other major tenants were triOS College and The Record, the latter of which occupied a former Sears Outlet store. Few retail stores remain in the mall, which is now primarily used as office space. Nordia Inc. operated a call centre on the uppermost floor of the former Eaton's until 2019. triOS and the Record departed in the following years.

The mall has a multi-level indoor parking along Duke Street and a walkway across to Oxlea Tower (22 Frederick Street), a large office tower across Frederick Street.

The mall is now owned by Europro Real Estate, which owns a number of buildings in the city's core.

== Tenants ==
- Conestoga College, campus for International Business, closed in 2025.

== Transit connections ==
Grand River Transit has a number of routes that have stops around the complex:

Bus Routes

- Route 1 Queen–River via stop on Frederick Street
- Route 3 Ottawa South via stop on Frederick Street
- Route 4 Glasgow via stop on Frederick Street
- Route 7 King via stops on King Street
- Route 204 iXpress Highland–Victoria via stops on Frederick Street

Light Rail

- ION light rail 301 at Frederick station
