= Walter MacNutt =

Canadian organist, choir director and composer

Walter Louis MacNutt (2 June 1910 – 10 August 1996) was a Canadian organist, choir director, and composer. His compositional output includes numerous choral works, songs, pieces for solo organ, and works for orchestra, many of which have been published by companies like Broadcast Music Incorporated, Frederick Harris Music, the Waterloo Music Company, and the Western Music Company. In 1938 his Suite for Piano was awarded the first Vogt Society prize for Canadian composition. One of his more popular works, the secular song Take Me to a Green Isle, is taken from a poem by H.E. Foster. He also composed many songs to the poems of William Blake. In his later years, he composed music mainly for the Anglican church, include two Missae breves and the Mass of St James (1974).

== Life and career ==
Born in Charlottetown, MacNutt began his music studies with W.E. Fletcher and Roberta Spencer Full on Prince Edward Island. In 1929 he entered the Toronto Conservatory of Music (TCM) where he studied through 1932 with Reginald Godden (piano) and Healey Willan (organ and composition). He notably won the TCM's Vogt Memorial and Marion Ferguson scholarships and won a national competition in 1931.

In 1931 MacNutt became organist-choirmaster at Trinity Church in Barrie, Ontario, a post he held through 1935. He then worked in the same capacity at the Church of the Holy Trinity in Toronto from 1935 to 1942. From 1942 to 1946 he served in the Canadian Army where he was stationed on Prince Edward Island. During that time he played saxophone in a regimental band and was the organist at St. Peter's Pro-Cathedral in his native city.

After World War II, MacNutt was the organist-choirmaster at All Saints' Anglican Church, Winnipeg, Manitoba from 1946 to 1949. He worked in the same capacity at All Saints' Church, Windsor, Ontario from 1949 to 1953 where he notably conducted several performances of the Windsor Singers for CBC Radio. He then became organist-choirmaster at St. Thomas's Anglican Church in Toronto in 1954, holding that post until his retirement in 1977. He lived the rest of his life in Toronto where he died in 1996 at the age of 86.
