= Waterloo Music Company =

The Waterloo Music Company was a Canadian music publishing and musical instrument retailing firm that was founded in 1921 by Charles F. Thiele in Waterloo, Ontario. For more than eight decades, the company published works by a large number of notable Canadian composers, including compositions by Violet Archer, John Beckwith, Keith Bissell, Jean Coulthard, Samuel Dolin, Robert Fleming, Arthur Wellesley Hughes, Dr Walter H Kemp, Talivaldis Kenins, Walter MacNutt, Stephen Michell, Barbara Pentland, Godfrey Ridout, Jeannine Vanier, Eric Wild, and Healey Willan. In 2004 the company was acquired by St. John's Music.
