= Laurier–Waterloo Park station =

Light rail station in Waterloo, Ontario

Laurier–Waterloo Park
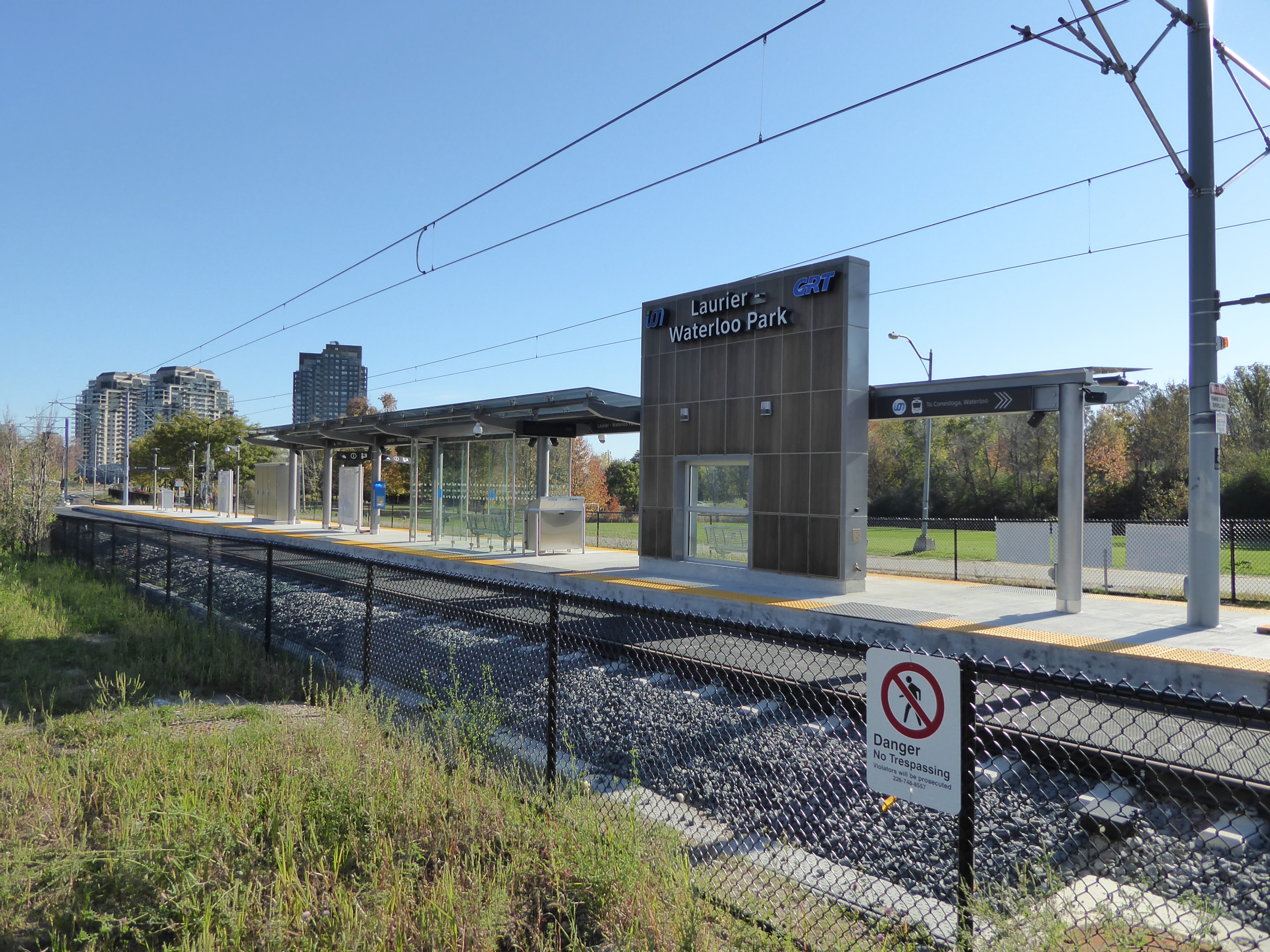
- Station structurally complete, October 2017

General information
- Location: Waterloo, Ontario; Canada
- Coordinates: 43.46899°N 80.53450°W
- Platforms: Centre platform
- Tracks: 2
- Connections: Laurel Trail / Trans Canada Trail

Construction
- Accessible: Yes

Other information
- Status: Complete

History
- Opened: June 21, 2019

Services
Preceding station	Grand River Transit	Following station
University of Waterloo toward Conestoga	Ion	Waterloo Public Square One-way operation
University of Waterloo toward Conestoga	Ion	Willis Way toward Fairway
Location

Laurier–Waterloo Park is a stop on the Region of Waterloo's Ion rapid transit system. It is located on Seagram Drive at the Waterloo Spur rail corridor, just inside Waterloo Park. It is the closest station to its namesake, Wilfrid Laurier University, whose main campus is about 500 metres (1,600 ft) east of the station.

Access to the platform is from both ends: from the north, directly from the Seagram Drive sidewalk; to the south, access to paths within the Park are available on either side of the tracks.

The station's feature wall consists of brown stone tiles with vertical striations.

The southbound track is also used by freight trains on the Waterloo Spur line, which serves industrial locations in Elmira. These trains only run in the overnight hours after LRT service has halted. To protect the station structure (and the trains themselves), a gauntlet track is in place alongside this station that offsets the freight track a small distance.

In addition to the park, nearby locations include University Stadium and the University of Waterloo's UW Place residences.
