= Renée Morisset =

- Born: June 13, 1928; St-Damien-de-Bellechasse, near Quebec City, Quebec
- Died: May 3, 2009 (aged 80), Quebec City
- Genres: classical music
- Instrument: Piano
- Years active: 1952—2003

Renée Morisset, OC CQ (June 13, 1928 – May 3, 2009) was a Canadian pianist. She and her husband, Victor Bouchard, were one of the foremost piano duos in Canadian classical music.

== Honours ==
Morisset was a pupil of Georges-Émile Tanguay. In 1964, she and her husband were awarded the Prix Calixa-Lavallée. In 1981, she and her husband were made Members of the Order of Canada in recognition of having "contributed to" Canada's "musical life by attracting attention to the works of Canadian composers - works that were composed especially for them - and through their participation in various cultural organizations". In 1985, they were promoted to Officers. In 1994, they were made Knights of the National Order of Quebec.
