= Waterloo Park =

Urban park in Waterloo, Ontario

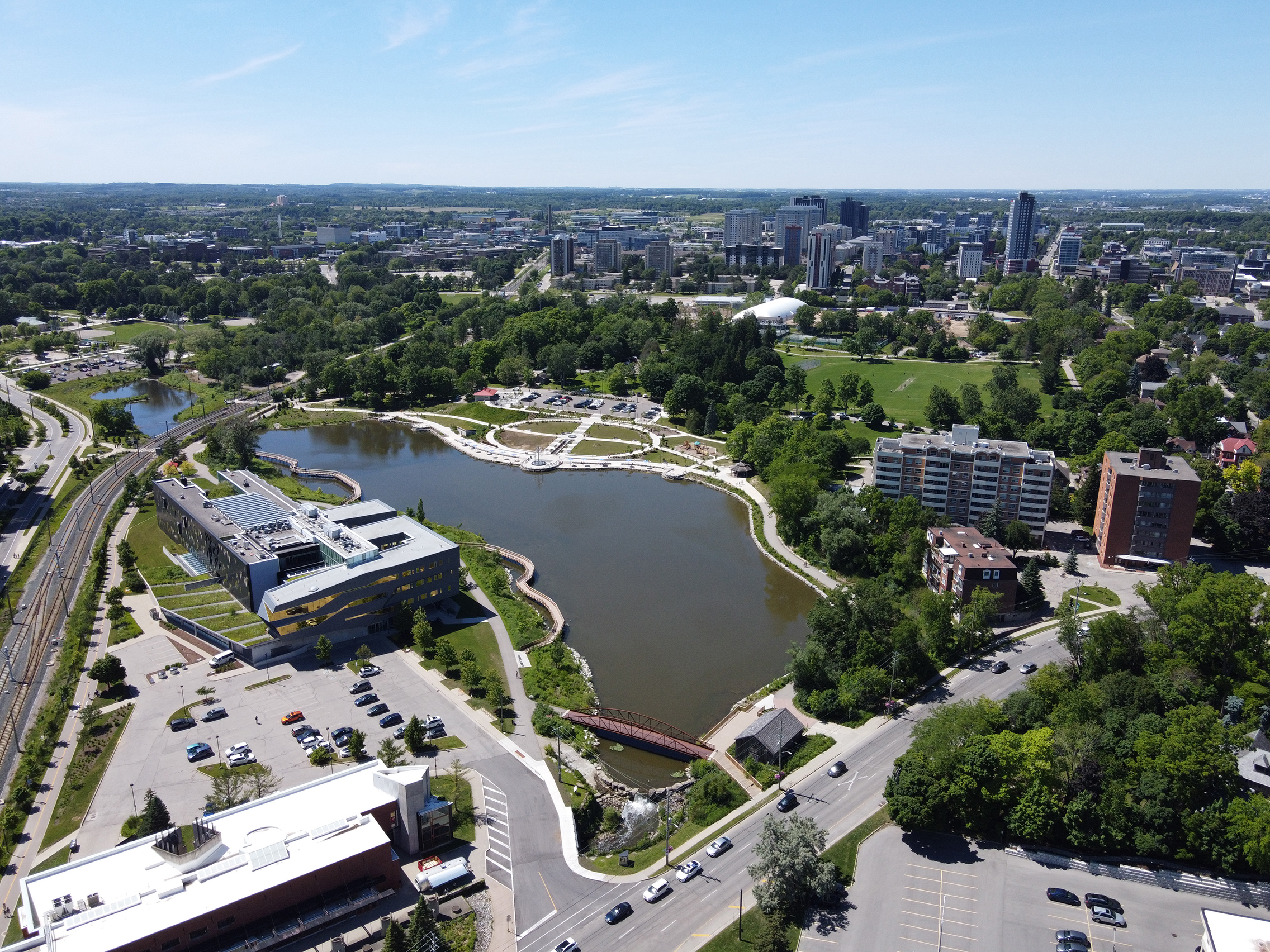
- Aerial view of Waterloo Park in 2024
- Interactive map of Waterloo Park
- Location: Waterloo, Ontario
- Coordinates: 43.467°N 80.533°W
- Area: 44.9 hectares (111 acres)
- Opened: 1893
- Hiking trails: Laurel Trail, Trans Canada Trail
- Public transit: Laurier–Waterloo Park station
- Website: https://www.waterloo.ca/en/things-to-do/waterloo-park.aspx

Waterloo Park is an urban park situated in Waterloo, Ontario, Canada on land within Block 2 of the Haldimand Tract. Spanning 44.9 hectares (111 acres) within the Uptown area of Waterloo, it opened in 1893 and is the oldest park in the city. Managed by the City of Waterloo, the park contains numerous recreational amenities including athletic fields, baseball diamonds, playgrounds, a skateboard park, and the Laurel and Trans Canada trails.

Also situated in the park are a refreshment stand called the Park Inn, the oldest log school house in the Region of Waterloo, the Eby Farmstead and Jacob Eby's farmhouse, which has been occupied by the Waterloo Potters' Workshop since 1967. Silver Lake, an artificial body of water created in 1816 following the damming of the Laurel Creek by Abraham Erb to power a grist mill, sits at the south end of the park. Beyond recreational and educational amenities, Waterloo Park is home to the Waterloo Tennis Club and the Laurier–Waterloo Park station (part of the Ion rapid transit system); the Perimeter Institute and the Canadian Clay and Glass Gallery sit at the south end of the park, along Silver Lake.

== History ==
Waterloo Park officially opened on August 7, 1893, then called West Side Park, following the purchase of Jacob Eby's 25 hectare farm in 1890. Situated on a slope near Silver Lake, the land was acquired from Eby's widow the Village of Waterloo for $74/acre. The land included Eby's farmhouse and existing orchards. It was purchased following a review by Waterloo to create more green space for the growing number of residents transitioning from rural to urban living. The committee responsible for the review had considered two additional scenarios: the establishment of a joint park with Berlin, now Kitchener, on the grounds of Mount Hope Cemetery and the development of fairgrounds situated near William and Caroline.

A Board of Park Management initially consisting of Christian Kumpf, Isaac Erb Bowman, William Snider, Dr. J. H. Webb, Walter Wells, and Jacob Conrad was established to oversee the development of the land. The board hired Andrew McIntyre to serve as Waterloo Park's first superintendent. Ten men, with the assistance of two teams of horses, worked for more than three months leveling and filling in land. Old buildings, fences and tree stumps were removed to prepare for the park's opening, preceded by the planting of nearly 2,000 trees to created shaded areas appropriate for walking and picnics. In 1917 the park was expanded by 16 acres, reflecting the growth of the city. It was expanded again in 1958 when 30 acres of land was purchased from Sunbar and Canbar Ltd. and an additional 34 acres were acquired along Westmount Road.

A grandstand, situated between the Eby farmhouse and the cricket pitch, was built in 1895, providing seating for sporting events and concerts. The same year it was the location of the 13th annual Canadian Wheelmen's Association championship races. Hosted by the Waterloo Bicycle Club the Daily Record reported on July 2, 1895, that: "At least 1,500 wheelman and altogether 10,000 people passed through the gates of the Waterloo Park." In 1901 the Victoria Jubilee Gateway was added to the Young Street entrance of the park to commemorate the death of Queen Victoria. Consisting of stone columns and an ornamental lace archway made of iron, it remained in place until 1957 when the archway was removed, followed several years later by the columns, in order to better accommodate increased vehicle traffic. In the early 1990s K-W Ornamental Iron Works Limited was contracted by the city to recreate plans for the gateway using old photographs, and a new version was installed to the west of the original location in 1993. A year later, Lou Bechtloff alerted the city to presence of the original archway and columns on her Paradise Lake property, which had been previously owned by Waterloo's City Hotel owner, Edmund Schmidt. They were purchased for use at another park entrance by city and the Waterloo Local Architectrual Conservation Advisory Committee, along with an original King Street street light and the front canopy of the hotel, as heritage artifacts.

In 1932 the park was the site of the first Waterloo Band Festival. The event took place at a newly constructed bandstand donated for the event by Joseph E. Seagram of Seagram Distilleries. Launched by Waterloo Musical Society director Charles Thiele to mark the Golden Jubilee of the group, the festival continued for several years drawing performers from across North America and gaining international recognition. The festival ran from 1932 to 1940 and 1946 to 1958, going on hiatus during the early 1940s as a result of World War II.

=== 2010s to present ===
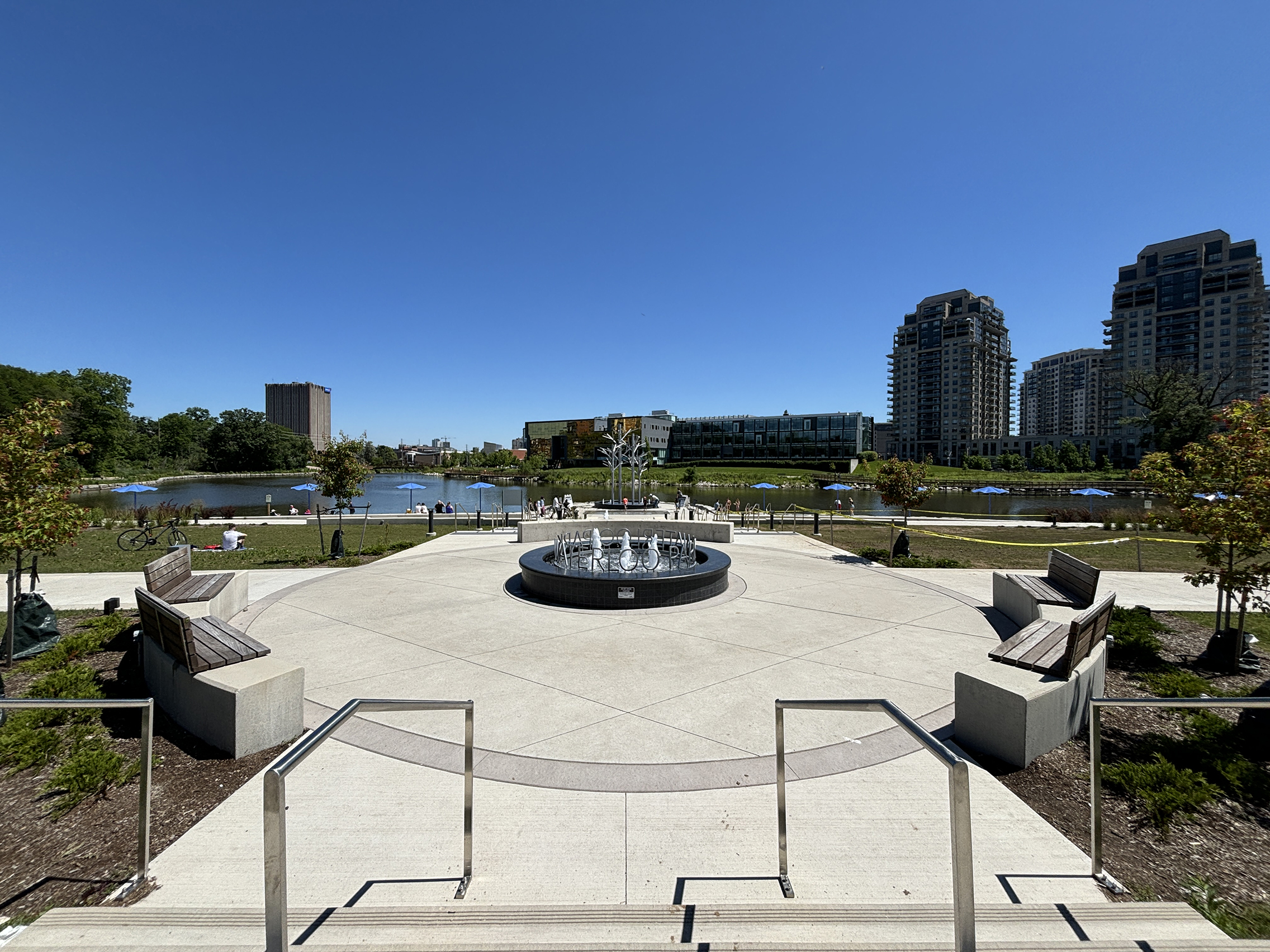
Waterloo Park Fountain area completed in 2022

Waterloo Park has undergone a series of enhancements since the mid-2010s ranging from amenity improvements to transportation upgrades. A skateboard park opened in 2012 along Father David Bauer Drive, followed by a grand entrance across from the Waterloo Memorial Recreation Complex a year later. In 2015 the city approved funding for upgrades to the Park in keeping with recommendations from the Waterloo Park Master Plan. Public consultations were launched in 2016 regarding the redesign of the central promenade from Erb Street West and Caroline Street to Seagram Drive in order to address an influx of pedestrians and cyclists. Budgeted at 1.4 million dollars, the project aimed to introduce wider, paved trails with a dedicated lane for cycling and another for pedestrians, and make improvements to the tree canopy, lighting and light rail transit crossings.

During the summer of 2018 a series of reconstructed and partially separated trails opened, allowing pedestrians and cyclists to travel more safely through the park. The $2.5 million project included the introduction of an additional pedestrian bridge and improved crossings to address concerns about getting from the east to the west side of the park following the introduction of the Ion rapid transit through the park.

The Lions Lagoon splash pad closed after 25 years in the fall of 2019. Plans for the closure were accompanied by funding for new splash pads in parks across the city by 2022, including a smaller one off of Father David Bauer Drive scheduled for the 2020 season.

== Amenities ==
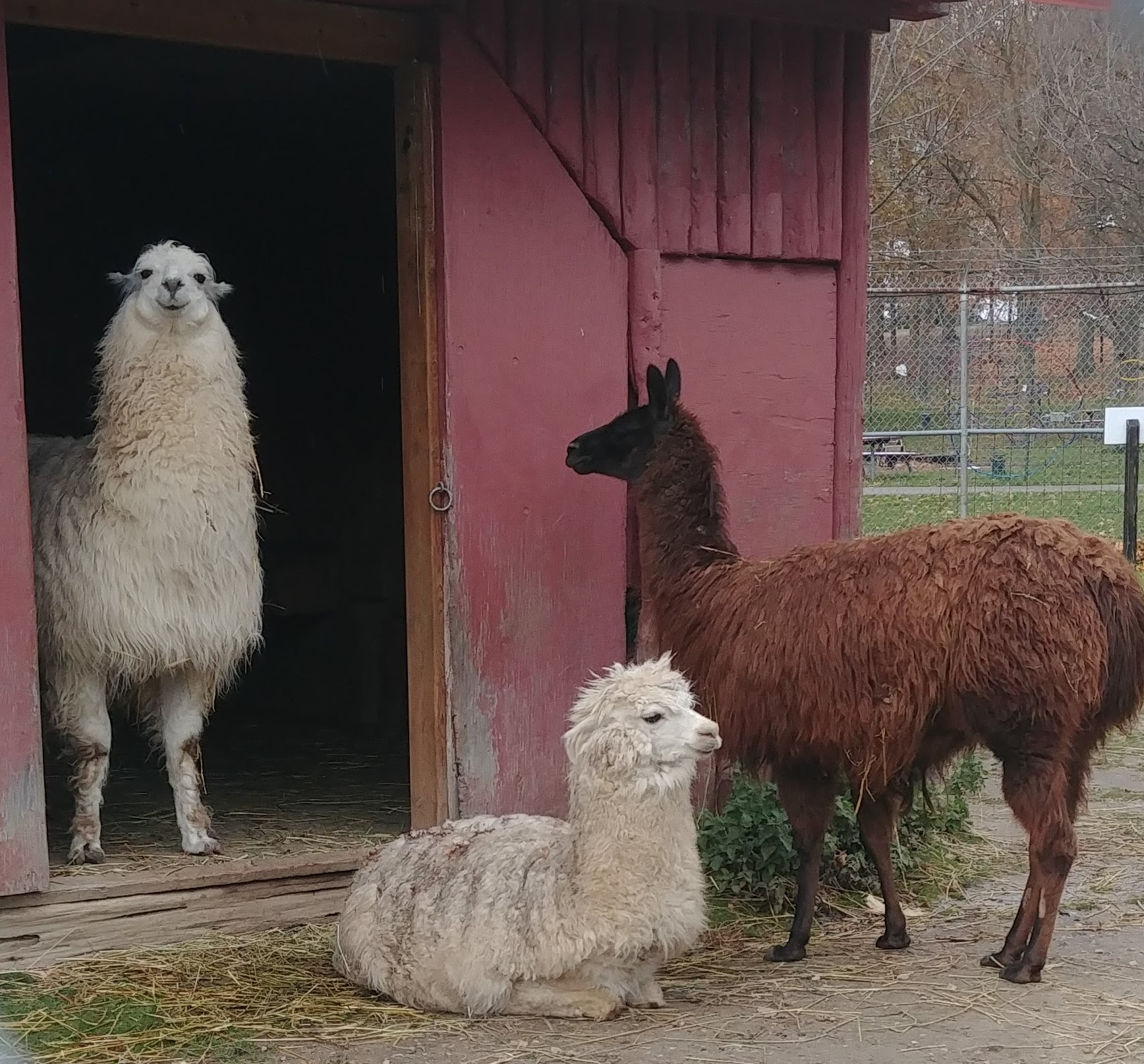
Llamas and alpacas at Eby Farmstead.

Waterloo Park is home to the Waterloo Tennis Club, the Eby Farmstead, a log school house and a replica of Abraham Erb's grist mill, along with multiple baseball diamonds, sports fields and recreation trails. The Park Inn, a refreshment stand located above Silver Lake designed by one time Waterloo city councilor Charlie Voelker, was opened in 1955. The original building was renovated in 2005 to allow for updated electrical service and an expanded refreshments menu. Jacob Eby's farmhouse remains in the park and has been occupied by the Waterloo Potters' Workshop since 1967. In addition to the park attractions, the Waterloo Tennis Club has been operating out of the park since 1915.

The grist mill replica opened June 23, 1998. Since Erb's original mill had been torn down and replaced in 1850, a plan for the replica was based on historical news and photos of Canadian grist mills from the same era. Construction included material from other historical buildings in the region like supporting posts from what had been the Globe Furniture building. The project was later accompanied by a series History Walk at Silver Lake panels. Detailing the role the lake played in Waterloo's industrial history, the four themed panels – Waterloo's Beginnings, Joseph E. Seagram, Recreation in Waterloo and Other Early Industries – were placed at significant points along the south side of the water.

A bandshell built in 1967 to mark the Canadian Centennial is located on the west side of the park next to the Laurel Creek. In 2009 a master plan for the park approved by the city recommended that it be removed due to its condition and the cost of necessary upgrades, including a lack of electricity and a lack of storage or washrooms. The bandshell continues to be used during warmer weather for performances by the Waterloo Concert Band.

Since opening, Waterloo Park has been the site of numerous social and cultural events including music festivals, family reunions and athletic competitions. The Wonders of Winter lights festival has taken place in the park since 1993, attracting roughly 40,000 people to the park over the course of the holiday season. The park has also served as the location of the annual pow wow hosted by the Waterloo Indigenous Student Centre.

=== Eby Farmstead ===
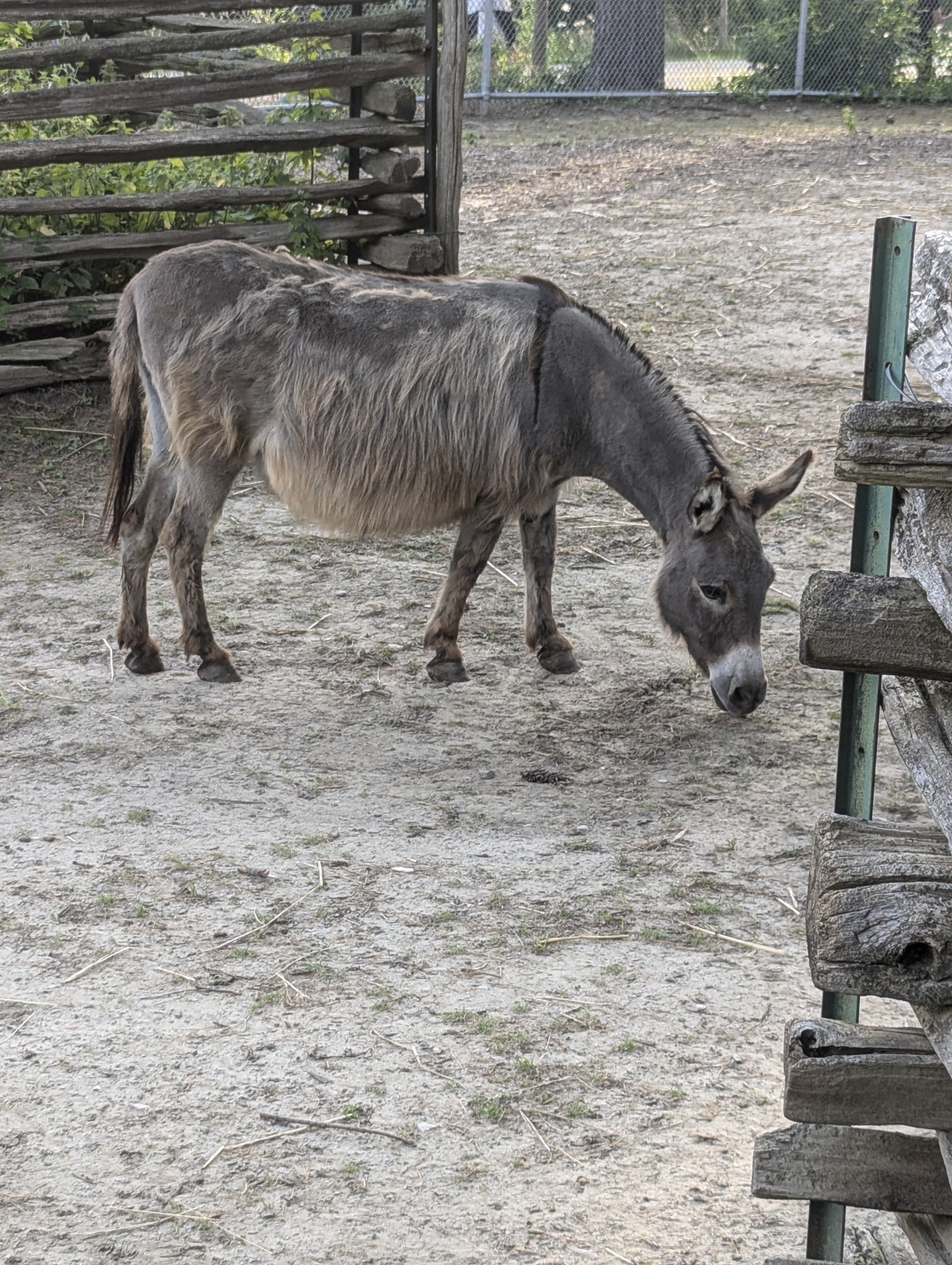
Donkey at Eby Farmstead

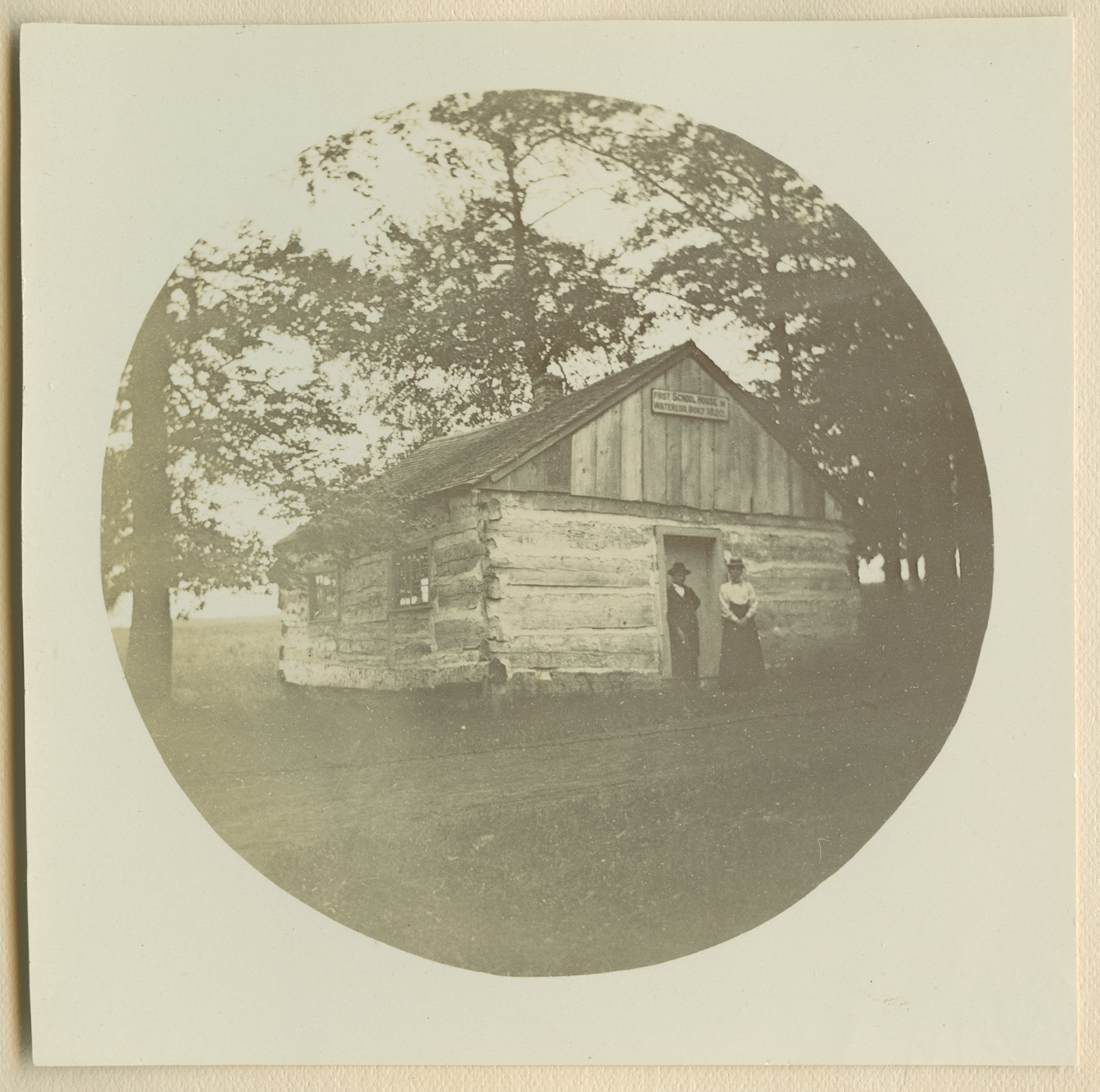
School in 1899 at original location.

Animals were introduced to the park as part of a wildlife zoo in the 1960s as a centennial project gifted to the city by the Waterloo Lions Club. When first opened the zoo housed animals representative of Canadian wildlife including bears, wolves, cougars and, at one point, a moose. The city transitioned to housing domestic animals in 1990, as part of the park's centennial, at which point the zoo was renamed the Eby Farmstead as a nod to the Eby family who sold the original piece of land used to establish the park. The change was precipitated by the frequency of vandalism leading to animals escapes and concerns for the safety of both the animals and the general public.

In operation year-round, the farmstead consists of five enclosures that house miniature horses, donkeys, alpacas, llamas, peacocks, pot-bellied pigs, pygmy goats and varieties of fowl. In 2019 two in-ground waste containers were added to collect animal manure and facilitate its use as compost by local farmers. In 2024 the live animal display had come to an end and the animals in the park has been rehomed.

=== Log school house ===
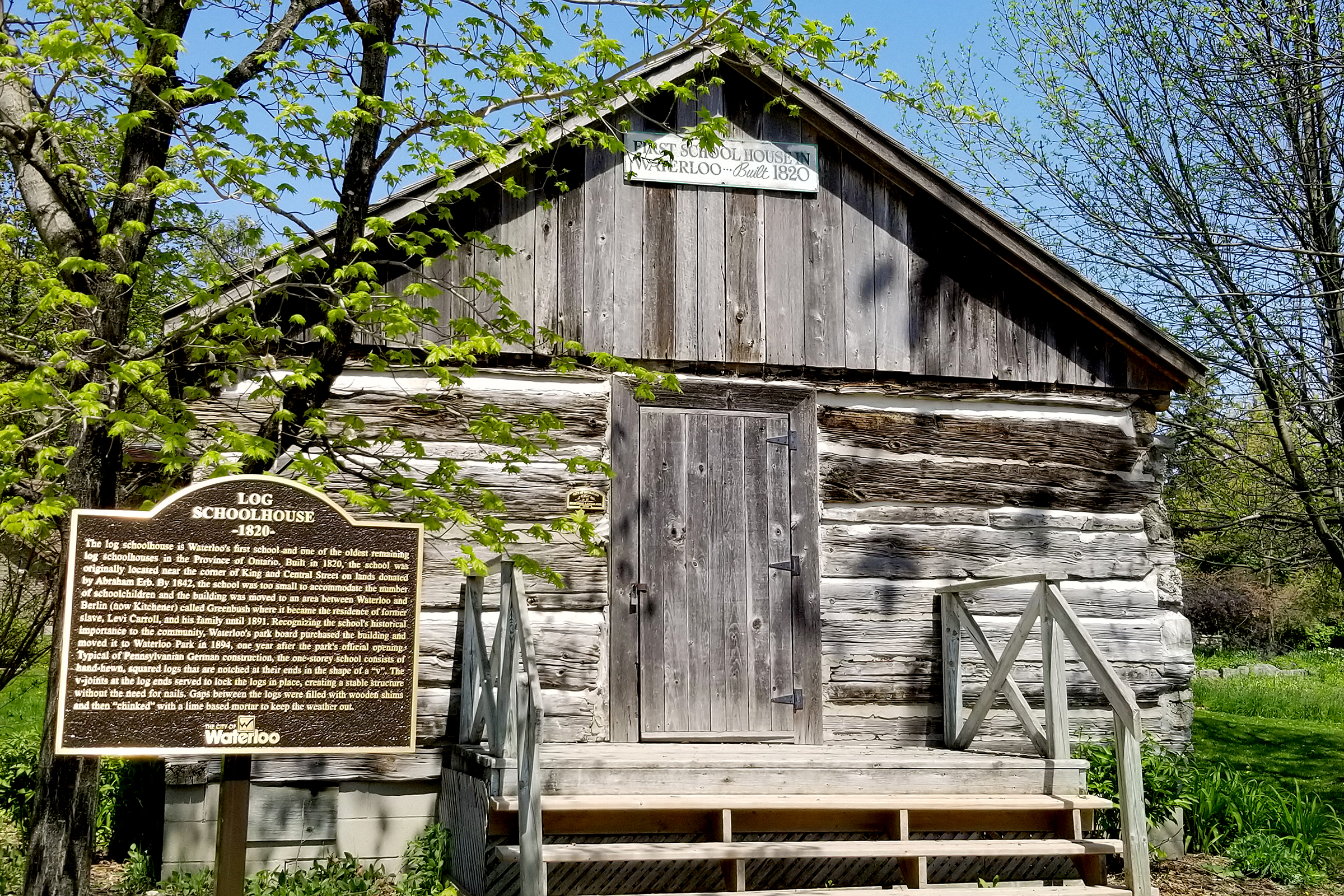
First School in Waterloo, Ontario (1820)

Built in 1820, the log school house was originally located on Church Street near King and was in use for 23 years. (In modern times, the location of the log school is known as Central and King Streets.)

Deemed too small to accommodate a growing number of school aged children, the building was replaced by a stone school and the log school was dismantled. It was relocated to Berlin, near the current location of the Kitchener Collegiate Institute, where it served as the home of the formerly enslaved Levi Carroll, of Maryland, and his family. The Carrolls remained in the home until the early 1890s, at which time Levi was admitted to the House of Industry, and the building stood vacant. MPP Isaac Erb Bowman campaigned to save the building, succeeding in having it purchased by the town of Waterloo and relocated to Waterloo Park.

== Silver Lake ==
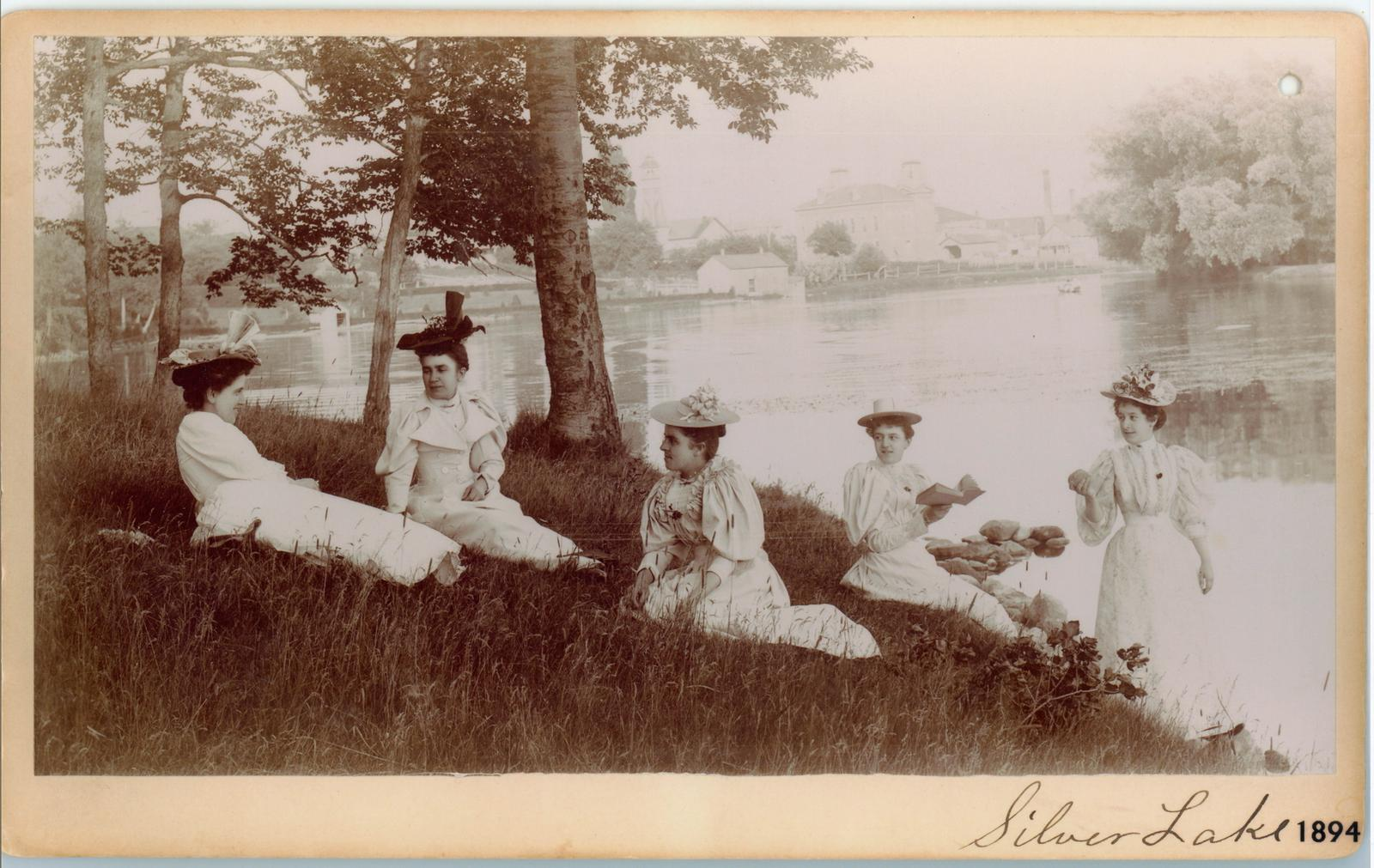
Women sitting under the shade of a tree next to Silver Lake in 1894.

Silver Lake sits to the west of the park, with the Laurel Creek running through it before flowing under the Waterloo Public Square. The lake was not part of the land initially purchased from Jacob Eby's widow although it contributed to the aesthetics of the park. It was instead acquired by the city in 1915 after the death of William Snider, then owner of the grist mill, for $300, at which time it was given the name Silver Lake.

The lake was created in 1816 when the Laurel Creek, then called Beaver Creek, was damned by Abraham Erb. Used as a grist mill pond, its creation slowed the flow of water through the Laurel Creek watershed, causing a buildup of sediment from upstream. The problem was exacerbated in 1895 when local residents successfully petitioned the Grand Trunk Railway to extend the Waterloo line to Elmira. A right of way across the mill pond was purchased from William Snider, decreasing the size of the lake and increasing the presence of sediment deposits.

In 1994 Waterloo city council approved the undertaking of $100,000 environmental assessment of the lake by the Grand River Conservation Authority. At the time the lake it was referred to by locals as Mud Lake due to a widespread sediment build up and was viewed as a flood risk. Councillor Tricia Siemens was quoted in The Record as saying: "The flood control area is ancient. There could be billions of dollars in property damage if there's a major flood. We could be heading for a disaster." The need for a rehabilitation plan was further underscored in August 1995 when several hundred waterfowl, predominantly ducks, died from botulism, the result of extreme temperatures and excrement build up in the shallow, sediment clogged lake.

Waterloo settled on a seven-year plan to restore the lake following a two-hour council discussion about costs and timelines in November 1995. The plan included the dredging of the lake and the introduction of a cascading outlet, along with new walking amenities and general environmental improvements By 1997 plans were underway to rehabilitate the area including the creation of wetland and wildlife habitats and the rehabilitation of mudflats. A boardwalk, gazebos and lighting along walkways were introduced along the lake in 2000.

Redevelopment of Silver Lake and the surrounding area were announced in September 2019, with $9 million budgeted to introduce a new promenade and boardwalk, as well as reshape and in some cases naturalize areas around the Lake and the Laurel Creek. The project will include land vacated by the 2019 closure of the Lions Lagoon splash pad.

== Land and location ==
Waterloo Park is located on land that was initially part of Waterloo Township, one of the five townships within Waterloo Country, and is today known as Waterloo, Ontario. It is situated on land historically referred to as Block 2 of the Haldimand Tract, land granted to the Haudenosaunee Six Nations (Iroquois) who had served on the British side during the American Revolution as part of the Haldimand Proclamation. The Block 2 land was purchased by Richard Beasley from the Six Nations of the Grand River via Joseph Brant in 1796. Financial difficulties led to Beasley selling 60,000-acre tract of land to the German Company of Pennsylvania in 1803, which led to the eventual founding of Waterloo by Abraham Erb. As of 2019, the park sits on 111 acres of land in Uptown Waterloo, bordered by Seagram Drive and University Avenue to the north, Albert Street and Caroline to the east, Erb Street and Father David Bauer Drive to the south and Westmount Road North to the west. The Perimeter Institute and the Canadian Clay and Glass Gallery sit at the south end of the park. Although the park can be accessed through a variety of paths and roads, the main entrance is located at 50 Young Street West.
