= Marmaduke Barton =

English pianist, composer and teacher

Marmaduke Barton FRCM (29 December 1865 – 24 July 1938) was an English pianist, composer and teacher at the Royal College of Music for almost 50 years.

== Career ==
Marmaduke Miller Barton was born in Manchester, the son of a United Methodist Free Church minister, the Rev Samuel Saxon Barton. He was educated at the Royal College of Music (RCM) in London under one of the first 50 scholarships. His teachers were John Francis Barnett (piano) and Sir Charles Villiers Stanford.

On 2 July 1884 he opened the very first concert ever given by students of the RCM, in the West Theatre of the Royal Albert Hall, with a performance of Chopin's Ballade No. 3 in A-flat.

He met Hamish MacCunn at this time and the two became lifelong friends. He made piano duet arrangements of two of MacCunn's orchestral works, and some smaller works were dedicated to him. He and MacCunn played piano duets in some student concerts.

Barton was the inaugural winner of the Hopkinson Gold Medal for piano performance at the RCM. He was the soloist at the premiere performance of Charles Wood's Piano Concerto. In 1887 he played before Queen Victoria at Windsor Castle in a concert celebrating her Golden Jubilee. On 20 December 1887, he participated in the first English performance of Palestrina's Stabat Mater, at the Princes' Hall, under Sir Hubert Parry.

In 1888 he was awarded a travelling scholarship, enabling him to study with the Franz Liszt pupil Bernhard Stavenhagen in Weimar. He was appointed to the teaching staff of the RCM on his return in 1889, while continuing his career as a solo performer. In February 1891 he played Brahms' Piano Concerto No. 2 under Sir August Manns at The Crystal Palace, and also appeared at the Albert Hall, the Proms (he played the Schumann Piano Concerto in A minor on 11 October 1911 under Sir Henry Wood), and in the provinces. He gave frequent solo recitals in London, and he toured South Africa and the Netherlands.

Of his playing of the Schumann Piano Concerto in 1910, Ernest Newman wrote:

A more superb performance of Schumann's Concerto it would be hard to imagine. When we get a piece of playing so thoroughly splendid in every quality of technique and brain and temperament, there is no room for any feeling but one of thankfulness.

Barton taught at the Guildhall School of Music from 1911, and regularly acted as Examiner for the Associated Board of the Royal Schools of Music. He published a small number of compositions, including a Mass in A major and some piano pieces. His students included: Marion Scott, Cyril Rootham, Clara Butt, Lloyd Powell, Henry Ley, Audrey Piggott, and the entertainer Anna Russell (presumably no relation to his wife).

== Legacy ==
The Marmaduke Barton Prize for Pianoforte Playing is awarded by the RCM. Recipients include David Helfgott and Marianna Prjevalskaya.

== Personal life ==
In 1891 he married Anna Russell, one of his co-students at the RCM, a pupil of Jenny Lind and Sir George Henschel. She had sung Agathe in the college's production of Der Freischütz. He became a Roman Catholic soon afterwards.

== Death ==
Barton died in 1938, aged 72, survived by his widow, a daughter and three sons. He was buried at St. Mary's Roman Catholic Cemetery, Kensal Green.
