= Françoise Aubut =

Canadian organist

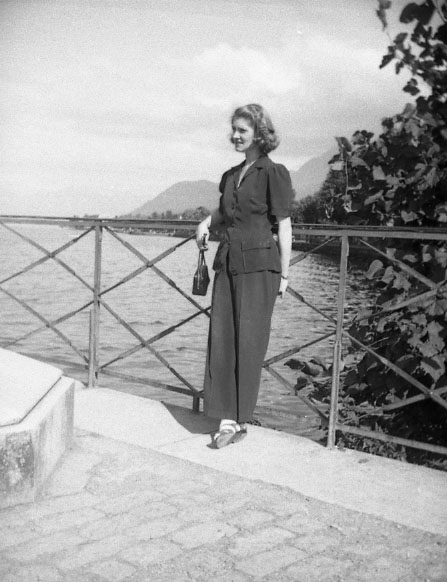
- Aubut, c. 1947
- Born: 5 September 1922; Saint-Jérôme, Quebec, Canada
- Died: 8 October 1984 (aged 62); Montreal, Quebec, Canada
- Education: Conservatoire national de musique New England Conservatory
- Occupations: concert organist music teacher

Françoise Aubut-Pratte, née Aubut (5 September 1922 – 8 October 1984) was a Canadian concert organist, and music teacher.

== Life ==
Born in Saint-Jérôme (Quebec), a great-granddaughter of Calixa Lavallée, she began her piano studies at the age of six. At the Conservatoire national de musique of Montreal, she studied organ with Eugène Lapierre, harmony and piano with Antonio Létourneau.

She continued her studies at the New England Conservatory of Boston under the direction of Carl McKinley (organ), Jesús María Sanroma (piano) and Marian Mason (harmony), and won a "Soloist Diploma" in 1938.

In the fall of 1938, she moved to Paris where she worked at the Conservatoire de Paris with Olivier Messiaen (musical analysis), Marcel Dupré (organ and improvisation), Simone Plé-Caussade (counterpoint and fugue), Norbert Dufourcq (music history), and Henri Büsser (musical composition). At the École normale de musique de Paris, she worked on musical writing with Nadia Boulanger and piano with Alfred Cortot.

Despite the deprivations of the war, the German occupation and an eight-month internment in Besançon, she won an exceptional Grand Premier Prix at the age of 21, crowning all the courses followed at the Paris Conservatory in 1944. This was the first time that a North American citizen had received this honour.

She taught organ and fugue at the Faculty of Music of the Université de Montréal from 1951 and gave organ lessons at the École de musique Vincent-d'Indy from 1967. Among her students were Françoys Bernier, Victor Bouchard, Marthe Lesage, Denis Regnaud, Jeannine Vanier, and Christopher Jackson.

She was a member of the jury for the 1956 Prix d'Europe competition and the 1962 and 1978 Conservatoire de Paris exams.

Françoise Aubut died in Montreal at age 62. She was entombed at the Notre Dame des Neiges Cemetery in Montreal.

== Recordings ==
- 3rd Choral by Franck, Pange lingua, Ave Maris Stella and Symphonie-Passion by Dupré, (RCI 122), 1956.
- Psaume CL by Jean Papineau-Couture avec la Chorale Bach de Montréal. (RCI 128 et 6-ACM 4) 1956.
