= Charles Thiele =

Charles F. Thiele
- Born: November 17, 1884; New York City
- Died: February 3, 1954 (aged 69) Kitchener, Ontario
- Occupations: Bandleader, Industrialist
- Instrument: Coronet
- Formerly of: Waterloo Musical Society Band

Charles Frederick Thiele (November 17, 1884 - February 3, 1954) was an American-Canadian bandmaster, musician and industrialist. He founded Waterloo Metal Stampings, the first company to manufacture music stands in Canada. Thiele also established the Waterloo Music Company, which produced sheet music used by bands across Canada. Actively involved in the local and national music community, Thiele was a founding member of the Ontario Amateur Bands Association and the Canadian Band Association, and was the driving force behind the nationally recognized Waterloo Band Festival.

== Biography ==
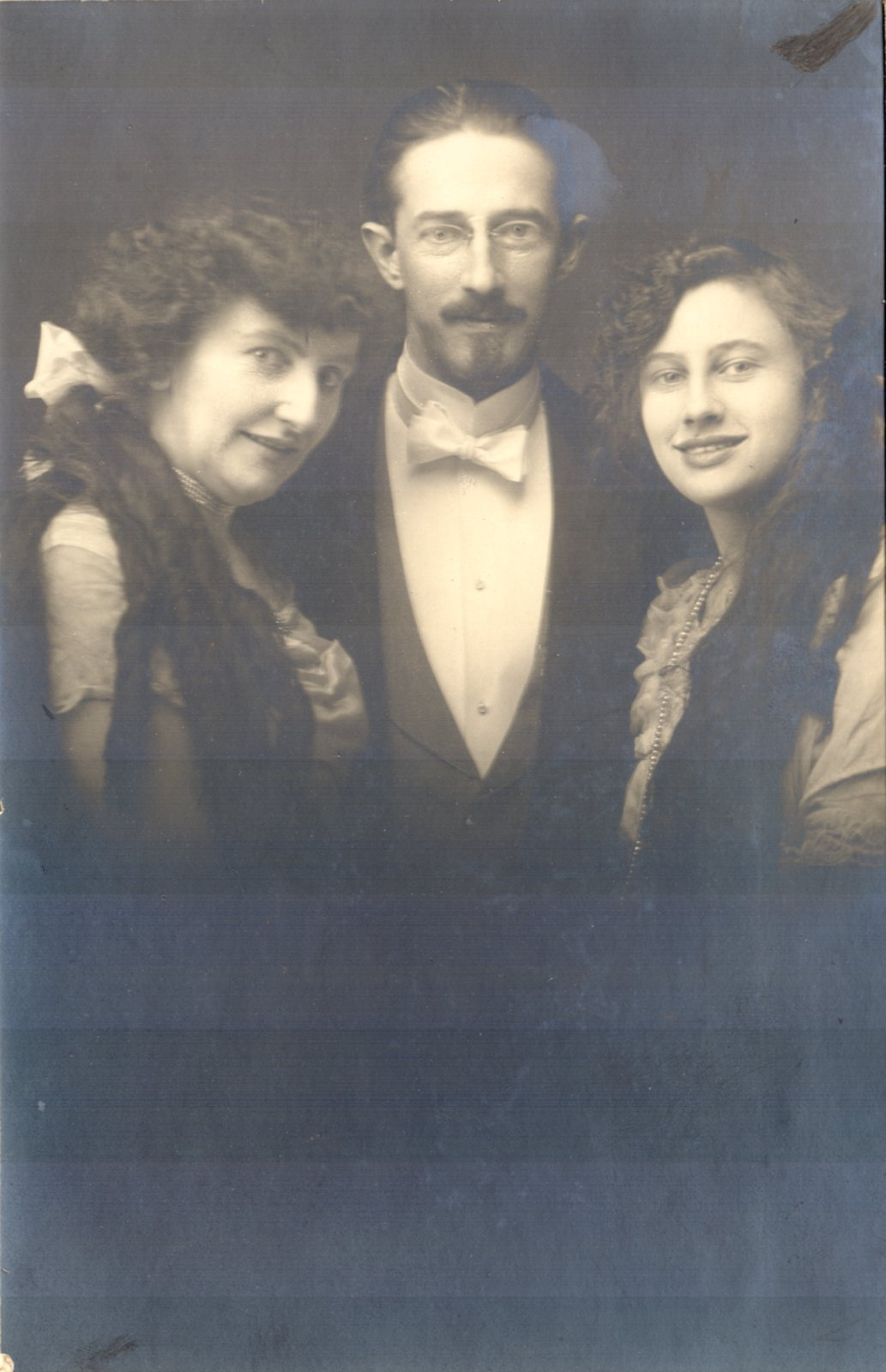
Thiele with wife Louise (left) and daughter Carolyn (right).

Thiele was born on November 17, 1884, in New York City. He was the son of third-generation German-American Elizabeth Kernig, who supported the family as a chef, and Helmut Thiele, a newly landed German immigrant. Thiele married his wife, Louise Freeman, at the age of 19. Their daughter, Carolyn, was born the following year in 1904.

A trained, solo cornetist, Thiele performed with and directed several American bands. He founded his own band, the Thiele Concert Party, which featured his wife, who also played the cornet, and their daughter who played the saxophone. Louise and Carolyn also performed as part of circuit Chautauquas throughout the United States in order to supplement Thiele's income while he headed the Rumford, Maine city band as musical director.

=== Life in Waterloo ===
The Thiele family moved to Waterloo, Ontario, in 1919 after Thiele accepted a position as the director of the Waterloo Musical Society Band. He'd seen an advertisement for job in Billboard magazine and was hired on a trial basis. They moved to the region, in part, because of anti-German sentiment in the United States following World War I.

While living in Waterloo Thiele founded two companies - Waterloo Metal Stampings and the Waterloo Music Company - employing as many as 150 employees at the height of their operation. Waterloo Metal Stampings began after Thiele took over a section of an industrial plant in Waterloo. Waterloo Metal Stampings produced a variety of music-based items including music stands, drums and cymbals, eventually introducing the production of office furniture. When it was founded in 1922, Waterloo Music Company sold and produced music for pianists working in silent film houses, later selling sheet music used by bands across the country. Thiele started the business in his home, relocating to an office after outgrowing the space. The company went on to sell and repair musical instruments, as well as offer music lessons and educational resources. The Waterloo Music Company operated for the majority of its time at 3 Regina Street North in Waterloo. The business was relocated to the Tannery building at Joseph and Victoria streets in Kitchener, Ontario, in 2011. The business was purchased by St. John's Music in 2004, who dropped the original name after the moving the business to Kitchener. The location closed after 92 years in operation in 2014.

In 1924 Thiele founded the Ontario Bandsmen's Association, today the Ontario Amateur Bands Association, which oversaw band competitions at the Canadian National Exhibition. He served as president until 1948. Thiele was also a founding member of the Canadian Bandmasters' Association, established in 1931, serving as president from 1934 to 1935. The association, which evolved into the Canadian Band Association, held an annual Bandmasters' Instrumental Clinic in Waterloo aimed at improving the quality of band music across the country. Run at Thiele's expense, the events hosted international artists and attracted attendees from across North America.

In addition to his band association work, Thiele served as the editor of Musical Canada from 1928 to 1933. Founded in 1906 by Edwin Parkhurst as The Violin, the monthly publication was a journal dedicated to musical themed news and commentary. Under Thiele's direction the journal's office was relocated to Waterloo from Toronto and began featuring sheet music copyrighted by the Waterloo Music Company. The final issue of the journal was released in February 1933.

In 1944 Thiele played a role in founding the Kitchener-Waterloo Symphony Orchestra, along with conductor Glenn Kruspe and percussionist Archie Bernhardt. Two years later Thiele started the Waterloo Music Camp for Boys, known as 'Bandberg', in nearby Bamberg, Ontario. Situated on 65 acres of land Thiele purchased in 1944, the camp was situated 12 miles west of Waterloo on the site of a sawmill that had been established in 1838. Concerned about the lack of instructional opportunities in small towns, Thiele's vision was to provide professional instruction to musically inclined boys who may otherwise have no access to musical training. The camp was dedicated to the memory of Canadian bandsmen who had fought and lost their lives during World War I and II.

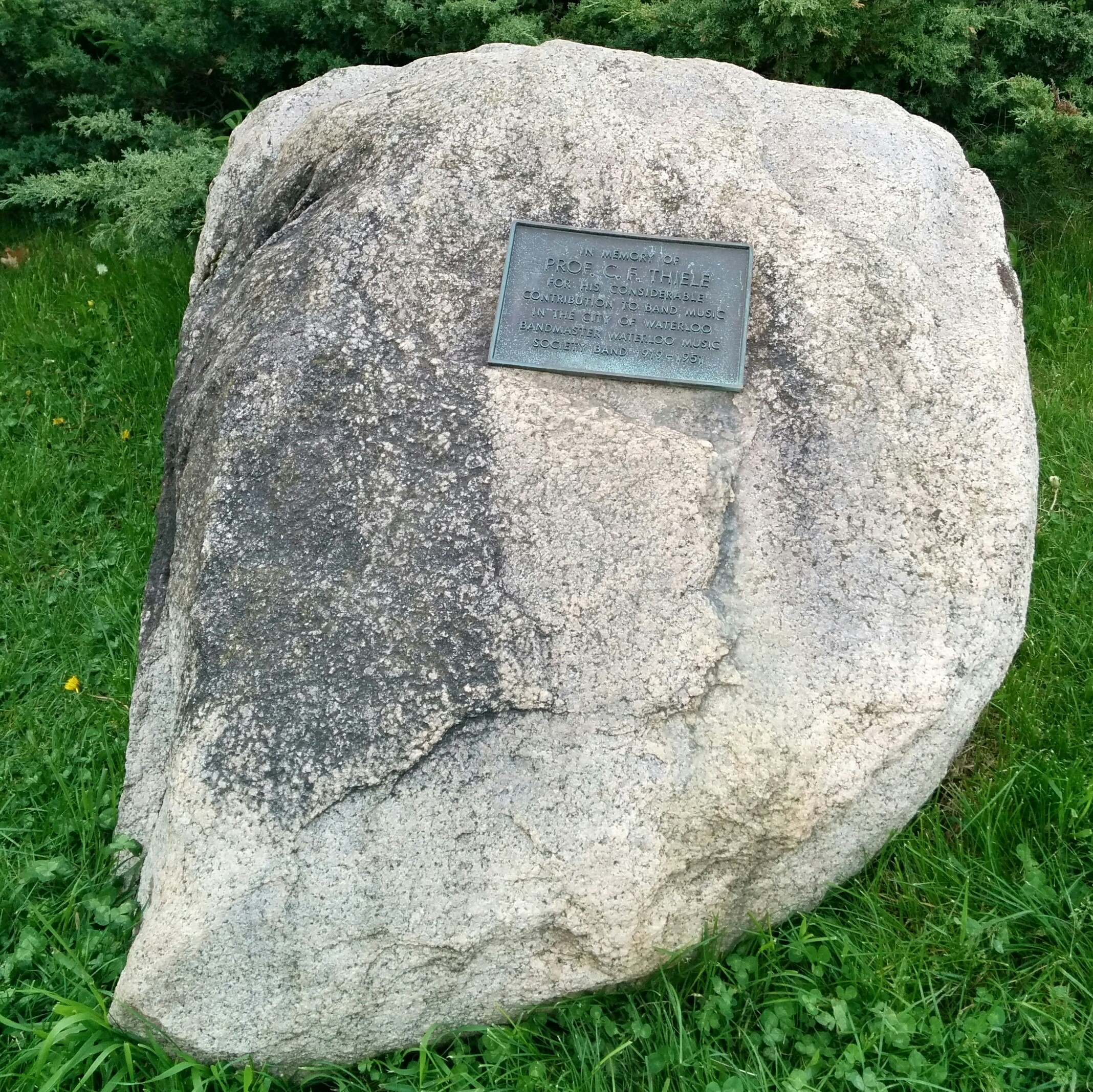
Memorial for Charles F. Thiele in Waterloo Park.

== Waterloo Band Festival ==
Thiele started the Waterloo Band Festival in 1932. What would become an annual festival, was the result of a commemorative event to mark the Golden Jubilee of the Waterloo Musical Society. It was held in Waterloo Park making use of a bandstand donated by Joseph E. Seagram of Seagram Distilleries. It was one of only two bandstands in Ontario. The event featured fifteen bands and 80 solo performers making it, at the time, the largest music festival in the country. The festival ran from 1932–40 and 1946–58, going on hiatus during the early 1940s as a result of World War II.

The festival was so popular that in 1950 Toronto Star journalist Augustus Bridle noted that it had made Waterloo "far more famous than "Berlin" used to be before W.W.I made the town Kitchener." By 1953 the festival featured 60 bands and attracted more than 1,000 solo entries. Bands and solo performers from across Canada and the northern United States played over the course of the festival's run including Boston cornetist Walter Smith, New York saxophonist Sigmund Rascher and NBC Symphony Orchestra tuba player William Bell.

== Death ==
Thiele died on February 3, 1954, at the Kitchener-Waterloo Hospital after being sick for most of the previous year. A funeral for Thiele was held on February 6, 1954, at St. Andrew's Presbyterian Church in Kitchener with an address given by Reverend J.G. Mudock. Bands people from across Ontario and Quebec were in attendance and the Royal Canadian Air Force Training Command Band, Toronto performed following the service. He was entombed at the Woodland Cemetery Mausoleum.

Following Thiele's death his personal library of band music was left to the Waterloo Musical Society. Waterloo Metal Stampings continued to operate eventually relocating to Manitou Drive in Kitchener, Ontario, under the name Waterloo Furniture Components.

== Legacy ==
At the time of his death he was remembered for his contributions to the community by the Kitchener-Waterloo Record: "Mr. Thiele was not only a talented bandsman but he also was gifted as an organizer. He did much to improve the standard of band music in Canada. Mr. Thiele's demise has deprived Waterloo of a great booster and a valuable citizen". He was remembered in a similar light by composer and music conductor Howard Cable, who in 2016 referred to Thiele as a "hidden star" without whom Canadian music could not have attained its current status.

== Publications ==
The Pocket Dictionary of Musical Terms; Also the Rudiments of Music. Waterloo, ON: Waterloo Music Company. 1950.
