= Victor Bouchard =

- Born: April 11, 1926, Sainte-Claire de Dorchester, near Quebec City, Quebec, Canada
- Died: March 22, 2011 (aged 84), Quebec City, Quebec, Canada
- Genres: classical music
- Occupations: Canadian pianist and composer
- Instrument: Piano
- Years active: 1952–2003

Victor Bouchard OC CQ (April 11, 1926 – March 22, 2011) was a Canadian pianist and composer.

Bouchard received his first musical training from 1941 to 1946 at the Collège de Lévis with Father Alphonse Tardif. Then he studied at the Conservatoire de musique du Québec under Tardif (harmony), Hélène Landry (piano) and Françoise Aubut (theory). In 1950 he married pianist Renée Morisset.

From 1950 to 1953 Bouchard studied in Paris, where he was a student of Alfred Cortot and Antoine Reboulot. From 1952 he performed with his wife as a piano duo. They toured Canada, Belgium, Holland and Italy starting in the mid-1950s. After debuting at Carnegie Hall, they made many appearances in the United States between 1965 and 1970.

Several composers wrote pieces for the duo. These include Clermont Pépin's Nombres for two pianos and orchestra (1963), Roger Matton's Concerto (1964) and a sonata by Jacques Hétu. For a recording of Matton's concerto, they were awarded the Prix Pierre-Mercure.

Bouchard was President of the Jeunesses musicales du Canada from 1957 to 1959 and in 1961 became vice president of the Académie de musique du Québec. From 1967 to 1971 he worked for the Ministry of Education of Quebec, and from 1978 to 1980 as the General Director of the Quebec Conservatory. Besides chamber works (including a string quartet and a Danse canadienne for violin and piano) Bouchard composed more than 100 French-Canadian folk song arrangements.

== Awards ==
- 1964 - Prix Calixa-Lavallée (to the duo Bouchard-Morisset)
- 1981 - Member of the Order of Canada
- 1985 - Officer of the Order of Canada
- 1994 - Knight of the National Order of Quebec
- 1997 - Académie des Grands Québécois (to the duo Bouchard-Morisset)
- 2002 - Médaille Gloire de l'Escolle
- 2004 - Prize of the foundation of the Orchestre symphonique de Québec (to the duo Bouchard-Morisset)

== See also ==
- Université Laval
