= Jeannine Vanier =

Canadian composer and organist (1929–2023)

Marie Antoinette Jeannine Vanier (21 August 1929 – 7 March 2023) was a Canadian composer and organist who was born blind.

Vanier was born in the Laval-des-Rapides neighbourhood of Laval, Quebec, to Émile and Alice Laurin Vanier. Her father was an engineer. She began her studies at the Nazareth Institute for the Blind, then earned a Bachelor of Music (1950) and a Licentiate of Music (1952) at the University of Montreal. Among her teachers were Françoise Aubut, Jean Papineau-Couture, Roger Filiatrault, Conrad Letendre, Georges Lindsay, Clermont Pépin, and Jean Vallerand.

Vanier received several awards for her compositions and musical performances, including:

- Second Prize, Casavat Organ Society Competition (1948)
- First Prize, Royal Canadian College of Organists (1952)
- Sarah Fischer Concerts Scholarship (1959)
- CAMMAC (Canadian Amateur Musicians) Competition (1962)

Vanier served as the organist at several churches in Canada: St. Paul de la Croix (1952-1974) St. Bernardin de Sienne (1978), St. Léon de Westmount (1979-81), St. Casimir (1983-5), and St. André Apôtre (1989-94). She also taught music at the Nazareth Institute and the University of Montreal. Her manuscripts are archived at the Bibliothèque du Quebec.

In retirement, Vanier copied scores and piano methods in Braille for the Canadian National Institute for the Blind. She said, "You have to try to help others so as not to worry too much about yourself. Every morning I say a prayer of gratitude."

Vanier died in Montreal on 7 March 2023, the age of 93.

Vanier's music is published by Waterloo Music Company and Berandol Music Limited/BMI. Her compositions include:

- Cinq Pieces pour Enfants (piano)
- Fantasia for Recorder Trio
- Salve Regina (chorus and orchestra)
