= Audrey Piggott =

British cellist and composer (1906–2001)

Audrey Margaret Piggott (21 March 1906 - 9 August 2001) was a British cellist, composer and writer who was born in England and emigrated to Canada, where she lived until the end of her life. In addition to composing and performing, she wrote several episodes for Canadian television programs.

Piggott was born in London to Margaret Lilian Smith and Harry Edward Piggott. As a child, she studied piano and cello and attended St. Agnes’ School in Torquay, England. She earned an Associate of the Royal College of Music London certification (ARCM), then received a scholarship to study at the Ecole Normale de Musique in Paris. Her teachers included Diran Alexanian, Marmaduke Barton and Ivor James. She played for Pablo Casals on one of his annual visits to the Ecole Normale.

In 1924, Piggott received an award for cello performance from the Royal College of Music. In 1931, she made her debut as a cellist at Wigmore Hall in London, followed by numerous concert appearances, including as a soloist with the BBC Orchestra among others. During the 1930s, she also taught piano and cello at Winchester College (1931-36) and St. Swithun’s School in Winchester (1931-39). From 1940 to 1943, she worked as a “music organizer” in southwest England before emigrating to Canada.

In Canada, Piggott wrote several episodes for the television programs Encounter (1952), Studio Pacific (1959), and First Person (1960). She taught cello and performed with several groups, including Vancouver’s first string quartet, the de Rimanoczy String Quartet. She served as president of the Vancouver Cello Club from 1983 to 1989.

Piggott’s compositions were published by Leslie Music Supply and Western Music Company, and included incidental music for television and plays, as well as vocal music:

== Vocal ==
- “Boy’s Song” (text by James Hogg)
- “Consolation” (text by Elizabeth Barrett Browning)
- “Death” (text by Thomas Hood)
- Elizabethan Songs
- “Friendship” (text by Hartley Coleridge)
- “Lelant” (text by Sir Edmund Charles)
- On Westminster Bridge (for soprano and alto; text by William Wordsworth)
- “Silence” (text by Thomas Hood)
- Two Songs
