= Western Music Company =

The Western Music Company (WMC) was a music publishing and retailing firm based in Vancouver, British Columbia, Canada. Founded in 1930 by Herbert Drost, the company was initially a retail store for sheet music but soon expanded to include records and instruments to its merchandise. The company also operated branches in Winnipeg, Manitoba (1938–56), Toronto, Ontario (1948–55), and Victoria, British Columbia (1945-9 and 1954–73). In 1970, the company was acquired by Leslie Music Supply of Oakville, Ontario.

In 1937 WMC began to publish sheet music; much of which was published for use in competitions/festivals and for school and church use. The company was the sole Canadian agent for Novello & Co, J.B Cramer & Co, Edward Arnold Publishers Ltd, and other British firms for many years. In the United States the WMC's publications were sold by the British-American Music Co of Chicago. By 1960 the company had published more than 450 original works by Canadian composers like W.H. Anderson, Dalton Baker, H. Hugh Bancroft, Keith Bissell, Frederick Chubb, George Coutts, T.J. Crawford, Arthur Egerton, Robert Fleming, Leonard Heaton, H.E. Key, Burton Kurth, Kenneth Meek, Adelmo Melecci, Bernard Naylor, Clermont Pépin, Audrey Piggott, Max Pirani, Alfred Whitehead, and Healey Willan among others. The firm also published the treatise Full-throated Ease by James Terry Lawson (1955).

In 1934 WMC began issuing a monthly magazine, Western Music News. The magazine was primarily a promotional vehicle for the company's merchandise but did also include articles on musical life in Canada and profiles on Canadian musicians. The magazine became a bi-annual publication in 1941 and ceased publication after 1955.
