= Covered bridge =

Wooden bridge with protective cover

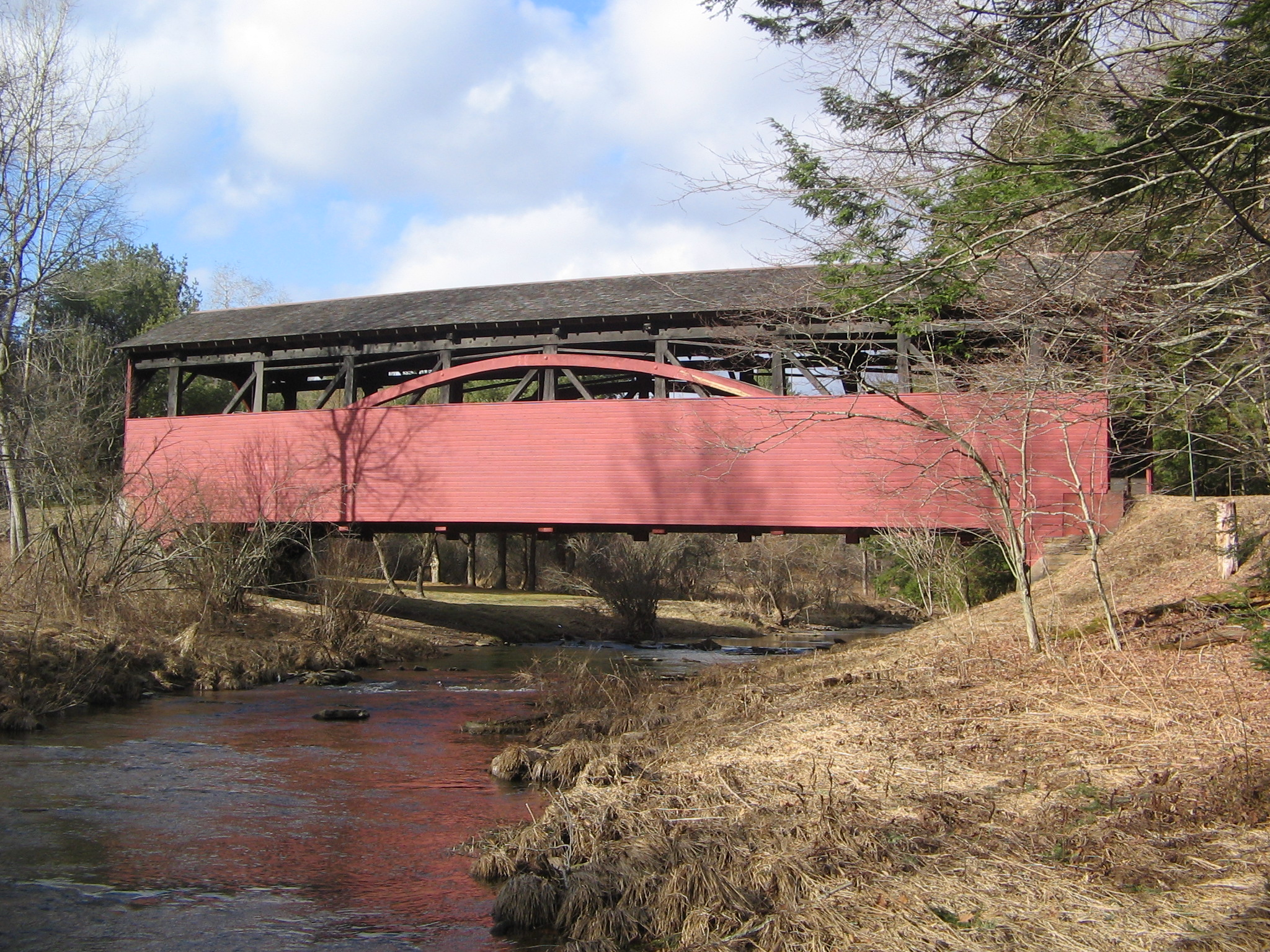
- The Cogan House Covered Bridge, Pennsylvania
- Span range: Short
- Material: Typically wood beams with iron fittings and iron rods in tension
- Movable: No
- Design effort: Low
- Falsework required: Determined by enclosed bridge structure, site conditions, and degree of prefabrication

A covered bridge is a timber-truss bridge with a roof, decking, and siding, which in most covered bridges create an almost complete enclosure. The purpose of the covering is to protect the wooden structural members from the weather. Uncovered wooden bridges typically have a lifespan of only 20 years because of the effects of snow and rain, but a covered bridge can last over 100 years. In the United States, only about 1 in 10 survived the 20th century. The relatively small number of surviving bridges is due to deliberate replacement, neglect, and the high cost of restoration.

Surviving covered bridges often attract touristic attention due to their rarity, quaint appearance, and bucolic settings. Many are considered historic and have been the subject of historic preservation campaigns.

== European and North American truss bridges ==
Typically, covered bridges are structures with longitudinal timber-trusses which form the bridge's backbone. Some were built as railway bridges, using very heavy timbers and doubled up lattice work.

In Canada and the U.S., numerous timber covered bridges were built in the late 1700s to the late 1800s, reminiscent of earlier designs in Germany and Switzerland. They tend to be in isolated places, making them vulnerable to vandalism and arson.

=== Europe ===
The oldest surviving truss bridge in the world is the Kapellbrücke in Switzerland, first built in the 1300s. Modern-style timber truss bridges were pioneered in Switzerland in the mid-1700s. Germany has 70 surviving historic wooden covered bridges.

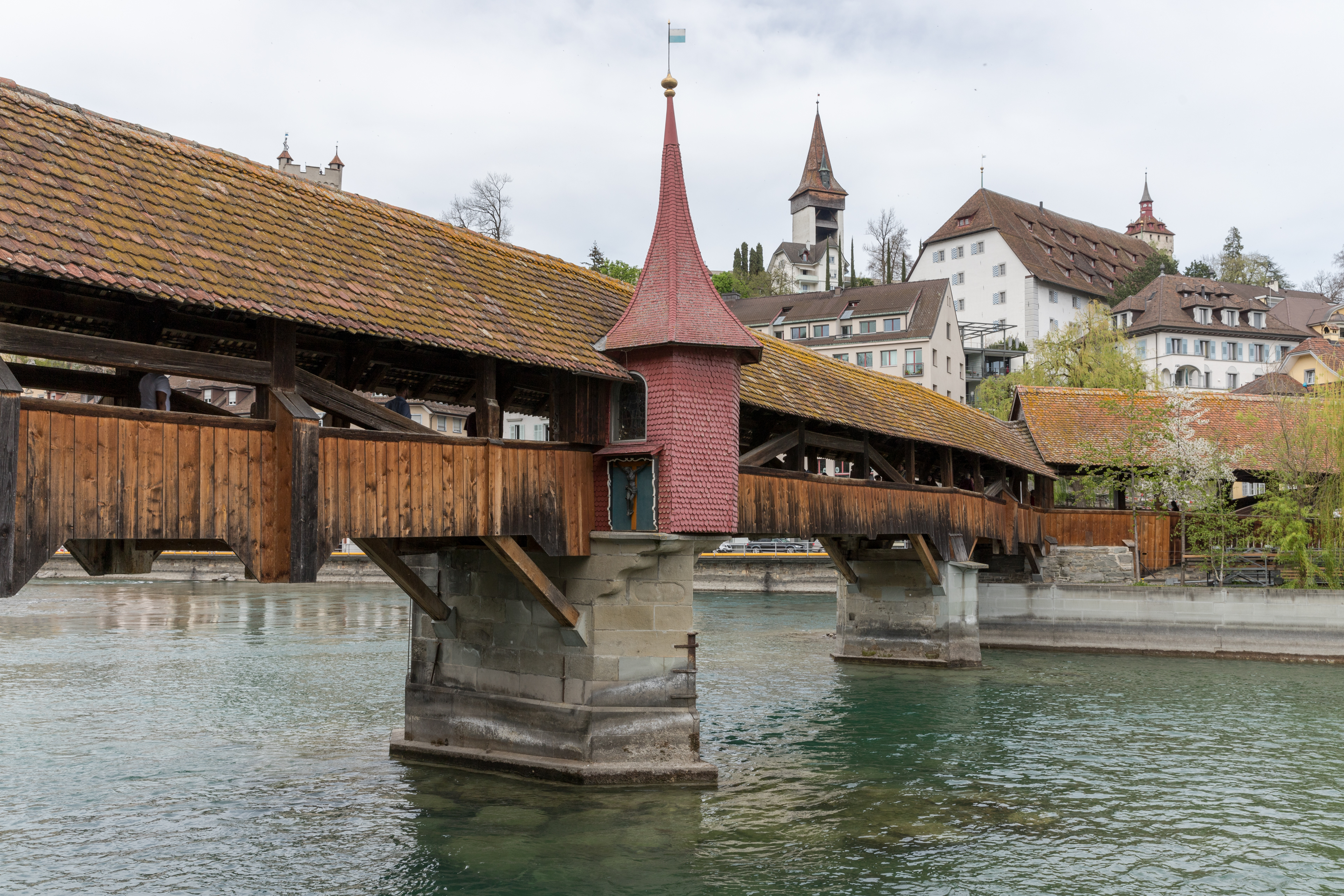
Spreuer Bridge in Lucerne

- The Holzbrücke Bad Säckingen spans the river Rhine from Bad Säckingen, Germany, to Stein, Switzerland. It was first built before 1272, and has been destroyed and rebuilt many times.
- Switzerland has many timber covered bridges, including Kapellbrücke, Spreuer Bridge, and Neubrügg.
- The Ponte Coperto in Pavia is a stone and brick arch bridge over the Ticino River in Pavia, Italy. The previous bridge, dating from 1354 (itself a replacement for a Roman construction), was heavily damaged by Allied bombing in 1945. A debate on whether to fix or replace it ended when the bridge partially collapsed in 1947, requiring new construction, which began in 1949.

=== North America ===
Most bridges were built to cross streams, and the majority had just a single span. Virtually all contained a single lane. A few two-lane bridges were built, having a third, central truss.

Many different truss designs were used. One of the most popular designs was the Burr Truss, patented in 1817, which used an arch to bear the load, while the trusses kept the bridge rigid. Other designs included the King, Queen, Lattice, and Howe trusses.

Early trusses were designed with only a rough understanding of the engineering dynamics at work. In 1847, American engineer Squire Whipple published the first correct analysis of the precise ways that a load is carried through the components of a truss, which enabled him to design stronger bridges with fewer materials.

==== United States ====
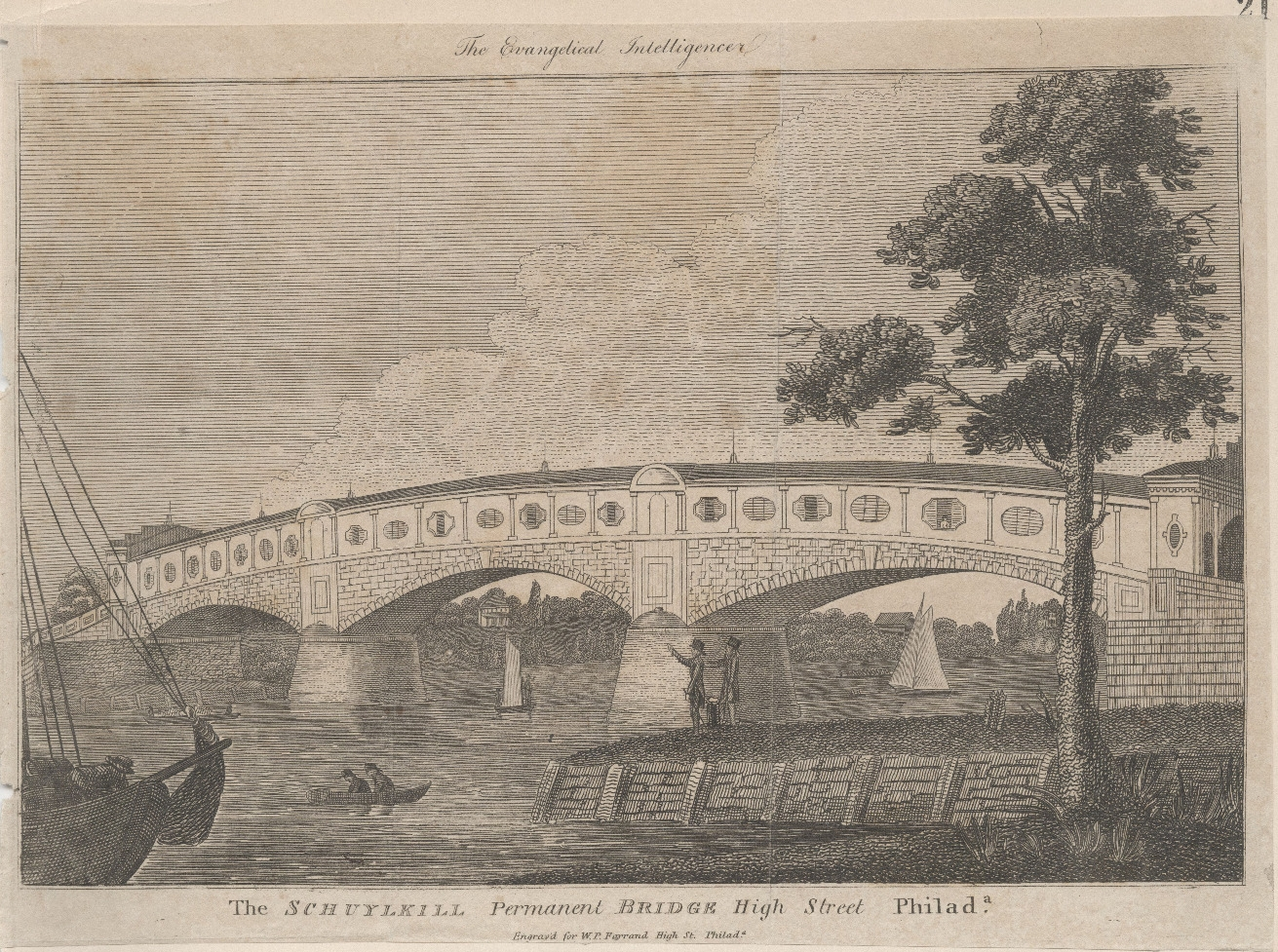
Schuylkill Permanent Bridge in Philadelphia, the first documented covered bridge in America

About 14,000 covered bridges have been built in the United States, mostly in the years 1825 to 1875. The first documented was the Permanent Bridge, completed in 1805 to span the Schuylkill River in Philadelphia. However, most other early examples of covered bridges do not appear until the 1820s. Extant bridges from that decade include New York's Hyde Hall Bridge and Pennsylvania's Hassenplug Bridge, both built in 1825, and the Haverhill–Bath Covered Bridge and the Roberts Covered Bridge, in New Hampshire and Ohio respectively, both built in 1829.

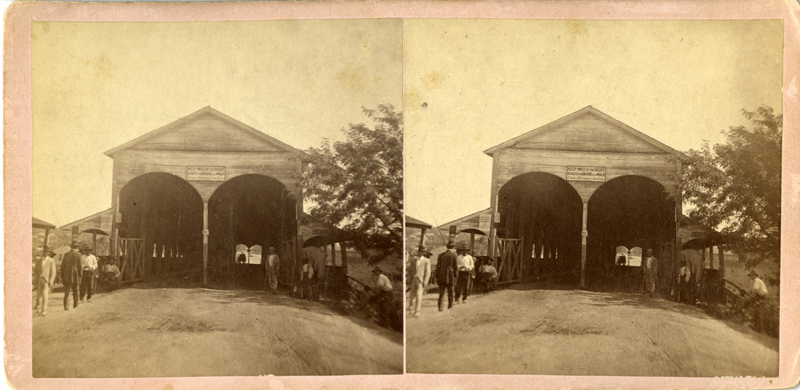
Covered bridge in Macon, Georgia, 1877

The longest covered bridge ever built was constructed in 1814 in Lancaster County, Pennsylvania, and spanned over a mile in length, but was destroyed by ice and flooding in 1832. The longest, historical covered bridges remaining in the United States are the Cornish–Windsor Bridge, spanning the Connecticut River between New Hampshire and Vermont, and Medora Bridge, spanning the East Fork of the White River in Indiana. Both lay some claim to the superlative depending upon how the length is measured. The vast majority of America's remaining covered bridges can be found in the eastern states with the notable exception of Oregon, which possesses a collection of around fifty. Among western states, Oregon's covered bridges remain popular because of the state's many waterways and ample supply of lumber, as well as their resemblance to the historic covered wagons synonymous with Oregon's territorial history.

In the mid-19th century, the use of cheaper wrought iron and cast iron led to metal rather than timber trusses. Metal structures did not need protection from the elements, so they no longer needed to be covered. The bridges also became obsolete because most were single-lane, had low width and height clearances, and could not support the heavy loads of modern traffic.

As of 2004, there were about 750 left, mostly in eastern and northern states. The 2021 World Guide to Covered Bridges lists 840 covered bridges in the U.S., although it states that only 670 of those were standing when the 1959 edition was published. The tallest (35 feet high), built in 1892, is the Felton Covered Bridge, just north of Santa Cruz, California.

==== Canada ====
Between 1969 and 2015, the number of surviving covered bridges in Canada declined from about 400 to under 200.

In 1900, Quebec had an estimated 1,000 covered bridges. Relative to the rest of North America, Quebec was late in building covered bridges, with the busiest decade for construction being the 1930s. Initially, the designs were varied, but around 1905, the design was standardised to the Town québécois, a variant on the lattice truss patented by Ithiel Town in 1820. The designer is unknown. About 500 of these were built in the first half of the 20th century. They were often built by local settlers using local materials, according to standard plans. The last agricultural colony was founded in 1948, and the last bridge was built by the Ministry of Colonisation in 1958 in Lebel-sur-Quévillon. There are now 82 covered bridges in Quebec, Transports Québec including the Félix-Gabriel-Marchand Bridge, the province's longest covered bridge. In Quebec covered bridges were sometimes known as pont rouges (red bridges) because of their typical colour.

Like Quebec, New Brunswick continued to build covered bridges into the 1950s, peaking at about 400 covered bridges. These mostly used the Howe, Town, and Burr trusses. Today, there are 58 covered bridges in New Brunswick, including the world's longest, the Hartland Bridge.

Ontario has just two remaining covered bridges, the West Montrose Covered Bridge and the very short covered bridge in Latchford.

== Roofed bridges ==
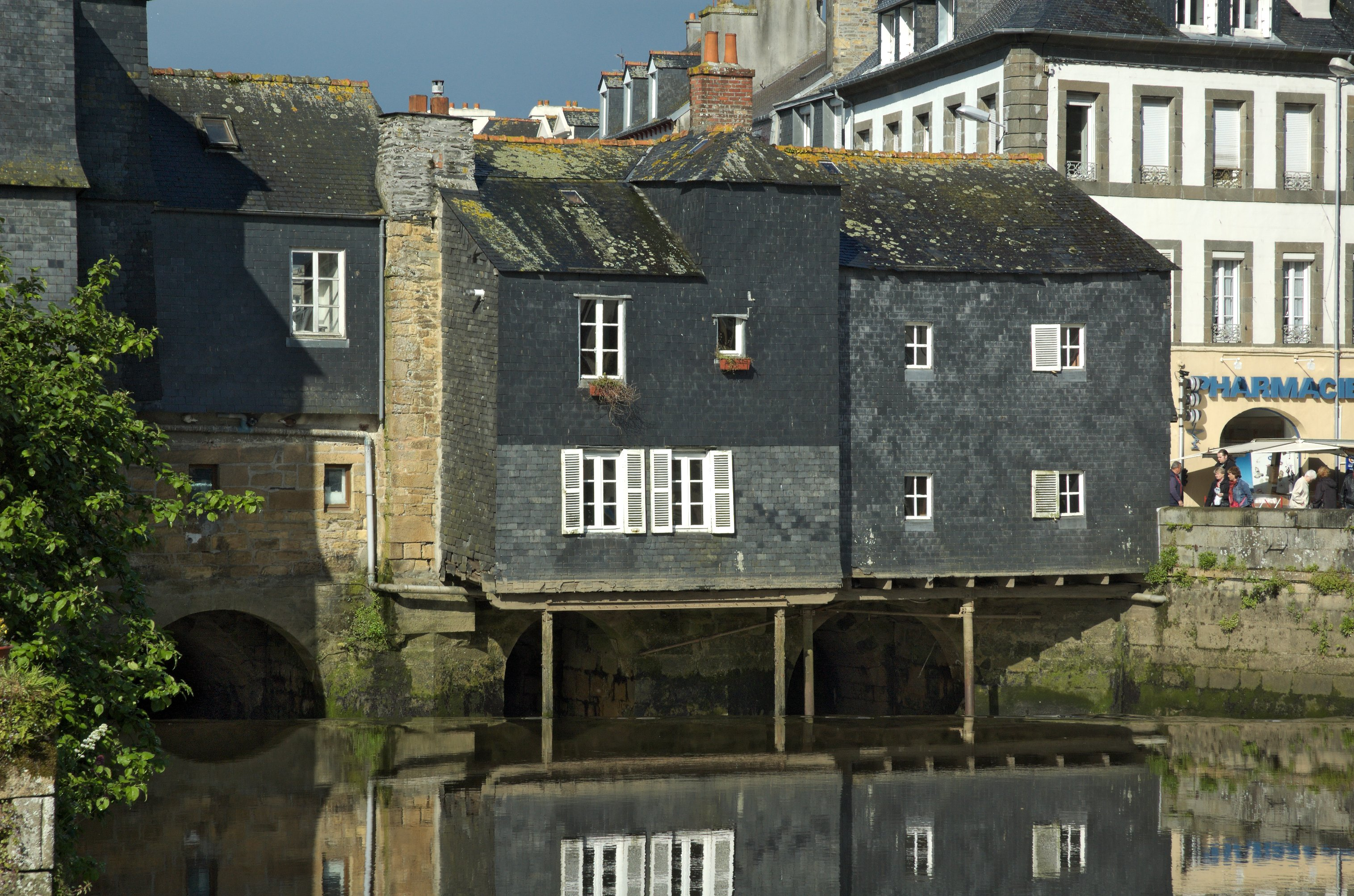
Pont de Rohan in Landerneau, France

Drone video of the wooden roofed Järuska bridge in Estonia

Roofed, rather than covered bridges, have existed for centuries in southern Europe and Asia. In these cases, the cover is to protect the users of the bridge rather than the structure. Examples include:

- The Pont de Rohan in Landerneau, France, and the Pont des Marchands in Narbonne are two of 45 inhabited bridges in Europe.
- A tubular bridge is a bridge built as a rigid box girder section within which the traffic is carried. Examples include the Britannia Bridge and the Conwy Railway Bridge in the United Kingdom.
- A skyway is a type of urban pedway consisting of an enclosed or covered footbridge between two buildings, designed to protect pedestrians from the weather. For example, the Bridge of Sighs in Cambridge, and Oxford's Bridge of Sighs and Logic Lane covered bridge.
- A jet bridge is an enclosed, moveable bridge which extends from an airport terminal gate to an airplane, allowing passengers to board and disembark without having to go outside.
- Some stone arch bridges are covered to protect pedestrians or as a decoration—as with the Italian Ponte Coperto and Rialto Bridge, and the Chùa Cầu (the Japanese Bridge; see Gallery below) in Vietnam.
- In China lángqiáo (廊桥) covered bridges are found in the south, including the Chengyang Bridge and the Xijin Bridge. These are pier and girder bridges, not truss bridges. The Chùa Cầu bridge is found in Vietnam.
- In Europe there are also bridges built not strictly for transport, for example the Český Krumlov Castle Bridge in the Czech Republic, the Lovech Covered Bridge in Bulgaria, and the Ponte Vecchio in Italy.
- Built in 1442 in Bursa, Irgandı Bridge is the only bazaar-bridge that was built in the Ottoman Empire.

== In fiction ==
In addition to being practical, covered bridges were popular venues for a variety of social activities and are an enduring cultural icon; for example:

- The 1992 novel, The Bridges of Madison County, featured the Cedar Covered Bridge, which has since been burnt by arson in 2002, replaced with a replica, and burnt by arson again in 2017.
- The Edgar Allan Poe story "Never Bet the Devil Your Head"
- Plot points in the 1988 comedy films Beetlejuice and Funny Farm refer to them.
- The Diehls Covered Bridge in Pennsylvania is featured in the opening scenes of the 1980s anthology horror television series Tales from the Darkside, created by George A. Romero.
- The Joe Hill novel NOS4A2 features a character who uses a covered bridge called the "Shorter Way" as a portal to travel instantly across vast distances.
- A covered bridge is also used as a portal between two worlds in John Carpenter's horror film In the Mouth of Madness (1994).
- A covered bridge is the focus of two mystery stories in the collection All But Impossible by Edward D. Hoch.

== Gallery ==
=== Covered ===
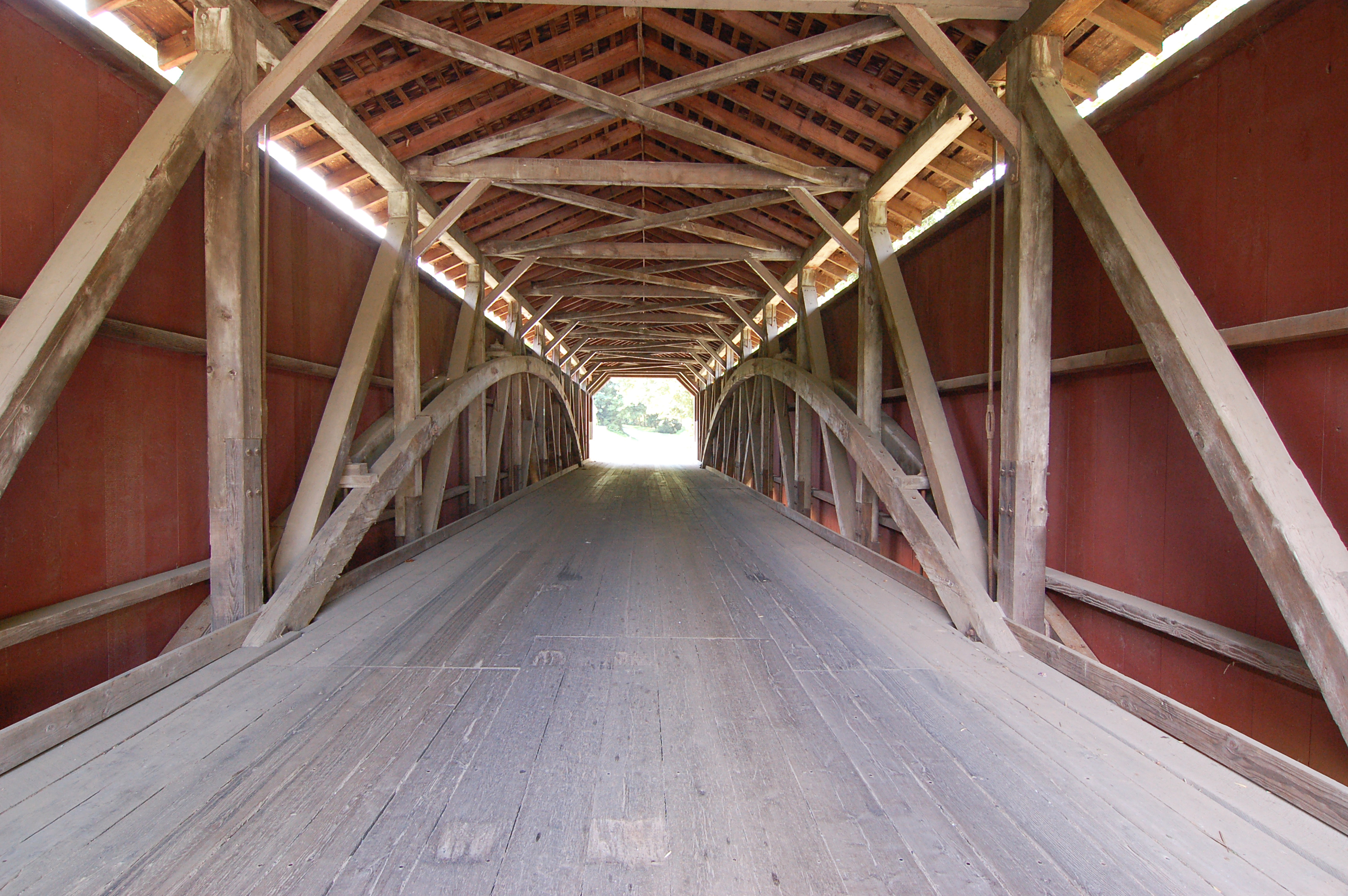
Baumgardener's Covered Bridge, showing the truss protected by the covering

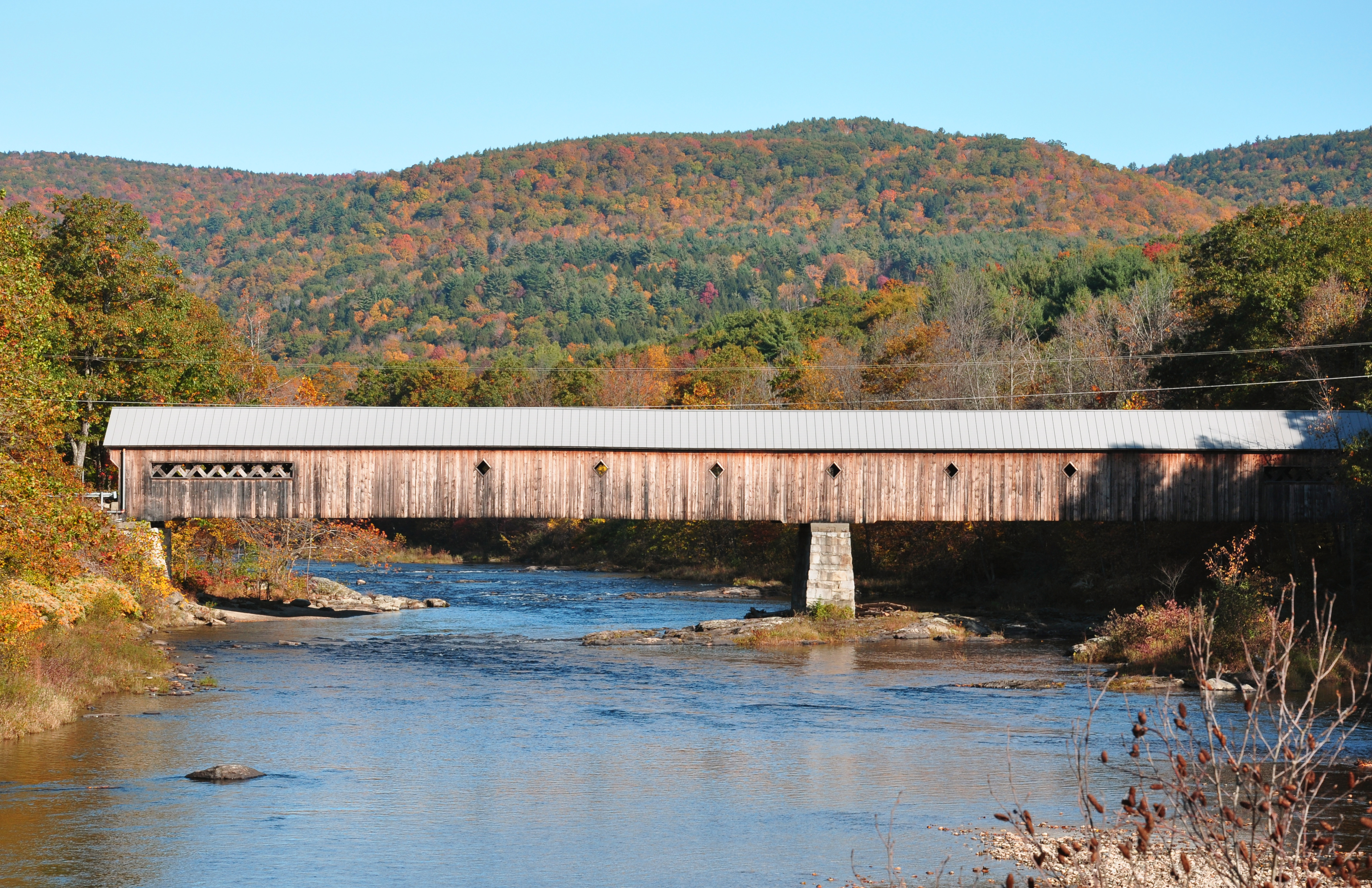
West Dummerston Covered Bridge

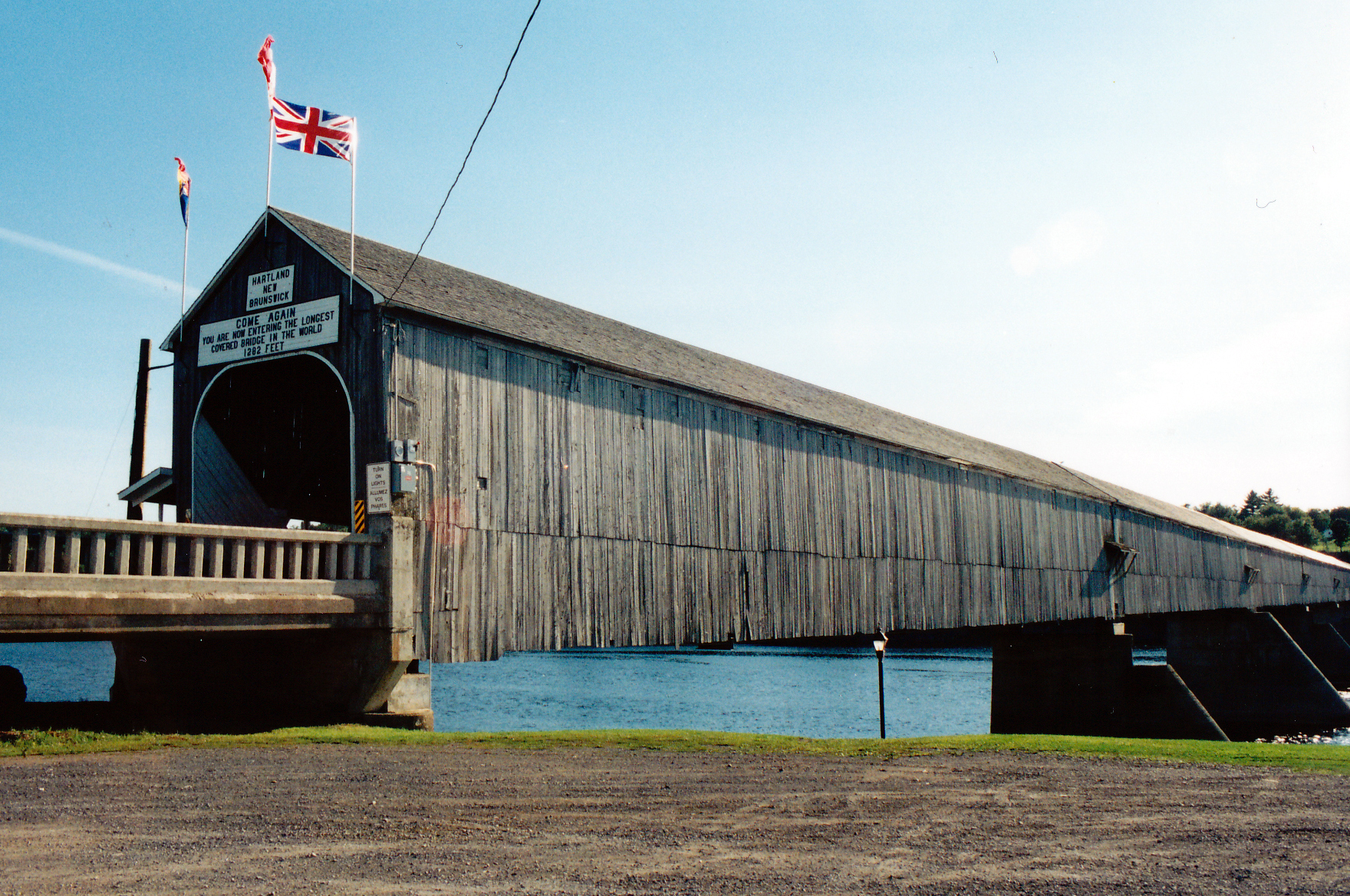
The 1,282-foot (391 m) Hartland Bridge in New Brunswick is the longest covered bridge in the world.

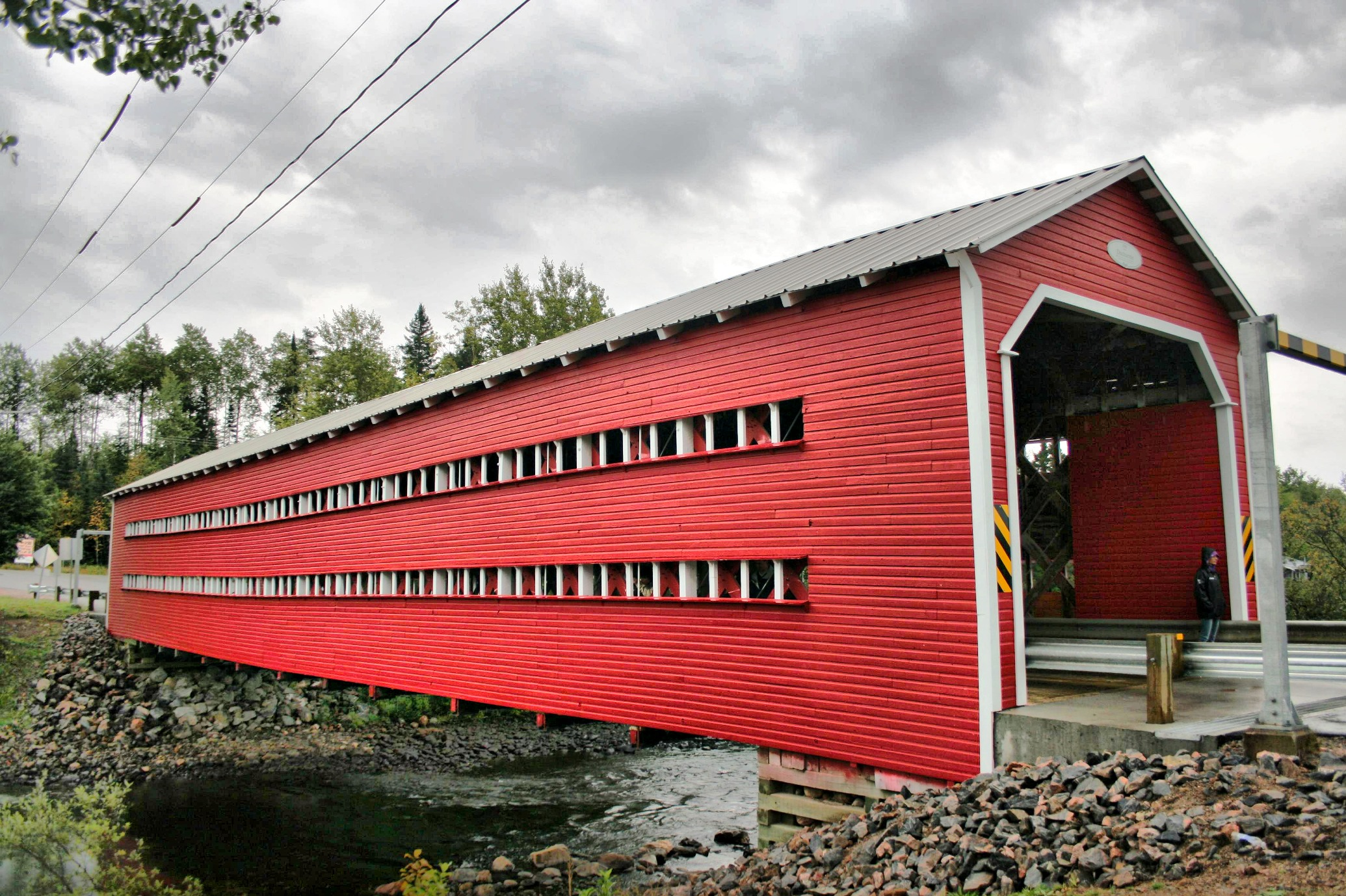
The Ducharme Bridge in Quebec

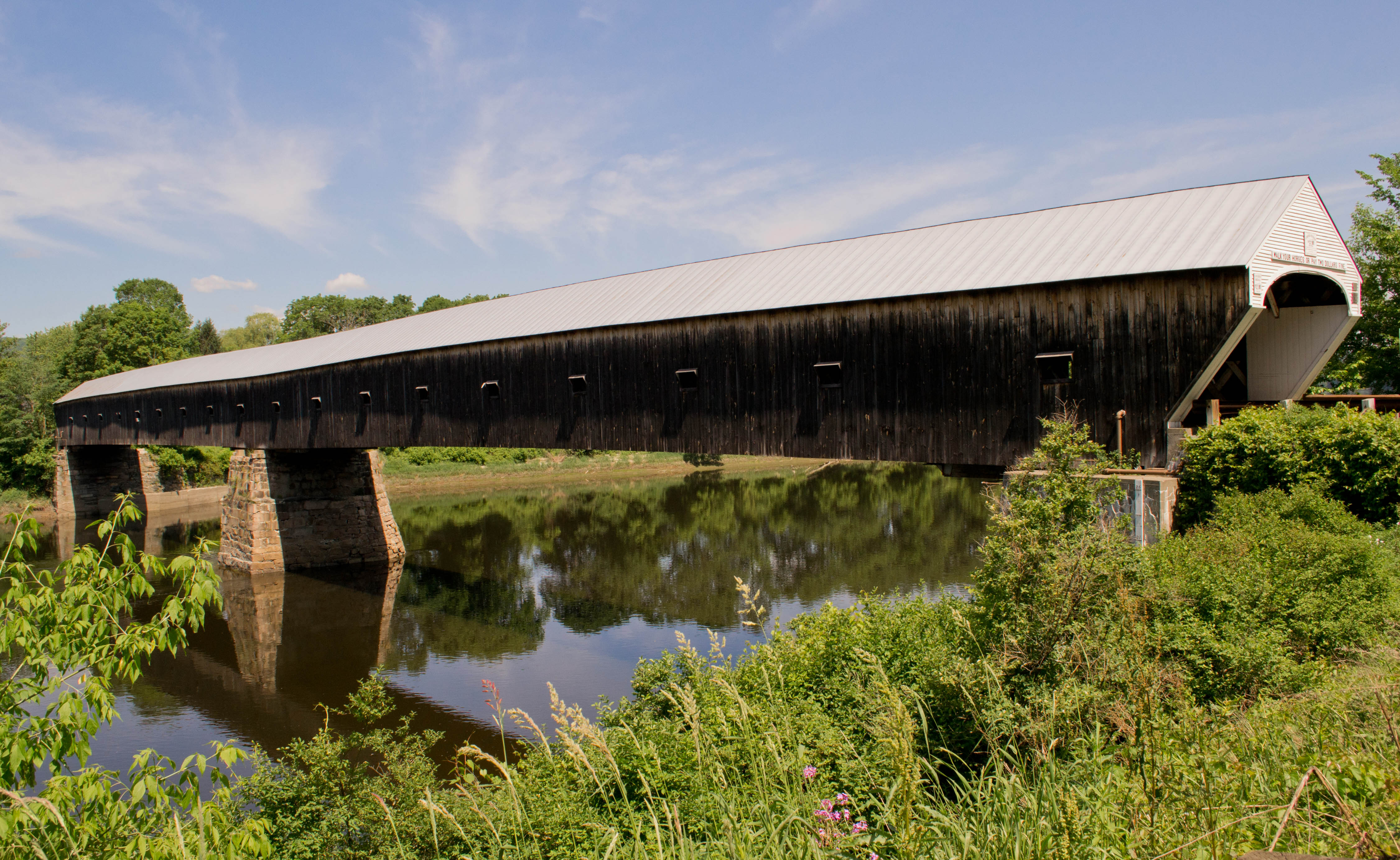
Cornish–Windsor Covered Bridge, built in 1866, is one of the longest covered bridges in the United States.

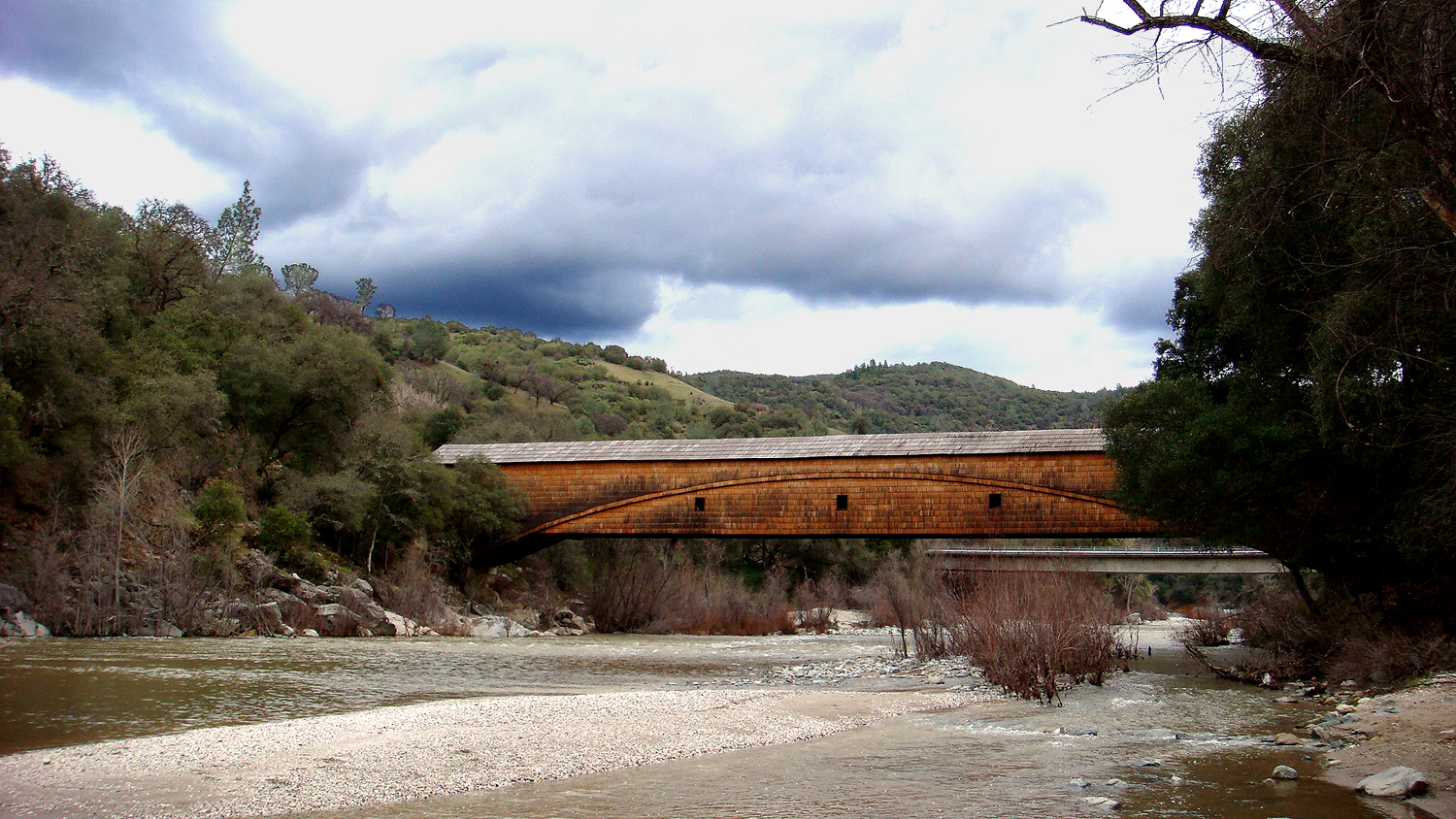
Bridgeport Covered Bridge, built in 1862, is the longest single span wooden covered bridge in the world.

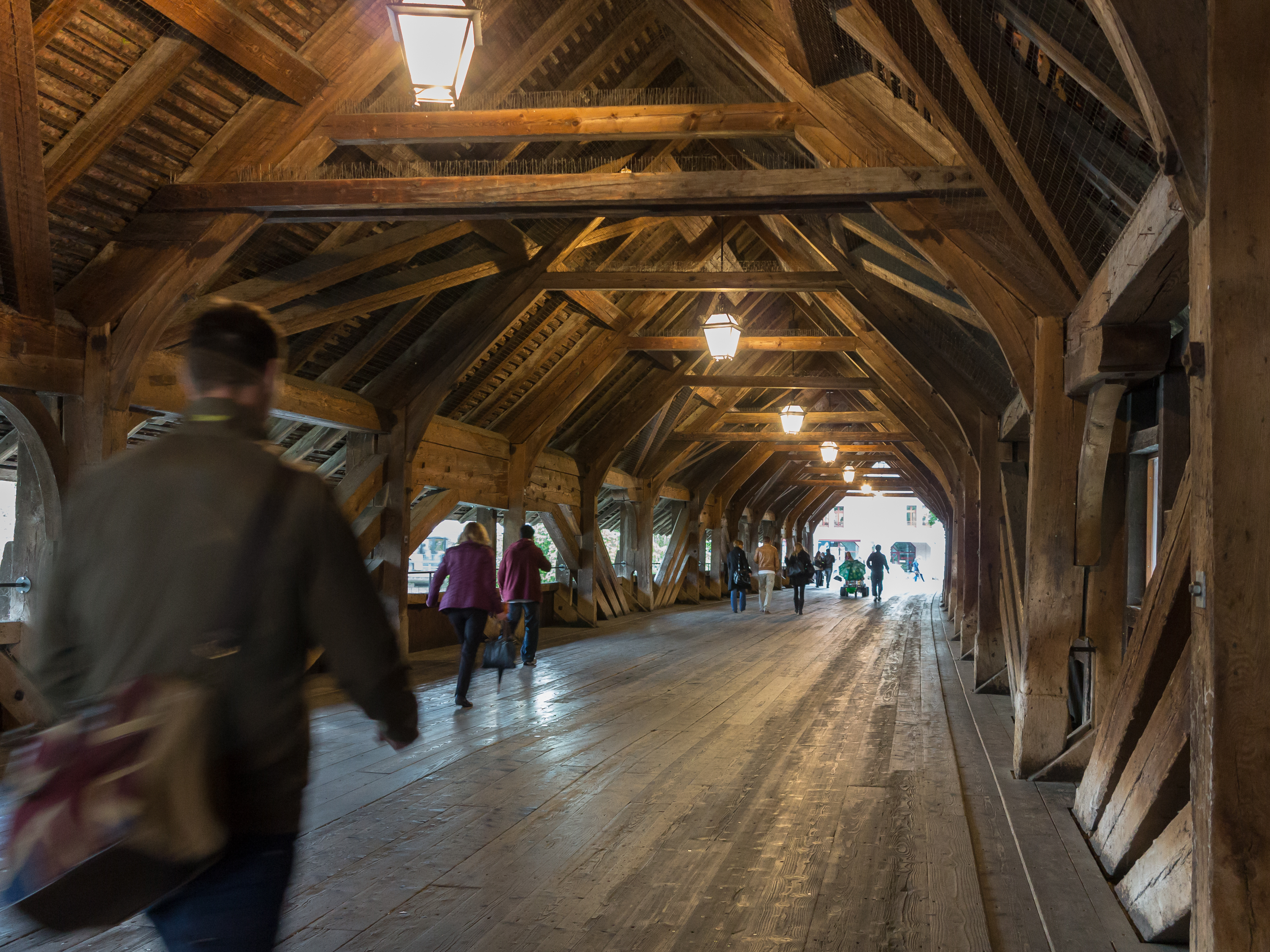
Old bridge in Olten (Switzerland)

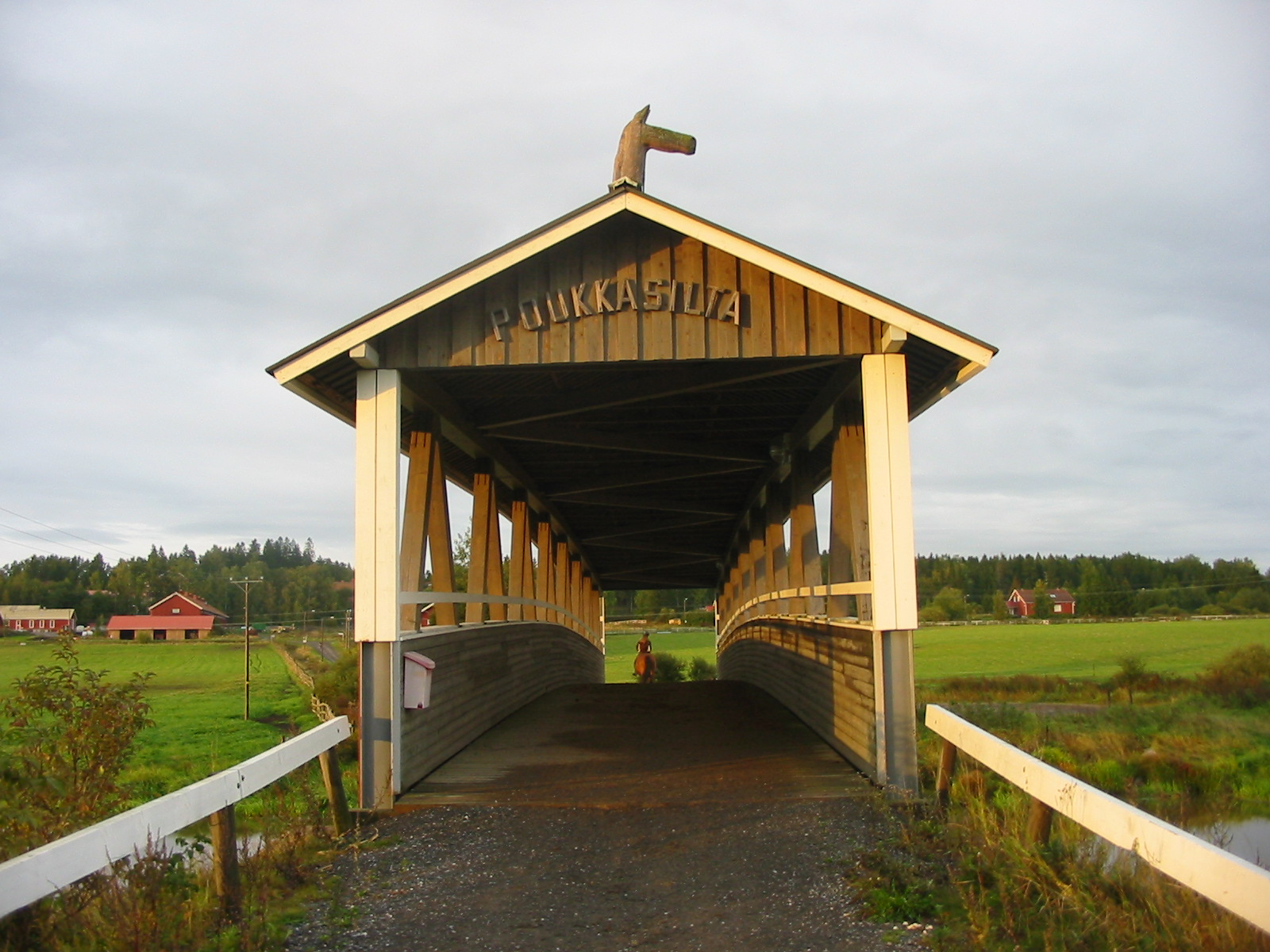
Poukkasilta, a covered bridge over the Loimijoki River in Ypäjä, Finland.

=== Roofed ===
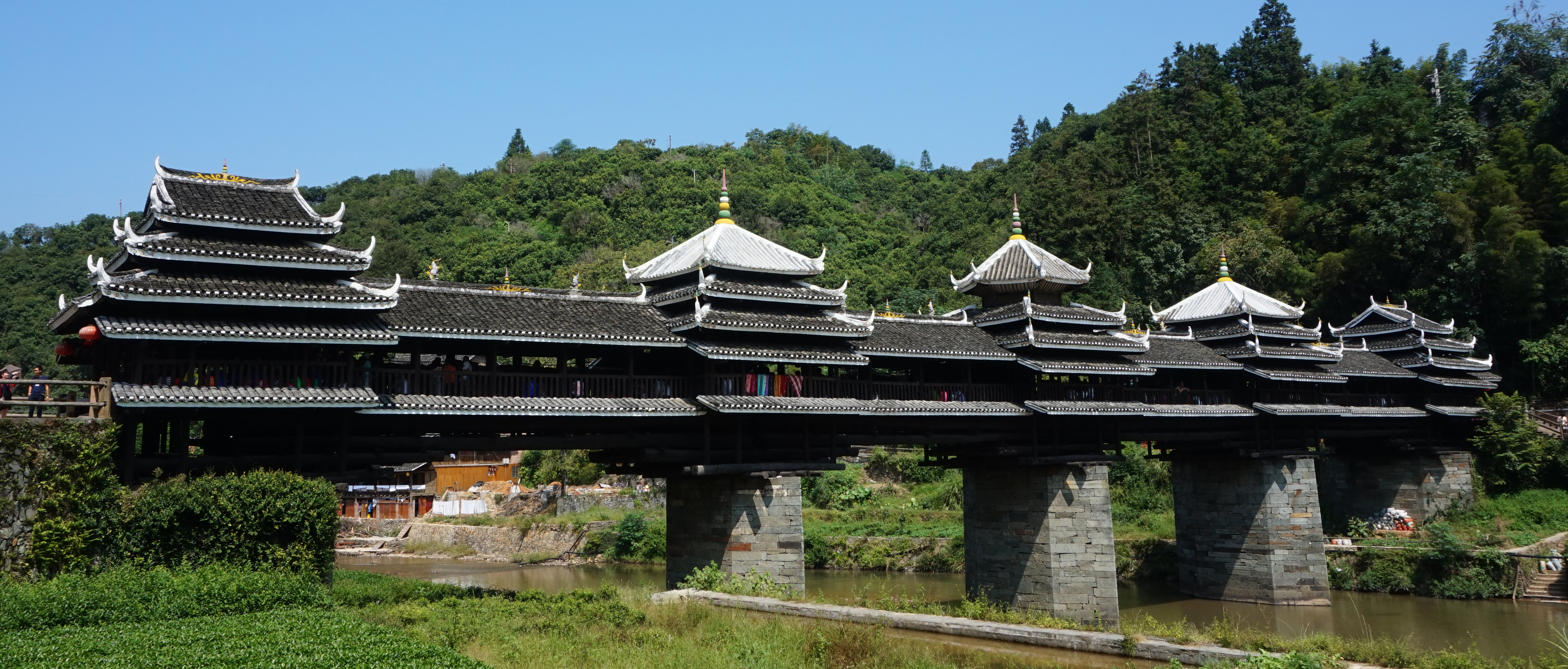
Chengyang Bridge in Guangxi, China

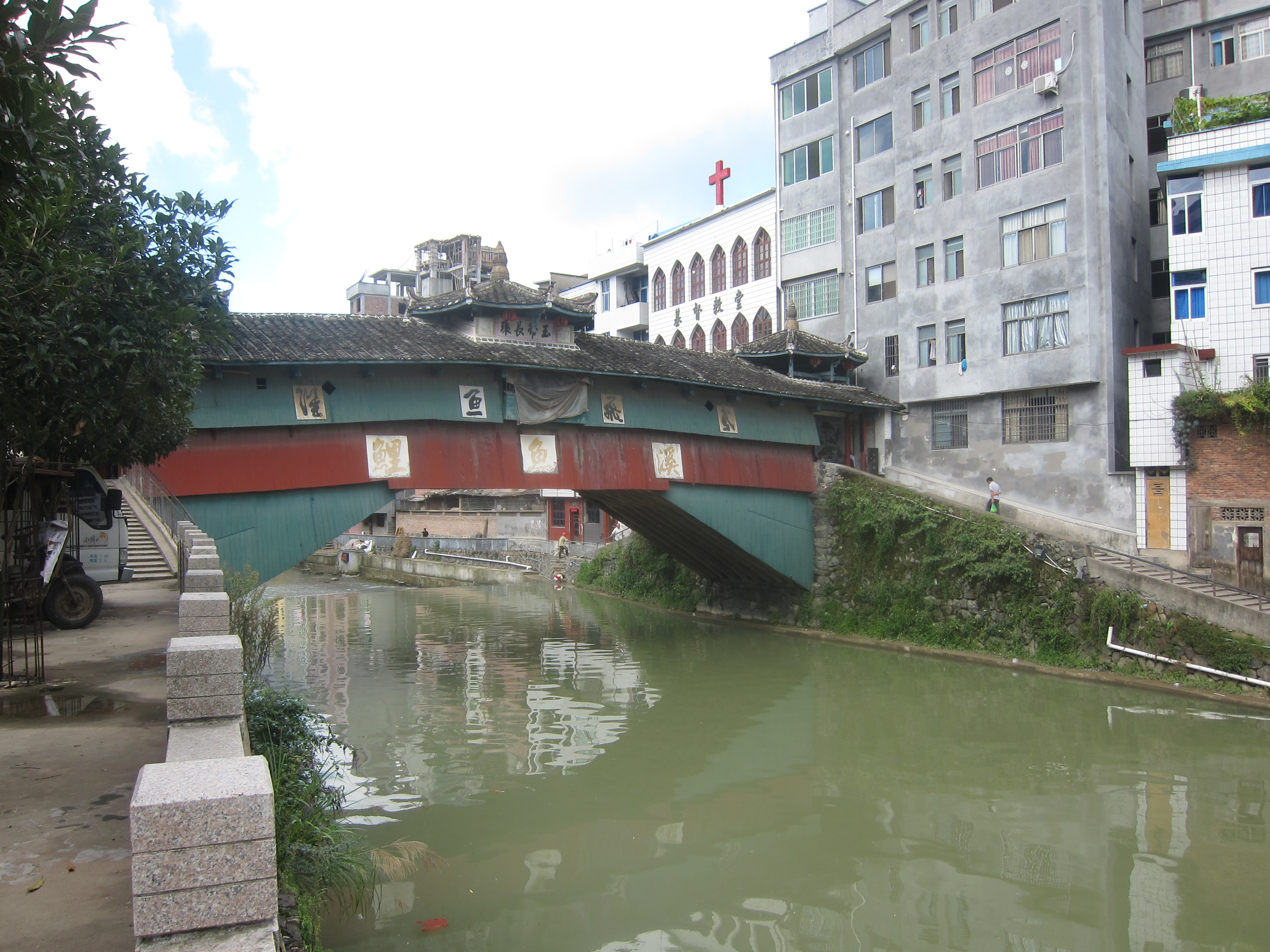
A covered bridge in Shouning County, China

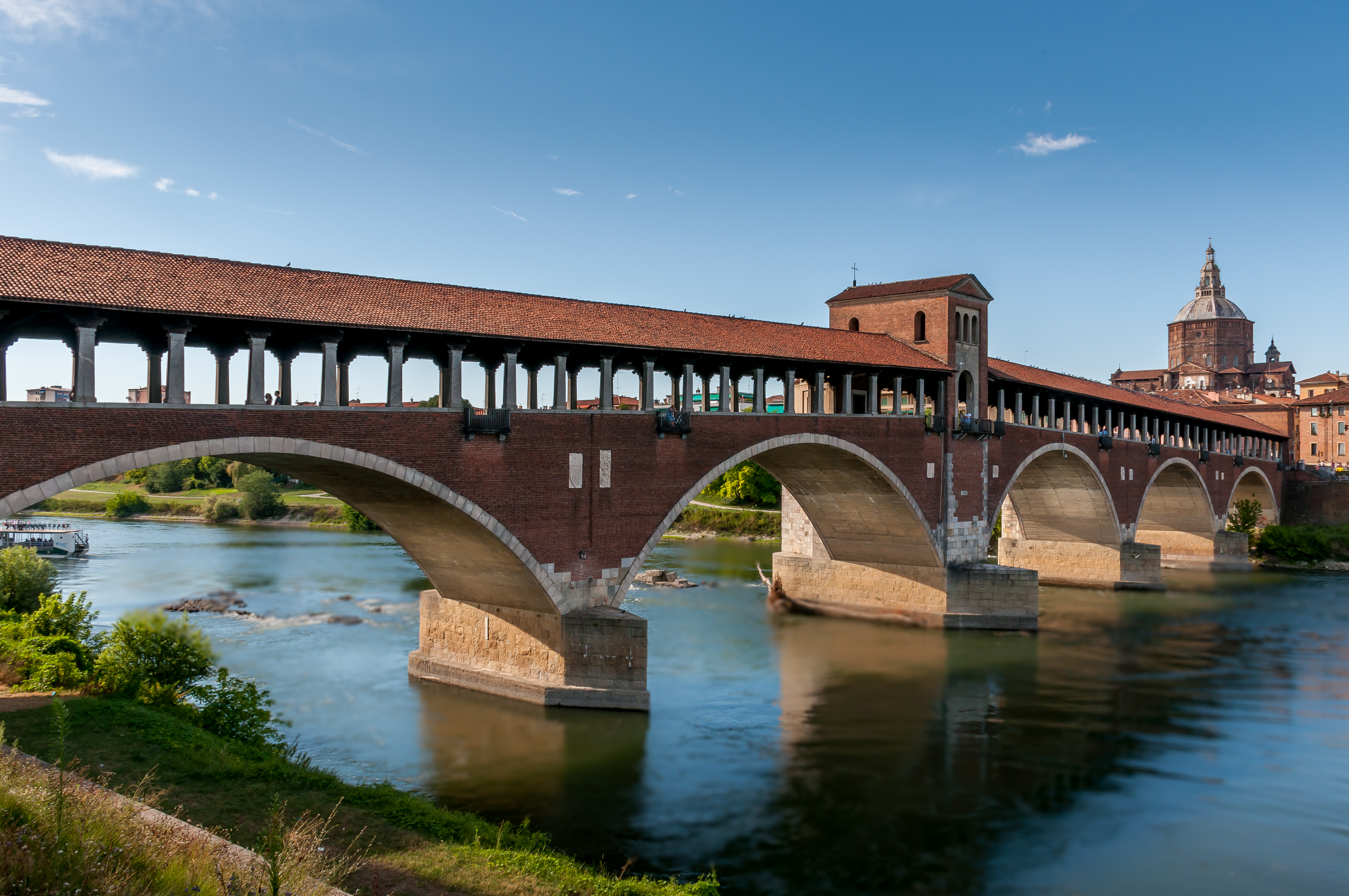
Ponte Coperto in Pavia, Italy

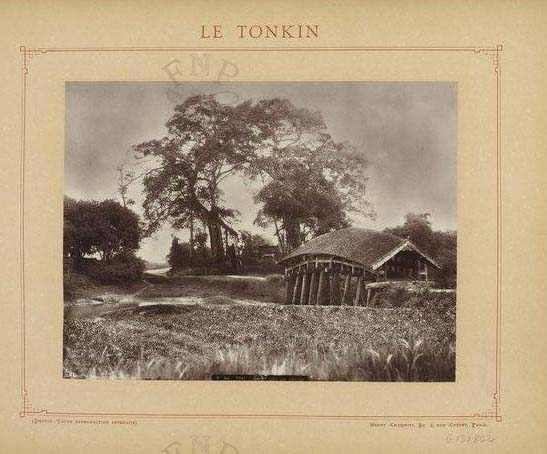
A covered bridge in North Vietnam

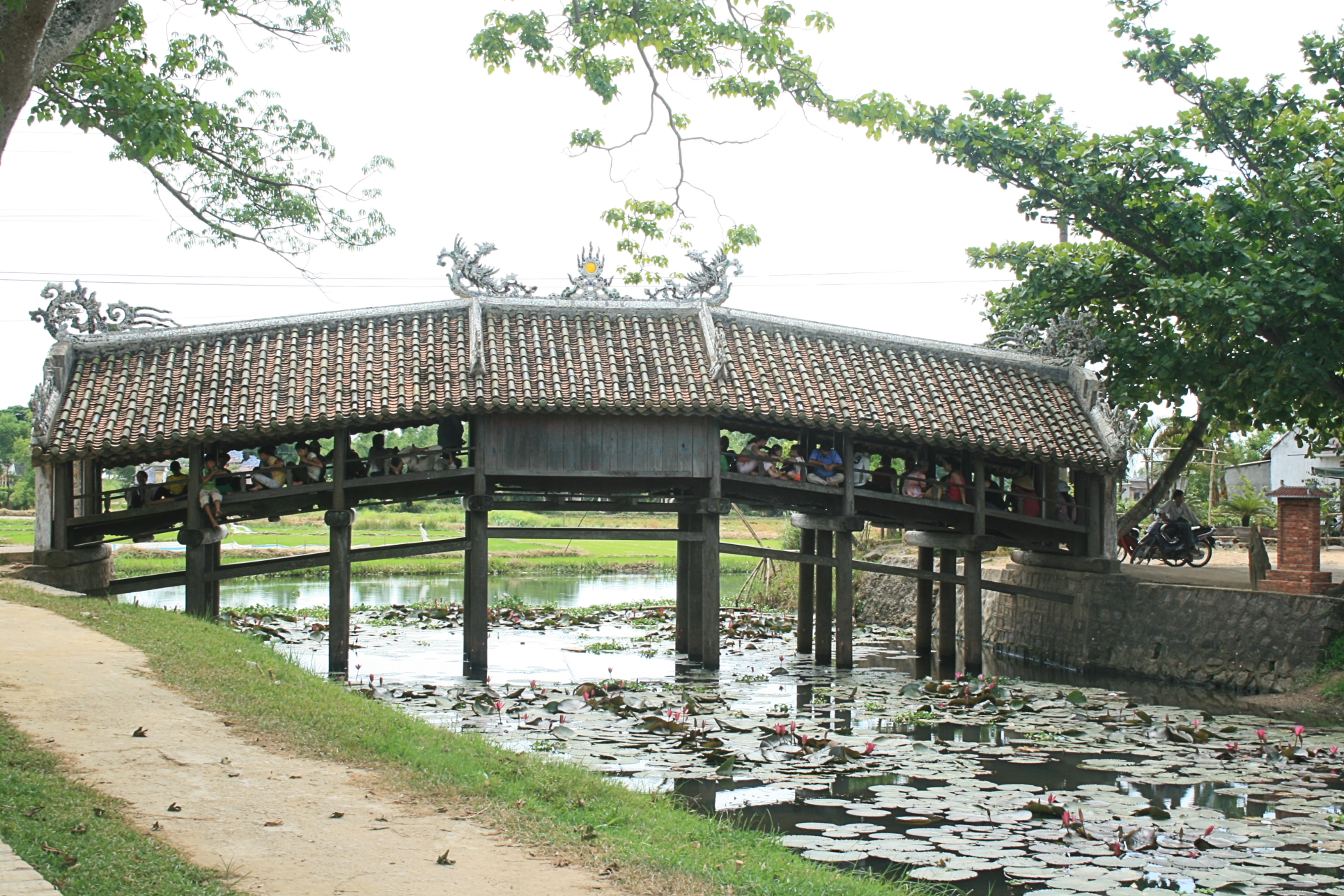
Thanh Toàn Bridge, Huế, Vietnam

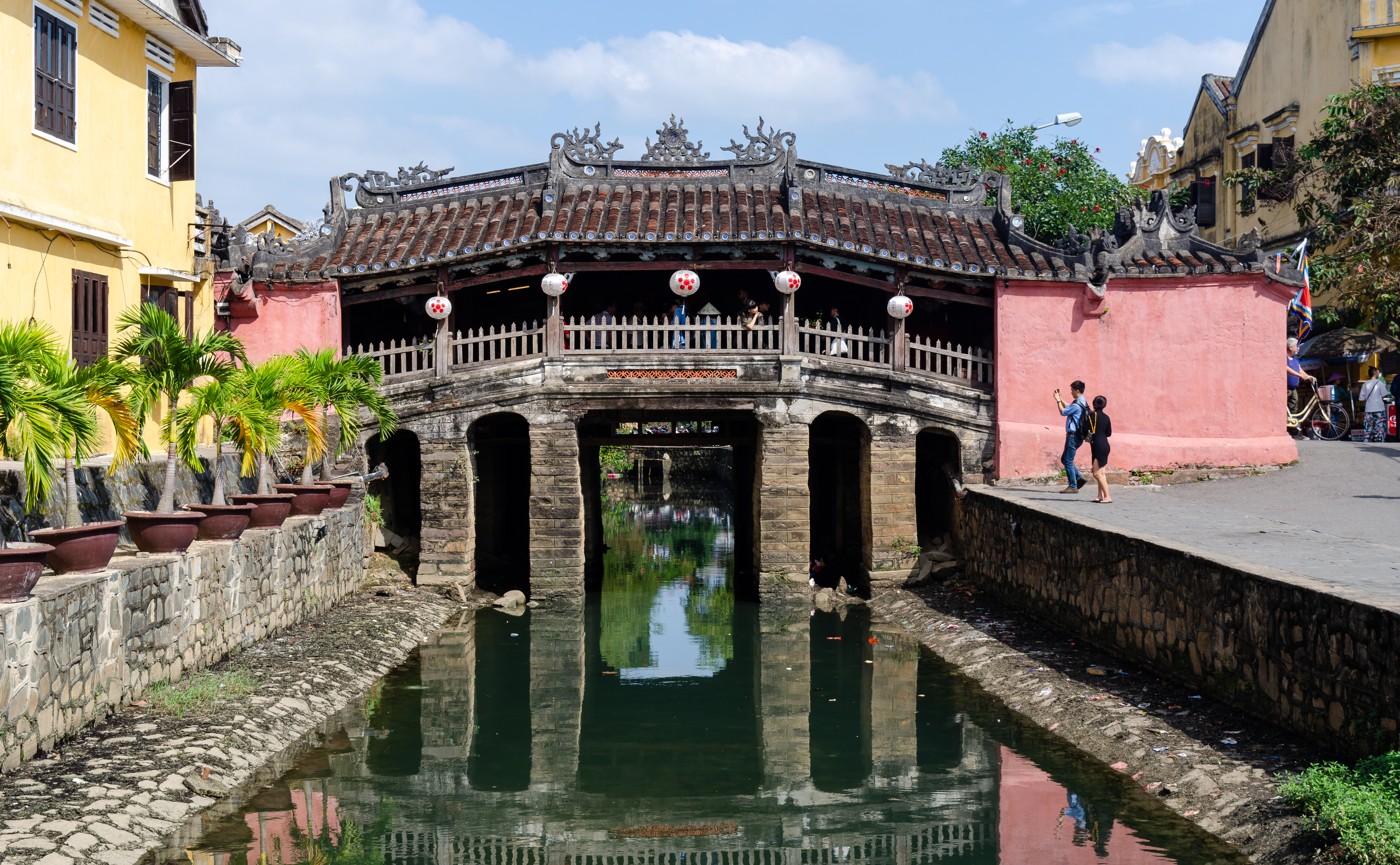
Japanese Bridge in Hội An, Vietnam

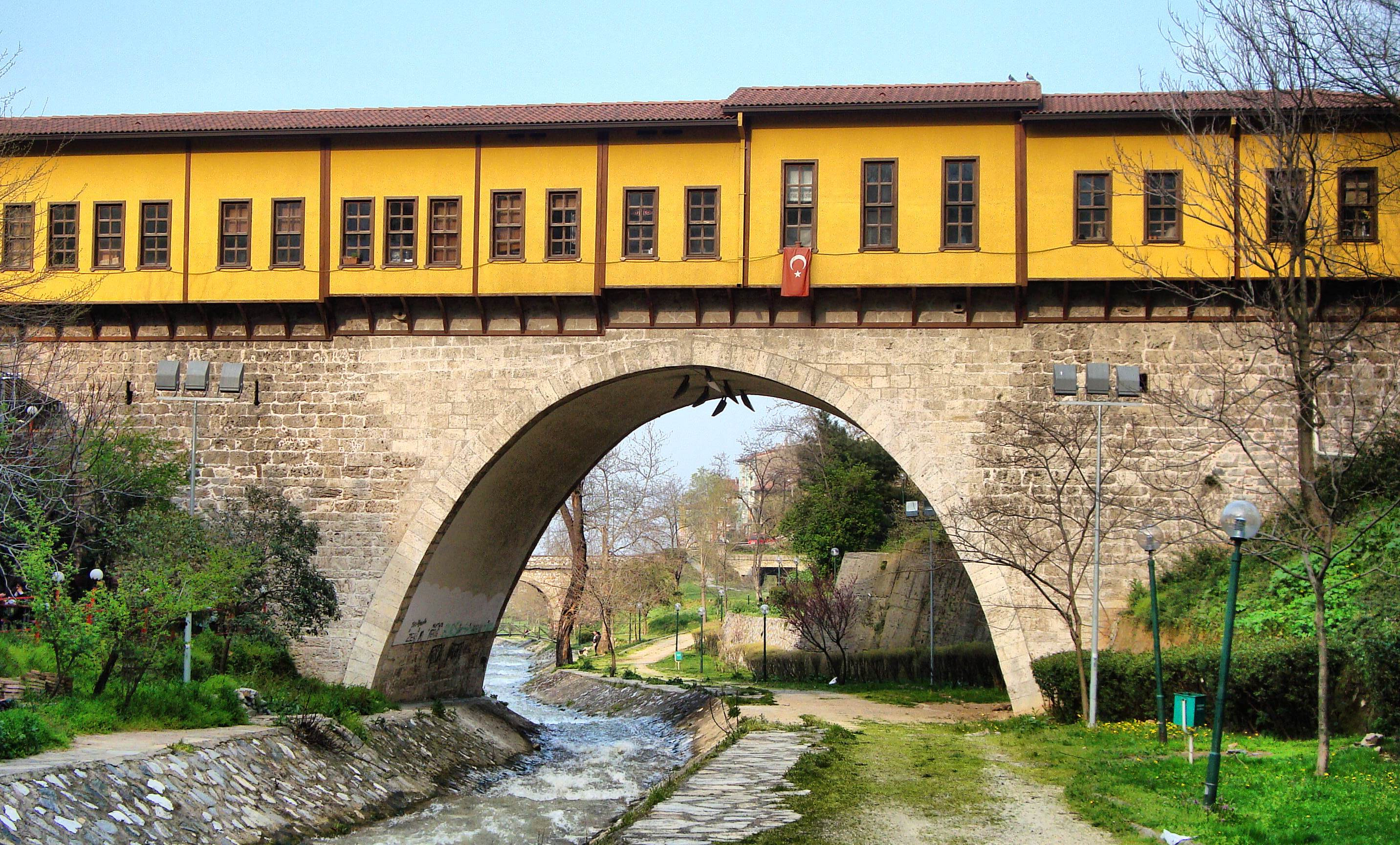
Irgandı Bridge in Bursa, Turkey

== See also ==
- Architectural structure
- List of nonbuilding structure types
- List of bridges with buildings
