= List of bridges with buildings =

There are very few bridges with buildings in the world. This list attempts to identify all the existing ones and notable former ones featuring significant closed commercial, residential, governmental, or religious worship structures. There exist numerous proposals for inhabited bridges, including 73 designs submitted in the Royal Institute of British Architects' competition at the 800th anniversary of London Bridge, but the table here presents only bridges actually built. Various blogs and magazines itemize a small number of them. Many bridges include pavilions or other shelters serving pedestrians crossing the bridge, without providing commercial, residential, governmental, or religious worship space; these are not included.

Some covered or roofed bridges, such as Pont de Rohan, in Landerneau, and the Pont des Marchands, in Narbonne, both in France, have residential buildings; these two are among at least 45 inhabited bridges in Europe. Other covered bridges in Germany, the United States, and elsewhere might be seen as "buildings" in that their roof protects an enclosed area, but the purpose of the covering is to preserve the structure and the enclosed space is primarily for traffic to pass through. The term "covered bridges" is also used for structures in China such as Chengyang Bridge (1912) and Xijin Bridge (rebuilt 1718) which have large enclosed spaces, but for these it appears that space is not provided for commercial or residential use.

The term "covered bridge" is sometimes used broadly to describe any "bridge-like structure" that is covered by a roof. However, bridge-like structures such as Heilig-Geist-Spital, a hospital built out over two arched spans into the Pegnitz river in Nuremberg, but which did not ever provide a complete crossing to the other side, are not included, nor are certain other bridge-like structures that provide complete spans but are not open to the public for crossing.

Bridges having buildings (with significant commercial, residential, governmental, or religious worship space) include:

== Australia ==
Bridge	Image	Location	River	Dates	Note
Walter Taylor Bridge		Brisbane, Queensland27°30′21″S 152°58′25″E	Suspension bridge across Brisbane River	Opened 1936	Included residential space for "bridge-keeper" and family, no longer in use. Asserted to be the only habitable bridge in the southern hemisphere.

== Bulgaria ==
Bridge	Image	Location	River	Dates	Note
Covered Bridge, Lovech		Lovech			

== Canada ==
Bridge	Image	Location	River	Dates	Note
Esplanade Riel		Winnipeg, Manitoba; 49°31′57″N 97°04′25″E	Red River of the North	2004	Side-spar cable-stayed bridge with restaurant

== China ==
Bridge	Image	Location	River	Dates	Note
Anshun Bridge		Chengdu, Sichuan; 30°38′39″N 104°05′00″E	Jin River	13th century; 1746; 2003	Arch bridge with restaurant
Five-Pavilion Bridge		Yangzhou, Jiangsu; 32°24′35.1″N 119°24′58.1″E	Slender West Lake	1757	Arch bridge with pavilions

== Czech Republic ==
Bridge	Image	Location	River	Dates	Note
Stříbro bridge		Stříbro, Tachov District; 49°45′01″N 13°00′05″E	Crosses Mže River		One of five towers survives.
Cloak Bridge of Český Krumlov Castle		Český Krumlov			

== England ==
Bridge	Image	Location	River	Dates	Note
Frome bridge			River Frome	23 May 1983	
High Bridge, Lincoln		Lincoln, England; 53°13′42.7″N 0°32′26.4″W	River Witham	1160	The current row of timber framed shops on the west side of the bridge dates from about 1550.
"Old" London Bridge		51°30′29″N 0°05′16″W	Thames river, London	1209–1831	The number of houses on the bridge reached a maximum of 140. Many of the houses were later merged, into 91. In the seventeenth century, almost all had four or five storeys. All the houses were shops, and the bridge was one of the City of London's four or five main shopping streets. The three major buildings on the bridge were the chapel, the drawbridge tower and the stone gate. The drawbridge tower was where the severed heads of traitors were exhibited.
“Old” Newcastle Bridge		54.9674°N 1.6076°W	Tyne river, Newcastle	1248–1771	On the site of the current Newcastle Swing Bridge, the medieval bridge was swept away in the Great Flood of Newcastle in 1771.
Pulteney Bridge		Bath, Somerset; 51°22′58.9″N 2°21′28.4″W	River Avon, Bristol	Built 1769–1774	
Old Exe Bridge		Exeter, Devon; 50.719111°N 3.535800°W	River Exe (originally)	c.1200–1778	ruins are among England's oldest surviving bridge works
St Ives Bridge		St Ives, Cambridgeshire; 52.322826°N 0.075338°W	Great Ouse in St Ives, Cambridgeshire	1400s	One of four bridges in England having a chapel. Chapel space was a bawdy house in 1700s.
Rotherham Bridge		Rotherham; 53°25′57″N 1°21′30″W			One of four bridges in England having a chapel
Chantry Bridge, or Wakefield Bridge		Wakefield; 53°40′34″N 1°29′20″W		14th-century, nine-arched, stone bridge	One of four bridges in England having a chapel
Town Bridge, Bradford-on-Avon		Bradford-on-Avon; 51°20′49″N 2°15′04″W			One of four bridges in England having a chapel Has a lock-up.

== France ==
"Between 12th and 16th century many bridges were built with houses on them. They were solution for limited accommodation in walled cities and only France had as many as 35."

Ponts Couverts, Strasbourg, a covered bridge in Strasbourg, has four massive towers that are buildings, but these are on islands not the bridge itself. (See File:Panorama de Strasbourg - 2014-02-02- P1760351 - P1760357.jpg)

Bridge	Image	Location	River	Dates	Note
Pont d'Avignon, or Pont Saint-Bénézet		Avignon; 43°57′14″N 4°48′18″E	Rhône	Built 1177–1185	Has Chapel of Saint Nicholas
Pont Valentré		Cahors; 44°26′42″N 1°25′54″E	Arch bridge with six 16.5 metres (54 ft) spans, crosses Lot	Built 1308–1378	
Château de Chenonceau		Loire Valley; 47°19′29″N 1°04′13″E	Cher	1514–1559	
Pont des Marchands		Narbonne, Aude; 43.183201°N 3.003693°E	Canal de la Robine		Segmental arch bridge with one (once six) span
Pont de Rohan		Landerneau, Brittany; 48.450260°N 4.249286°W	Crosses the Élorn until 1930 and the construction of the Pont Albert Louppe near Brest.		
Barrage Vauban		Strasbourg; 48°34′46″N 7°44′17″E	120 m (390 ft) bridge crosses Ill	Opened in 1690	
Pont Ambroix		Ambrussum, Languedoc-Roussillon; 43.7172°N 4.1519°E	Stone arch bridge which carried the Roman road Via Domitia across the Vidourle; only one of its 11 arches survives;	1st century BC. During the High Middle Ages, a chapel devoted to St Mary was added.	

== Germany ==
Bridge	Image	Location	River	Dates	Note
Krämerbrücke		Erfurt, Thuringia; 50°58′43″N 11°01′51″E	segmental stone arch bridge crosses Gera 125 metres (410 ft) x 26 metres (85 ft)	1325 (stone bridge); 1486 (houses)	
Alte Nahebrücke (Bad Kreuznach)		Bad Kreuznach, Rhineland-Palatinate; 49°50′41″N 07°51′28″E	Nahe river	c. 1300/1956 (bridge); 1612 (houses)	Stone arch bridge, 135 metres (443 ft) x 10 metres (33 ft)
Stadtbrille		Amberg, Bavaria; 49.442822°N 11.857381°E	Vils		The "Stadtbrille" (literally: town spectacles) bridge was part of the town's fortifications, and its arches reflected on the river resemble a pair of spectacles.
Innere Brücke		Esslingen am Neckar, Baden-Württemberg; 48°44′00″N 09°19′00″E	Neckar		

== Italy ==
Bridge	Image	Location	River	Dates	Note
Ponte Vecchio, Florence		Florence; 43°46′05″N 11°15′11″E	Crosses Arno River		Closed-spandrel segmental stone arch bridge with 30 metres (98 ft) main span
Rialto Bridge		Venice	Stone arch bridge with 31.80 metres (104.3 ft) span over Grand Canal		22.90 metres (75.1 ft) wide
Ponte Coperto		Pavia; 45.180739°N 9.153258°E	Crosses Ticino River		216 metres (709 ft) long. Bridge of 1354 and 1949-51 replacement have a chapel.
Ponte Vecchio, Bassano		Bassano del Grappa	Crosses Brenta (river)		

== Spain ==
Bridge	Image	Location	River	Dates	Note
Puente Nuevo		Ronda; 36°44′26.69″N 5°9′57.25″W	Crosses Guadalevín River in El Tajo gorge.	Built 1759–1793	Chamber above central arch has been used as a prison, including during Spanish Civil War

== Switzerland ==
Bridge	Image	Location	River	Dates	Note
Spreuerbrücke		Lucerne; 47°03′07.1″N 8°18′06.5″E	crosses Reuss		

== Turkey ==
Bridge	Image	Location	River	Dates	Note
Irgandı Bridge		Bursa; 40°10′54″N 29°04′16″E	crosses Gökdere		
Constantine's Bridge		Mysia; 40°12′15″N 28°26′29″E		completed after 258 AD	Only ruins remain. Crossed Rhyndacus (Adırnas Çayı) In Byzantine times, had chapel created by Helena, mother of Constantine I

== United States ==
Bridge	Image	Location	River	Dates	Note
Main Street Bridge		Rochester, New York; 43°9′22″N 77°36′39″W	Genesee River	1857	The buildings were removed in the mid-1960's. Earlier bridges at this site also had buildings.

== Vietnam ==
Bridge	Image	Location	River	Dates	Note
Chùa Cầu, or Japanese Bridge		Hội An, Quảng Nam; 15°52′38″N 108°19′34″E			Has a small temple, Bac De Tran Vu, which worships a Chinese general, also known as Huyen Thien Dai De.

== Wales ==
Bridge	Image	Location	River	Dates	Note
Monnow Bridge		Monmouth, Wales; 51°48′32″N 2°43′12″W	River Monnow	c.1272	A central tower, variously used as a gaol, garrison, toll-house and museum. The only surviving such bridge-tower in Britain.

== See also ==
- Bridge castle
- List of lists of covered bridges in North America
