= Japanese Bridge =

Bridge in Vietnam

Japanese Bridge Chùa Cầu, Cầu Nhật Bản
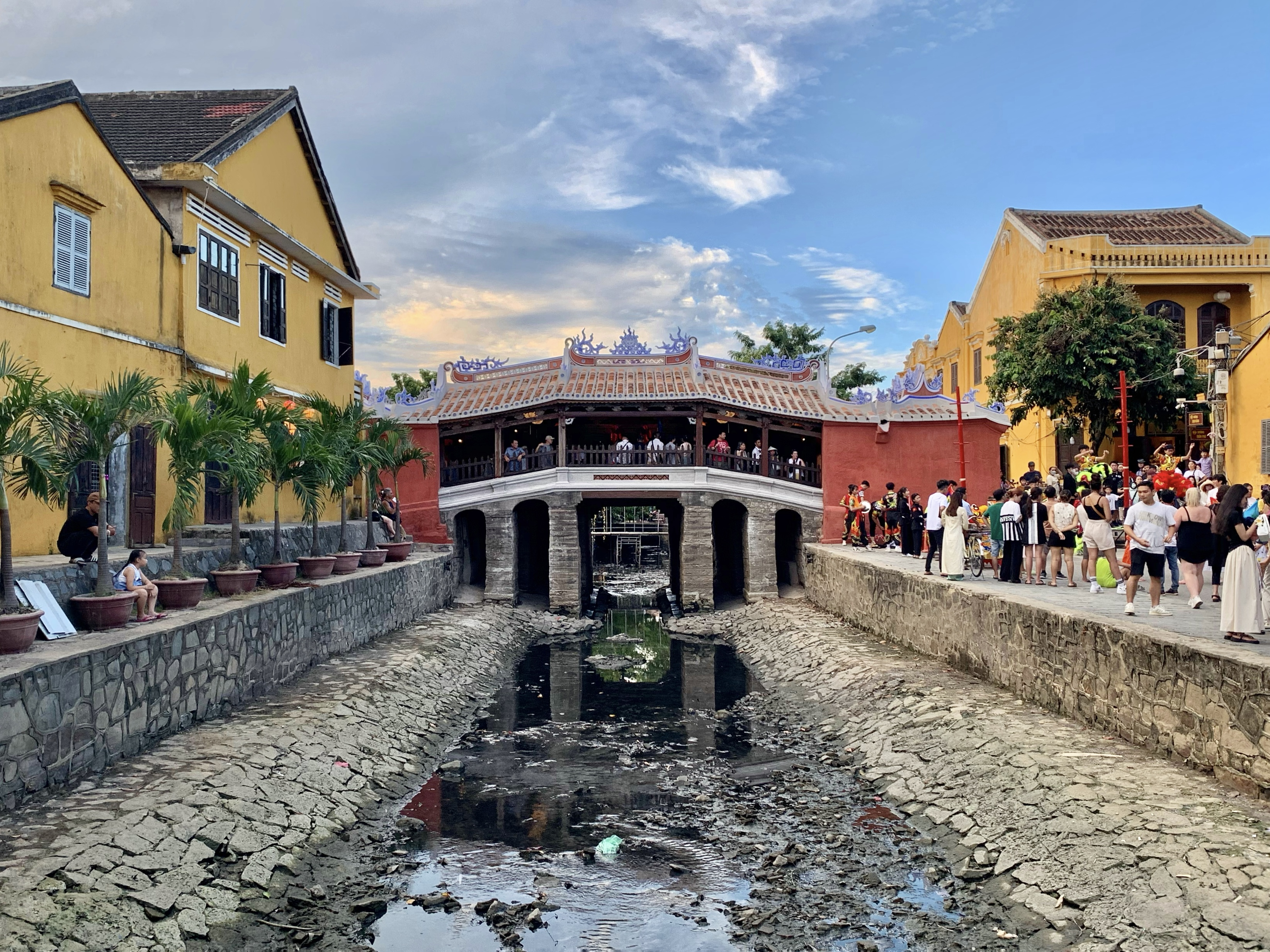
- The Japanese Bridge in 2024
- Coordinates: 15°52′37″N 108°19′34″E
- Carries: pedestrians
- Crosses: Outlet of Thu Bồn River
- Locale: Hoi An, Vietnam
- Official name: Lai Viễn Kiều
- Other name: Pagoda Bridge

Characteristics
- Design: Covered bridge
- Longest span: 18 metres (59 ft)

History
- Opened: 1593

Location
- Interactive map of Japanese Bridge

Chùa Cầu
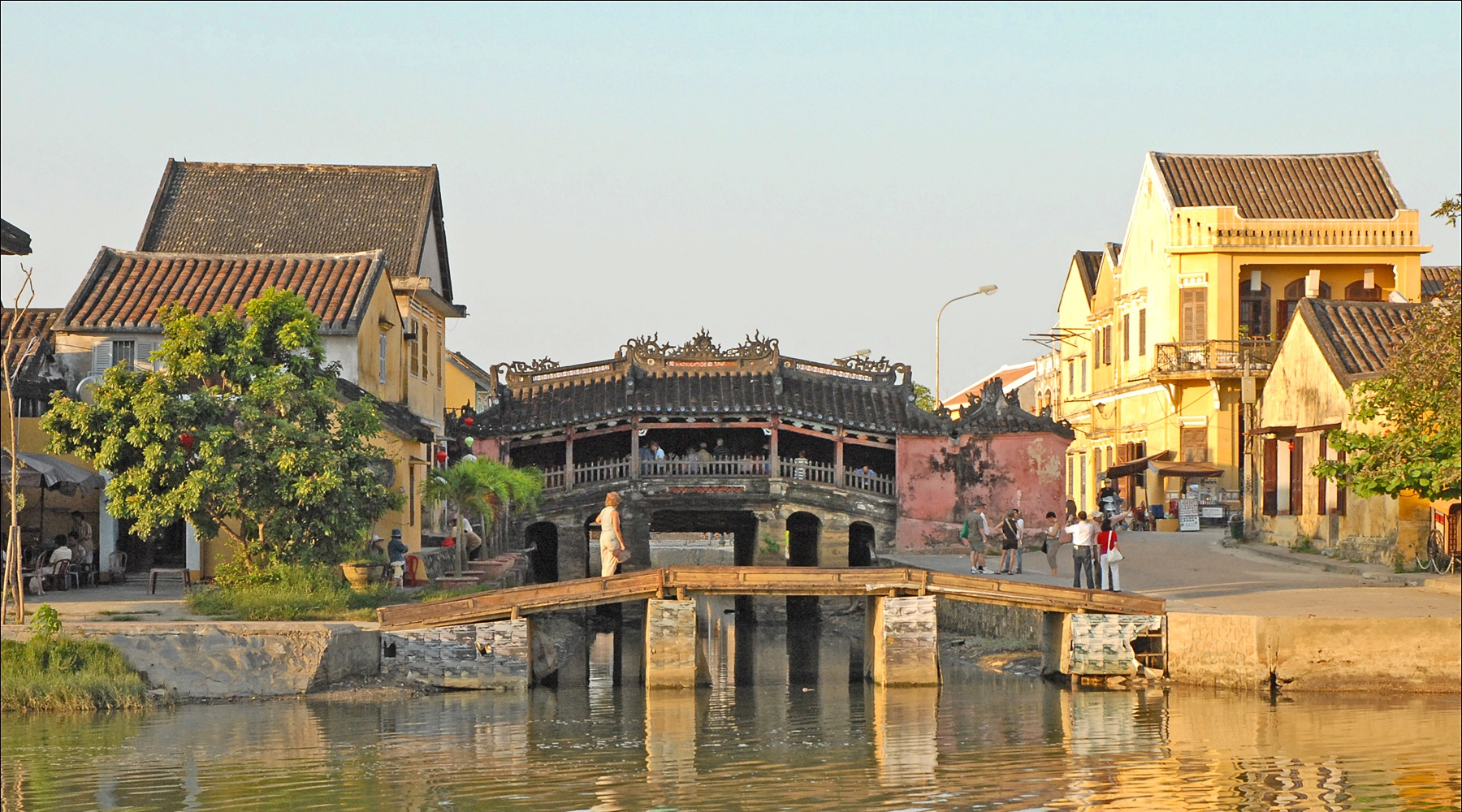
- The bridge and temple in 2010

Religion
- Affiliation: Taoist
- Ecclesiastical or organizational status: Temple
- Patron: Trấn Vũ
- Year consecrated: 1653

Location
- Location: Hoi An, Vietnam
- Interactive map of Chùa Cầu

Architecture
- Style: Japanese Edo (original)

The Japanese Bridge (Vietnamese: Chùa Cầu, lit. Buddhist Temple Bridge) is a footbridge with a temple atop, located in Hội An, Da Nang, Vietnam. It dates from the late 16th century by Japanese merchantmen but successive renovations and repairs on the bridge have occurred throughout the period to the modern day.

== Description ==
The footbridge is 18 meters long and 3 meters wide. A small temple sits on the north end of the bridge, with the entrance in middle of the bridge overlooking the water. The two bridgeheads are built with bricks with two spans each, while the middle portion of the bridge has five spans placed on brick pillars going into the water. The building frame is made of wood and utilizes three separate, but integrated roof systems for the three portions of the bridge.

The bridge's temple has ornate decor, including porcelain bowls used to cap the ends of the roof tiles and statues of a monkey and a dog (the monkey god and the dog god are the two gods who control Namazu in Japanese folklore). Chữ Hán can be found throughout the bridge and temple, including "Lai Viễn Kiều" in front of the entrance of the temple. The temple historically has been an altar to Trấn Vũ with an annual festival dedicated to the deity on the 20th day of the 7th lunar month.

== History ==
During the 16th century, Japanese merchants began to establish residence in the port city of Faifo (now Hoi An) and established their own enclave. In 1593, one group of merchants began building a covered bridge to cross a neighborhood canal. They finished construction in 1595 and improved access between the Chinese enclave on the other side. In 1653, Japanese residents built a temple atop the bridge as a way to, according to legend, placate the earthquake-inducing monster Namazu. With the 17th century withdrawals of Japanese merchants and Dutch East Indies company from Hoi An, Chùa Cầu and its surrounding neighborhood remained relatively preserved.

During a 1719 visit to Hoi An, lord Nguyễn Phúc Chu named the bridge Lai Viễn Kiều, which means "a bridge to welcome guests from afar". According to a date recorded on the roof beam and an inscription left at the bridgehead, the bridge was rebuilt in 1817, though it is not clear if the temple was as well. The bridge would be renovated in 1817, 1865, 1915, and 1986, gradually integrating elements of Vietnamese and Chinese architecture and design in lieu of its original Japanese elements.

As the structure is sinking due to underground erosion, works are undergoing to prevent its collapse.

== Honors and designation ==
In February 1990, Chùa Cầu was granted the status of National Historic-Cultural Relic. In 2006, a 20,000 VND banknote was released featuring the bridge.

== Gallery ==
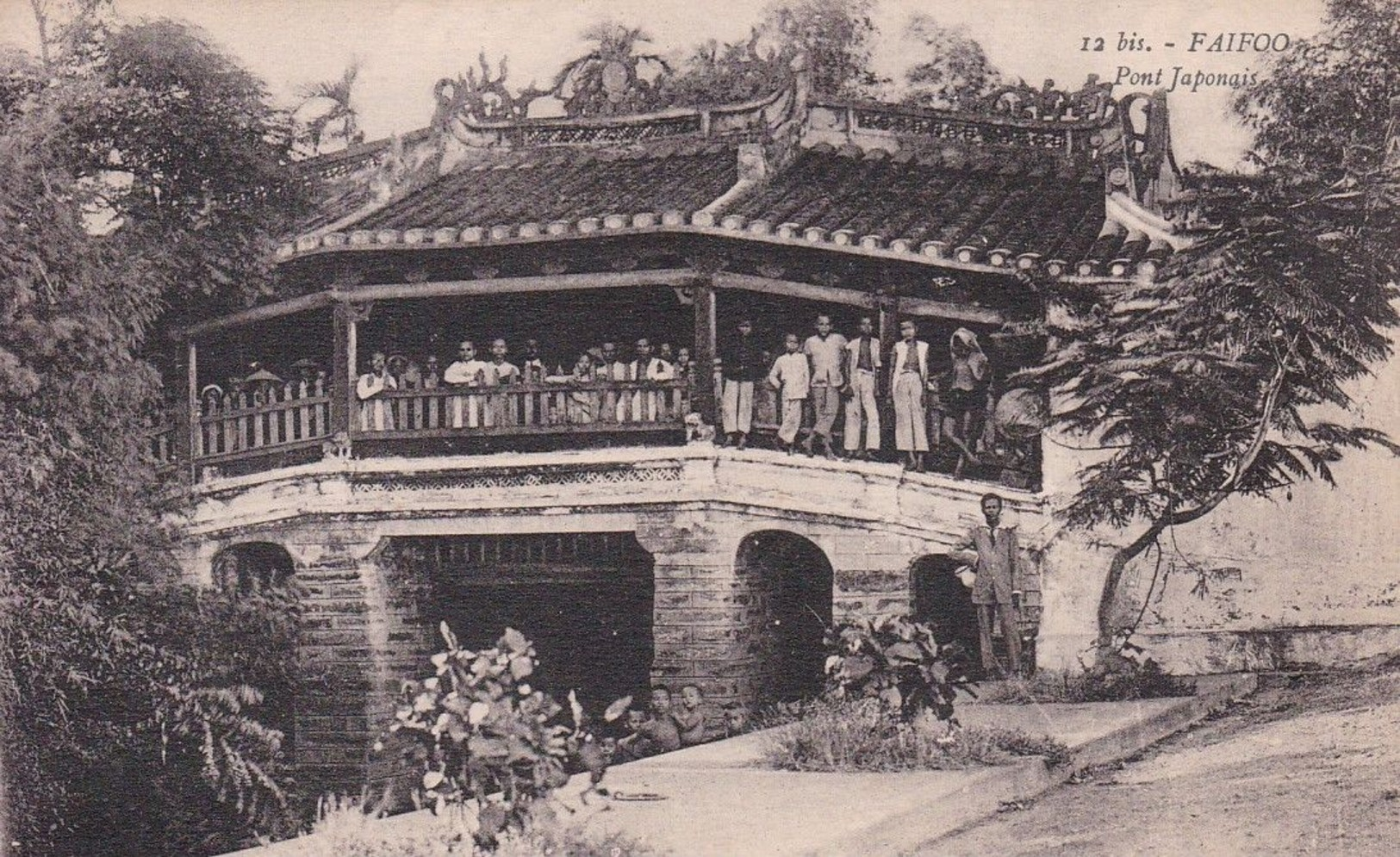
Japanese Bridge on a postcard in early 20th century

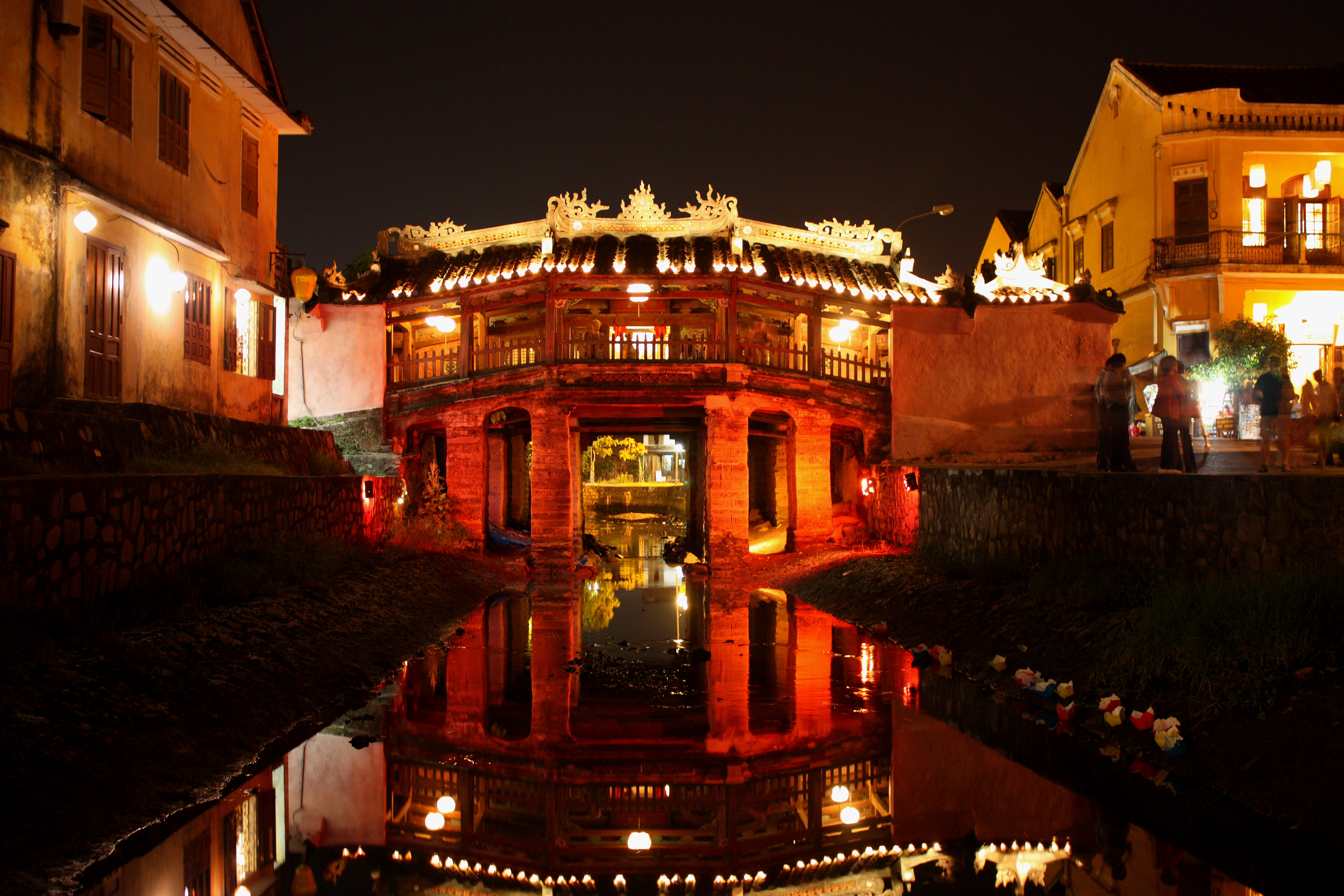
The bridge being lit up at night in 2013

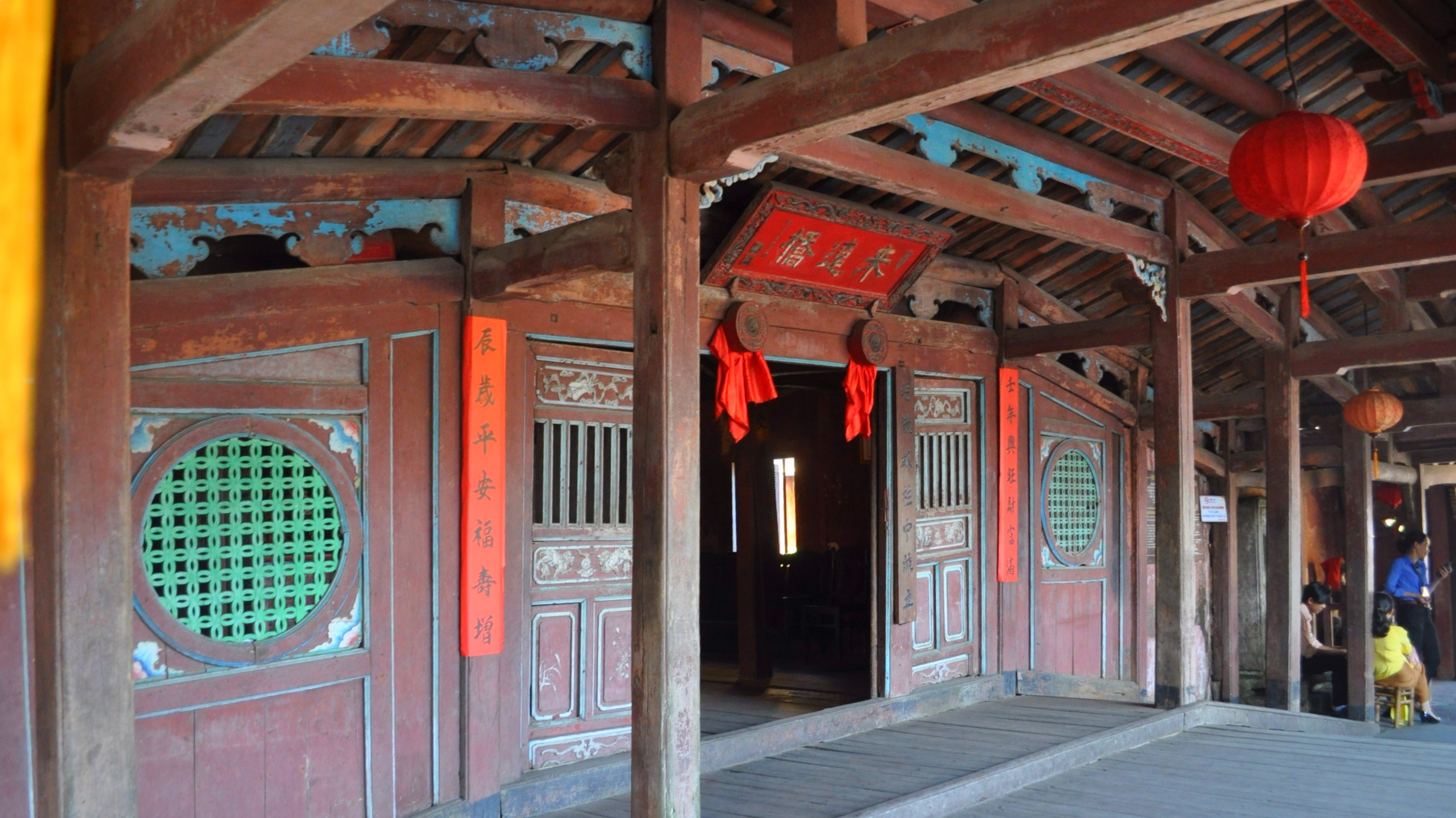
The temple in 2012

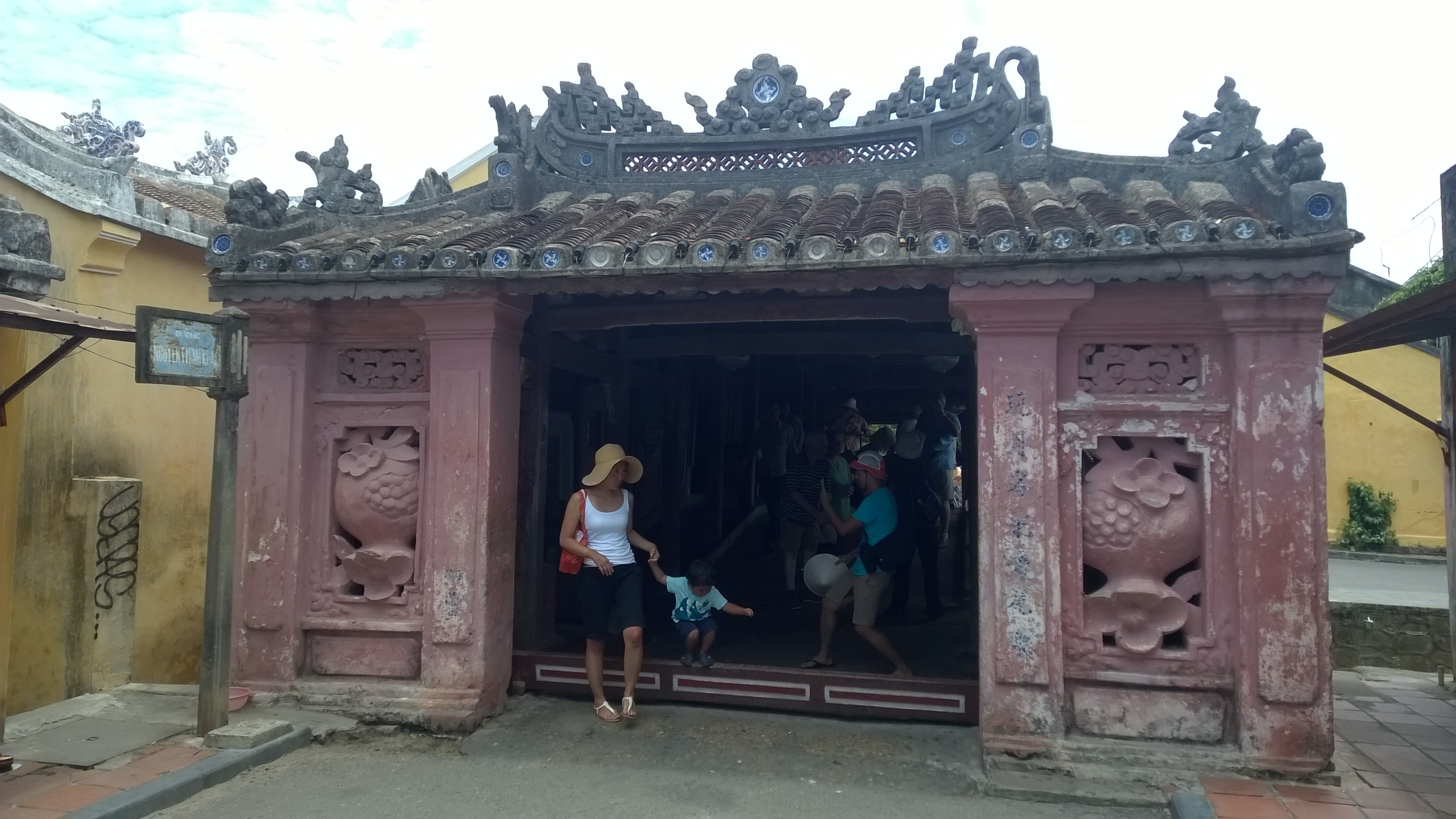
Entrance to the bridge

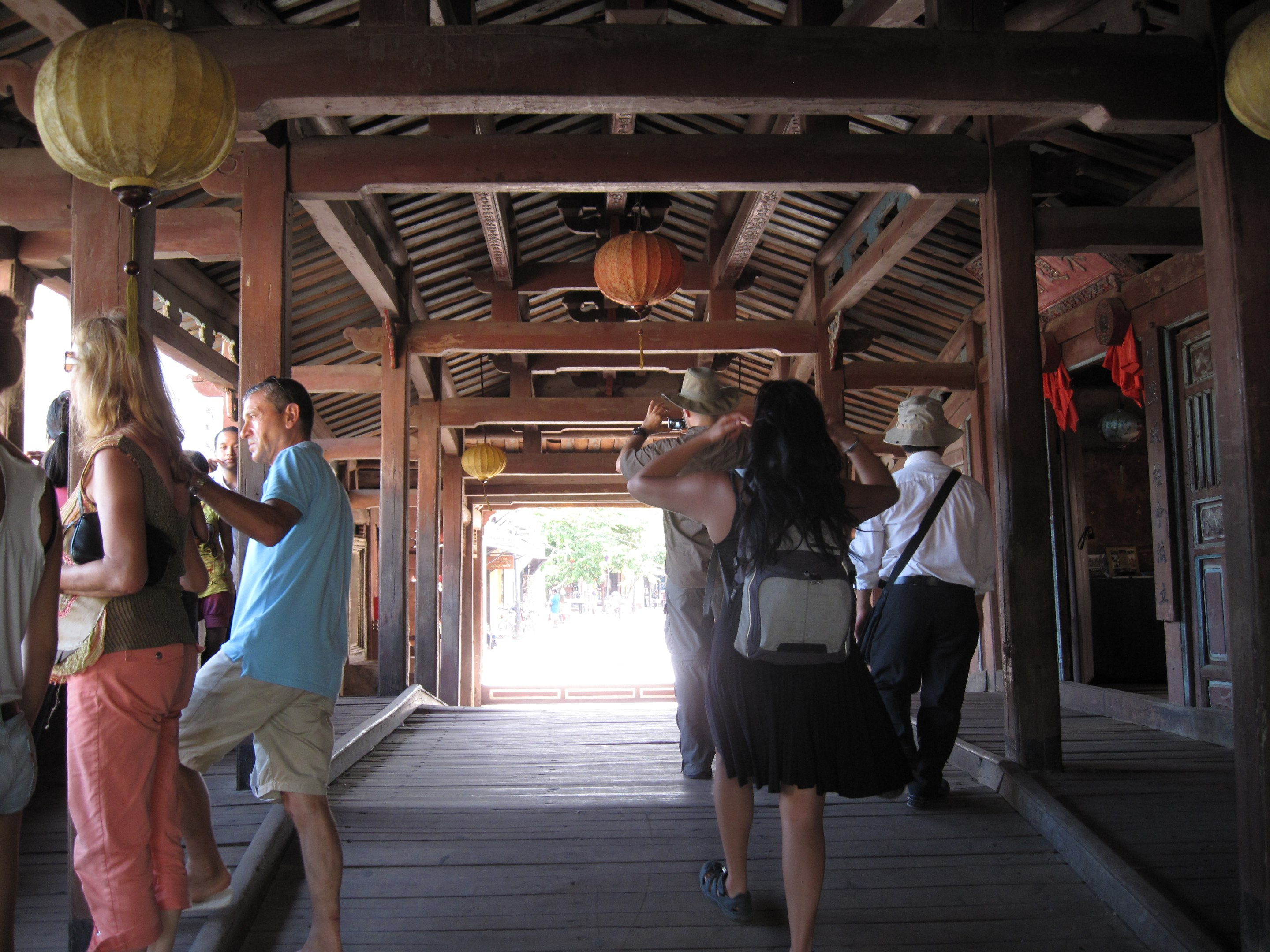
Interior of the bridge

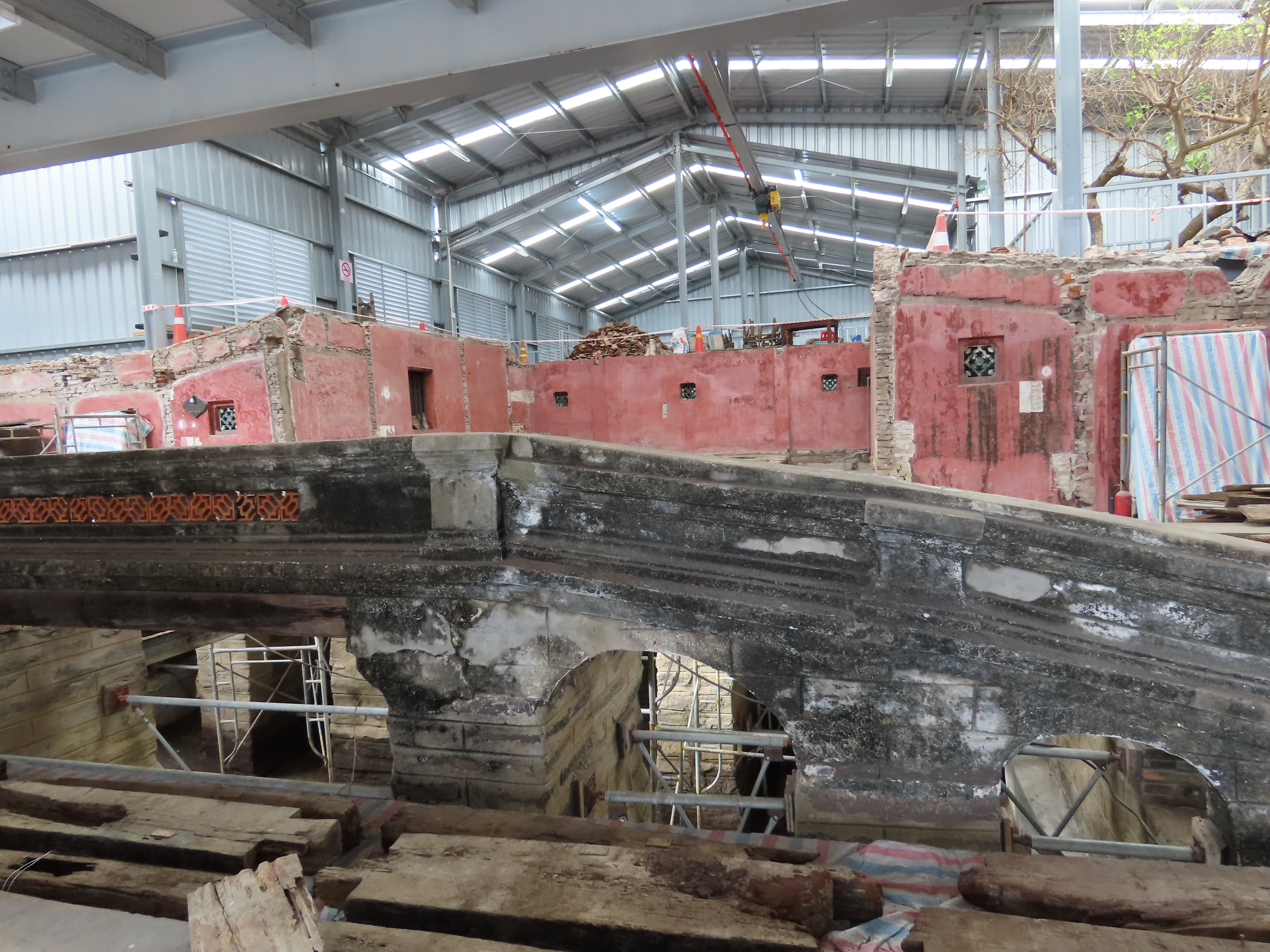
The Japanese Bridge dismantled for restoration as of October 2023

== See also ==
- List of bridges with buildings
