= Irgandı Bridge =

Irgandı Bridge Irgandı Köprüsü
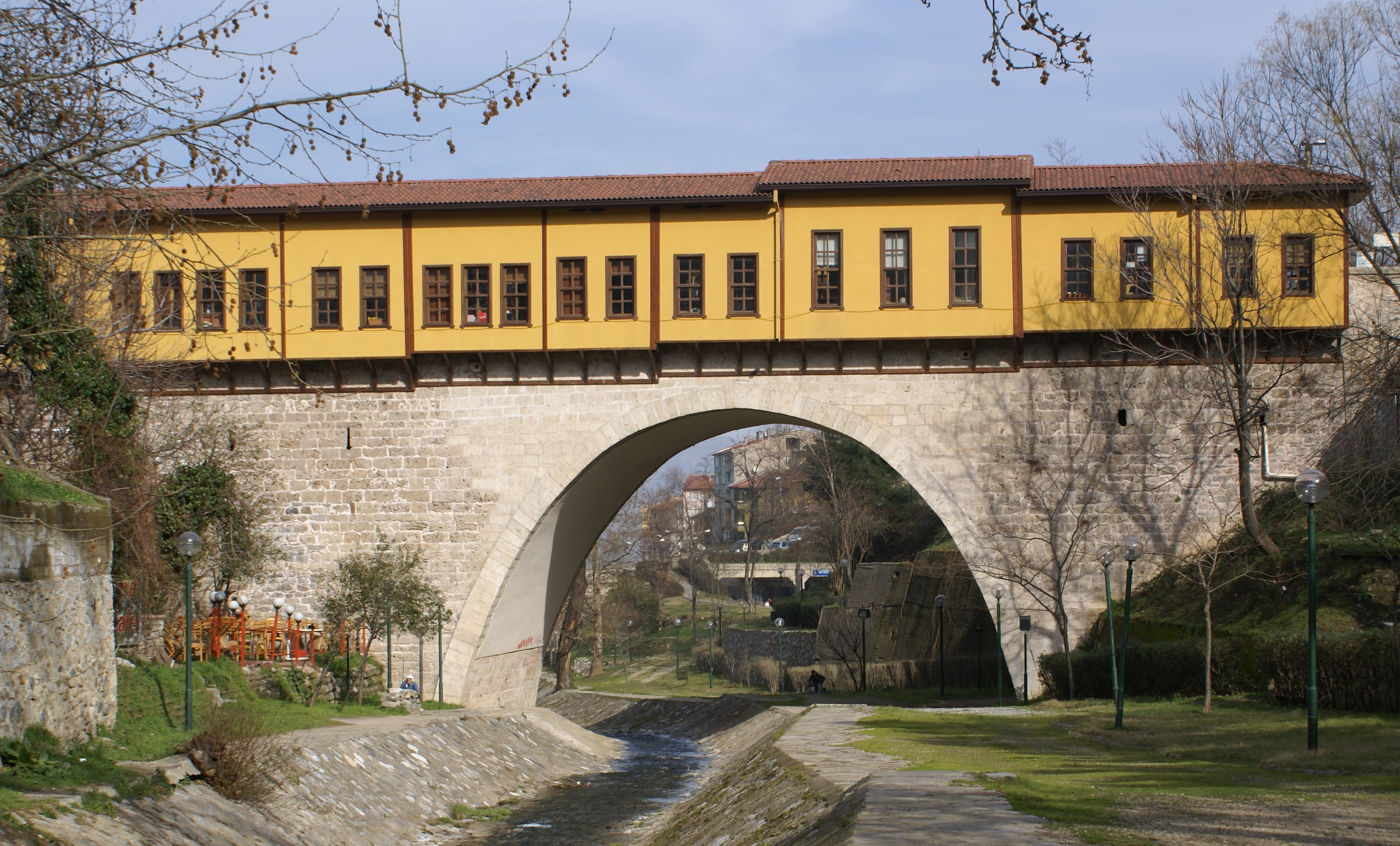
- Irgandı bridge in Bursa, Turkey
- Coordinates: 40.1818°N 29.0710°E
- Crosses: Gökdere
- Locale: Bursa, Turkey

Characteristics
- Design: Arch bridge
- Material: Stone
- Width: 11 m (36 ft)

History
- Architect: Timurtaş
- Construction end: 1442

Location
- Interactive map of Irgandı Bridge

Irgandı Bridge (Turkish: Irgandı Köprüsü) is a historical bridge in Bursa, Turkey. The bridge is over Gökdere, a tributary of Nilüfer River. It is between Osmangazi (northwest) and Yıldırım (southeast), two second level municipalities of Greater Bursa. The bridge is the only bazaar-bridge that was built in the Ottoman Empire.

== History ==
The bridge was commissioned by Müslihiddin, a merchant, in 1442, and it was likely designed by Timurtaş. It was damaged in the 1855 Bursa earthquake. In 1922, during the Turkish War of Independence, it was bombed by the Hellenic Army, retreating from its occupation of Bursa. It remained closed to traffic until it was reconstructed, with minor modifications, in 1949. Another restoration took place in 2004.

== Details ==
The bridge is a single arc bridge. Arch span is 16 metres (52 ft) and the width is 11 metres (36 ft). It is an example of a rare type of covered bridge which houses a bazaar. It has been claimed (incorrectly) locally that it is one of only four bridges in the world having shops. Other bridges with shops on them are Ponte Vecchio and Ponte Rialto in Italy; Osam Bridge in Bulgaria; Pulteney Bridge in Avon, High Bridge in Lincoln, and "Frome Bridge" in Frome in the United Kingdom; and Krämerbrücke in Erfurt, Germany. In the original design there were thirty shops on the bridge. According to Ass. Prof Önge during the Ottoman times, the bridge was also used to check traffic between two neighborhoods of Bursa by closing during the nights.
