= Pont des Marchands =

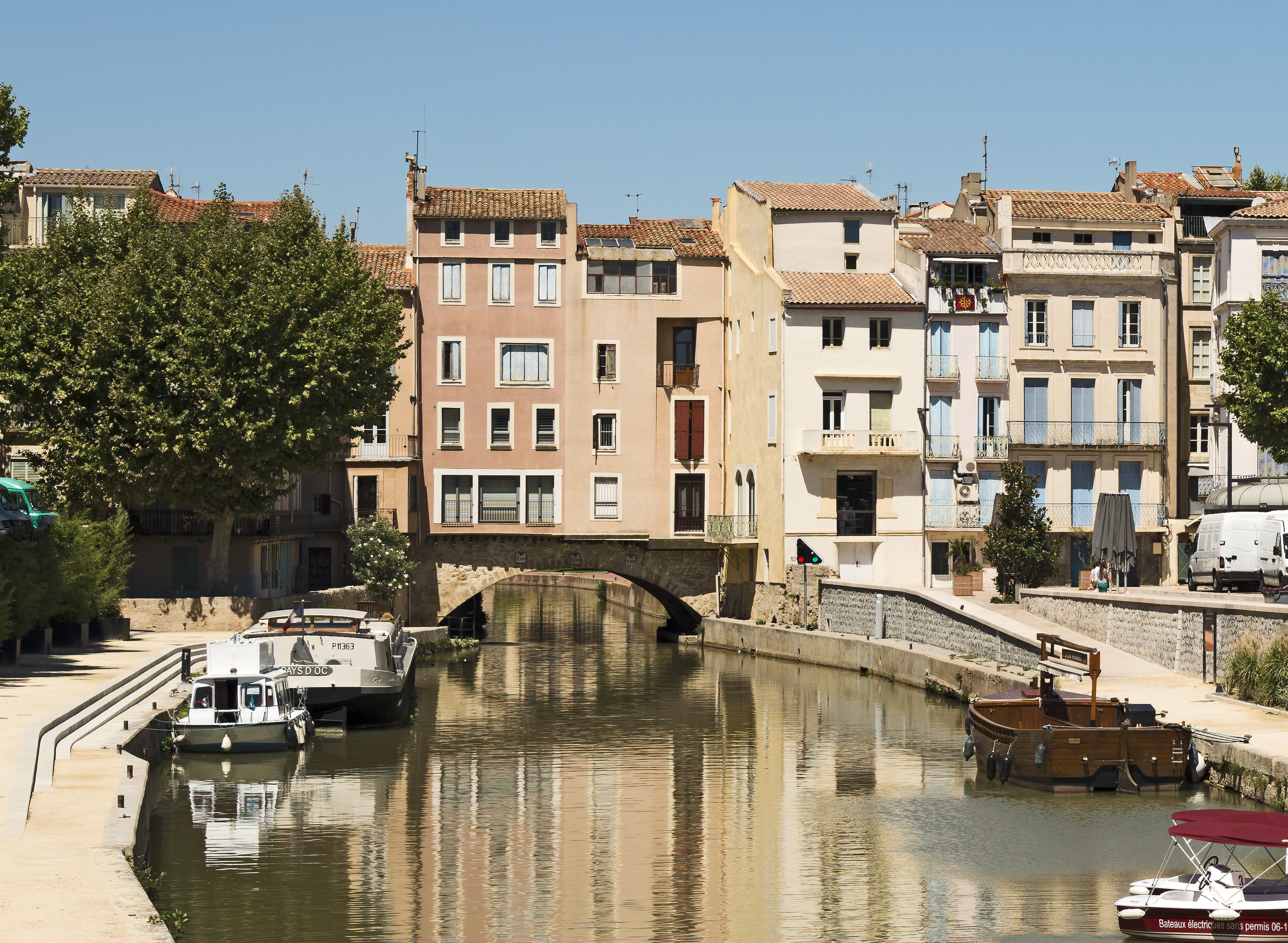
- Pont des Marchands today
- Coordinates: 43.183201°N 3.003693°E
- Crosses: Canal de la Robine
- Locale: Narbonne, Aude, France

Characteristics
- Design: Segmental arch bridge
- Longest span: Ca. 15 m (49.2 ft)
- No. of spans: 1 (once 6)

Location
- Interactive map of Pont des Marchands

The Pont des Marchands (English: Merchants' Bridge) is a historic bridge in Narbonne, southern France. It serves as a foundation for a row of houses and shops underneath which the Canal de la Robine runs through the old town. Its segmental arch has a span of ca. 15 m. In Roman times the structure featured as many as six arches.

It is one of only a handful of bridges worldwide that are lined with shops.

== See also ==
- Roman bridge
- List of Roman bridges
- List of medieval bridges in France
- Alte Nahebrücke
- High Bridge, Lincoln

== Sources ==
- O’Connor, Colin (1993), Roman Bridges, Cambridge University Press, p. 99 (G13), ISBN 0-521-39326-4
