= Ponte Coperto =

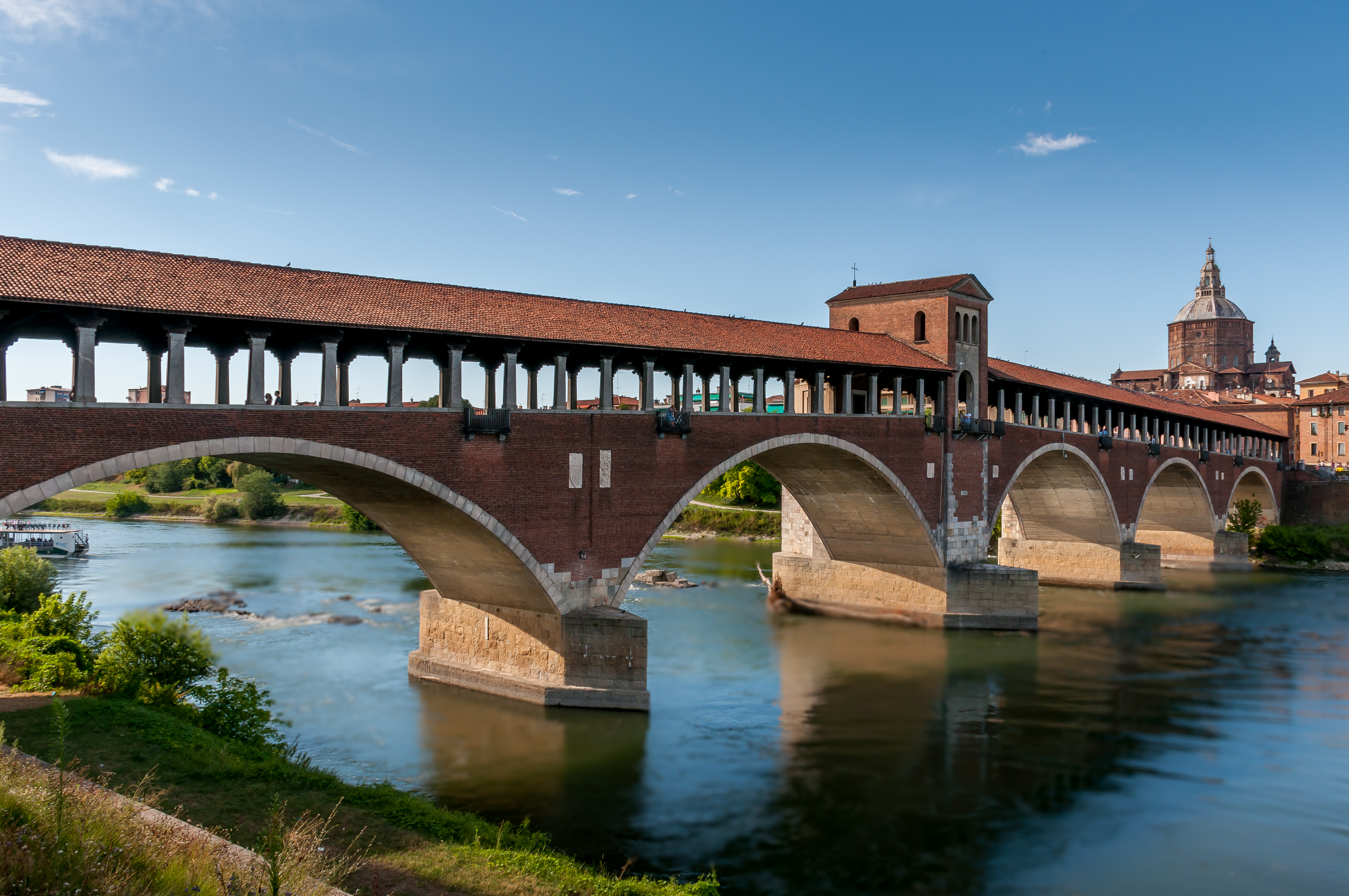
- Coordinates: 45.180739°N 9.153258°E
- Crosses: Ticino
- Locale: Pavia, Italy

Characteristics
- Design: stone and brick deck arch bridge
- Total length: 216 metres (709 ft)

History
- Construction start: 1949
- Construction end: 1951

The Ponte Coperto ("Covered Bridge") or the Ponte Vecchio ("Old Bridge") is a stone and brick arch bridge over the river Ticino in Pavia, Italy.

The previous bridge, dating from 1354 (itself a replacement for a Roman construction), was heavily damaged by Allied action in 1945. A debate on whether to fix or replace the bridge ended when the bridge partially collapsed in 1947, requiring new construction, which began in 1949. The new bridge is based on the previous one, which had seven arches to the current bridge's five.

The current bridge, like its predecessor, bears a chapel. The Ponte Coperto was, until the nineteenth century, the only brick bridge over the Ticino from Lake Maggiore to its confluence with the Po.

== History ==
=== Roman bridge ===
In pre-Roman times, Ticino flowed into the Po valley below the point where the bridge now stands. At the confluence of the two rivers, in territory then controlled by populations of the Golasecca culture, around 600 BC, according to Livy, the Celtic prince Bellovesus defeated the Etruscans and, after settling on this territory with his people, then founded, further north, the city of Milan.

In 218 BC, when the meeting point between Ticino and Po had moved downstream several kilometers, the Romans, led by Publius Cornelius Scipio, threw a bridge over the Ticino where now stands Pavia, which they destroyed after the defeat, suffered by Hannibal, in the battle of Ticinus.

In Roman times, in the ancient town of Ticinum, there already was a bridge which connected the two shores of the river Ticino in the same location as the contemporary Ponte Coperto. The base of one of the central piers is still visible nowadays when there are low water levels. The orientation of the pier is proof that in Roman age the direction of the current of the river was different. It is believed that the Roman bridge was built during the Augustan age.

=== Legend ===
According to the legend, in 999, on Christmas Eve, a few pilgrims wanted to attend the midnight mass in town but, because of the thick fog, their boats could not cross the river. Suddenly, a man in red clothes arrived, and he promised that he would immediately build a bridge in exchange of the first soul crossing the bridge. The man in red was the devil, and he was recognised only by the Archangel Michael, who had arrived from the church nearby. Michael pretended to accept the deal but, once the bridge was built, a goat crossed it first. The bridge therefore also became known as Ponte del Diavolo ('Devil's Bridge').

=== 14th-century bridge ===
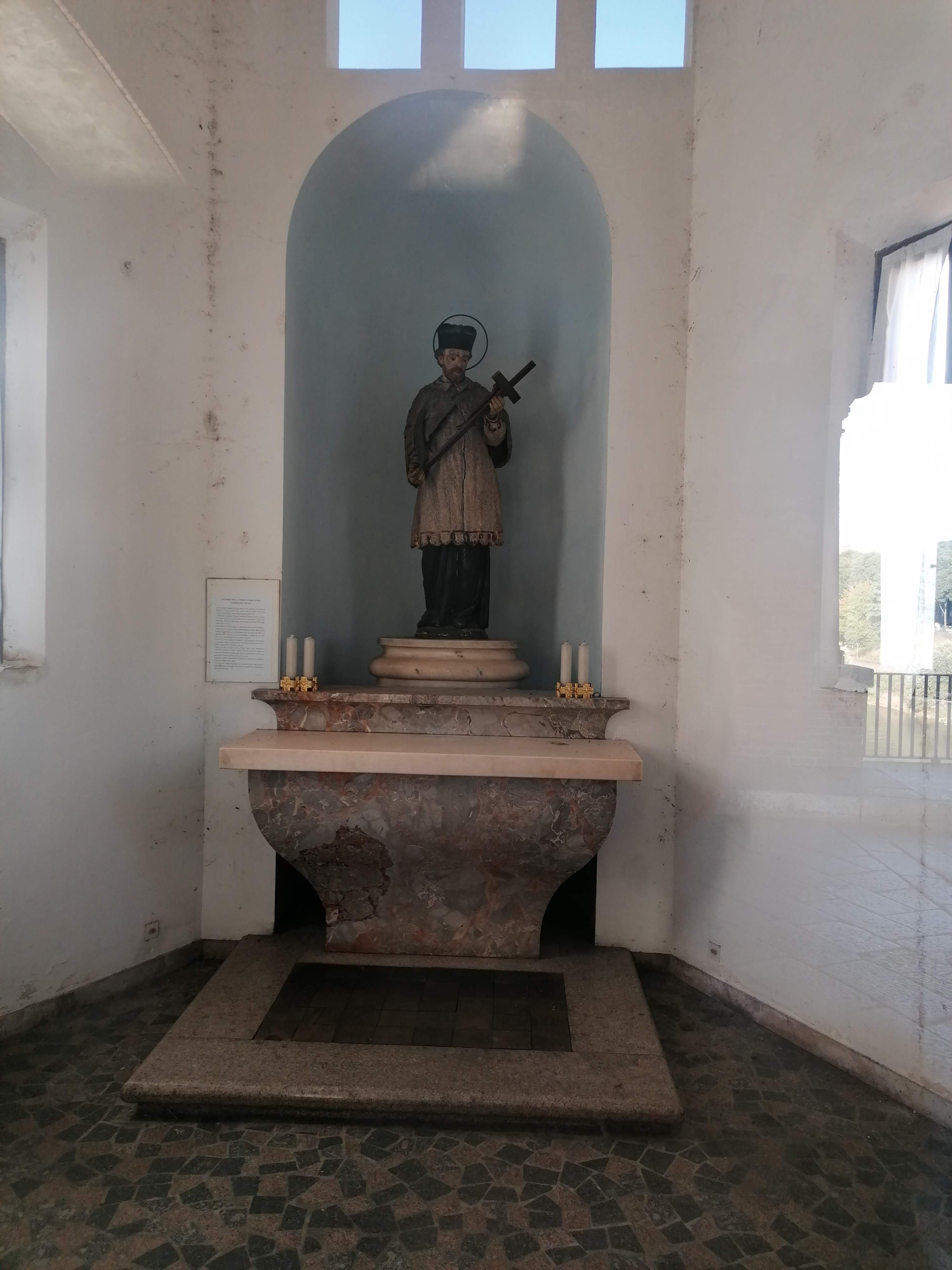
Interiors of the chapel with the 18th-century statue of Saint John of Nepomuk which survived the bombings during Second World War.

The Roman bridge continued to function even at the beginning of the Middle Ages and was restored in 860 by Emperor Louis the German, who ordered the vassals dependent on the Abbey of Bobbio to come to Pavia to participate in the works. In the Middle Ages (then in modern times, until the advent of the railway), the bridge was very important because it was a nodal point at the intersection of two fundamental trade routes for the entire Po Valley: the river route, through which it was possible to reach the Adriatic and Venice and the "Lombardy" route which, crossing the covered bridge, connected Genoa with Milan. A new bridge was rebuilt in 1351 on the ruins of the Roman bridge, following the project of Giovanni da Ferrara and Jacopo da Cozzo. The bridge was completed in 1354: it was covered and it had ten irregular arches and two towers at its ends, used for defence. The appearance of this bridge, although with only six arches, can be observed in Bernardino Lanzani's frescoes (around 1524) in Saint Theodore's Church. During the construction of the Spanish walls, in the 17th century, the first arch and a half on the city's side, and the first arch on the Borgo side were incorporated in the bastions and therefore closed. Subsequently, new elements were added: a portal of entry on Borgo Ticino's side (1599), a chapel in the centre of the bridge in honour of Saint John of Nepomuk (1746), and lastly a portal of entry, built by Carlo Armati (1822), on the side of the historic centre. In the registry office in Mezzabarba Palace, seat of the municipality of Pavia, a wooden model of the 14th-century bridge, built in 1938, is displayed.

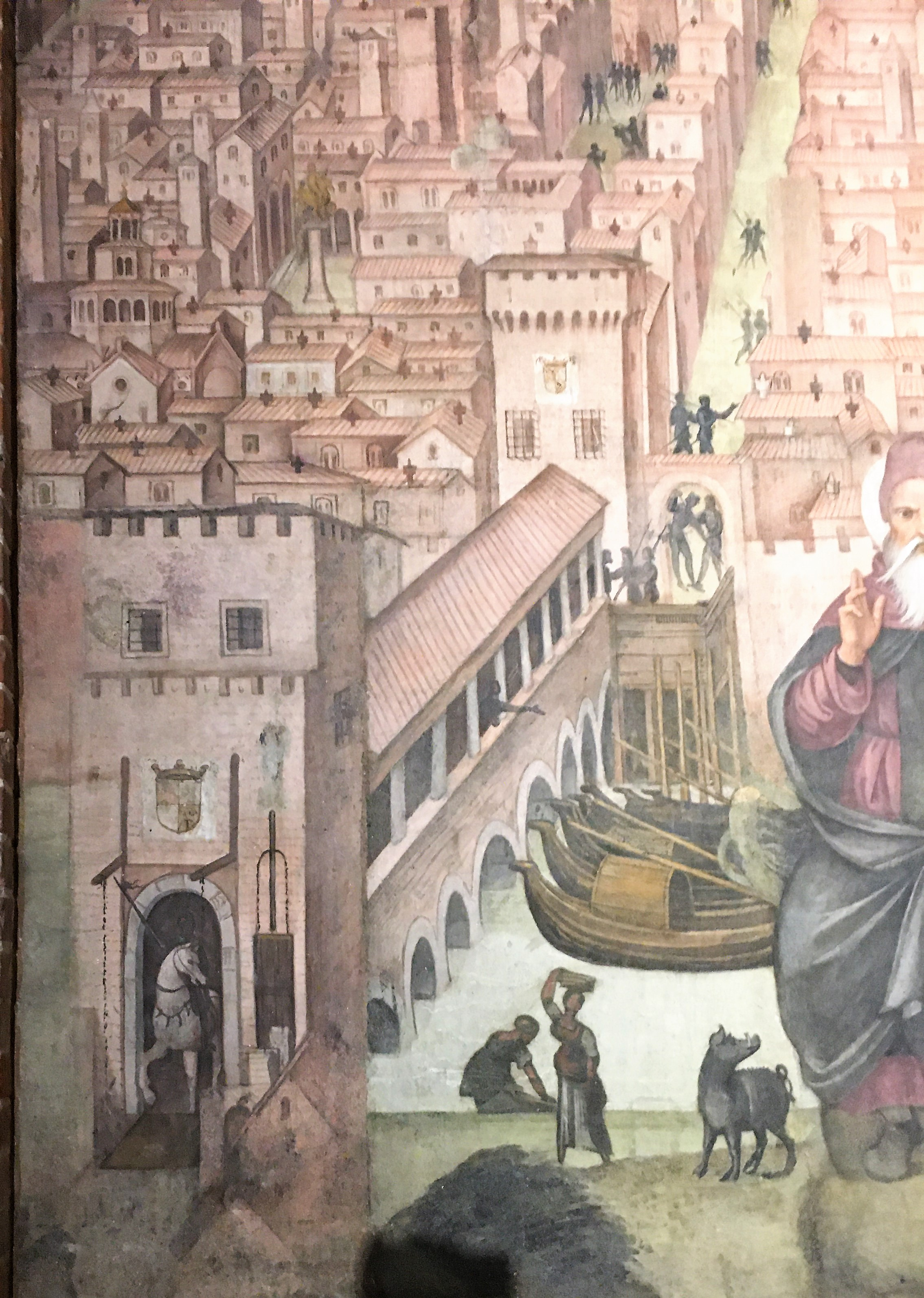
How the bridge was originally supposed to appear, Bernardino Lanzani, Sant'Antonio Abate protects Pavia during the siege of 1522, Pavia, Church of San Teodoro

The Allied bombings in September 1944 during the Second World War damaged the ancient bridge and destroyed one of its arches. At the end of the war, a debate was opened over the opportunity to fix the old bridge or to demolish it. Due to the fear that any collapse of the bridge could have caused a flood, in February 1948 the Ministry of Public Works ordered the demolition of the ancient artifact.

A few remains of the piers of the ancient bridge are still visible in the waters of the river.

=== 20th-century bridge ===
The construction of the new bridge began in 1949, and its inauguration took place in 1951. An epigraph was placed on the portal of entry on the city's side with the words: Sull'antico varco del ceruleo Ticino, ad immagine del vetusto Ponte Coperto, demolito dalla furia della guerra, la Repubblica Italiana riedificò ('On the ancient passage of the cerulean river Ticino, in the likeness of the old Ponte Coperto, demolished by the war, the Italian Republic rebuilt').

The bridge was built around 30 metres (98 ft) further downstream than the previous one, larger and higher. The arches are larger, therefore fewer (five instead of seven). The bridge is also shorter, as it is positioned exactly perpendicular to the river's current. The old one instead followed the line which links Strada Nuova (in the city centre) and Piazzale Ghinaglia (in Borgo Ticino). The changes in the project were aimed at improving the road conditions on the bridge and facilitating the flows of the water of the river.

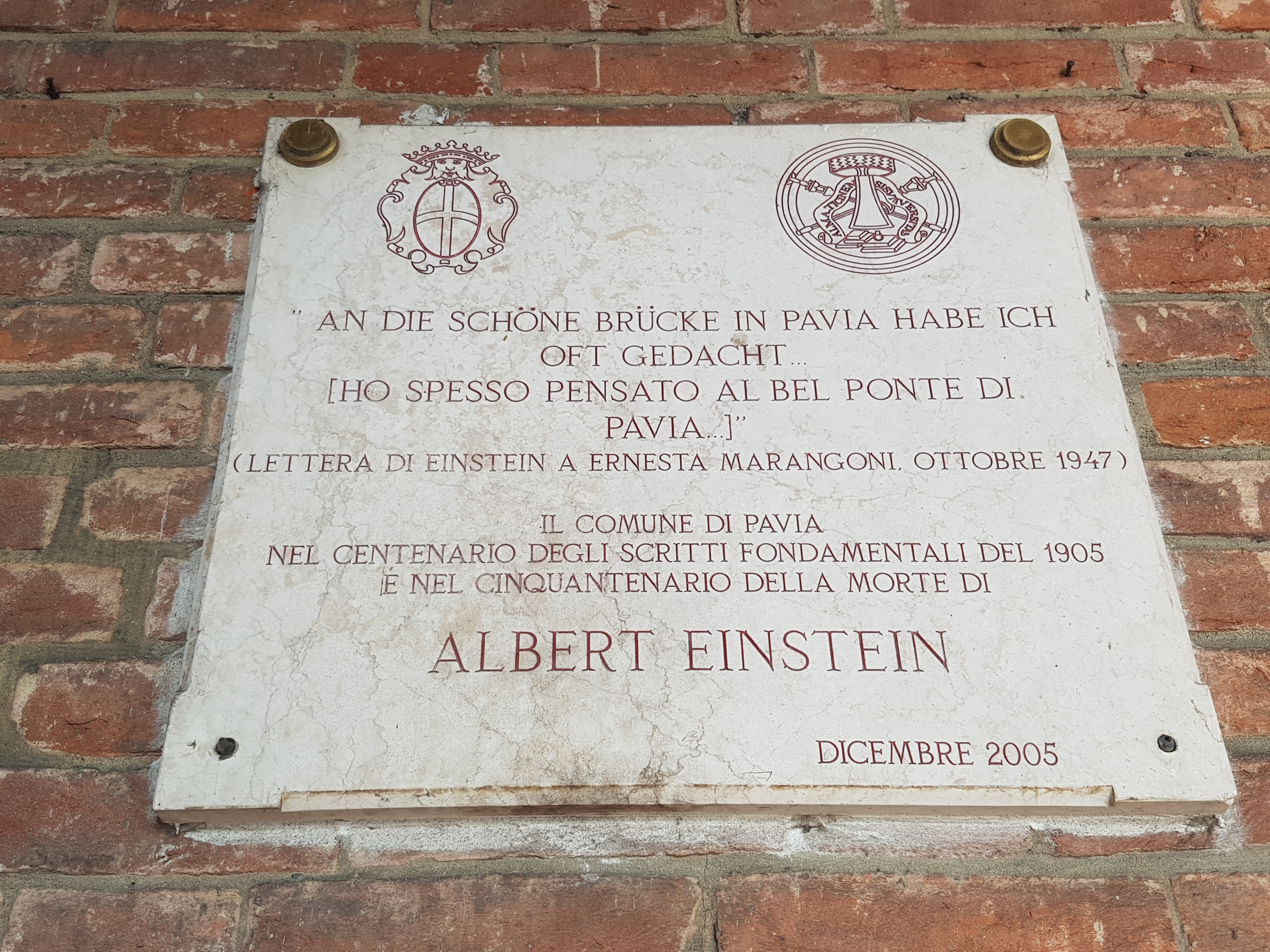
Plaque on the Monumental Bridge as described by Albert Einstein

In 2005, on the occasion of the 50th anniversary of the death of Albert Einstein, a plaque was placed in the central portion of the bridge. The plaque reads An die schöne Brücke in Pavia habe ich oft gedacht ('I have often thought about that beautiful bridge in Pavia'), a quote from a letter written by the scientist in 1947 to an Italian friend which referred to a period of time Einstein had spent in Pavia when he was 15 years old.

== In mass culture ==
The bridge was shown in a famous scene of the film The Overcoat, by Alberto Lattuada, depicting the poor clerk Carmine De Carmine, played by Renato Rascel.
