= Zuber Corners, Ontario =

Zuber Corners
- Unincorporated rural community
- Location within Regional Municipality of Waterloo Location within Southern Ontario Location within Canada
- Coordinates: 43°35′13″N 80°28′00″W
- Country: Canada
- Province: Ontario
- Region: Waterloo
- Township: Woolwich
- Time zone: UTC-5 (Eastern (EST))
  - Summer (DST): UTC-4 (EDT)
- GNBC Code: FDGCP

Zuber Corners is an unincorporated rural community in Woolwich Township, Waterloo, Ontario, Canada.

Zuber Corners is located at the crossroads of County Road 23 and Line 86. The Grand River is a short distance west.

== History ==
The settlement is named for Jacob Zuber, who lived on the southeast corner of the settlement.

In 1874, a stone school was built at Zuber Corners. It replaced a school in nearby West Montrose which was being flooded each year. The school closed in 1967.

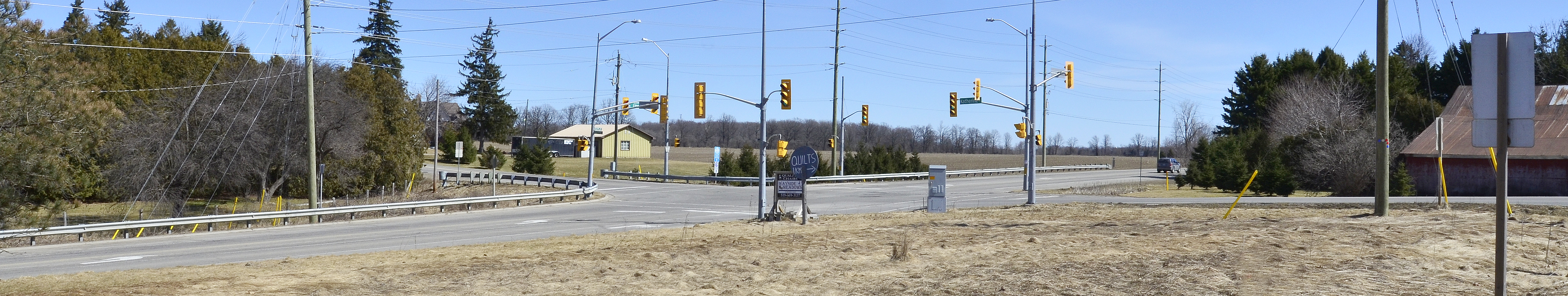
Looking northeast at Zuber Corners
