= Woolwich, Ontario =

Township in Ontario, Canada

Woolwich
- Township (lower-tier)
- Township of Woolwich
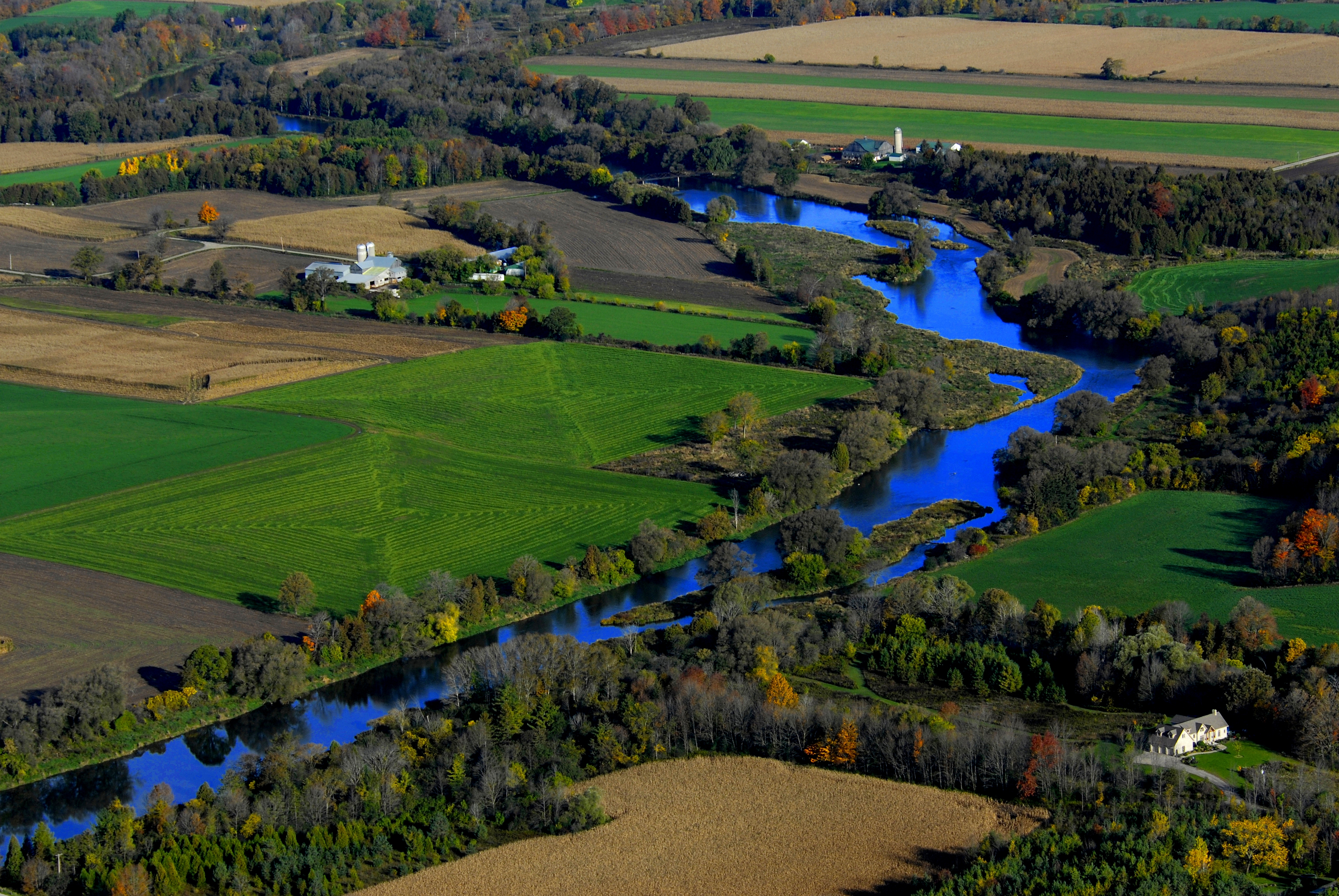

- Location within Regional Municipality of Waterloo Location within Southern Ontario
- Coordinates: 43°34′N 80°29′W
- Country: Canada
- Province: Ontario
- Regional municipality: Waterloo
- Settled: 1798
- Incorporated: 1816

Government
  - Type: Township
  - Mayor: Sandy Shantz
  - Councillors: List: Scott McMillan; Patrick Merlihan; Fred Redekop; Murray Martin; Lary Shantz
  - Governing Body: Woolwich Township Council
  - MP: Tim Louis (LPC)
  - MPP: Mike Harris Jr. (PC)

Area
  - Land: 326.15 km^{2} (125.93 sq mi)

Population (2021)
  - Total: 26,999
  - Density: 82.8/km^{2} (214/sq mi)
- Time zone: UTC-5 (EST)
  - Summer (DST): UTC-4 (EDT)
- Area codes: 519, 226, 548
- Website: www.woolwich.ca

The Township of Woolwich (local pronunciation: IPA /ˈwʊl̴ɪt͡ʃ/) is a rural township in Ontario, Canada. The municipality is located in the northeastern part of Waterloo Region and is made up of 10 small communities, with Elmira, Ontario the largest and St. Jacobs, Ontario the second largest. The population at the time of the 2021 Census was 26,999, up from the 2016 population of 25,006. Waterloo Region is still home to the largest population of Old Order Mennonites in Canada, particularly in the areas around St Jacobs and Elmira. They are often seen on the local roads using their traditional horse and buggy transportation; many also use horses to pull the implements in their farm fields.

Woolwich is part of the Regional Municipality of Waterloo and is located directly to the north and east of the City of Waterloo. It is bounded by the cities of Kitchener, Waterloo, and Cambridge. The township is a municipality as established by the Regional Municipality of Waterloo Act 1972, which created a regional government structure and established limits of the local municipalities effective January 1, 1973. Woolwich Township has its own municipal government consisting of five councillors and a mayor; the latter also serves on the Waterloo Region Council.

== History ==
=== Early history ===
The land which now makes up Woolwich Township, with the Grand River on the east, and the Conestogo River on the west, originally belonged to the Huron Nation followed by the Mohawk Nation. The first settlers arrived in the late 18th century. In 1798, William Wallace was one of the first settlers after he was deeded 86,078 acres (348 km2) of land on the Grand River for a cost of $16,364. Originally Block three of Indian Lands, this area now comprises a large part of Woolwich Township. The parcel of land called "Woolwich" was probably named (in 1816) after a town in Kent, England. The early settlers were primarily from England or Ireland until about 1830; they settled to the east of the Grand River. Afterwards, German Mennonite families from Pennsylvania and from Waterloo Township settled west of the river.

In 1807, Wallace sold the major portion of his tract to Mennonites from Pennsylvania, trustees for the German Company, many of whom would settle this area. Wallace sold 45,185 acres (183 km^{2}) of land to the German Company at $1.00 an acre. Captain Smith, a loyalist from Vermont, settled at the confluence of the Grand and Conestogo Rivers in 1807. Their large log home served as an inn for travelers and he operated a stagecoach for carrying mail from 1835 to 1850. The first church in Woolwich, was built by the Mennonites from Pennsylvania in approximately 1823 at the Three Bridges, now part of Conestogo. Woolwich was incorporated as a Township in 1816, and was part of Halton County until 1842 when it became part of Wellington District. In 1852, it became part of the new Waterloo County.

Starting in 1821, a part of Woolwich, to the east of the Grand River (Block 3), owned by James Crooks, attracted dozens of families from England and Scotland. Previously, this area had few settlers, the most notable a Mr. Cox; the creek which enters the Grand River at what is now Winterbourne was named after him. Immigrants from Scotland began settling the Cox Creek area in 1834, led by John Davidson. He opened the first post office in the township, naming it East Woolwich. Captain Henry Lanphier arrived in 1854 and soon built a sawmill and flour mill after damming Cox Creek. Residents agreed with him that the settlement should be renamed Winterbourne, Ontario. By 1837, the Scots established St. Andrew's Presbyterian in 1837. A Presbyterian church was not built until 1870, made of logs; it was replaced in 1870 by one built of brick, and is currently a private home near the Winterbourne Presbyterian Cemetery. By 1867, Winterbourne had a population of 160, three churches, a school, a post office, a general store, two mills, two hotels, two blacksmiths, a tailor, a shoemaker and a physician.

St. Jacobs, like nearby Conestogo (both in Woolwich), was primarily Germanic and was first settled in 1830. In 1834, Edward Bristow from Sussex, England became one of Elmira's first settlers when he purchased 53 acres (210,000 m^{2}) of land at this location for 50 cents per acre. He started the first store, tavern and potashery. A community by the name of Bristow's Corners was already in existence in 1839 when a post office was assigned there; it was renamed Elmira in 1853.

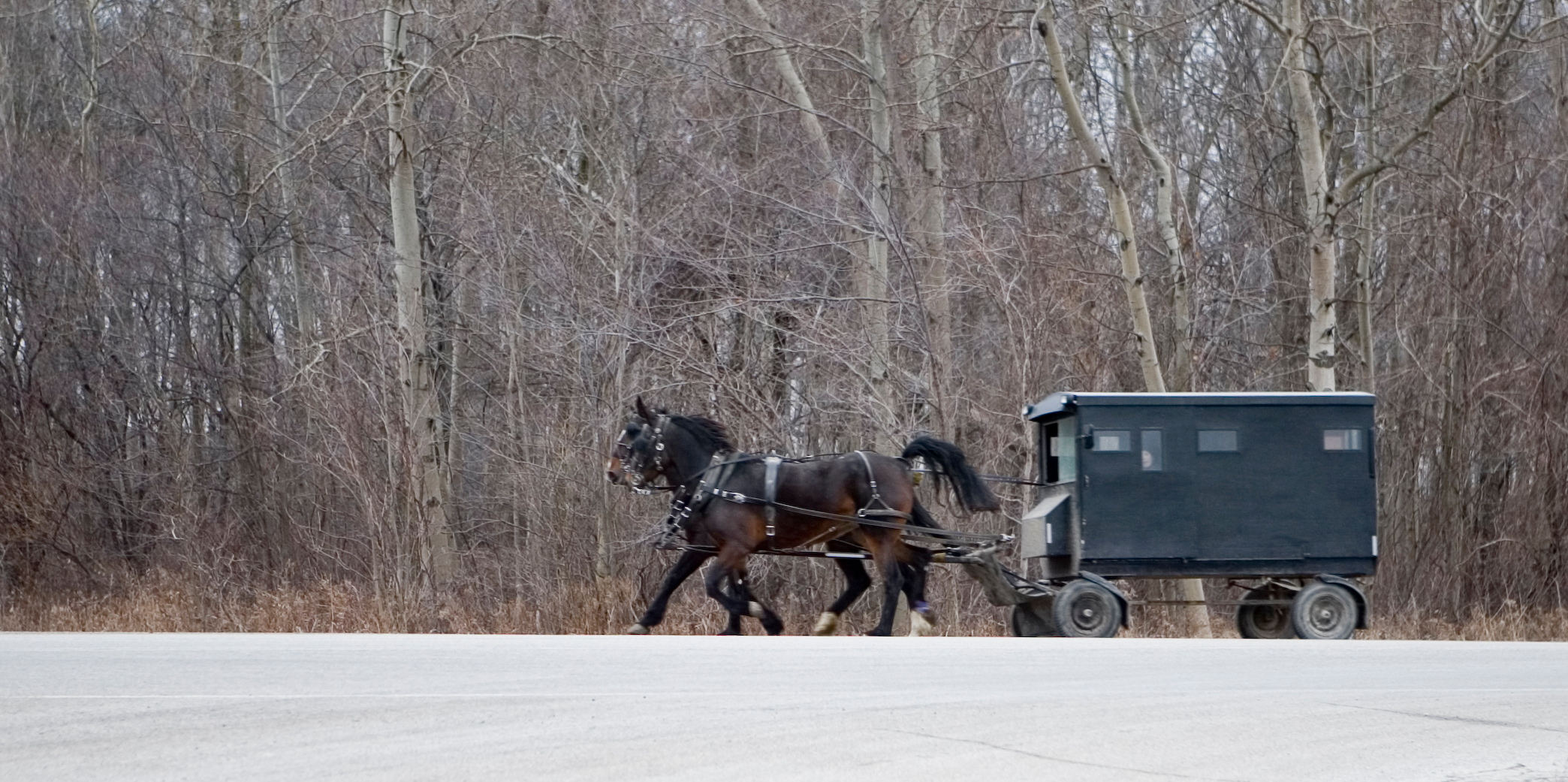
Old Order Mennonite buggy still common in Woolwich Township

Historical records suggest that David Musselman founded Conestogo after buying land in 1830. He built a sawmill in 1844 and after damming the Conestogo River, he added a flour mill and a second sawmill. The hamlet formed in this area, known as Musselman's Mills until 1852 when it became Conestogo because many of the settlers had come from the Conestoga River area of Pennsylvania. Records about the entire township from 1846 indicate that the area was thinly settled although the land was excellent and there were large tracts of hardwood. There were two grist mills, two sawmills and an Episcopal church. The population count in 1841 indicated 1009 people.

Woolwich Township Council was organized in January 1850 with five councillors, of whom John N. Meyer was named as Reeve; James Dow was appointed as clerk and treasurer. A significant influx to the St. Jacobs area started afterwards, primarily consisting of additional Mennonites from Pennsylvania. Farmer and pioneer industrialist Jacob C. Snider, of Swiss German descent, was the most important settler at the time and the community was named after him: Jakobstettel (Jacob's Village). He built a dam to power several mills and then built a sawmill, woolen mill and flour mill by 1852. This helped to attract others to the small community. The St. was added to the name simply to make it sound more pleasing and the pluralization was in honour of the combined efforts of Jacob C. Snider (1791–1865) and his son, Jacob C. Snider Jr. (1822–1857), founders of the village. The first post office in St. Jacobs opened in 1852, called St. Jacobs and the village was incorporated in that year. By 1855, the population was 400. Mennonites formed a significant proportion of the population in the 1850s. Most were the so-called Pennsylvania Dutch, not referring to the Netherlands but a misnomer for Deitsch or Deutsch (German). They became known as Old Order Mennonite due to their very conservative, traditional lifestyle. (Other Mennonites in the area now have a less conservative lifestyle.)

=== Decentralization and later urban growth ===
Throughout its early history, Woolwich was predominantly decentralized and rural in character. It did not become the location of the Waterloo County administration apparatus, and the first wave of railway development in the county passed it by. In his study of Waterloo County's growth and urbanization, urban studies scholar Fred Dahms uses "functional units" as a metric of a settlement's developmental complexity, rather than relying on population counts, village or town status, or other metrics. Each "functional unit" is based on a defined economic hub or activity, such as banking or postal services, milling, or a general store. In this measure, one building (such as a combined general store and post office) would count as multiple functional units, providing an alternative way to measure the development of a pioneer economy. For 1864, while Woolwich had no large centre falling within the top five counts of functional units in the county, it did have three in the top ten: St. Jacobs, Elmira, and Conestogo. St. Jacobs, Conestogo, Winterbourne, and Elmira were all incorporated as villages by this point.

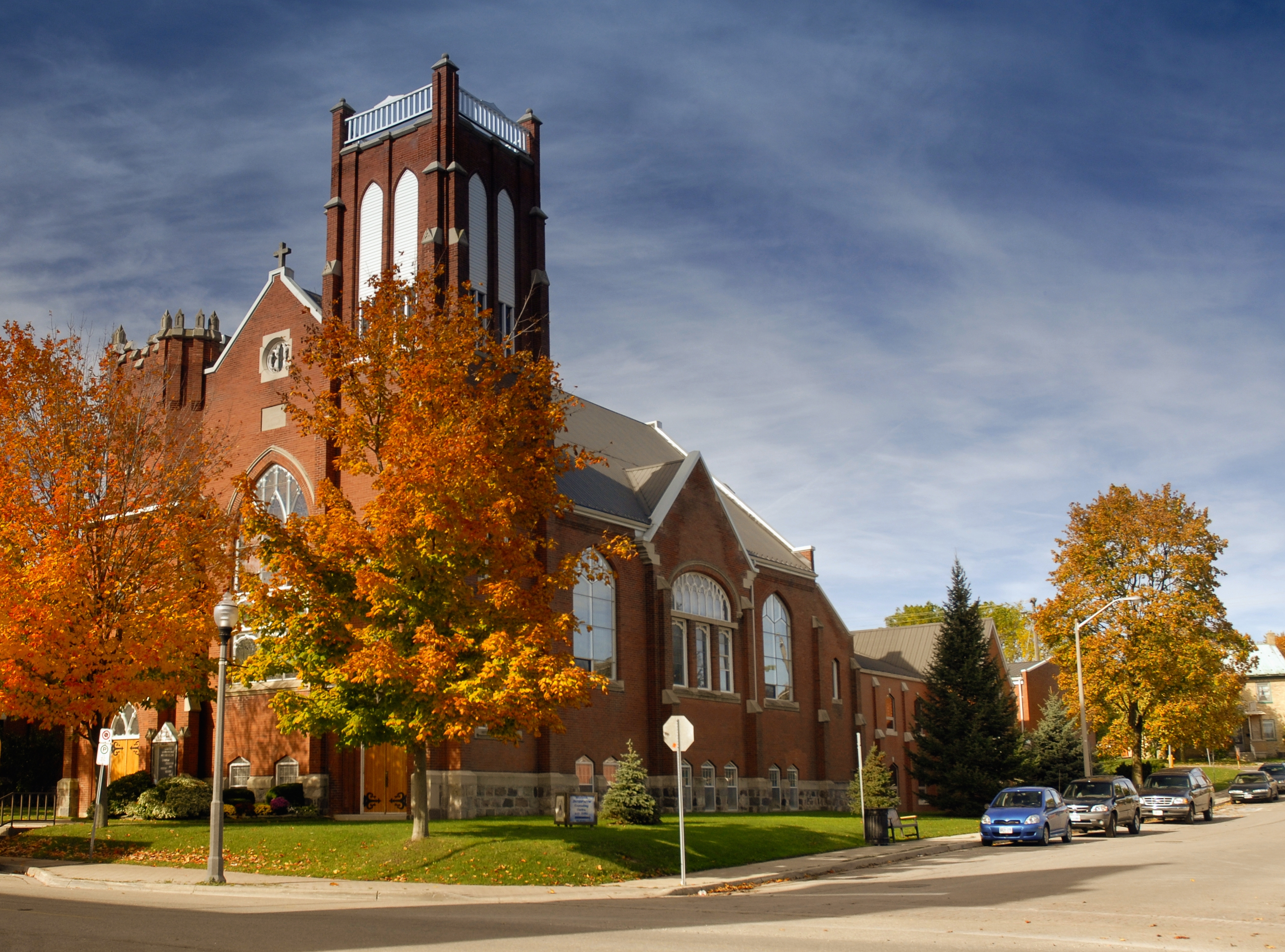
St. James Lutheran Church, Elmira

By the 1870s, things had changed dramatically; economic activity in Waterloo County was rapidly centralizing, and Elmira was now tied for fifth in the county in terms of functional units, alongside Ayr. In 1878, a significant majority of Woolwich village industries advertising themselves in the Armstrong and Company Gazetteer and Directory for Waterloo County were located in Elmira, with a number also located in St. Jacobs. This included carriage makers, lumber mills, metal crafters, a saddle and harness maker, a woollen mill, and others. In 1891, the Waterloo Junction Railway (part of the Grand Trunk Railway system) was extended north from Waterloo through Heidelberg and St. Jacobs, to Elmira. The Guelph and Goderich Railway (part of the Canadian Pacific Railway system) would later follow, running across the township from east to west.

In the early 1900s, Woolwich Township exhibited a strong German culture and those of German origin made up a third of the population in 1911. Because of increased immigration direct from Germany, Lutherans were the primary religious group by that time; there were nearly three times as many Lutherans as Mennonites.

Woolwich was the location of one of the earliest concrete roads in Canadian history. A 1.5-mile (2.4 km) stretch of what was then Provincial County Road 75, between St. Jacobs and the Grand Trunk Railway crossing south of Elmira, was upgraded in 1919 using a provincial subsidy under the newly-created Department of Public Highways of Ontario.

During the 1960s, due to the poor disposal practices of chemical manufacturers, contamination seeped down to the aquifer in and around Elmira. This contamination forced local water wells to close in 1990. Water is now delivered via a pipeline from Waterloo and other near local areas.

== Demographics ==
Historical population
Year	Pop.	±%
1991	17,365	—
1996	17,325	−0.2%
2001	18,201	+5.1%
2006	19,658	+8.0%
2011	23,145	+17.7%
2016	25,006	+8.0%
2021	26,999	+8.0%

In the 2021 Census of Population conducted by Statistics Canada, Woolwich had a population of 26,999 living in 9,359 of its 9,556 total private dwellings, a change of 8% from its 2016 population of 25,006. With a land area of 326.56 km^{2} (126.09 sq mi), it had a population density of 82.7/km^{2} (214.1/sq mi) in 2021.

In 2016, the average age in Woolwich was 39, with 49% of the population male and 51% female. In 2016, English was the predominant language spoken at 88% of households, followed by German 8%, and Dutch 0.58%, which make up the top three most spoken languages in Woolwich.

== Economy ==
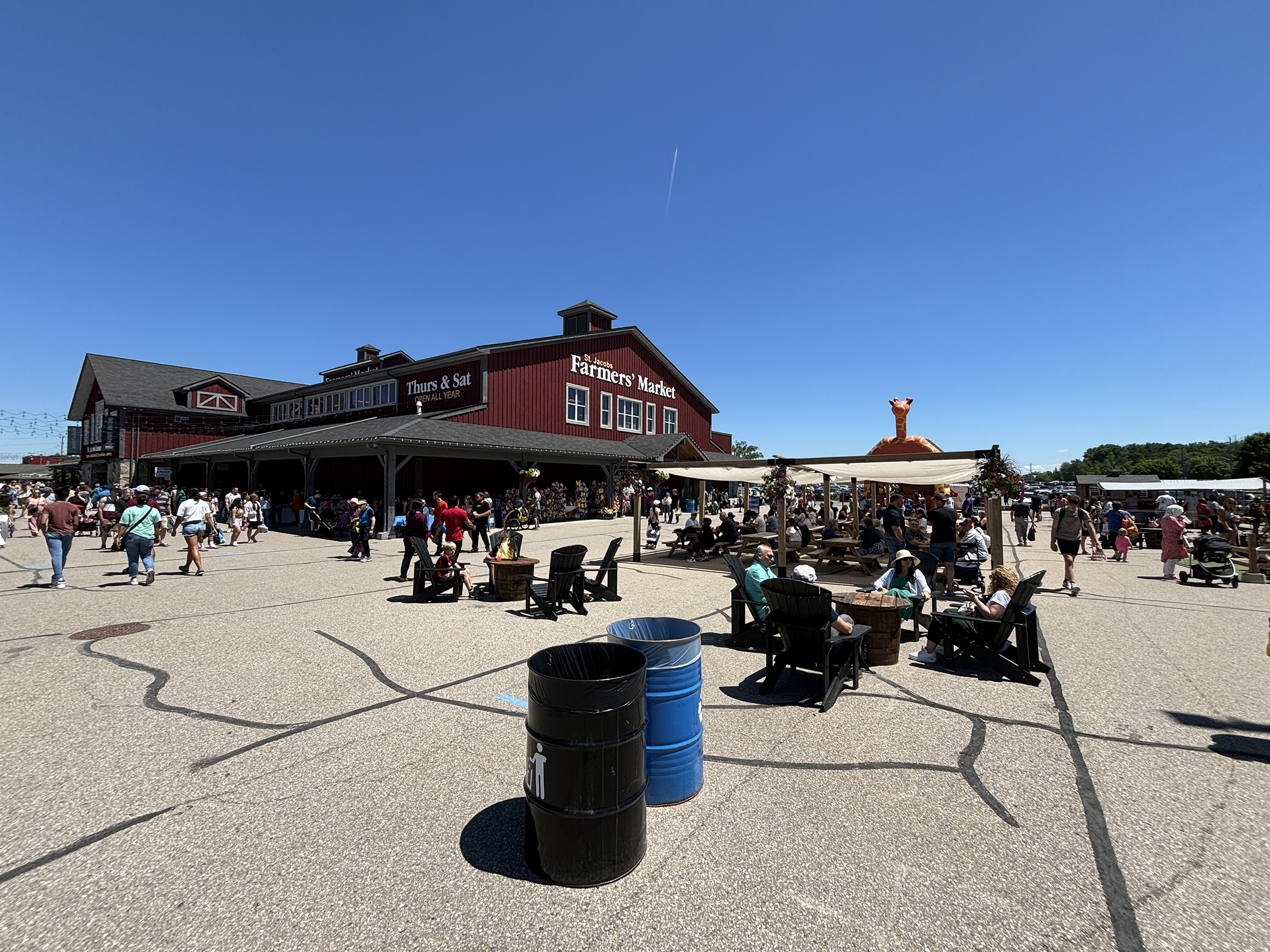
The St. Jacobs Market is a major tourist attraction.

Elmira is the primary industrial centre of Woolwhich Township. Major employers include Trylon TSF, Sanyo Machine Works, Elmira Pet Products, Lanxess (formerly Chemtura and Uniroyal), Toyota Boshoku (formerly Trim Masters), Engineered Lifting Systems, and Southfield Windows & Doors. Since the 1970s, tourism has become an increasingly important industry in Elmira and especially in St. Jacobs which has a very popular Farmers' Market and many quaint stores in its downtown area.

St. Jacobs features dozens of artisans in historic buildings, such as the Country Mill, Village Silos, Mill Shed, and the Old Factory. Visitors may watch artisans make pottery, quilts, designer clothes, jewellery, glass vases, woven wall hangings tiffany lamps, stained glass doors, miniature doll houses and more. There are also two blacksmith shops. The two-kilometre millrace is a pleasant, treed hiking path along the Conestogo River. The Visitor Centre in downtown St. Jacobs is a Mennonite interpretation centre, providing information and education about the Mennonite people in the township.

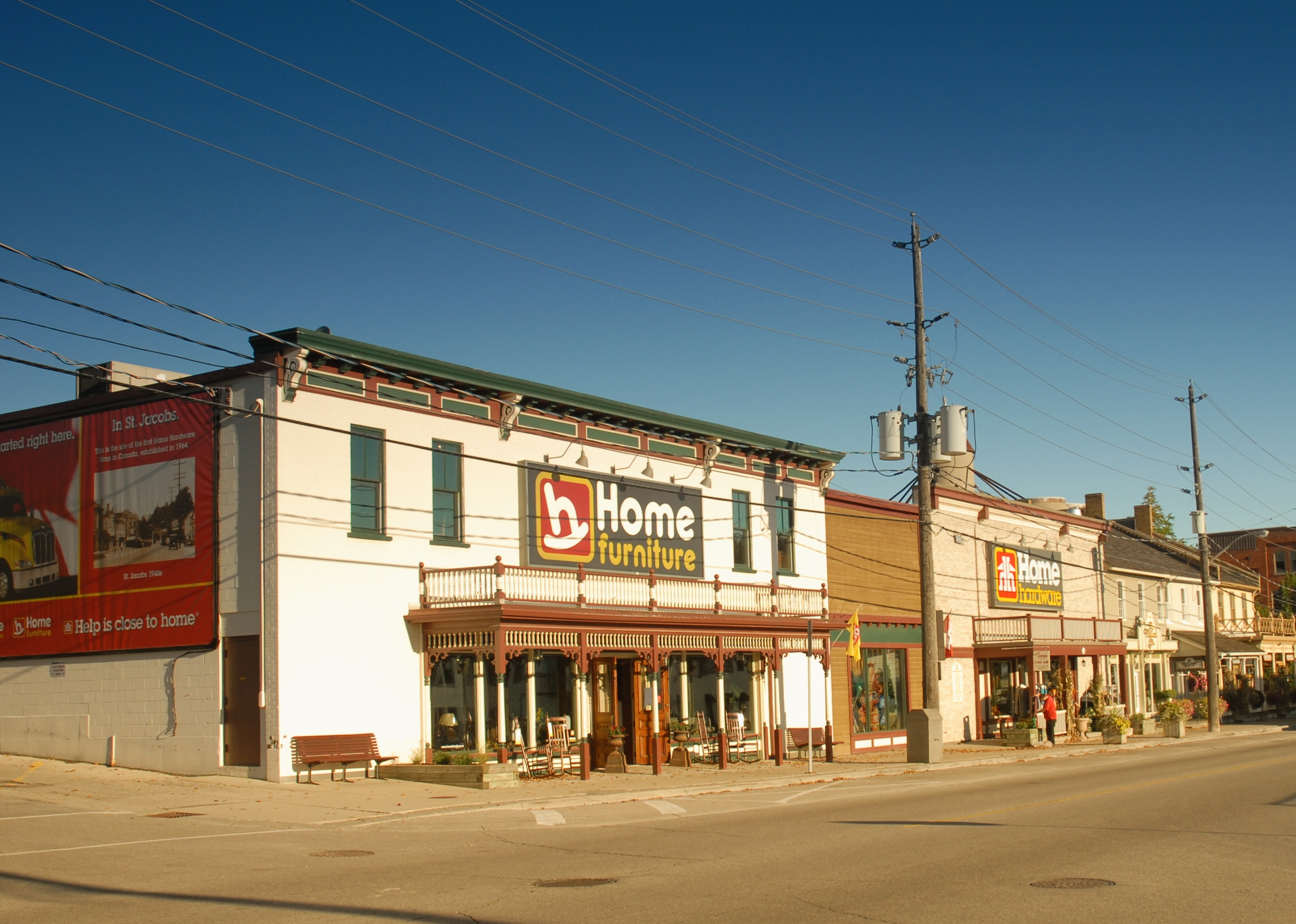
The original Home Hardware building

St. Jacobs is also the headquarters of Home Hardware, a national chain of over 1000 independent hardware retail stores located across Canada that was founded in the village in 1963. The first store opened in St. Jacobs in 1964. It remains in use by the chain as the furniture outlet but a new store was built across the street, opening in November 2014.

Economic development for the township is handled by the Region of Waterloo. Elmira and St. Jacobs have their own Business Improvement Area committees.

== Government ==
The township is governed by an elected mayor and five elected councillors; two councillors representing Wards 1 and 3, and one for Ward 2. Council meetings are held in the Council Chambers at 24 Church Street West, Elmira. The mayor serves also as the regional councillor and sits on the various boards, including Waterloo North Hydro, Grand River Conservation Authority, Regional Library Board, Kiwanis Transit Board, Waterloo Region Community Housing Committee, Kissing Bridge Trailway Advisory Committee and Airport Master Plan Committee. After the election in 2018 the elected council members are:

Mayor: Sandy Shantz

Councillors:

- Ward 1: Evan Burgess
- Ward 1: Nathan Cadeau
- Ward 2: Eric Schwindt
- Ward 3: Bonnie Bryant
- Ward 3: Kayla Grant

Woolwich is one of seven municipalities that make up the Waterloo Regional Council. Members of the Regional Council serve a four-year term and Woolwich's representative is the mayor alone. The Waterloo Regional Council is made up of the chair and eight councillors, as well as the mayors of the seven municipalities: Cambridge, Kitchener, Waterloo, and the townships of North Dumfries, Wellesley, Wilmot and Woolwich.

== Communities ==
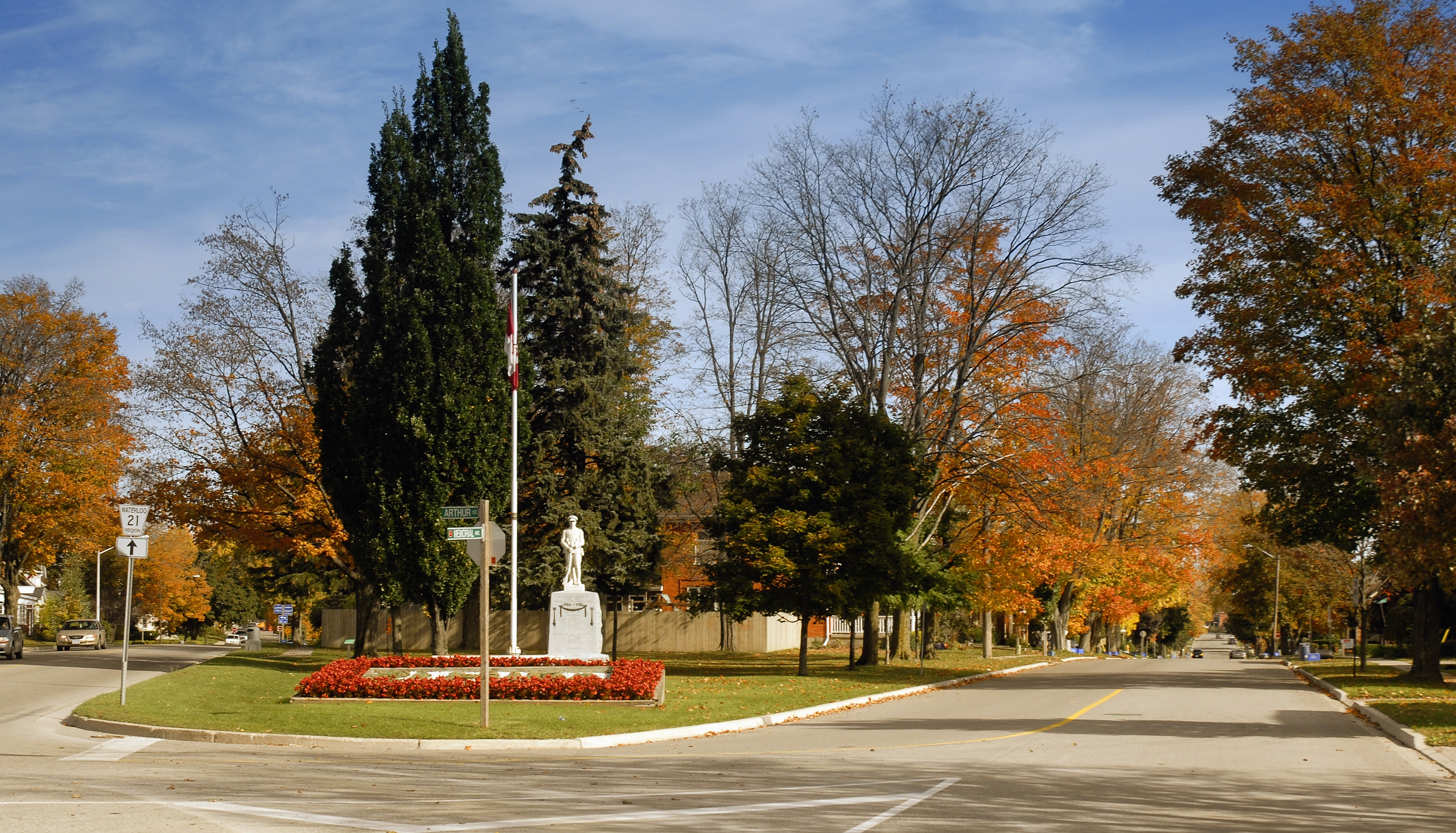
Street scene in Elmira

Woolwich consists of an extensive rural area along with residential communities and industrial/commercial areas. The residential communities include Elmira, St. Jacobs, Breslau, Conestogo, Heidelberg, Maryhill, North Woolwich, Bloomingdale, Weissenburg, West Montrose, Floradale, Winterbourne, and Zuber Corners.

The three largest areas offering a range of residential, industrial, commercial and recreational uses are in Elmira, St. Jacobs and Breslau; the latter adjoins Kitchener and is the fastest growing community in the township.

Woolwich Township spans approximately 326.15 km².

== Infrastructure ==
=== Health and medicine ===
Woolwich does not have its own hospitals, but residents of Woolwich have access to four nearby hospitals: Grand River Hospital, St. Mary's General Hospital, Groves Memorial Community Hospital in Fergus and Guelph General Hospital.

=== Transportation ===
Woolwich is home to the Region of Waterloo International Airport (YKF), which is south of Breslau to the east of the Grand River.

There are two railway lines through Woolwich: the Guelph Subdivision (running approximately east–west) and the Waterloo Spur, a branch line of the Guelph Subdivision which runs north through Waterloo and St. Jacobs before terminating at Elmira. The junction of the two lines is in Kitchener, east of the Kitchener railway station. The Canadian National Railway (CN) operates freight rail services on both lines. The Waterloo Central Railway, a tourist and heritage railway, operates along the Waterloo Spur between Elmira and a stop near Northfield station in north Waterloo. It provides the only stopping passenger service in Woolwich. GO Transit and Via Rail operate regional and intercity services respectively, both along the Guelph Subdivision, but do not stop in the township. A GO station in Breslau is planned, which would provide GO Transit passenger service on the Kitchener line.

Grand River Transit's 21 Elmira route provides local bus service between Woolwich and Waterloo, running between Conestoga station (in Waterloo) and Elmira. The route launched in 2009. PC Connect, an inter-regional community bus service based in Perth County, launched in 2020 with a route connecting Kitchener, Waterloo, St. Jacobs, Elmira, and Listowel together.

Highways

- Highway 7: Southern Portion of Woolwich (Breslau Area)
- Highway 85: Entering Woolwich from the City of Waterloo
- Highway 8: Approximately 20 km (12 miles) to Elmira and 12 km (7.5 miles) to the Woolwich boundary
- Highway 401: Approximately 28 km (17 miles) to Elmira and 20 km (12 miles) to the woolwich boundary

=== Trails ===
Woolwich Township has eleven trails; much of the 45-kilometre (28 mi) long Kissing Bridge Trailway runs through this area.

=== Woolwich Memorial Centre ===
The Woolwich Memorial Centre (WMC) is the Township of Woolwich's newest state-of-the-art facility comprising two NHL-sized ice surfaces, two pools, fitness centre and walking track. The facility also includes a community centre, seniors centre, youth centre, Concourse Cafe, two meeting rooms and offices for minor sport teams.

== Education ==
Schools in Woolwich are operated by the Waterloo Region District School Board and Waterloo Catholic District School Board. Woolwich has eight elementary schools; seven are public and one is Catholic. Elmira District Secondary School is Woolwich's only secondary (high) school, but is ranked by Fraser Institute as a top Ontario high school.

== Gallery ==
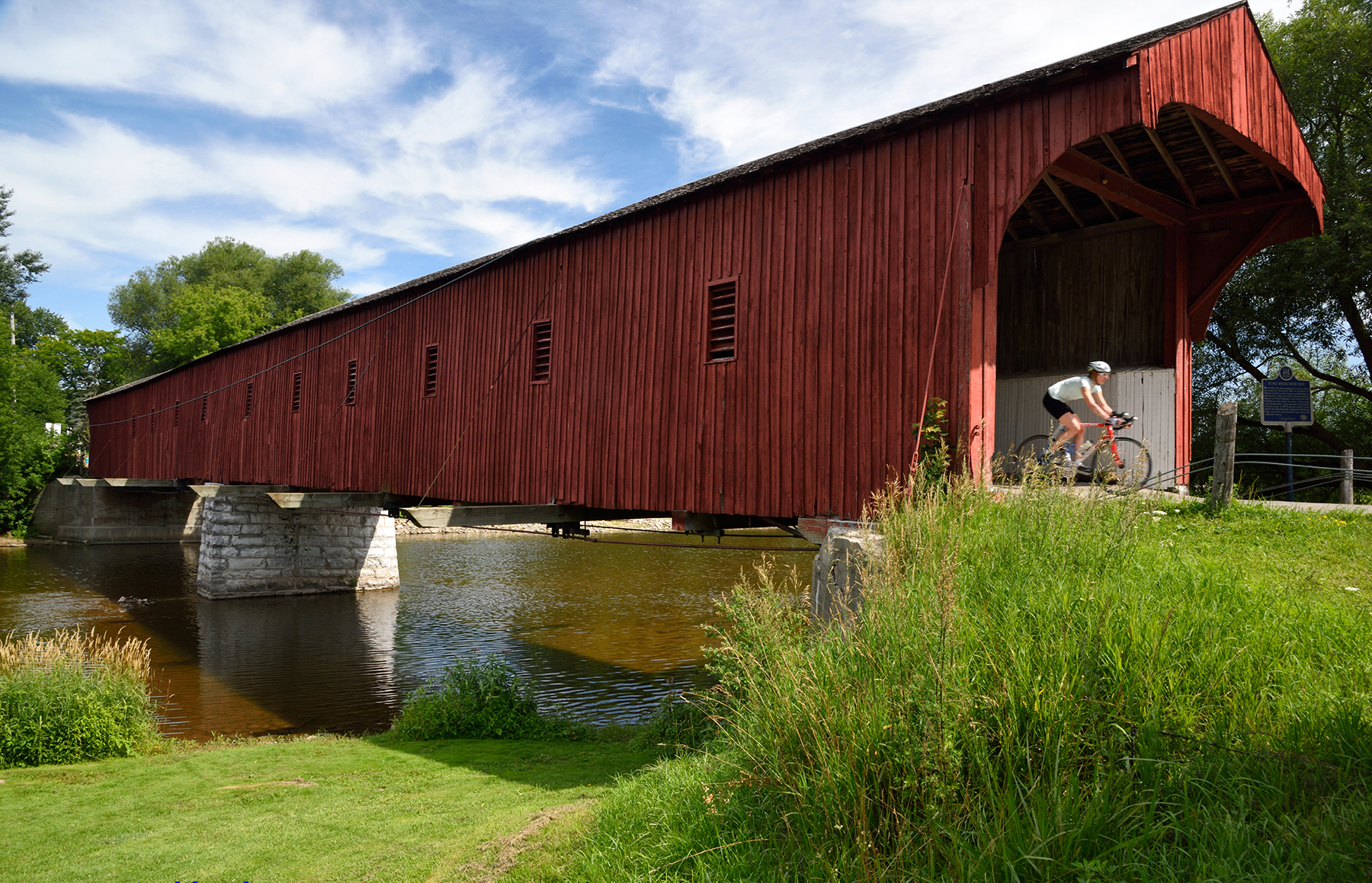
West Montrose covered bridge, Grand River

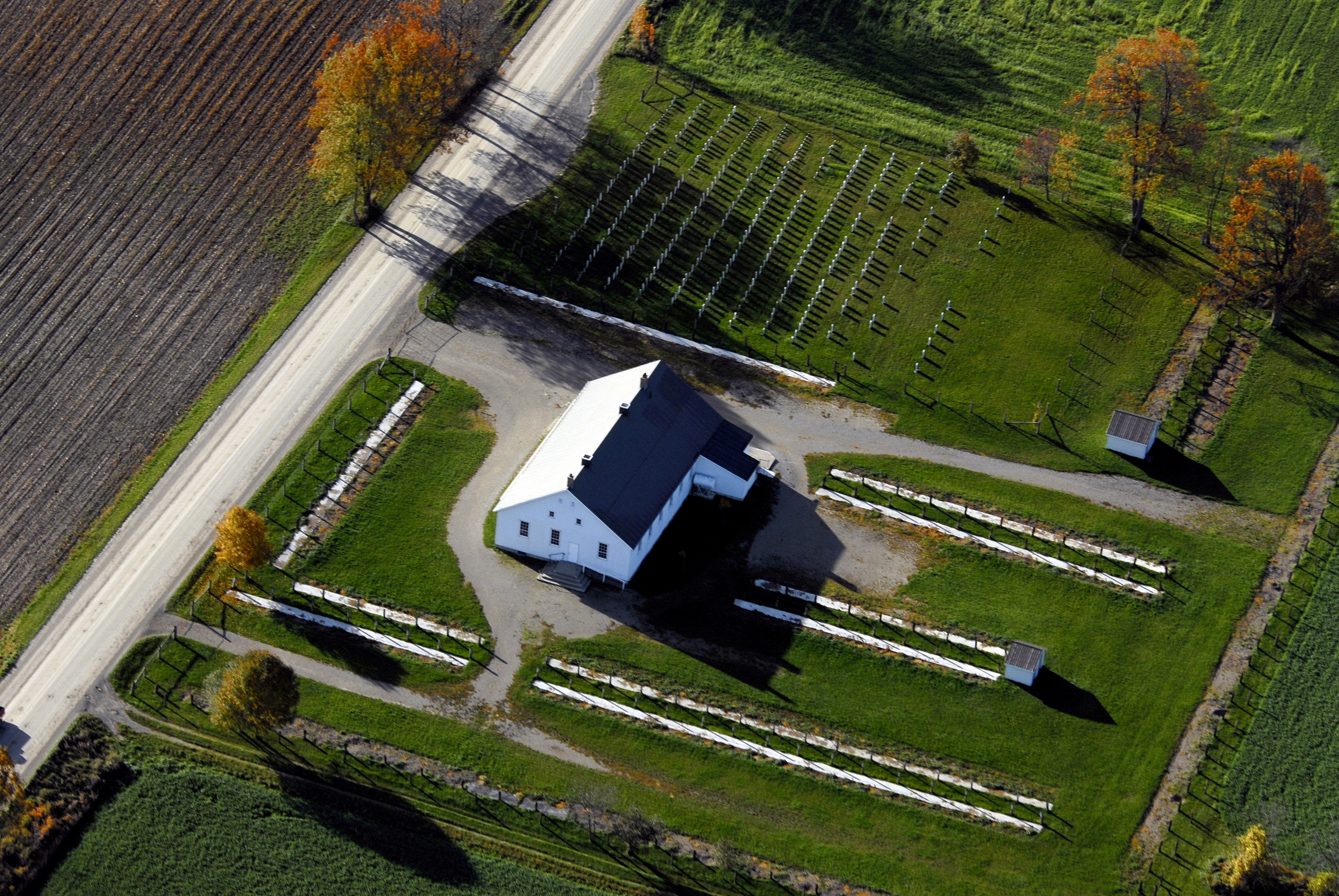
Woolwich countryside

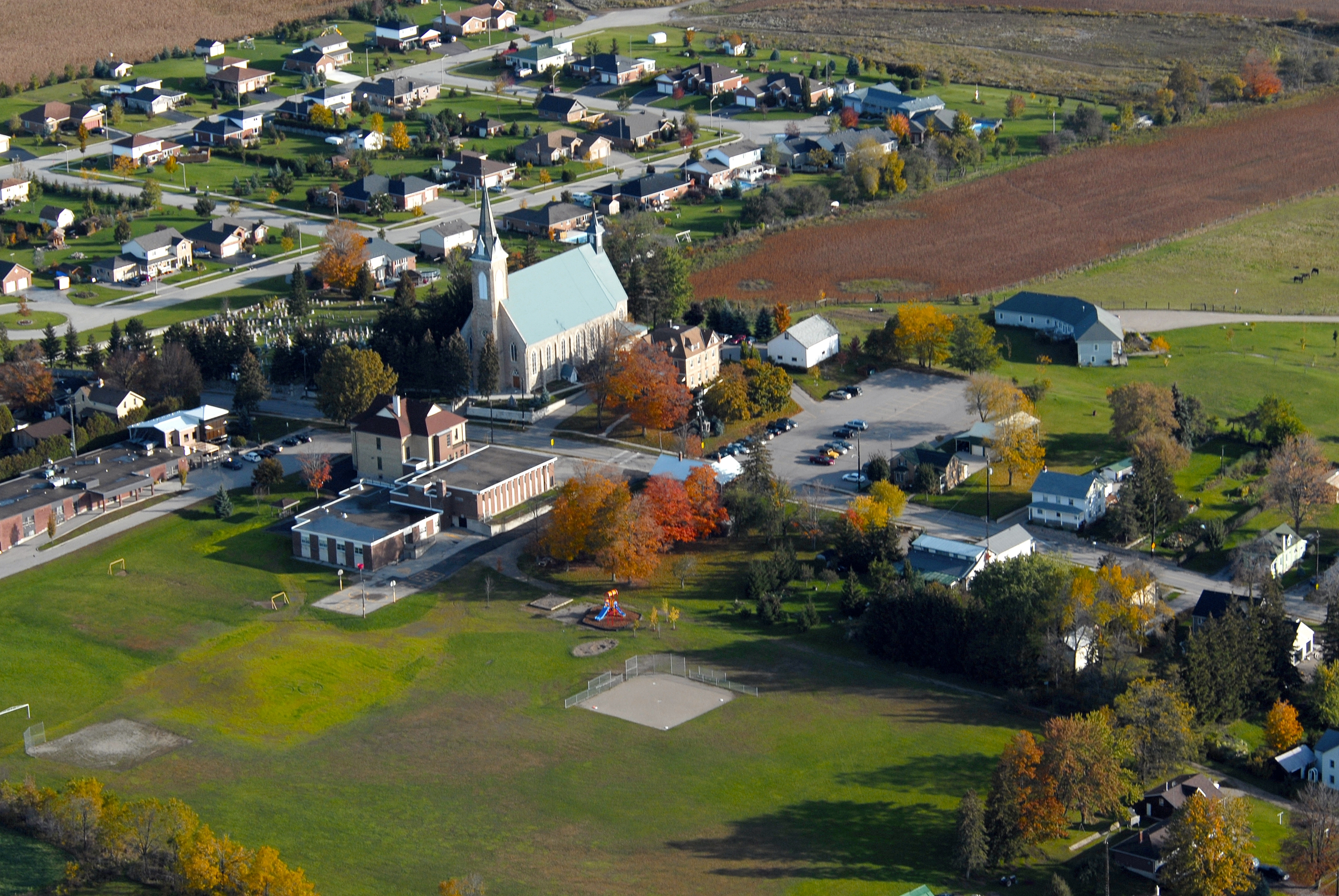
Maryhill, Woolwich

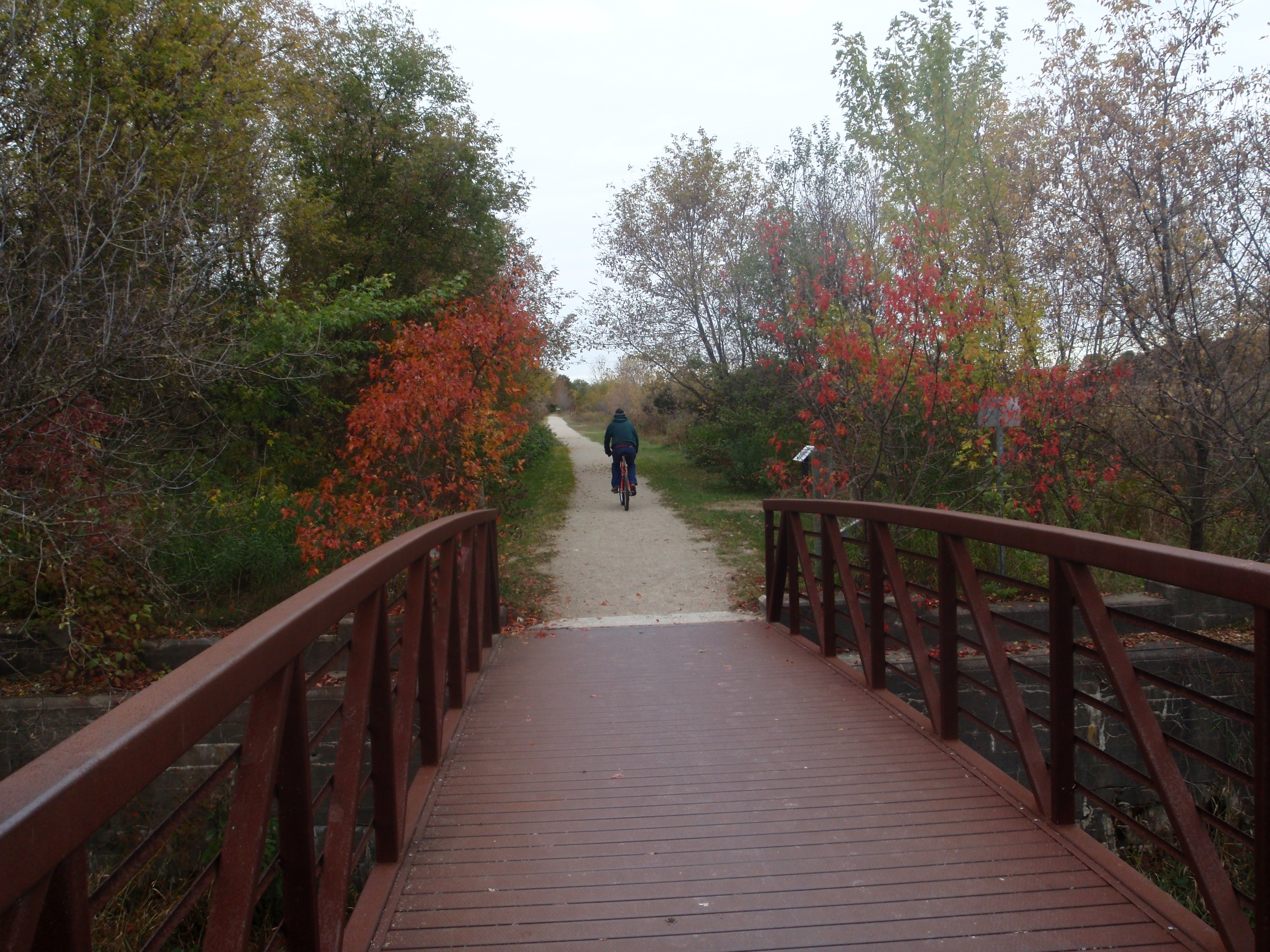
Woolwich Trail

== See also ==
- List of townships in Ontario
- List of municipalities in Ontario
