= Floradale, Ontario =

Floradale
- Unincorporated community
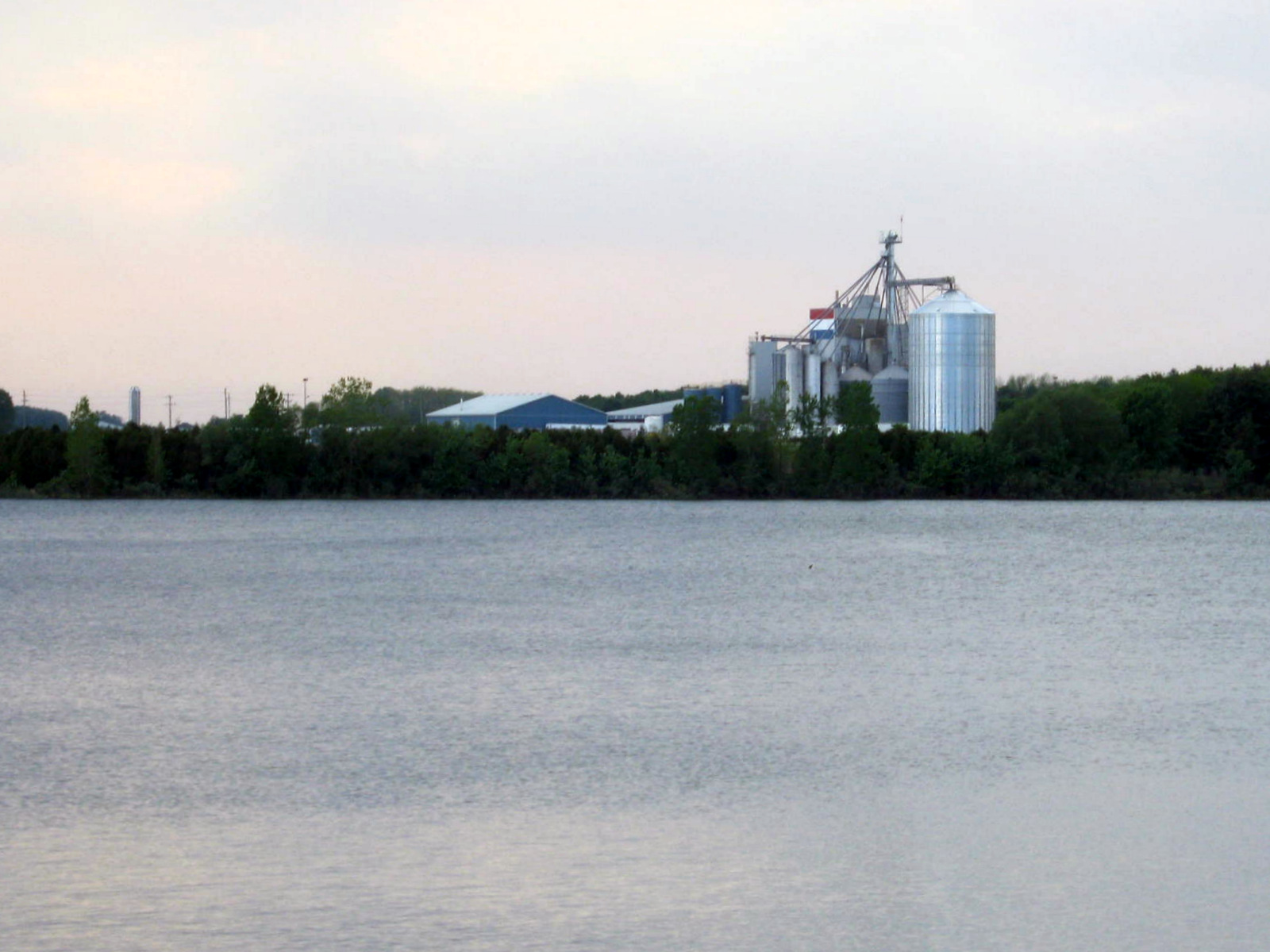
- View of the Floradale Feed Mill seen across the Woolwich Reservoir

- Location within Regional Municipality of Waterloo Location within Southern Ontario
- Coordinates: 43°38′7″N 80°34′47″W
- Country: Canada
- Province: Ontario
- Regional municipality: Waterloo
- Township: Woolwich
- Time zone: UTC-5 (EST)
  - Summer (DST): UTC-4 (EDT)
- Forward sortation area: N0B 1V0
- Area codes: 519 and 226
- NTS Map: 040P10
- GNBC Code: FBEKY

Floradale is an unincorporated rural community in Southwestern Ontario, Canada. It is part of the township of Woolwich in the Regional Municipality of Waterloo. The community is located 5 kilometres (3 miles) to the north of the town of Elmira, Ontario and 20 kilometres (12 miles) to the north of the city of Waterloo, Ontario. Canagagigue Creek, a tributary of the Grand River, flows through the village. The community is located in an area where there is an historically large settlement of Old Order Mennonites noted for their traditional customs, dress, and use of horse and buggies.

== History ==
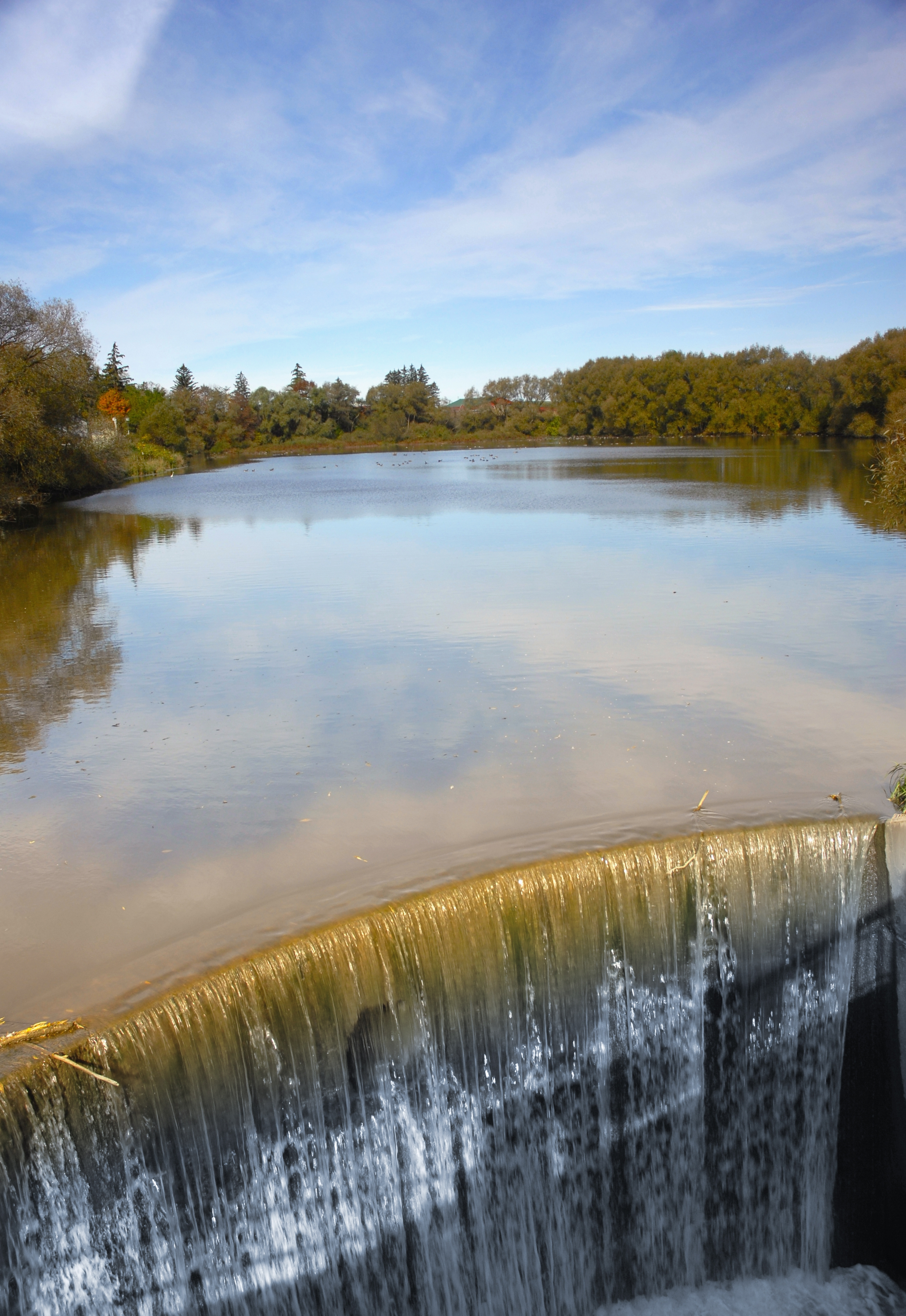
Floradale Dam

Although the land on which Floradale is located was purchased by prospective settlers in 1808, there was no significant development until a flour mill and sawmill were built in the later part of the 1800s. In subsequent years, other businesses, including a general store, flax mill, blacksmith shop, and cider mill, served the needs of the village and the surrounding rural area. The early inhabitants of the area established Mennonite, Lutheran, and Evangelical churches.

In 1910 Daniel Bowman, the then owner of the flour mill, built a wooden dam across Canagagigue Creek to create the Floradale mill pond. Because the dam was too high, causing flooding problems upstream, it was replaced in 1914 by a crescent-shaped cement dam, one of the first. A millrace was constructed under the road to direct the water to the flour mill to operate the overshot water wheel. In 1964, the millrace was filled in when water was no longer the major source of power. The mill is located at 2239 Floradale Road.

Floradale was originally called Musselman after Jacob Musselman, a Pennsylvania German and one of the first settlers. In 1863, the settlement was named Flora, and in 1876, 'dale' was added to avoid confusion with nearby Elora.

== Local Information ==
Floradale Public School is a Kindergarten to Grade 8 school. The majority of the students are bussed to the school from the surrounding rural areas.

The Woolwich Township Fire Department Floradale Station was built in 2008. Emergency services involve the participation of volunteer fire fighters from the community.

Houses of worship include Floradale Mennonite Church and Crystal View Mennonite Church.

Floradale Feed Mill is the largest business in Floradale.

== Places of interest ==
Lions Lake Trail is a seven-kilometre trail around the Woolwich Reservoir in Floradale. The trail is used for hiking, biking, cross-country skiing, and snowshoeing.

The Floradale Community Park features a playground, picnic shelter, baseball diamond, and a view of the Floradale dam.

== See also ==
- Woolwich, Ontario
- List of unincorporated communities in Ontario
