= North Woolwich, Ontario =

North Woolwich
- Unincorporated rural community
- Location of North Woolwich in Canada North Woolwich (Ontario)
- Coordinates: 43°39′24″N 80°32′47″W
- Country: Canada
- Province: Ontario
- Region: Waterloo
- Township: Woolwich
- Time zone: UTC-5 (Eastern (EST))
  - Summer (DST): UTC-4 (EDT)
- GNBC Code: FDBWR

North Woolwich is an unincorporated rural community in Woolwich Township, Waterloo, Ontario, Canada.

== History ==
Woolwich Township Public School #9 was located in North Woolwich from 1907 to 1963.

North Woolwich had a post office from 1908 to 1913.

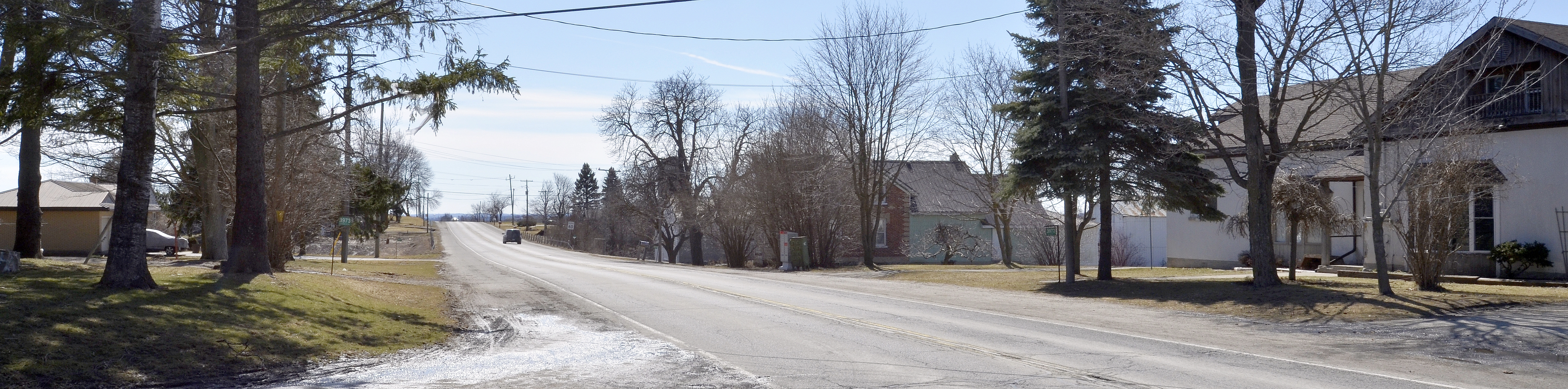
Looking south on County Road 21 in North Woolwich
