= West Montrose Covered Bridge =

Covered bridge in Ontario

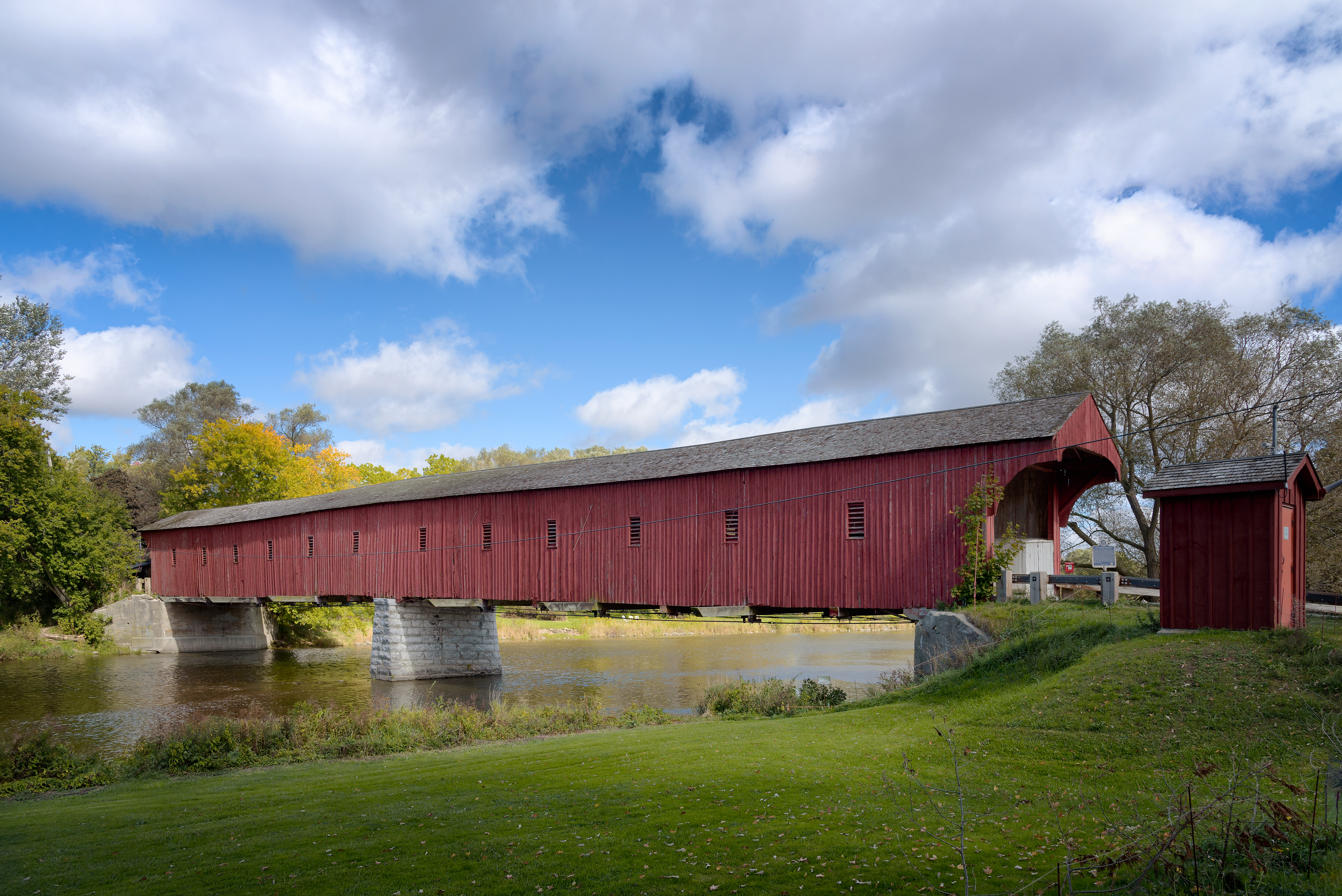
- Coordinates: 43.5855°N 80.4814°W
- Carries: vehicles
- Crosses: Grand River
- Locale: West Montrose, Ontario
- Maintained by: Waterloo Region
- Website: www.explorewaterlooregion.com/listing/west-montrose-covered-bridge/

Characteristics
- Design: covered bridge
- Material: Concrete (piers), metal (truss), wood (sides, some beams)
- Total length: 205 feet (62 m)
- Width: 17 feet (5.2 m)
- No. of spans: 2

History
- Architect: John Bear
- Construction start: 1880
- Construction end: 1881
- Construction cost: $3,197.50 (1881)
- Opened: 1881
- Inaugurated: 1881

Statistics
- Daily traffic: Minimal (3 tonne limit)

Location
- Interactive map of West Montrose Covered Bridge

West Montrose Covered Bridge, also known as the "Kissing Bridge", is a covered bridge in West Montrose, Ontario, within Waterloo Region, one of the oldest covered bridges in Canada. The bridge is the only remaining historic covered bridge in Ontario and the second oldest surviving bridge in the Region of Waterloo. (In 2015, the total number of surviving covered bridges in Canada was below 200.) John Bear, who had previously built barns, built the bridge in 1880–1881, mostly of oak and white pine. The total cost to the Township of Woolwich was $3,197.50. The structure can still be used by pedestrians, buggy traffic and vehicles weighing less than three tonnes for crossing the Grand River. Since 1998, it has been owned and maintained by the Regional Municipality of Waterloo.

The bridge's original design was described as a "two-span hybrid Howe truss" or as a "hybrid Queen Post – Howe timber configuration" with two louvred windows. (Additional windows, visible today, were added at some later date.) The entire structure was originally built of wood. Its weight was supported by 15 piles driven deep into the river bed. At the time of construction, the estimated useful life of the structure was 70 to 80 years. That was significantly increased with subsequent restorations.

The primary modifications during restorations added concrete and steel parts to strengthen the aging structure. However, the current visible form of the bridge remains true to the original design.

== History ==
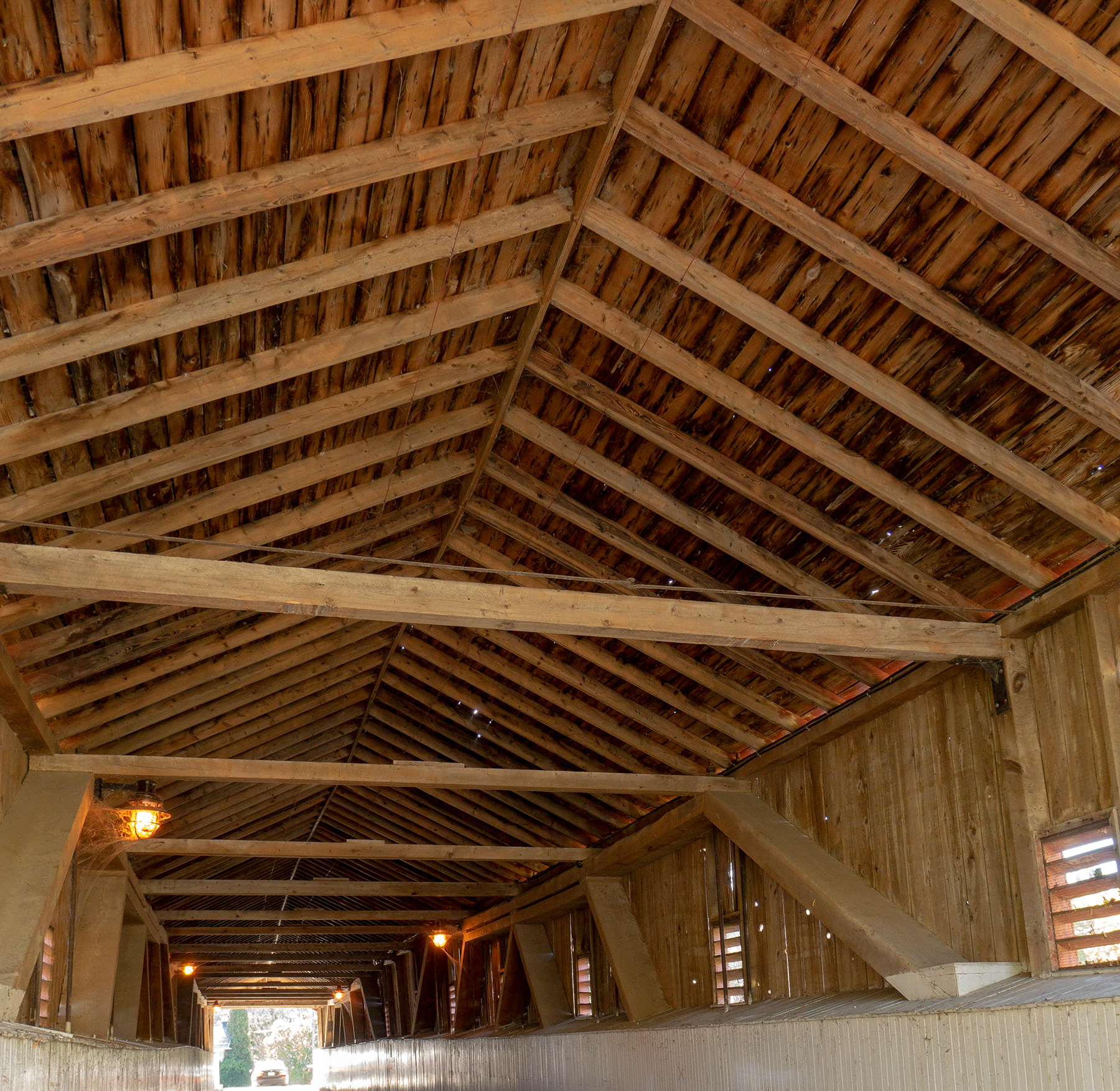
Wooden trusses in the interior

The first records of this bridge include a call for tender in 1880 by John L. Wideman of nearby St. Jacobs, Ontario, for a covered bridge to span the Grand River. The cost would be shared by the Provincial Department of Public Works and the township of Woolwich. The contract was given to the Bear Bros., John and Benjamin. Drawings and five pages of specs were completed by John Bear who indicated that hardwood was used throughout, although the rafters and the sheets over the sides would be made of pine. The wood was obtained from the nearby villages of Bridgeport, Blair and Doon. The opening date of the bridge was 15 November 1881 but it was not painted (with "residual oil and fire proof paint") until May of the following year.

Starting in the mid 1800s, this area of Waterloo County was settled primarily by Mennonite Germans from Pennsylvania. The horse and buggy was the primary transportation and in winter, the wheels were replaced with sleigh runners. This required the township to hire an individual to shovel snow onto the bridge roadway to avoid damage to the flooring. From 1885 until 1950, coal oil lamps were lit inside the bridge overnight; they were replaced by electric bulbs.

This was not the first covered bridge in Waterloo County. The Shingle Bridge in Blair (part of Preston, Ontario) was built before 1835, the first of this type in the area, but was destroyed by flood waters in 1857. By 1900, there were only five covered bridges in all of Ontario and no others in this area.

Several restorations were completed over the years. The wooden abutments were replaced with concrete some time after 1900. In 1904, new planks were laid over the oak floor. New wooden trusses were installed in 1933. In 1955, part of the floor was replaced and covered with crushed stone. In 1959, parts from an old Bailey truss bridge were used to replace the internal structure; metal parts were hidden by pine panels. The roof was re-shingled in 1987 and some beams were replaced in 1995 and 1996. In late 2012 to early 2013, a floor beam replacement and some roof repairs were completed.

In 1959, the township diverted traffic onto the new Highway 86 (now Township Line 86) after constructing a new concrete bridge. This strategy minimized the number of vehicles driving through the small settlement and helped to lengthen the useful life of the covered bridge.

=== The "Kissing Bridge" ===
Locals driving their horse and buggy rigs began to call the structure the "kissing bridge": a kiss (in relative privacy inside the bridge) was required as a toll to cross it. A historical summary indicates that "local girls learned to be wary when their escort's horse stopped inside the bridge without any command from the driver". This is the reason for the name of The Kissing Bridge Trailway for hikers which passes through this settlement.

=== Heritage designations ===
The West Montrose Covered Bridge was designated as a Provincial Historic Site in August 1960. In 2007, the Township of Woolwich designated it as being of cultural heritage value or interest under Part IV of the Ontario Heritage Act (By-law 60-2007). It was listed on the Canadian Register of Historic Places on 28 November 2007.

In 2018, the structure was one of the eight recognized under the region's Heritage Bridge Recognition Program.

== In popular culture ==
The bridge was featured in the film In the Mouth of Madness (1995), and some scenes for It (2017) were filmed around the covered bridge. The latter movie is set in the state of Maine where nine covered bridges still exist.

=== Gallery ===
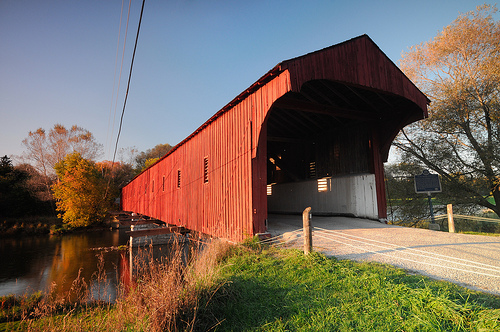
Early morning light (2011)

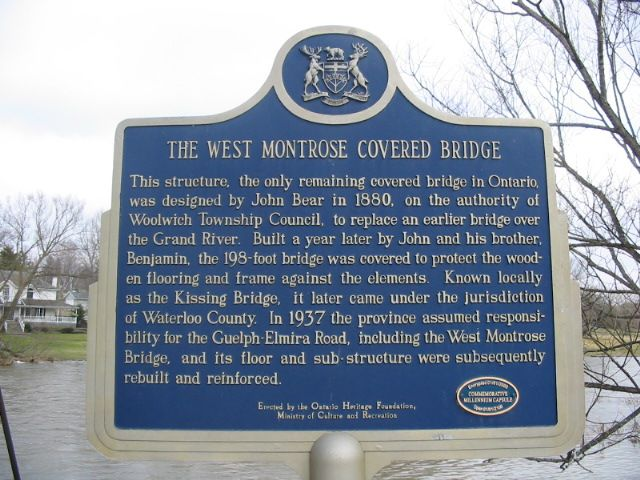
Bridge plaque

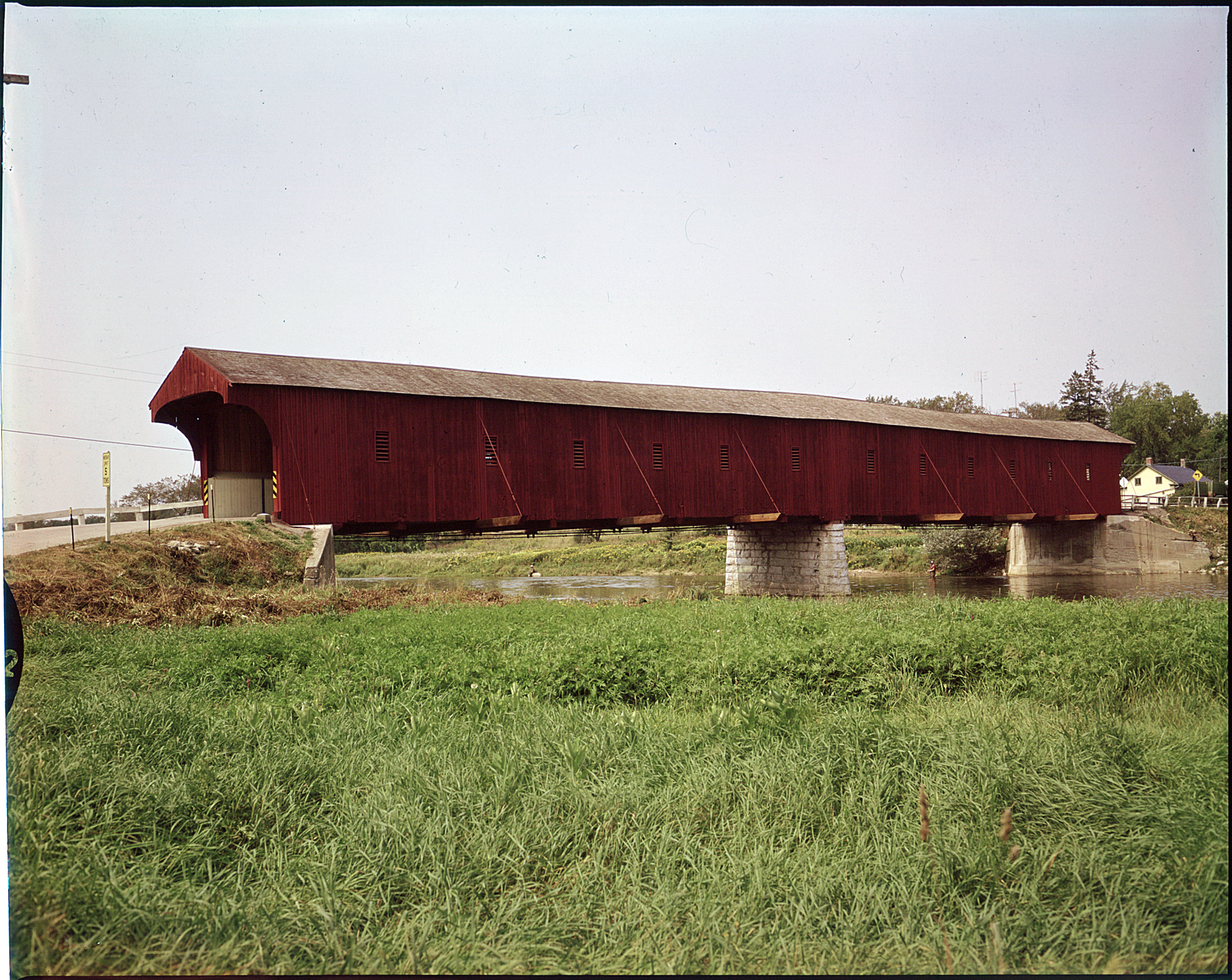
Covered bridge in West Montrose, 1960

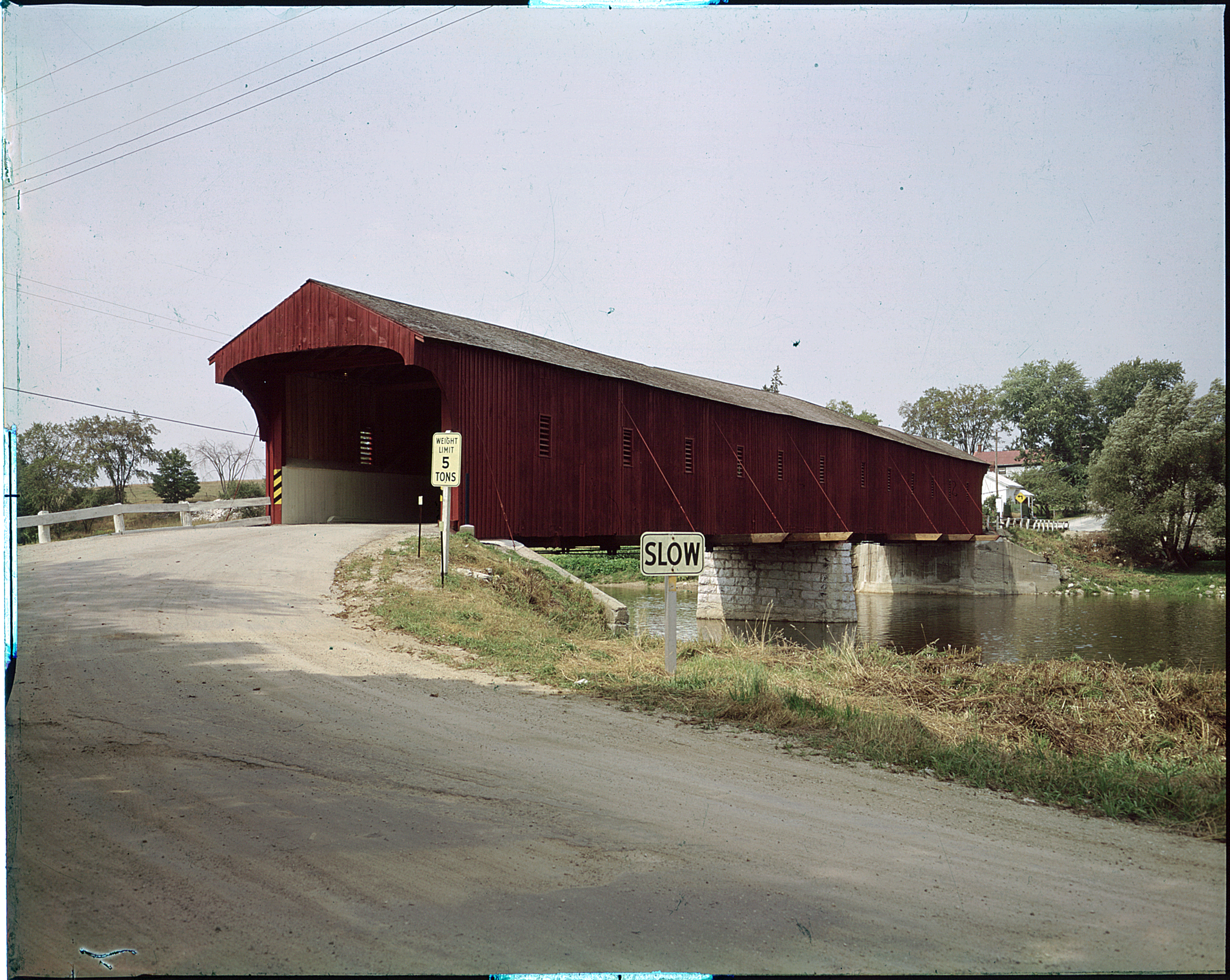
Covered bridge in West Montrose, 1960
