= Weissenburg, Ontario =

Weissenburg
- Unincorporated rural community
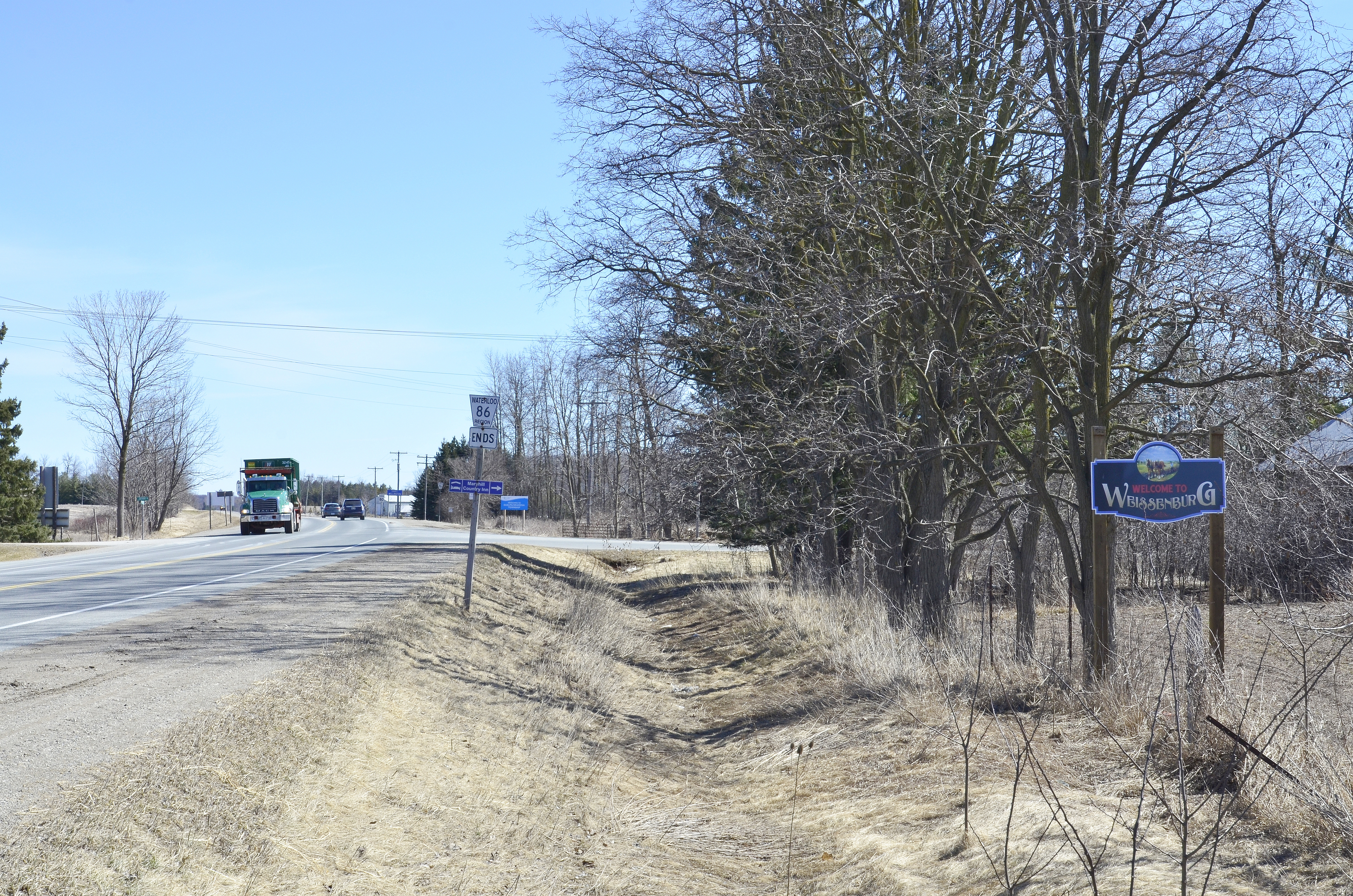
- Looking east on Line 86 in Weissenburg

- Location of Weissenburg in Canada Weissenburg (Southern Ontario)
- Coordinates: 43°34′28″N 80°24′00″W
- Country: Canada
- Province: Ontario
- Region: Waterloo
- Township: Woolwich
- Time zone: UTC-5 (Eastern (EST))
  - Summer (DST): UTC-4 (EDT)
- GNBC Code: FDBWR

Weissenburg is an unincorporated rural community in Woolwich Township, Waterloo, Ontario, Canada.

Weissenburg is located at the crossroads of Line 86 and Sideroad 16.

== History ==
Pioneer farmers and wagon drivers travelling between Woolwich Township and Guelph would stop at Weissenburg to water their horses and refresh themselves.

The pioneer settlement had a tavern, blacksmith shop, grocery store, two hotels, and a nearby school. A post office operated from 1875 to 1913.

In 1910, Weissenburg had daily stage coach service, and a population of about 100.

== See also ==
- List of unincorporated communities in Ontario
