= Winterbourne, Ontario =

Winterbourne
- Unincorporated community
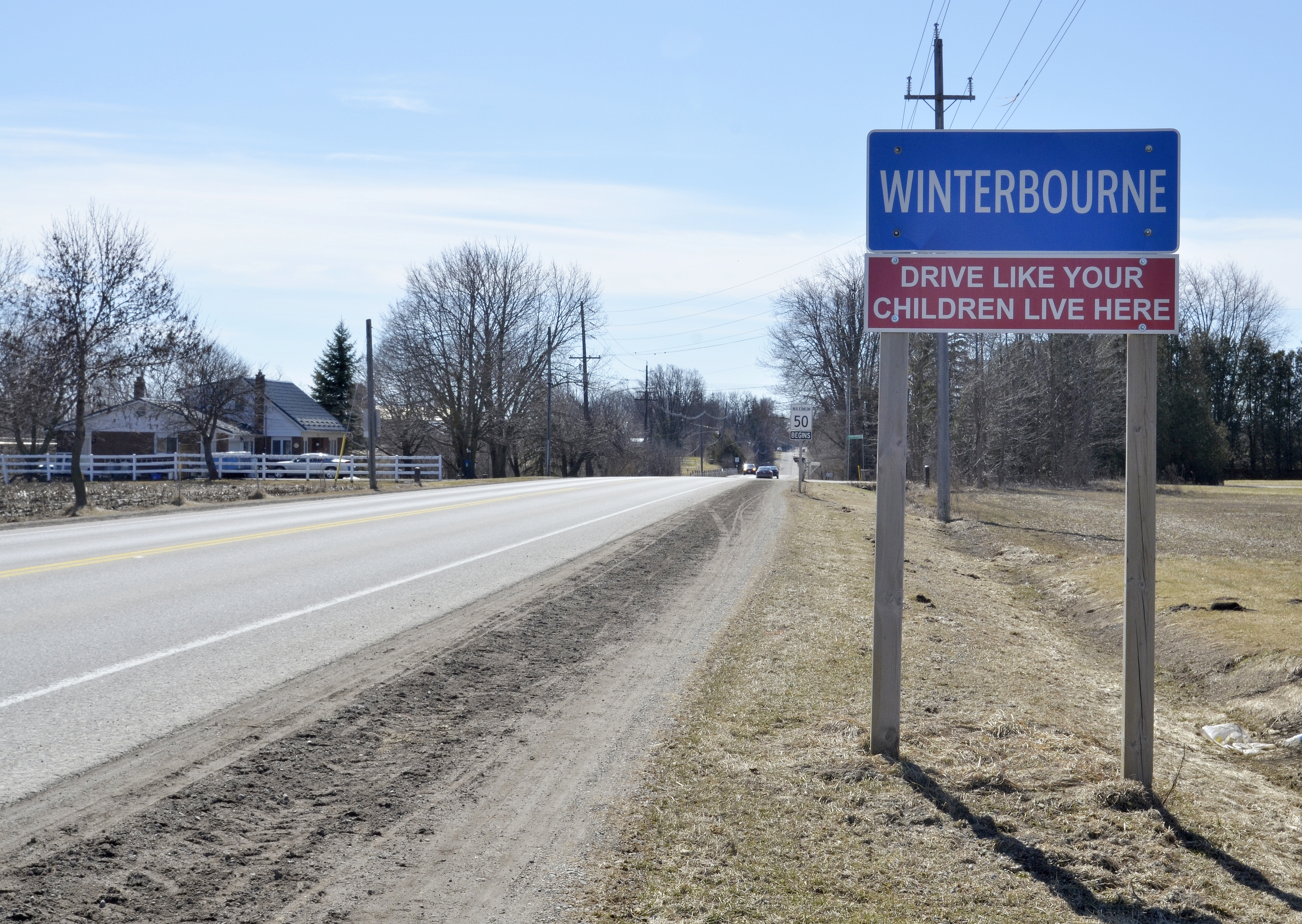
- Looking south on Regional Road 23

- Location within Regional Municipality of Waterloo Location within Southern Ontario
- Coordinates: 43°33′27″N 80°28′16″W
- Country: Canada
- Province: Ontario
- Regional municipality: Waterloo
- Township: Woolwich
- Time zone: UTC-5 (EST)
  - Summer (DST): UTC-4 (EDT)
- Forward sortation area: N0B 2V0
- Area codes: 519 and 226
- NTS Map: 040P09
- GNBC Code: FDELK

Winterbourne (/ˈwɪntərbɜːrn/) is a village located to the east of the Grand River in the township of Woolwich in the Regional Municipality of Waterloo, Ontario, Canada. It is located just northeast of the city of Waterloo. The fine stonework of the Scottish stonemasons can be seen in many of the older buildings throughout the settlement.

== History ==
Although much of Woolwich township was settled by Germanic families, James Crooks purchased a triangular tract of land in Woolwich (than still part of Halton County) in 1821. The Crook's Tract, located east of the Grand River, began to attract dozens of families from England and especially from Scotland. Previously, the tract had few settlers, the most notable a Mr. Cox; the creek which enters the Grand River at what is now Winterbourne was named after him. Immigrants from Scotland began settling the Cox Creek area in 1834, led by John Davidson. He opened the first post office in the township, naming it Lower Woolwich. Captain Henry Lanphier arrived in 1854 and soon built a sawmill and flour mill after damming Cox Creek. Residents agreed with him that the settlement should be renamed Winterbourne, Ontario. (Some records spell the Captain's name as Lamphier.)

By 1837, the Scots established a Church of Scotland, St. Andrews, and in 1844, another group started the Free Presbyterian Church. In 1848, the latter congregation moved from worshipping at the school house to a newly built frame church; that was replaced in 1870 by one built of brick, called Chalmer's Presbyterian. It was not until 1875 that all Presbyterians in Canada united; afterwards, the St. Andrews group joined the Chalmers congregation at the Chalmers sanctuary in Winterbourne. It operated as a place of worship until December 2011. The building, near the Winterbourne Presbyterian Cemetery, is still standing on Katherine Street, and is currently a private home.

An 1864 report indicated that Winterbourne had one store, two hotels, a flour mill and saw mill, two schools and three churches, the Church of Scotland, the Free Church (Chalmers), and Wesleyan Methodist. The population was 200 and the village received mail daily.

== Geography ==
Cox Creek flows through the village. The village is close to the Grand River.

== Demographics ==
In the 2021 Census of Population conducted by Statistics Canada, Winterbourne had a population of 343 living in 115 of its 117 total private dwellings, a change of 9.6% from its 2016 population of 313. With a land area of 0.51 km^{2} (0.20 sq mi), it had a population density of 672.5/km^{2} (1,741.9/sq mi) in 2021.

== Transportation ==
The community's main street is Waterloo Regional Road 23, known as Katherine Street. Winterbourne has never been served by rail.

== Education ==
In 1872, Winterbourne Public School was built in the community. The building was located on large grounds fringed by wooded nature trails. The public school was closed in 2003. In 2006, the Waterloo Region District School Board sold the school for $550,000 to a new private school, Foundation Christian School.

Foundation Christian School opened in September 2006. It serves around 100 students between junior kindergarten and grade 8. The school offers a nondenominational Christian education. The school's curriculum meets Ontario standards and is infused with Christian values and teaching.

== Religion ==
Winterbourne was longed served by Chalmers Presbyterian Church located on the main Katherine Street. The town hall that once stood beside it, fell to ruin and has since been gone. The church in the last years has only seen few visitors and regulars, although all older. Its official last day of service was December 4, 2011. The church was offered for sale in 2012, and a number of local residents, fearing that the church would be purchased then demolished, approached the Township of Woolwich to request that the property be flagged as a potential heritage building, thereby ensuring that there would be public debate should potential owners want to demolish the 1870 building. Woolwich Township did indeed "flag" the building, ensuring that prospective buyers were aware of the cultural and heritage significance of the church.

== See also ==
- List of unincorporated communities in Ontario
