= Woolrich (disambiguation) =

Woolrich is an American clothing company.

Woolrich may also refer to:

- Woolrich (surname)
- Woolrich, Pennsylvania, unincorporated community

== See also ==
- Woolwich (disambiguation)
