= Joseph R. Marbach =

American academic and university administrator

Joseph R. Marbach is an American academic and university administrator who served as the president of Georgian Court University from 2015 to 2025.

== Education ==
Marbach graduated magna cum laude from La Salle University with a B.A in Political Science in 1983. He obtained his a M.A. and Ph.D. in Political Science from Temple University in 1986 and 1993, respectively.

== Career ==
Marbach began his academic career in 2000 at Seton Hall University, where he served as a professor and chair of the Department of Political Science. He later became the acting chair of the Department of African Studies and co-founder of the Center for Community Research and Engagement. From 2006-10, he was appointed dean of the College of Arts and Sciences.

In 2010, Marbach became provost and vice president for academic affairs at La Salle University. He became the president of Georgian Court University on July 1, 2015, and remained in that position until his retirement in 2025.

== Publications ==
=== Books and edited volumes ===
- Marbach, Joseph R., Ellis Katz, and Troy E. Smith, eds. 2006. Federalism in America: An Encyclopedia. Westport, CT: Greenwood Press.
- Marbach, Joseph R., ed. 2004. Opening Cybernetic Frontiers: Cities of the Prairie. New Brunswick, NJ: Transaction.

==== Book chapters and contributions ====
- Marbach, Joseph R. 2009. "History and Politics." In Mapping New Jersey: An Evolving Landscape, eds. Maxine Lurie and Peter O. Wacker. New Brunswick: Rivergate Books, 195–198.
- Marbach, Joseph R. 2003. "Garrett Defeats Sumers in New Jersey's Fifth District Race." In The Roads to Congress, 2002, eds. Sunil Ahuja and Robert Dewhirst. Mansfield, OH: Book Masters, 85–96.
- Marbach, Joseph R. 2001. "Santorum Defeats Klink in Pennsylvania's Senate Race." In The Roads to Congress, 2000, eds. Robert Dewhirst and Sunil Ahuja. Belmont, CA: Wadsworth, 199–211.
- Marbach, Joseph R. 1999. "Smith Defeats Schneider in New Jersey's Fourth District Race." In The Roads to Congress, 1998, eds. Robert Dewhirst and Sunil Ahuja. Belmont, CA: Wadsworth, 13–22.

=== Articles ===
- Marbach, Joseph R. and J. Wesley Leckrone. 2002. "Intergovernmental Lobbying for the Passage of TEA-21." Publius: The Journal of Federalism 32:1 (Winter): 45–64.
- Marbach, Joseph R. 1999. "A Resource Guide to the Study of Contemporary Pennsylvania Politics and Government." Commonwealth: A Journal of Political Science 10: 88–103.
- Marbach, Joseph R. 1999. "Riverboat Gambling in Illinois: A Policy Assessment." Gaming Law Review 3 (2/3): 151–56.
- Marbach, Joseph R. 1999. "Winners or Losers? The Economic Impact of Riverboat Gambling on Joliet, IL and the Quad Cities." Current Politics and Economics of the United States 3 (1): 53–83.

== Personal life ==
Marbach and his wife, Paula, have three children.
