= Wolryche =

Wolryche (/ˈwʊlrɪtʃ/ WUUL-ritch) is an English surname, also occurring as a given name. Notable people with the name include:

== Surname ==
- John Wolryche (1637–1685), English landowner, lawyer and politician
- William Wolryche-Whitmore (1787–1858), English landowner and politician
- Wolryche baronets
  - Sir Thomas Wolryche, 1st Baronet (1598–1668), English landowner and politician

== Given name ==
- Thomas Wolryche Stansfeld (1877–1935), English army officer

== See also ==
- Woolrich (surname)
- Woolwich (disambiguation)
