= Woolwich Township =

Woolwich Township may refer to the following places:

In Canada

- Woolwich, Ontario (Woolwich Township, Regional Municipality of Waterloo)

In the United States

- Woolwich Township, Gloucester County, New Jersey

See also

- Woolwich (disambiguation)
