= Laura McCullough =

American poet

- Born: 1960 (age 65–66); Jersey City, New Jersey
- Education: Goddard College Drew University
- Occupations: Full Professor of English, Brookdale Community College
- Writing career
- Language: English
- Years active: 2006–present
- Genre: Poetry
- Website: www.lauramccullough.org

Laura M. McCullough (born 1960) is an American poet and writer living in the state of New Jersey. McCullough is the author of seven published collections and is the founding editor of Mead: The Magazine of Literature and Libations no longer operating. She did a Ted Talk on post-traumatic growth, "The Drummer, Old Man, & tghe Whale" https://www.youtube.com/watch?v=Q_h5pF_QT2Y. She was awarded a doctoral degree in Medical & Health Humanities from Drew University January 2026. She was a finalist for the 2016 Miller Williams Poetry Prize.

McCullough is also the founder of Jersey Mercy, a celebration of poetic voices during the Light of Day Foundation's Winterfest in Asbury Park, NJ. It is the first poetry event the Light of Day Foundation has hosted since its inception in 2000.

== Early years ==
Laura M. McCullough was born in Jersey City, New Jersey. She attended The Richard Stockton College of New Jersey, from which she holds a Bachelor of Arts degree. Following graduation she attended Goddard College in Plainfield, Vermont, earning a Master of Fine Arts degree in Writing and Literature.

== Academic career ==
McCullough is a Professor of English at Brookdale Community College where she founded the creative writing program. She previously taught at the Richard Stockton College of New Jersey and Ramapo College, and teaches in the Sierra Nevada College low-residency MFA.

== Published work ==
McCullough's poetry, short fiction, and essays have appeared in an array of journals and literary magazines, including The American Poetry Review, The Georgia Review, Prairie Schooner, Green Mountains Review, The Good Men Project, The Writer's Chronicle, JuxtaProse Literary Magazine, Gulf Coast, and Painted Bride Quarterly.

McCullough's second collection of poetry, What Men Want, published in 2008, derives its title from a love poem in the collection, "What Men Really Want." McCullough explained her perspective in a September 2007 interview:

I grew up in a family with only brothers on a street with only boys. Up until recently, I only had sons. My life has been defined by men. The poet, Ross Gay, and I were discussing this one day, and he suggested I am a male-identified woman. I thought that was very interesting. I learned rules of boy culture before I learned the code of girlhood.

In 2013, four more of McCullough's works were published: her fifth full-length book of poetry, Rigger Death & Hoist Another; a fiction chapbook; a short fiction hybrid; and an edited collection of essays on the poet Stephen Dunn (published by Syracuse University Press).

In a 2014 interview with The California Journal of Women Writers, McCullough noted the evolution of her work from poetry towards fiction and her reassertion of a first-person perspective in her work, a perspective missing from her previous full-length poetic work, Panic (2011):

Many of the poems in Panic are emotionally true for me—living in post-911 New Jersey, raising teenage sons, having people in my life with health issues—but none of the poems were written in first person; I wasn’t complicit in any of them, and this began to seem emotionally dishonest.... In Rigger Death & Hoist Another, I tried to keep narrative rebar in the structures of my poems, but re-claim the authorial 'I' in creating the poems and the world view of the poems in relation to each other.

McCullough's 2013 short novella Ripple & Snap borrows heavily on autobiographical themes, examining through the prism of fiction public suicide as a reprise to the self-inflicted death of her boyfriend when McCullough was a teenager. McCullough is working on a non-fiction memoir about the event, attempting "to find a way to tell it true."

In March 2017, McCullough's seventh full-length book of poetry, The Wild Night Dress (University of Arkansas Press), was released. The University of Arkansas Press, which rewarded Laura publication for being a finalist for their 2016 Miller Williams Poetry Prize, states:

Laura McCullough finds passage through the darkest times as she loses, in short order, her mother and her marriage. Through her near unbearable grief, she creates poems that slip between science and nature as she grasps at coordinates in a world spun out of its orbit. From the God Particle to toroidal vortexes, from the slippery linguistics of translation to the translation of the body, McCullough brings readers to the mystery of surrender, and the paradox that what we bear can make us more beautiful, that there is a gift in grief.

== Awards ==
McCullough was the Florida Writers' Circuit 2014/15 poet. She has been a finalist for the Brittingham Prize in Poetry and the Felix Pollak Prize in Poetry, the BOA Editions Isabella Gardner Award, and the Frost Place residency.

In 2016, McCullough became a finalist for the University of Arkansas Press' Miller Williams Poetry Prize, selected by Billy Collins, poet laureate of the United States from 2001 to 2003. Collins praised the collection, saying that, “This poet has the kind of binocular vision that can see the poetic and scientific aspects of the world simultaneously. . . . this shuffling together of lyrical/botanical and medical language is done so gracefully, it has the effect of bringing ‘the two cultures’ into a rare state of peaceful coexistence.”

== On feminism ==
McCullough dislikes the term "feminist," and has criticized the gender exclusivity espoused by certain extreme elements in the organized women's movement:

Many of the men I know who call themselves feminists—some of whom are men I love also exhibit deep self-loathing over their own masculinity because of the shame they have acquired about maleness. How can I embrace something that turns people I love into perpetrators, tyrants, and villains? Yes. It is easy in this culture to forget that women around the world are killed every day, are sold into slavery, are ignored, demeaned, tortured because they are seen as less than human. This is utterly deplorable; its beyond imagining, and yet it is true. But to say that men are evil based on their gender is as single-minded, and wrongheaded in my view, as the worldview that doesn't allow women to be people.

== Works ==
=== Full-length poetry collections ===
- The Dancing Bear. Open Book Press, 2006. ISBN 978-1897290026
- What Men Want: Poems. Gambier, OH: XOXOX Press, 2008. ISBN 978-1880977262
- Speech Acts: Poems. Aspinwall, PA: Black Lawrence Press, 2010. ISBN 978-0982636442
- Panic. Farmington, ME: Alice James Books, 2011. ISBN 978-1882295845
- Rigger Death & Hoist Another. Pittsburgh, PA: Black Lawrence Press, 2013. ISBN 978-1937854294
- Jersey Mercy. Pittsburgh, PA: Black Lawrence Press, 2016. ISBN 978-1-62557-956-0
- The Wild Night Dress. Fayetteville, AR: University of Arkansas Press, 2017. ISBN 978-1-68226-027-2
- Women & Other Hostages. Pittsburgh, PA: Black Lawrence press, 2021. ISBN 978-1625578396

=== Chapbooks and other projects ===
- Elephant Anger. Mudlark, 2007. —prose poems
- Women and Other Hostages. Amsterdam Press, 2010. —poetry
- Ripple & Snap. ELJ Publications, 2013. —short novella and prose poems ISBN 978-0615921075
- The Smashing House. ELJ Publications, 2013. —fiction ISBN 978-0615940243
- The Room and the World: Essays on the Poet Stephen Dunn. (editor) Syracuse, NY: Syracuse University Press, 2013. ISBN 978-0815633358
- Shutters:Voices:Wind. ELJ Publications, 2014. —linked monologues from women around the world ISBN 978-0615963846
- A Sense of Regard: Essays on Poetry and Race. (editor) University of George Press, 2015. ISBN 978-0820347615

== Notes and references ==
- http://www.blacklawrence.com/jersey-mercy/
