= George T. Rockrise =

American Architect

George Thomas Rockrise
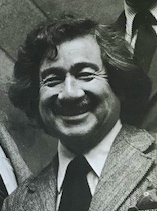
- Born: November 25, 1916
- Died: July 7, 2000 (aged 83)
- Occupation: Architect
- Parents: Iwahiko Tsumanuma; Agnes Margaret Asbury

George Thomas Rockrise, FAIA, ASLA, AICP (November 25, 1916 – July 7, 2000) was an American architect, landscape architect, and urban planner of Japanese and English descent based in San Francisco, California. During his career he practiced both nationally and internationally, had a distinguished career in public service, and received numerous honors and awards.

== Early life and education ==
Rockrise was born in New York City to Iwahiko Tsumanuma (also known as Thomas S. Rockrise, one of the first American-educated Japanese architects in the United States) and Agnes Margaret (Asbury) Rockrise, of Brooklyn, New York. He grew up in New York City and later at Saranac Lake, New York, where his father was under treatment for tuberculosis. In high school he was an Eagle Scout and built and operated his own ham radio.

Rockrise received his Bachelor of Architecture degree from his father's alma mater, Syracuse University in 1938. At that time, the program at Syracuse taught the Beaux Arts method of classical design. While attending Syracuse, Rockrise received several scholarships. Of note was a Flight Training Scholarship from the U.S. Army Air Corps his senior year, leading him to receive his pilot's license upon graduation.

After working a few years in architecture and construction, Rockrise was awarded concurrently a Graduate Fellowship at Columbia University and an Advanced Flight Scholarship from the U.S. Army Air Corps for advanced flight training. With war on the world's horizon, Rockrise made what he considered to be a difficult decision. He chose to decline the Advanced Flight Scholarship, instead to attend Columbia University, where he received his M.S. in Architecture in 1941.

== Career ==
Upon graduating from Columbia University, Rockrise accepted a job in the Canal Zone of Panama, where he was residing when the U.S. entered World War II, December 7, 1941. Rockrise remained in Panama for the duration of the war, working as an architect for the Canal Zone, U.S. Navy, the U.S. Corps of Engineers and the Caribbean Defense Command at various times. He also established a private architectural practice in Panama City. Rockrise was never able to fulfill his desire to fly for the U.S. Navy, as he was repeatedly denied a commission because of his Japanese ancestry.

Returning to New York City after the war, Rockrise went to work for Edward D. Stone, FAIA (’58), who at this time was one of the leading American architects exploring modernism. Rockrise worked on various projects including the El Panama Hotel (Panama City, Panama), coordinating the firm's work with Thomas D. Church, FASLA, in San Francisco, then the country's leading modern landscape architect. As Rockrise stated, “I was chosen to go to San Francisco—and I think this was really the turning point—to coordinate the architectural drawings with Tommy's landscape drawings. Perhaps this was because they had to be done in the metric system, and perhaps because the notes had to be in Spanish, and I spoke Spanish.” Subsequently, Rockrise worked for the architectural, urban planning, and engineering firm, Skidmore, Owings & Merrill, where he was assigned by design partner Gordon Bunshaft, FAIA, to be a staff designer for the United Nations Headquarters Building. As one of the ‘Backroom Boys,’ Rockrise worked under Sven Markelius and Le Corbusier, two of the group of world-renowned architects who designed the United Nations complex. In 1947, Rockrise was invited to become an associate in the landscape architecture office of Thomas D. Church in California. Church is the recognized pioneer in the modernist mid-century landscape style of the day. Among other projects, Rockrise worked with then associate, Lawrence Halprin, FASLA (’69), on the award winning design for the landscaping of the Donnell residence in Sonoma County, California. Rockrise was responsible for the design of the bath house and lanai. The 1948 garden is “famous for its unusual abstracted forms” and is considered a “Modernist icon.” In these early years, 1949–1953, Rockrise also taught at the School of Architecture at the University of California, Berkeley, and was the faculty advisor for the student chapter of the American Institute of Architects (AIA).

In 1950, Rockrise established his own practice in San Francisco. Among the first draftsmen he hired were John Matthew Myers and Robert C. Mountjoy in 1955, who became associates in 1958. Mountjoy's wife, Jan, a former ‘star’ architecture student of Rockrise's at Berkeley, came on as secretary/draftsman. Rockrise's early practice was focused on the design of award-winning residential projects, including:

- Perlman Residence (Squaw Valley, CA 1956), Merit Award, Progressive Architecture Magazine
- Carpenter Residence (Medford, OR, 1955), National Award of Merit, A.I.A.
- Matzinger Residence (Belvedere, CA 1961). Design Award, A.I.A. and House and Home Magazine; Merit Award, A.I.A. and Sunset Magazine
- Gilman Residence (Kent Woodlands, CA 1953) National Award of Merit, A.I.A
- Riley Residence (Atherton, CA 1960) Award of Excellence for Design, Architectural Record Magazine
- Rockrise Residence (Squaw Valley, CA 1957) Design Award, Progressive Architecture Magazine
- Peñaherrera Residence ("La Casita Escondida", Santa Rosa, CA 1958)

"He was one of the leaders of the modern California movement in architecture. His work always showed a Japanese sensitivity to materials and the environment -- a real sensitivity on how to use wood, how to use stone, and how to integrate buildings into the natural site," said Jim Chappell, Assoc. AIA, past president of the San Francisco Planning and Urban Research Association (SPUR).

In 1954, he was invited to Venezuela for several months to assist renowned Venezuelan architect Tomás José Sanabria in the establishment of that country's first school of architecture at the Universidad Nacional. Rockrise also served as a visiting professor and curriculum consultant at the school.

In 1957, Rockrise was commissioned to design the American Consulate in Fukuoka, Japan, in collaboration with the noted architects Hervey Parke Clark, FAIA, and John Beuttler. The job took him to Japan for the first time in the later part of that year and, for the first time, he was able to visit the birthplace of his father (Yamagata) and meet many of his Japanese relatives, among them, his last living aunt.

Rockrise entered into partnership with William J. Watson in 1960, forming the firm, Rockrise and Watson A.I.A. Rockrise and Watson dissolved in 1968.

In 1962, Rockrise collaborated with Lawrence Livingston Jr. and Lawrence Halprin to produce the study, “What to do About Market Street.” It remains the seminal study for the rehabilitation of lower Market Street in San Francisco, resulting in the complete rebuilding of the street during the period 1966-1980.

In 1968, Rockrise formed George T. Rockrise and Associates, with Robert A. Odermatt, FAIA (‘86), Robert C. Mountjoy and James J. Amis, FAIA (‘97), all of whom were associates, becoming principals. The firm later became Rockrise, Odermatt, Mountjoy and Amis (ROMA), and is known today as ROMA Design Group, though none of the original named partners are any longer associated with the firm.

“Perhaps more than any single achievement, George should be commended for advancing an interdisciplinary approach to design…. [His] active involvement in architecture, landscape architecture and planning became reflected in the development of ROMA, which evolved into one of the earliest truly interdisciplinary offices, advocating a team approach to design." According to Mountjoy, “I think the interdisciplinary approach to design was always a part of our practice. Even with residential work there was always collaboration with consultants for structural, mechanical, electrical, landscaping input. Later, in urban design and planning, there were close ties to environmental, transportation, economic and social disciplines.” Odermatt commented, “George Rockrise was a strong believer in a collaborative approach to urban planning and architecture design. Under his leadership, members of collateral design professions such as landscape architecture, structural and mechanical/electrical engineering were engaged as team members early on in the design process. This collaborative approach ensured that the various design disciplines had the opportunity to contribute their knowledge and expertise at the earliest stages of the development of the project's design concept.”

Rockrise retired from ROMA in 1986. He established a solo practice based in Glen Ellen, CA, completing the Wellington Residence & Winery (Glen Ellen, CA), the Paradise Ridge Winery (Santa Rosa, CA), the Sternik Residence (St. Helena, CA), and the Rockrise/Brown residence (Camano Island, WA).

== Personal life ==
In 1948, Rockrise married Margaret (Maggie) Lund Paulson, originally from Oregon and a Stanford graduate, who was the fashion editor of a San Francisco newspaper. In the early 1950s, they had two children, Christina Margaret and Peter Lund. Maggie passed away prematurely in 1957. In 1959, Rockrise married Sally Scott Griffin, with whom he had a daughter, Celia Asbury. The marriage ended in divorce in 1964. In 1988, Rockrise married Anneliese Warner, originally from Garmisch, Germany, who worked for the American Consulate in Munich, Germany. They met while Rockrise was on assignment for the US State Department there in Munich. They purchased a home in Glen Ellen, California, moving there after an extensive remodel.

== Selected works ==
A representative selection of projects George Rockrise worked on include the following:

- Married Student Housing, University of California, San Francisco Medical Center (San Francisco, CA), 1960. Honor Awards; A.I.A., Life Magazine and House and Home Magazine
- Matzinger Residence (Belvedere, CA) 1961. Merit Awards; A.I.A. and Sunset, Design Awards; A.I.A. and House and Home Magazine
- Bomberger Residence (Kent Woodlands, CA) 1961. Merit Awards; A.I.A. and Sunset
- Married Student Housing, University of California, Davis Campus (Davis, CA), 1962. Honor Awards; A.I.A., Life Magazine and House and Home Magazine
- Tacoma Urban Renewal Plan (Tacoma, WA), 1963
- Stanford Research Institute Development Plan (Palo Alto, CA) 1963
- Sausalito Firehouse (Sausalito, CA) 1964
- Algarve New Town Plan (Portugal) 1965
- U.S. Atomic Energy Commission Theoretical and Computation Building (Livermore, CA) 1965
- Chico State College Master Plan (Chico, CA) 1965
- Salem Plaza Shopping Center (Salem, OR) 1966
- Ames Research Center Master Plan (NASA) (Moffett Field, CA) 1966
- Cathedral School for Boys (San Francisco, CA) ~1967
- Peñaherrera Residence ("La Casita Escondida", Santa Rosa, CA 1958.)

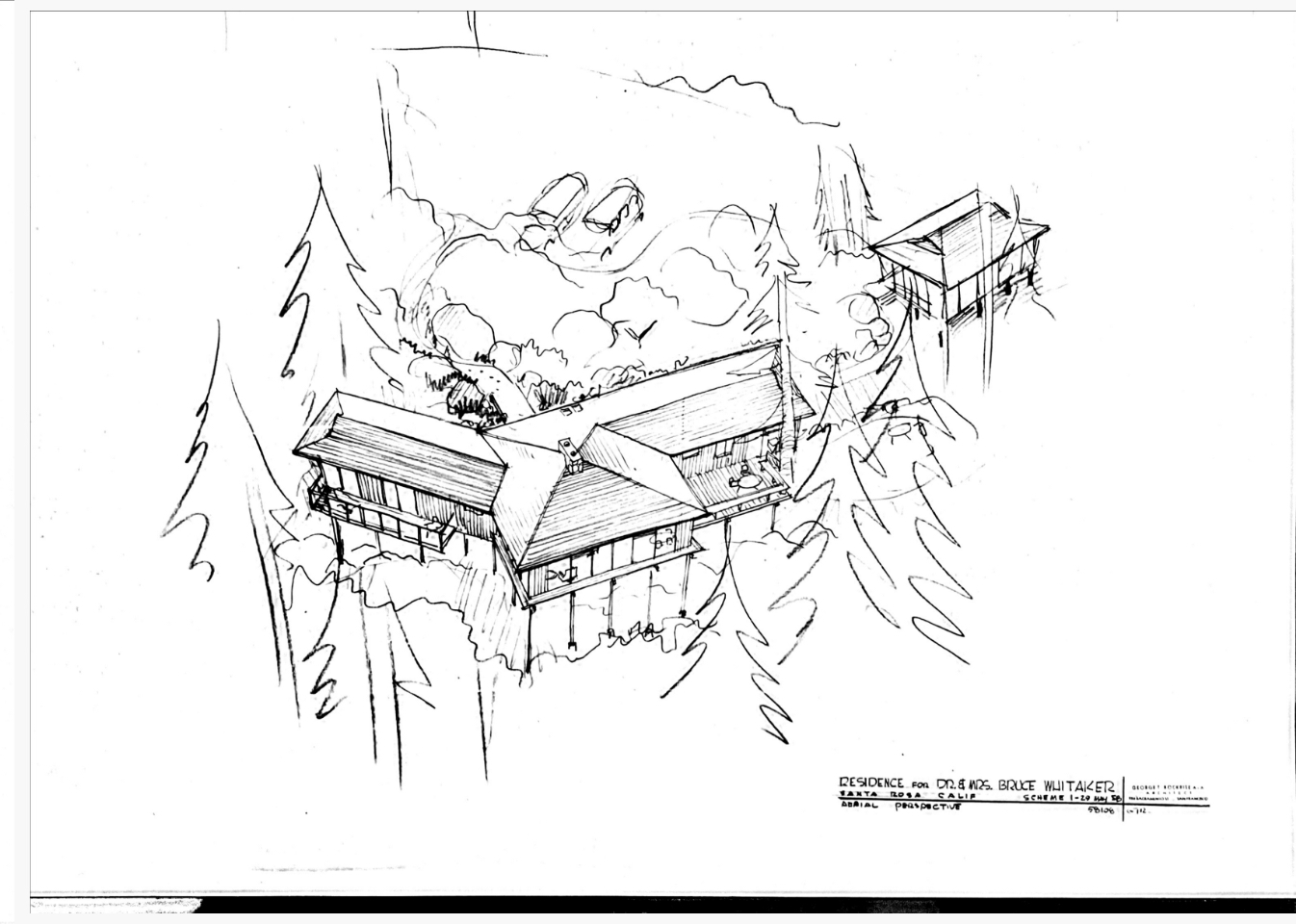
Peñaherrera Residence (La Casita Escondida), Santa Rosa CA.

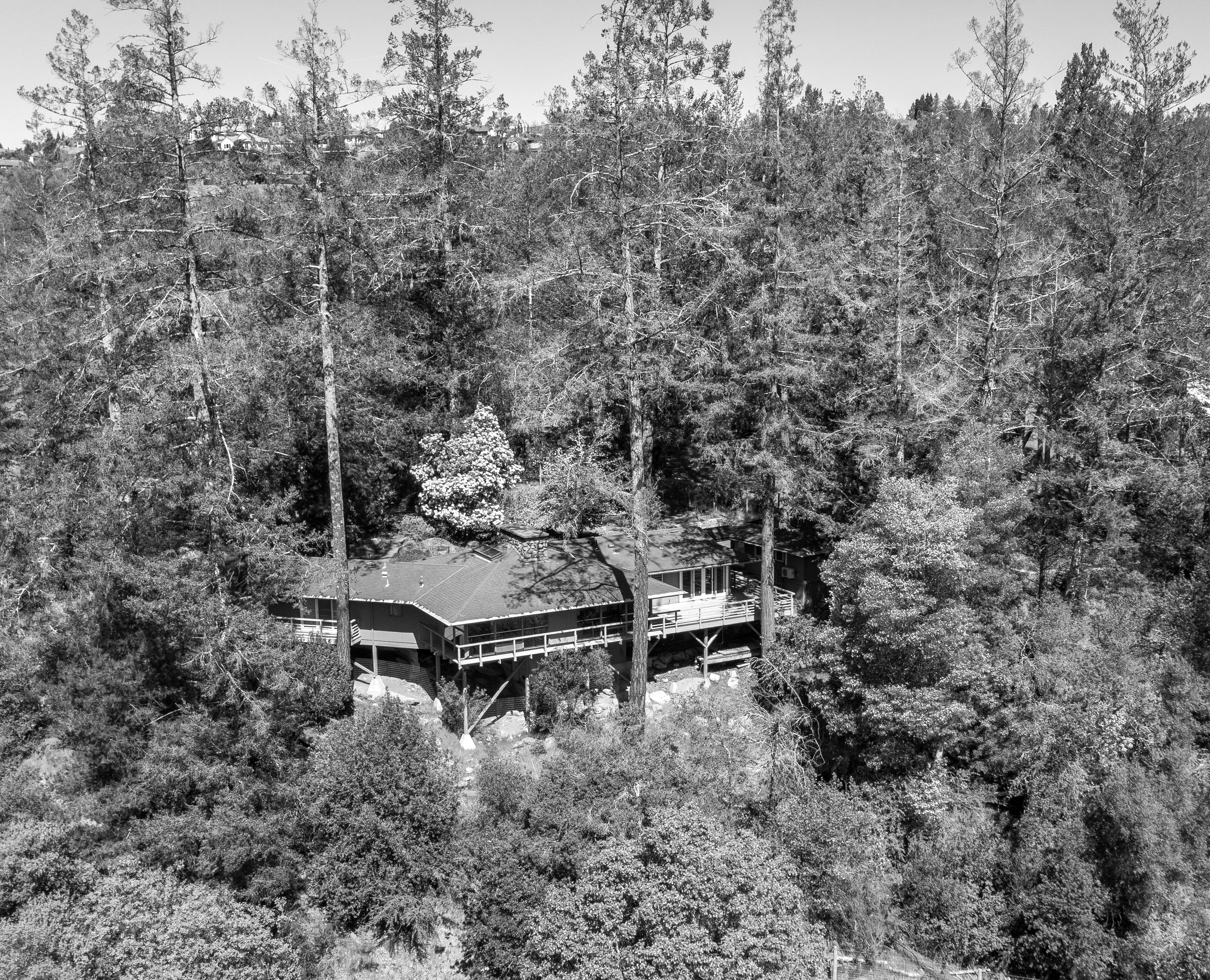
Peñaherrera Residence (La Casita Escondida), Santa Rosa CA.

Over the course of Rockrise's career at ROMA, the firm provided architectural, urban design and development consulting for more than 40 west coast cities and various federal, state and local agencies. A sampling of representative projects, both public and private, includes:

- Pike Plaza Urban Renewal Project (Seattle, WA) 1968
- Sun River Lodge and Master Plan (Sunriver, OR) with RHBA. 1968 & 1969. National Award of Merit, A.S.L.A and Award for Excellence for Design, Western Wood Products Assoc.
- Eugene Mall (Eugene, OR) 1971. National Award of Merit, A.S.L.A. and Downtown Development Award, City of Eugene Central
- Salem Development Plan (Salem, OR) 1971
- Palo Alto Beautification Plan (Palo Alto, CA) 1974
- Seattle Central Waterfront Plan (Seattle, WA) 1971
- Domaine Chandon Winery (Yountville, CA) 1977. Award of Honor for Design Excellence, N. Calif. Chapter A.I.A
- National Park Service, Grand Canyon National Park South Rim Master Plan (AZ) 1974
- Stephens Institute of Technology, Science and Engineering Complex (Hoboken, NJ) 1969
- Westin Hotel at Cascade Village (Vail, CO) ~1980
- American Embassy (Manama, Bahrain) 1982

== Public service, honors and awards ==
Rockrise was elected a Fellow of the American Institute of Architects (1963) and of the Institute of Design Professionals of Great Britain. Service with the American Institute of Architects (AIA) included Northern California Chapter Vice-President (1960) and President (1961), Director of the California Council (1961), National Vice President (1969-1972), Chair of the Task Force on Social Responsibility, Trustee for the Urban Design and Development Corporation, and several design juries.

As a licensed landscape architect, Rockrise was also a member of the American Society of Landscape Architects (ASLA) and received the Distinguished Service Citation for Contributions to the Environment in 1967. He was also licensed as a professional planner, and as a charter member of the American Institute of Certified Planners (AICP) served as chair of the Urban Design Committee.

Rockrise was known for his distinguished public service and as a teacher and lecturer in Architecture, Urban Design and related social issues affecting the design professions. In addition to his early teaching at the University of California, Rockrise guest lectured, taught or spoke widely at, among others, the Universidad Nacional, Escuela de Arquitectura y Urbanismo (Caracas, Venezuela), University of Pennsylvania, Stevens Institute of Technology (Hoboken, NJ), Ministerio de Obras Publicas (Madrid, Spain), Agency for International Development (AID), Colegio de Ingenieros de Honduras (Teguicigalapa, Honduras), University of Oregon, Tuskegee Institute, Ecole Americain (Fontainbleau, France), British Universities of Bristol, Sheffield and Aberystwth, XVI Congreso Panamericano de Architectos (Caracas, Venezuela), Universidad Central (Mexico). He was a visiting lecturer (1962-1963) in planning and urban design at Stanford University.

While serving as National Vice President for the AIA (1969–1972), Rockrise chaired a task force that secured a $1 million Ford Foundation grant for scholarships for African American students to attend architectural schools and innovated the concept of ‘urban design workshops,’ that would later come to be called Community Design Centers (CDC), where students gained practical professional experience. An outgrowth of this work was his appointment as chair of the Technical Assistance Team of the Southwest Council of La Raza to work with the Ford Foundation in securing grants for housing assistance for Chicano barrios (communities) in the southwest.

In 1966, Rockrise was appointed by Robert Weaver, Secretary of the newly formed Department of Housing and Urban Development (HUD) to be the first Special Advisor for Design during President Johnson's Great Society initiative. Rockrise also served on the Reynolds Community Architecture Jury (1969), a distinguished group that visited, evaluated and recognized the best new towns worldwide, including Brasilia (Brazil) and Chandigarh (India). Rockrise served as a consultant to the U.S. State Department to evaluate and masterplan for diplomatic missions particularly regarding antiterrorism. Rockrise evaluated United States diplomatic facilities in Germany, Brazil, Venezuela and Dhahran (Saudi Arabia) .

Other public service included terms on the San Francisco Art Commission (1953–1956, 1986–1987), the San Francisco Planning Commission (1961–1962), and the Executive Committee, Board of Directors, and Advisory Council of SPUR (San Francisco Planning and Urban Research Association).

Rockrise received a Senior Fulbright Fellowship in 1978 and 1979 and was attached to the University of Rome, Italy. During his career he also received two NEA (National Endowment for the Arts) grants. In 1995, he received his last award from San Francisco Bay Area Planning and Urban Research Association (SPUR) which honored him “for his dedication to enhancing the quality of life and economic vitality” in San Francisco.”
