= Bill Hill (American football) =

American football player (born 1959)

No. 29, 31
- Position: Cornerback

Personal information
- Born: April 21, 1959 (age 67); Neptune Township, New Jersey, U.S.
- Listed height: 5 ft 9 in (1.75 m)
- Listed weight: 172 lb (78 kg)

Career information
- High school: Howell (NJ)
- College: Rutgers
- NFL draft: 1981: undrafted

Career history
- Cleveland Browns (1981)*; New Jersey Generals (1985); Dallas Cowboys (1987)
- * Offseason or practice squad member only

Career NFL statistics
- Games played: 3
- Stats at Pro Football Reference

William Hill (born April 21, 1959) is an American former professional football player who was a cornerback for the Dallas Cowboys of the National Football League (NFL). He also was a member of the New Jersey Generals of the United States Football League (USFL). He played college football for the Rutgers Scarlet Knights.

== Early life ==
Hill attended Howell High School, where he played football and baseball. As a sophomore in 1974, he was named the starting running back. As a senior, he received All-Monmouth honors.

He recorded more than 1,000 rushing yards in three straight seasons, finishing his high school career with 3,147 rushing yards, 228 scored points and a punting average of 41.3 yards.

== College career ==
Hill accepted a football scholarship from the University of Virginia. He left the school after suffering an injury and enrolled at Brookdale Community College to focus on playing baseball. As a sophomore in 1979, he received honorable-mention All-American honors as an outfielder and was selected by the New York Mets in the 16th round (#392 overall) of the 1979 Amateur Entry Draft.

After participating one season in the New York–Penn League, he walked-on at Rutgers University, to practice football under head coach Frank R. Burns. In his only season with the team in 1980, he played cornerback, while registering 37 tackles, one interception, one carry for 13 yards and 8 kickoff returns for 177 yards (22.1-yard avg.).

== Professional career ==
=== Cleveland Browns ===
Hill was signed as an undrafted free agent by the Cleveland Browns after the 1981 NFL draft. He was released before the start of the season.

=== New Jersey Generals (USFL) ===
On January 15, 1985, he signed as a free agent with the New Jersey Generals of the United States Football League. He was later released and re-signed on March 21. He started in some of the games at cornerback. He didn't get a chance to play in 1986 after the league folded.

=== Dallas Cowboys ===
After the NFLPA strike was declared on the third week of the 1987 season, those contests were canceled (reducing the 16-game season to 15) and the NFL decided that the games would be played with replacement players. In September, he was signed to be a part of the Dallas Cowboys replacement team that was given the mock name "Rhinestone Cowboys" by the media. He was the backup at right cornerback behind Robert Williams in two games. He started the fifth game against the Washington Redskins at right cornerback. He was released after the strike ended on October 26.

== Personal life ==
Hill was a football head coach at Toms River High School South, Asbury Park High School, and Howell High School.
