= Brookdale Community College =

Public college in Lincroft, New Jersey, US

- Type: Public community college
- Established: 1967
- Academic affiliations: Sea-grant, space-grant
- President: David M. Stout
- Students: 10,195 (Fall 2025)
- Location: Lincroft, New Jersey, United States; 40.326°N 74.132°W
- Campus: Suburban
- Colors: Navy, Scarlet, White
- Nickname: Jersey Blues
- Website: www.brookdalecc.edu

Brookdale Community College is a public community college in the Lincroft section of Middletown Township, in Monmouth County, in the U.S. state of New Jersey. Founded in 1967, the college also has regional locations in Neptune Township, Freehold Township, Long Branch, and Wall Township.

Brookdale Community College was established in 1967 when the Monmouth County Board of Chosen Freeholders decided to create a community college for local residents. The board acquired most of the Brookdale Farm property in Lincroft in 1968, and classes began in 1969 with just over 300 students and 50 faculty members.

Brookdale is an open-admission college that admits anyone 18 years of age or older, or anyone who is a high school graduate or holder of an equivalency diploma. The college also offers courses to qualified high school students through its Dual Enrollment Program. It serves the residents of Monmouth County, and the surrounding communities. Brookdale Community College has an enrollment of nearly 10,000 students. The college offers associate degrees in more than 68 programs, as well as non-degree/non-credit classes and certificate programs.

== History ==
In 1967, the Monmouth County Board of Chosen Freeholders decided to form a community college for the benefit of Monmouth county residents. For this purpose, the 800-acre Brookdale Farm in Lincroft was acquired from Lewis S. Thompson Jr. in 1968. Classes were first offered in 1969.

On July 24, 2012, College President Peter F. Burnham, who had retired from a 20-year tenure after corruption allegations surfaced, pleaded guilty to two indictable (felony) counts of official misconduct and one count of theft by deception in a plea agreement that called for a five-year prison term. Five months later, he was sentenced to a 5-year-prison-term and ordered to make financial restitution to the college.

The college announced on October 5, 2022, that its Hazlet campus had been sold and that the college would seek to open a new branch campus in the region.

== Lincroft campus ==
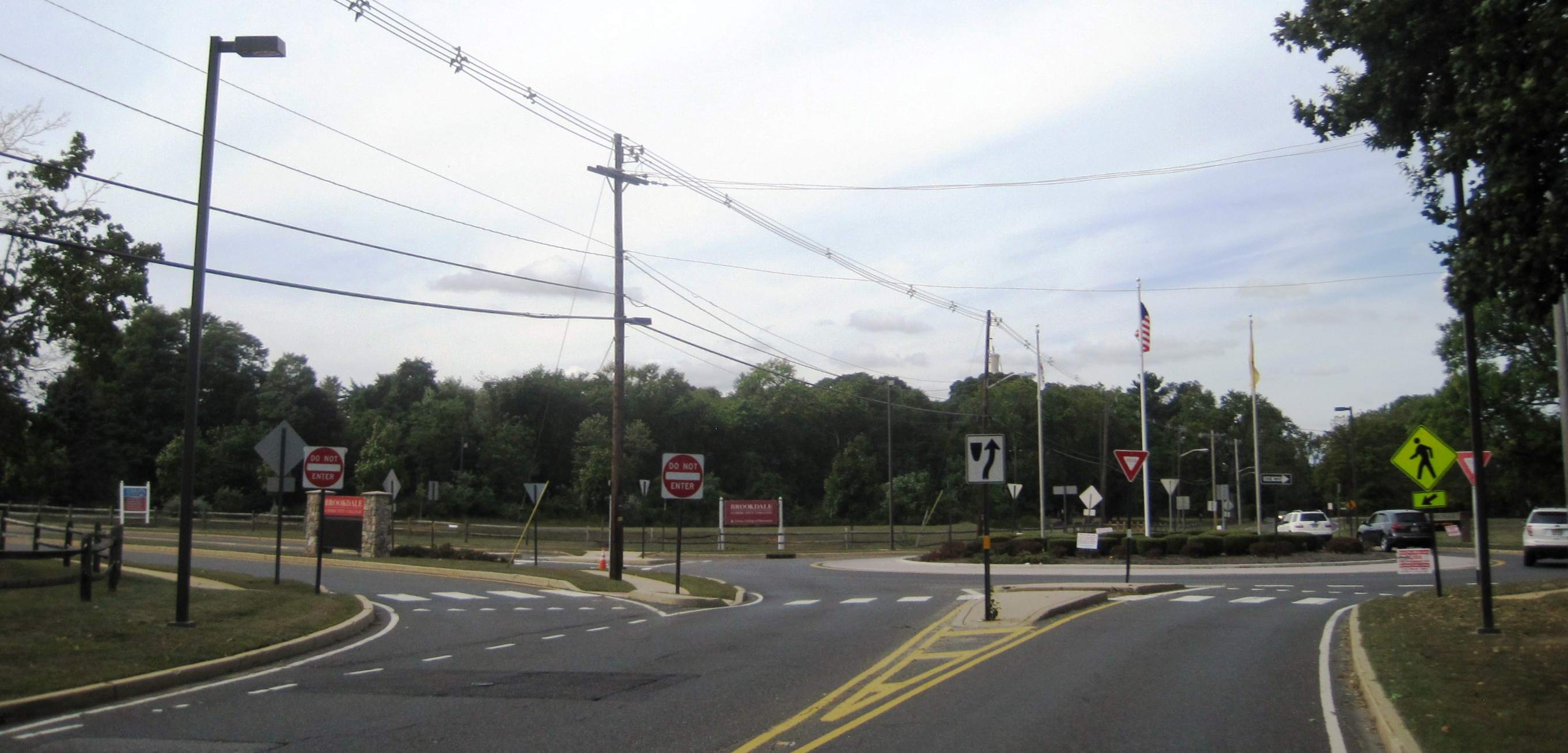
Main entrance to the campus from the Route 520 roundabout

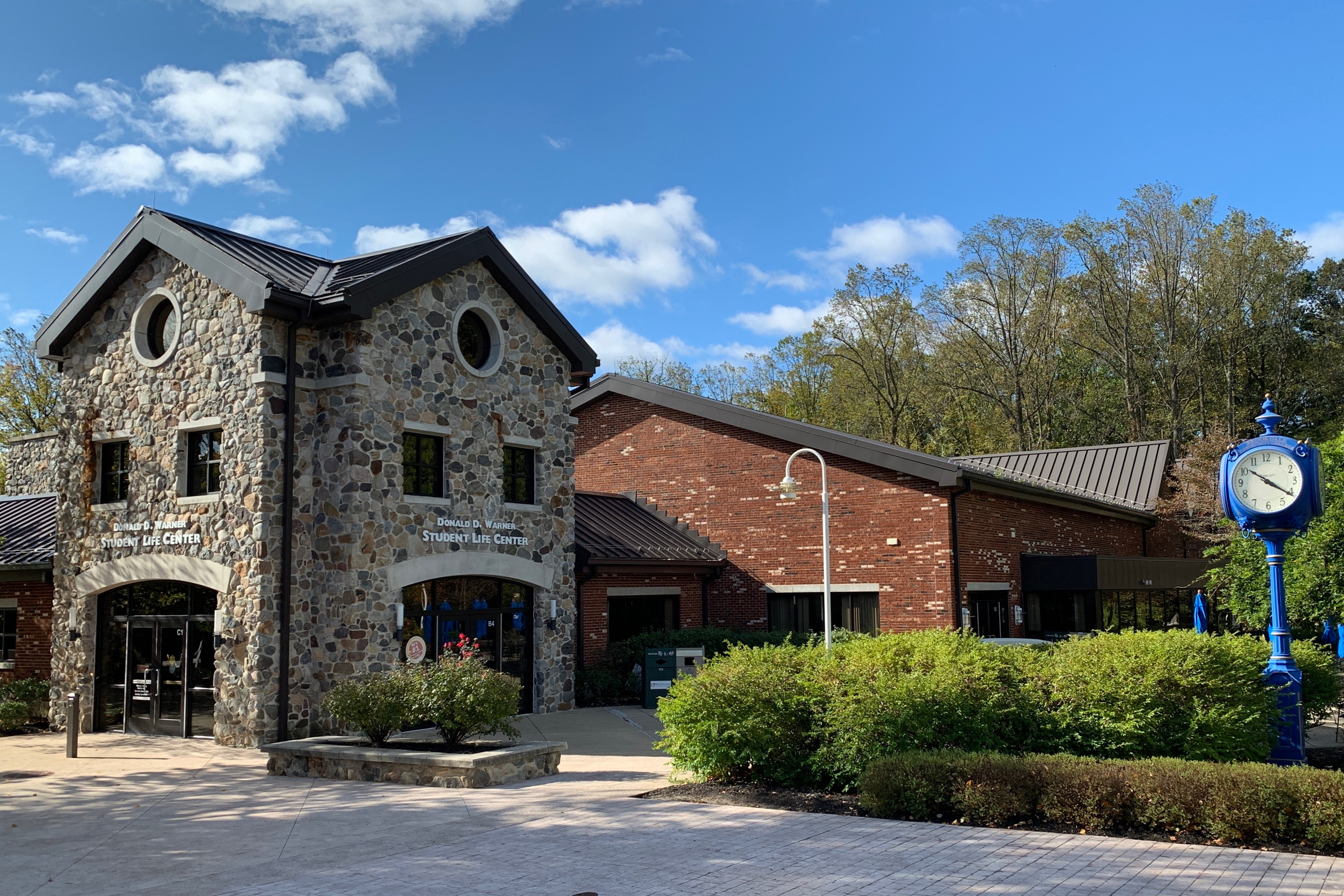
The Donald D. Warner Student Life Center at the Lincroft campus

The Lincroft campus in Middletown consists of 22 buildings, including the Center for the Visual Arts, the Center for World War II Studies, and the Donald D. Warner Student Life Center. The newly renovated Robert J. Collins Arena/Brookdale Recreation and Events Center holds special events, including conventions, concerts, and athletic competitions.

High Technology High School, a magnet school for students from Monmouth County, is located near the eastern edge of the Lincroft Campus. It is operated by the Monmouth County Vocational School District.

The Lincroft campus is home to the Brookdale Performing Arts Center and Brookdale Public Radio (WBJB-FM). These institutions offer performances, National Public Radio programming, and music.

== Athletics ==
The Department of Athletics, Recreation, and Intramurals provides a diverse range of programs. Brookdale's intercollegiate program is nationally recognized. The Jersey Blues teams compete in the Garden State Athletic Conference and in Region XIX of the National Junior College Athletic Association. The program has won eight NJCAA Division III National titles: softball (2002, 2005 and 2010), women's soccer (2013, 2014 and 2015) and men's basketball (2013 and 2018).

Sports teams

- Men's and Women's Cross Country
- Men's and Women's Soccer
- Men's and Women's Tennis
- Men's and Women's Basketball
- Baseball
- Softball
- Cheerleading
- Men and Women's Volleyball

== Student clubs and organizations ==
There are approximately 60 recognized student organizations at Brookdale Community College. Clubs and organizations are recognized by the Student Life Board, Brookdale's student government, and must re-register every year with the department of Student Life and Activities.

== University partnerships ==
Brookdale has institutional partnerships with Georgian Court University, New Jersey City University, and Rutgers University.

== Center for World War II Studies and Conflict Resolution ==
The Center for World War II Studies and Conflict Resolution is dedicated to fostering the study of the historical, political, social, economic, cultural and military aspects of the World War II era up through the Korean War. The Center examines the key events of the time; the political and military leaders who waged the wars, provided the leadership, made the peace; and those who served on the battlefield and home front.

== Notable people ==
=== Faculty and staff ===
- Monica Aksamit (born 1990), saber fencer who won a bronze medal at the 2016 Summer Olympics in the Women's Saber Team competition
- Jeffrey Ford (born 1955), fantasy, science fiction and mystery author, who is a recipient of the Edgar Allan Poe Award, the Nebula Award and the World Fantasy Award
- Laura McCullough (born 1960), author and poet
- Sally Priesand (born 1946), America's first female rabbi, who is on the board of the Center for Holocaust Studies at Brookdale
- Dan Tomasulo (born 1951), counseling psychologist, author, and professor
- William John Watkins (born 1942), science fiction writer and Rhysling award-winning poet

=== Alumni ===
- Lou Brutus (born 1972), radio host, musician and photographer
- Deena Nicole Cortese (born 1987), cast member on the reality shows Jersey Shore and Jersey Shore: Family Vacation
- Dean Ehehalt (born 1964), head coach of the Monmouth Hawks baseball team
- Brian Hanlon, sculptor
- Bill Hill (born 1959), former NFL cornerback for the Dallas Cowboys
- Jim Hunter (born 1959), formerly of CBS Sports and currently a broadcaster on the Mid-Atlantic Sports Network that covers the Major League Baseball's Baltimore Orioles
- Rob Lukachyk (born 1968), former Major League Baseball player who played briefly for the Montreal Expos during their 1996 season
- John Montefusco (born 1950), former Major League Baseball pitcher from 1974 to 1986 who played for the San Francisco Giants, Atlanta Braves, San Diego Padres and New York Yankees
- Nicole "Snooki" Polizzi (LaValle) (born 1987), reality television star of Jersey Shore, Dancing With the Stars, Celebrity Apprentice, Fear Factor, Snooki & JWoww, Nicole & Jionni's Shore Flip, & Jersey Shore: Family Vacation
- Dave Rible (born 1967), Director of the New Jersey Division of Alcoholic Beverage Control, who previously served in the New Jersey General Assembly
- Alex Skuby (born 1972), actor best known for appearing on King of Queens
- Kevin Smith (born 1970), film director, screenwriter, and actor, perhaps best known for the cult classic Clerks. Brookdale's Criminal Justice degree program was mentioned during the jail scene in his film Clerks 2. He received an Associate of Letters degree in 2007
- Mike "The Situation" Sorrentino (born 1982), Reality-TV star of Jersey Shore, Dancing With the Stars, Celebrity Big Brother (UK), The Sorrentinos, Marriage Boot Camp, and Jersey Shore: Family Vacation
- James Urbaniak (born 1963), actor of film, stage, and voice. Portrays Dr. Venture, amongst other characters, on The Venture Brothers
- Denny Walling (born 1954), Major League Baseball third baseman for the Houston Astros
- Brian Williams (born 1959), former anchor and managing editor of NBC Nightly News
- Madlyn-Ann C. Woolwich (born 1937), pastel and impressionist painter and author of several books and articles.
- Jack Yonezuka (born 2003), judoka who competed in the 2024 Summer Olympics

== See also ==
- List of New Jersey County Colleges
