= Dan Tomasulo =

American psychologist (born 1951)

Dr Dan Tomasulo
- Born: Daniel Joseph Tomasulo; July 20, 1951 (age 75); New York City, New York, U.S.
- Education: Springfield College (B.S.), Fairleigh Dickinson University (M.A.), Yeshiva University (Ph.D.), The New School (M.F.A.), University of Pennsylvania (M.A.P.P.)
- Scientific career
- Fields: Positive psychology, psychodrama, intellectual disability, psychotherapy
- Workplaces: Columbia University Teachers College, University of Pennsylvania
- Website: www.dantomasulo.com

Daniel Joseph Tomasulo (born July 20, 1951) is an American counseling psychologist, writer, and professor and the Academic Director and core faculty at the Spirituality Mind Body Institute (SMBI), Teachers College, Columbia University. He holds a Ph.D. in psychology, MFA in writing, and a Master of Applied Positive Psychology from the University of Pennsylvania, and was formerly the Director of the New York City Certification in Positive Psychology for the New York Open Center. He is also a Review Editor for Frontiers in Psychology's special section on Positive Psychology and The Journal of Positive Psychology. He received the 2021 Teachers College, Columbia University Teaching Award.

His clinical specialization is in psychodrama and sociometry, with an academic specialization in the science of hope. Tomasulo developed Interactive Behavioral Therapy (IBT) and later Positive-Interactive Behavioral Therapy (P-IBT), forms of group psychotherapy for people with intellectual disabilities, and coauthored the American Psychological Association's first book on the subject: Healing Trauma: The Power of Group Treatment for People with Intellectual Disabilities (2005) with Nancy Razza. Tomasulo is also the author of: Action Methods in Group Psychotherapy: Practical Aspects (1998), Confessions of a Former Child: A Therapist's Memoir (2008), American Snake Pit (2018), Learned Hopefulness, The Power of Positivity To Overcome Depression" (2020), and "The Positivity Effect: Simple CBT Skills to Transform Anxiety and Negativity into Optimism and Hope" (2023). He is also coauthor of Character Strengths and Abilities Within Disabilities: Science and Practice with Ryan Niemiec, the first book devoted to the science and practice of character strengths and disabilities.

== Education and career ==
Tomasulo was born in New York City and raised in Waldwick, New Jersey, with an Irish mother and Italian father. He earned a B.S. in psychology from Springfield College in 1973, an M.A. in child development from Fairleigh Dickinson University in 1976, and a Ph.D. in developmental psychology from Yeshiva University in 1981. Tomasulo began his study of psychodrama and group therapy in 1980 with Jacquie Siroka and Bob Siroka. He was hired at Brookdale Community College in 1980 where he won the Master Teacher award and became professor of psychology. He worked there until 2001 and then moved to New Jersey City University where he developed the first online psychology courses and later the first permanent positive psychology course in the New Jersey state system. In 1998–99 he was a teaching fellow at Princeton University under the mentorship of John M. Darley in the psychology department and studied with Tony Award-winning playwright Christopher Durang. He won two international reTHINK Theatre playwriting competitions for his plays on mental health: Negatively Oriented Therapy N.O.T. (2012) and Sticks, Stones and the R Word (2010). Both plays premiered in Auckland, New Zealand.

Mentored by the author Dani Shapiro, Tomasulo studied creative nonfiction and earned an M.F.A. from The New School in 2001. He won the New School MFA Chapbook Competition for his essay "Kettle of Fish," and later studied in the Master of Applied Positive Psychology (M.A.P.P.) at the University of Pennsylvania. In 2012, he became an assistant instructor for Martin Seligman, the Father of Positive Psychology, and James Pawelski, Director of Education and Senior Scholar at the Positive Psychology Center. He was the first psychologist and psychodramatist to graduate from the program and join the teaching staff. He developed the Positive Psychology and Healing Power of Hope courses at Teachers College Columbia University in 2014 and became the Academic Director for the Spirituality Mind Body Institute in 2020. He developed the first psychodrama course taught at Teachers College, Columbia, since the founder of psychodrama, Jacob Levy Moreno, introduced it to the campus in 1937.

ShareCare identifies him as one of the top ten online influencers on the topic of depression. In 2025, he was awarded the Outstanding Practitioner Award by the International Positive Psychology Association.

In 1986, Tomasulo became licensed as a counseling psychologist in New Jersey. In 2005, he and Nancy Razza became the first psychologists to be given the New Jersey Healthcare Providers of the Year award for their work with people with intellectual disabilities. The American Society of Group Psychotherapy and Psychodrama awarded him the David A. Kipper Scholar's Award for research and their Innovators Award for his clinical work in psychodrama with developmentally disabled people. During 1992–2010, he served as contributing editor of their journal and in 2015 was guest editor for the New Jersey Psychologist Special Edition on Positive Psychology. His second memoir, American Snake Pit: Hope, Grit, and Resilience in the Wake of Willowbrook was published in 2018. In this memoir, Tomasulo chronicles the first experimental group home for the treatment of mentally ill patients coming from the infamous Willowbrook State School, a hell-on-earth Senator Robert F. Kennedy called a "snake pit." The Willowbrook Consent Decree was designed to protect the constitutional rights of these patients and move them out into the community. Because of the success and the progress made by the in-group homes, mental health became a civil right in the United States and the Civil Rights of Institutionalized Persons Act was enacted. The screenplay for American Snake Pit has won 38 awards at international film festivals since June 2017 including first place in Comedy/Drama at the West New York F.A.M.E. Festival, and was a finalist in the Art of Brooklyn Film Festival and Hollywood Hills Screenplay Competition. His screenplay Rock, Paper, Sister won first place in the short films category at the Poe Film Festival. The short story is about a former heroin addict now an Ivy League music professor who enters a unique form of psychodrama for therapy to deal with a secret he's kept for thirty years. His latest book, Learned Hopefulness, The Power of Positivity To Overcome Depression, was published in 2020, by New Harbinger Publications. It was ranked the number 1 new release on Amazon and Medical News Today named it the best book for positivity in 2021 and in 2022 and 2023 Verywell Mind chose Learned Hopefulness as top 3 best self-help books written by an expert on depression.

== Positive-Interactive Behavioral Therapy ==
Positive-Interactive Behavioral Therapy (IBT) is a widely used form of evidence-based psychotherapy that was specifically developed for people with dual diagnoses, meaning people who are diagnosed with both an intellectual disability (ID) and a psychological disorder. It uses a modification of theory and technique borrowed from other models in group psychotherapy, and its theoretical foundations and many of its techniques are drawn directly from a form of psychotherapy called psychodrama that was created by Jacob L. Moreno. As people with intellectual disabilities tend to have a difficult time verbalizing their feelings, IBT allows patients to act out particular issues they have while role-playing with others.

In psychodrama, there are three stages during sessions (warm-up, enactment, and sharing), but those with ID have cognitive limitations, making it difficult to talk about abstract thoughts and feelings that are necessary for therapeutic change. In IBT, four stages were developed: orientation, warm-up and sharing, encounter, and affirmation. Each of these stages works toward encouraging patients to communicate effectively while in group settings, particularly those with visual and auditory difficulties, bolsters them with affirmations, and improves social skills.

People with ID have a higher rate of psychological disorders and, as a result, were often subject to diagnostic overshadowing. Their mental illness were often overlooked because of their ID or thought that the symptoms were part of the ID itself. But when mental illness was diagnosed, the route of traditional psychotherapy presented a number of obstacles. IBT addresses the unique circumstances of people with ID and mental illness in addition to giving them a sense of belonging and of self-understanding while learning to help others. By working in IBT, the patients with ID can experience an emotional release and learn there is hope as they each work through their issues.

== Books ==
- Niemiec, R. M., & Tomasulo, D. (2023). Character strengths and abilities within disabilities: Advances in science and practice. Springer Nature Switzerland AG. https://doi.org/10.1007/978-3-031-36294-1
- Tomasulo, Daniel (2023). The Positivity Effect New Harbinger Publications. ISBN 9781648481116
- Tomasulo, Daniel (2020). Learned Hopefulness: The Power of Positivity to Overcome Depression. New Harbinger Publications. ISBN 9781684034680
- Tomasulo, Daniel (2018). American Snake Pit. Stillhouse Press. ISBN 9781945233029
- Tomasulo, Daniel (2008). Confessions of a Former Child: A Therapist's Memoir. Graywolf Press. ISBN 978-1555974992.
- Razza, Nancy; Tomasulo, Daniel (2005). Healing Trauma: The Power of Group Treatment for People with Intellectual Disabilities. American Psychological Association. ISBN 978-1591471608.
- Tomasulo, Daniel (1998). Action Methods in Group Psychotherapy: Practical Aspects. Meridian. ISBN 978-1560326595.
