= Takeo Shiota =

Japanese-American landscape architect

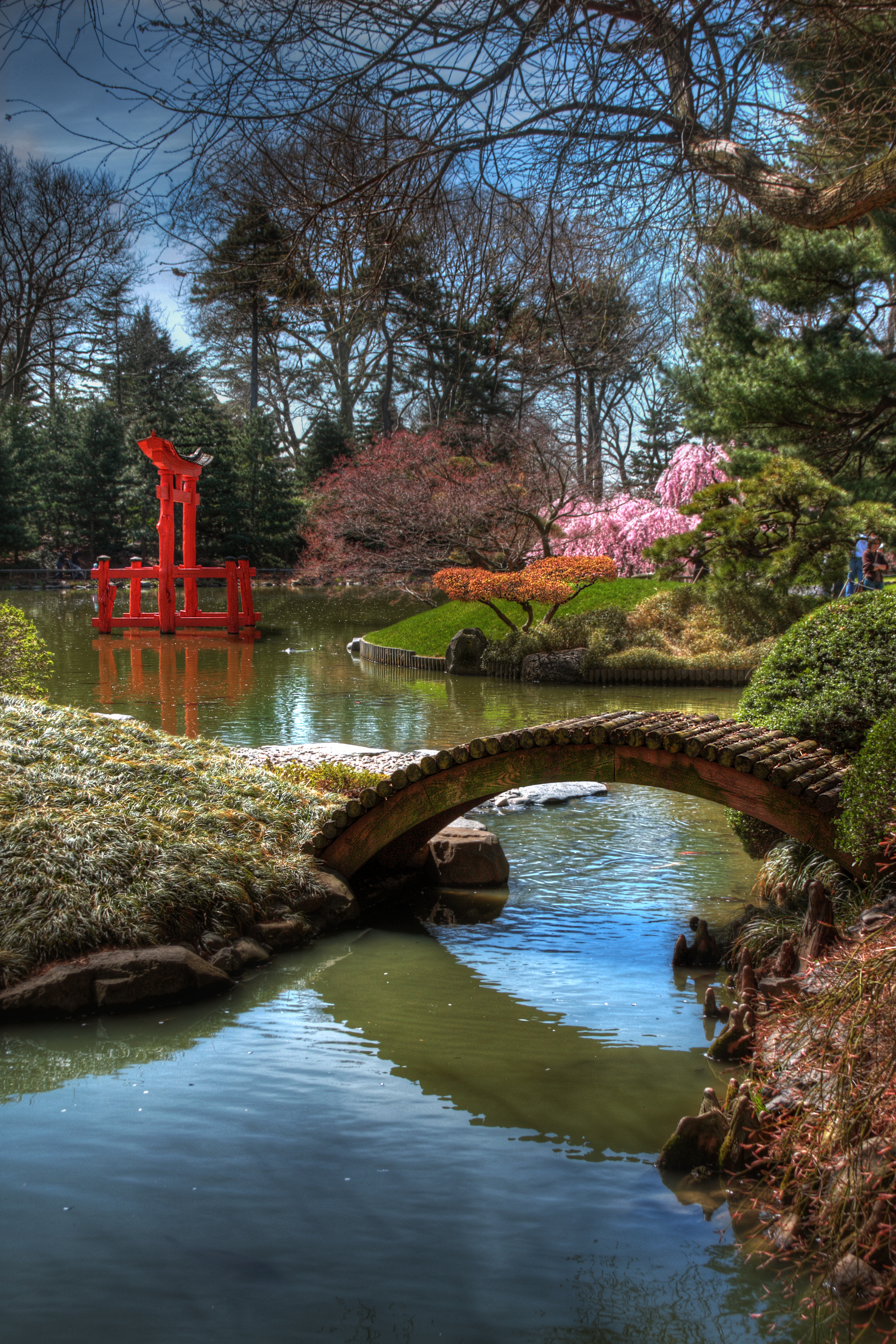
Japanese Hill-and-Pond Garden, Brooklyn Botanic Garden

Takeo Shiota (塩田 武雄, Shiota Takeo; July 13, 1881 – December 3, 1943) was a Japanese-American landscape architect, best known for his design of the Japanese Hill-and-Pond Garden at the Brooklyn Botanic Garden.

== Biography ==
Shiota was born about 40 miles (60 km) outside of Tokyo on July 13, 1881. He came to the United States at the age of 26.

In addition to his landscape work, he was also the author of The miniature Japanese landscape: a short description in 1915. In the 1920s he formed a partnership with Thomas S. Rockrise (born Iwahiko Tsumanuma, 1878 - 1936) and conducted business from 366 Fifth Avenue.

Shiota died in an internment camp in South Carolina in 1943.

== Work ==
The design of the Shiota's Japanese Hill-and-Pond Garden at the Brooklyn Botanic Garden, dates from 1914. It stands as the prototype for a popular genre, the first Japanese garden to be created in an American public garden. Shiota's design blended the ancient hill-and-pond style and the stroll-garden style of the Azuchi–Momoyama period, in which various landscape features are gradually revealed along winding paths. Its 3 acres (1.2 ha) contain hills, a waterfall, a pond, and an island, all artificially constructed, with wooden bridges, stone lanterns, a viewing pavilion, a torii, and a Shinto shrine (razed by an arsonist in 1937 and rebuilt in 1960).

Other work includes:

- one of the four gardens at the Sister Mary Grace Burns Arboretum in Lakewood Township, New Jersey (originally commissioned by George Jay Gould I, and now part of Georgian Court University)
- a Japanese garden at the Walter Kroll house, "Sho-Chiku-Bai", in Tuxedo Park, New York, for architects Walker & Gillette, c. 1912
- the rooftop North Garden at the Astor Hotel
