= Sister Mary Grace Burns Arboretum =

Botanical garden in Lakewood Township, New Jersey, United States

Coordinates: 40.0952°N 74.2277°W

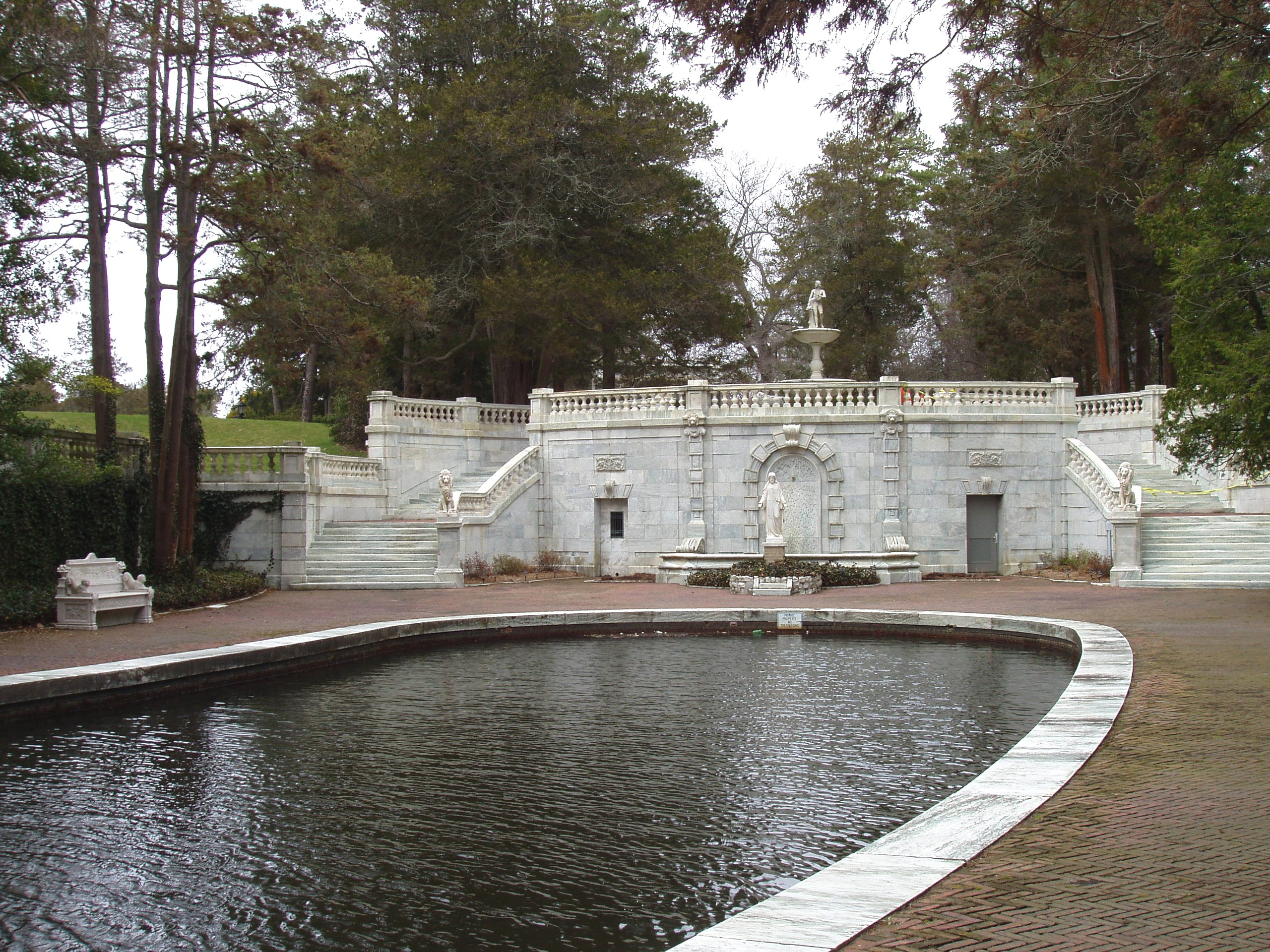
Sunken Garden and Lagoon

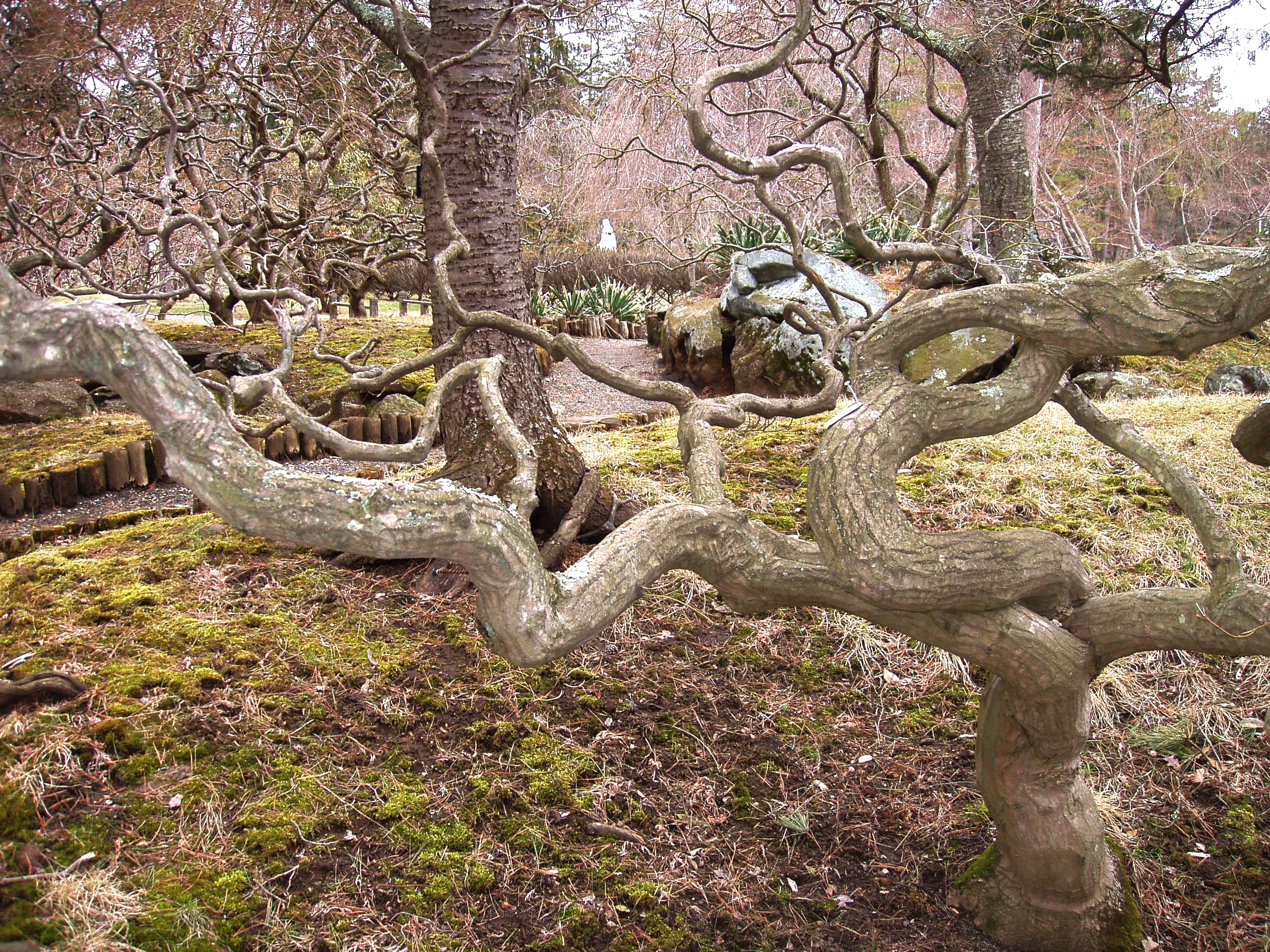
Japanese Garden

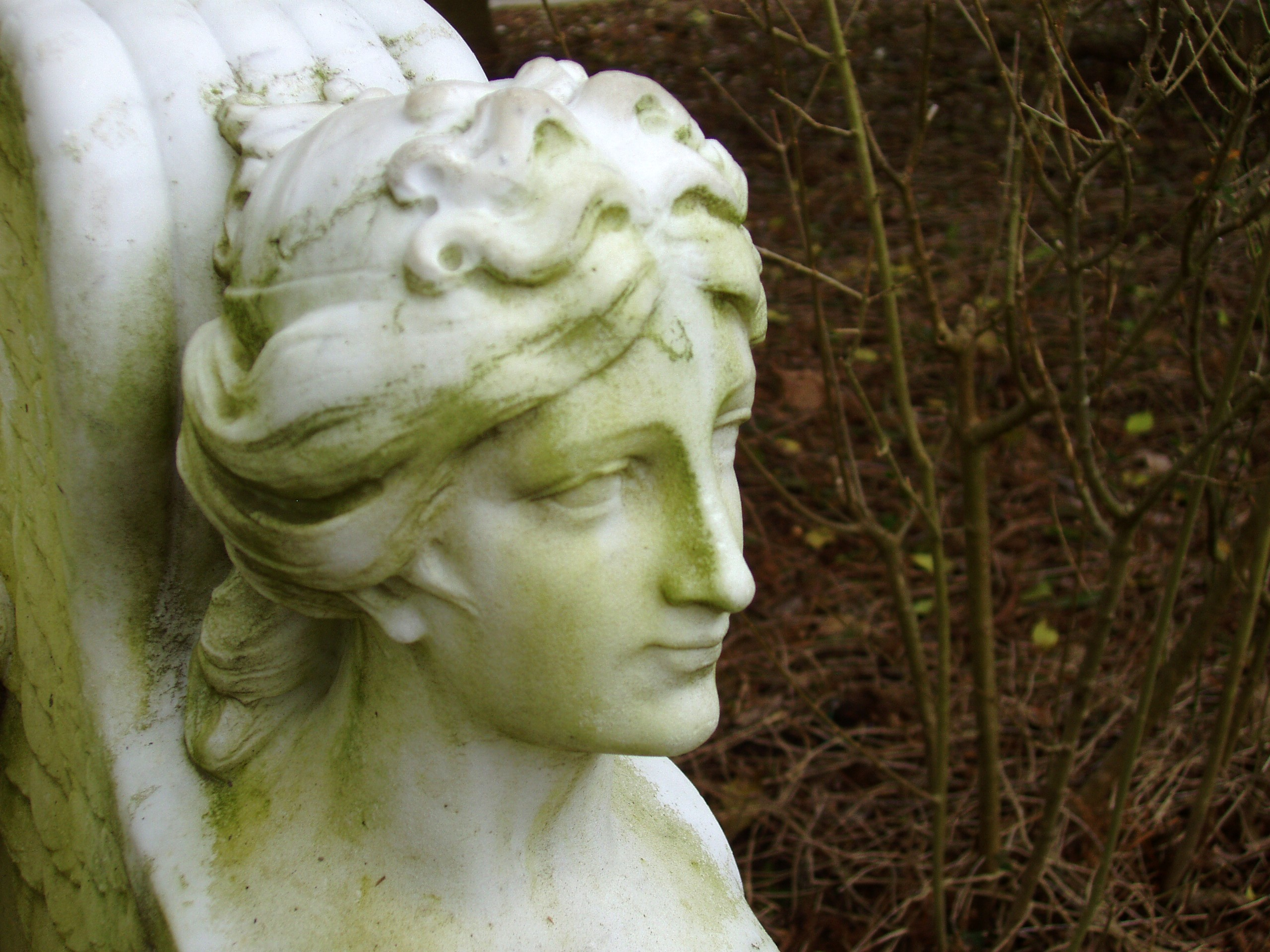
Sculptural detail

The Sister Mary Grace Burns Arboretum, on the campus of Georgian Court University, in Lakewood Township, New Jersey, United States, was once the landscaped park for the winter home of George Jay Gould, millionaire son of railroad tycoon Jay Gould.

== History ==
In 1896, architect Bruce Price was hired to transform the land into the replica of a Georgian country house. Since the sandy soils of the New Jersey Pine Barrens were not suitable for cultivating exotic plants, 5,000 cartloads of fine loam were brought to Georgian Court from neighboring Monmouth County. Bruce Price designed three of the four major gardens: the Italian Garden, the Sunken Garden, and the Formal Garden. Takeo Shiota designed the Japanese Garden.

Today's arboretum, established in 1989, is named after Sister Mary Grace Burns, former professor of biology, and comprises the entire campus of 62 ha (155 acres). In addition to many exotic species, the arboretum features a good collection of native plants of the New Jersey Pine Barrens. Most notable are the very large and old oaks and pitch pines (Pinus rigida).

The Formal Garden is an elliptical flower garden ringed with American holly (Ilex opaca), eastern white pine (Pinus strobus), Norway spruce (Picea abies), Sawara cypress (Chamaecyparis pisifera), Manitoba maple (Acer negundo), copper beech (Fagus sylvatica), common horse-chestnut (Aesculus hippocastanum), and white ash (Fraxinus americana), as well as rose mullein, white daisies, primroses, black-eyed Susans, daylilies, purple veronica, balloon flowers, verbena, asters, chrysanthemums, and an assortment of annuals.

Founders' Grove includes Franklinia (Franklinia alatamaha), dawn redwood (Metasequoia glyptostroboides), Japanese white pine (Pinus parviflora), weeping Norway spruce (Picea abies cv. 'Pendula'), pagoda tree (Styphnolobium japonicum), Serbian spruce (Picea omorika), and sourwood (Oxydendrum arboreum). Trees added in subsequent years include American sycamore (Platanus occidentalis), common hackberry (Celtis occidentalis), common persimmon (Diospyros virginiana), Osage-orange (Maclura pomifera), and green ash (Fraxinus pennsylvanica).

The Italian Garden features a Fountain of Apollo, a wrought iron eagle statue purchased from the Paris Exposition of 1900, life-size statues of Greek gods and goddesses, floral urns mounted on marble pedestals, and two semi-circular pergolas with Tuscan columns, marble benches and statuary. Most trees are conifers, and include blue pine (Pinus wallichiana), eastern white pine (Pinus strobus), pitch pine, shortleaf pine (Pinus echinata), blue spruce (Picea pungens), eastern arborvitae (Thuja occidentalis), Chinese arborvitae (Platycladus orientalis), eastern juniper (Juniperus virginiana), Chinese juniper (Juniperus chinensis), eastern hemlock (Tsuga canadensis), Hinoki cypress (Chamaecyparis obtusa) and Sawara cypress, Mediterranean cypress (Cupressus sempervirens), and stone pine (Pinus pinea).

The Japanese Garden contains a stately koyamaki (Sciadopitys verticillata) on the island in the center of the garden, Japanese yew (Taxus cuspidata), Japanese cherry (Prunus serrulata), Hinoki cypress, Japanese maple (Acer palmatum), and weeping Higan cherry (Prunus subhirtella), as well as irises (Iris spp.), rhododendron (Rhododendron spp.), and laburnum (Laburnum anagyroides).

The Sunken Garden, with lagoon connecting it to Lake Carasaljo, features a 17th-century marble fountain from southern France, a double marble staircase flanked by lions, and carved marble benches which are copies of the benches in the Vatican Garden. The lagoon connects to Lake Carasaljo under a bridge also designed by Bruce Price, restored in 1999. The Sunken Garden features azaleas (Rhododendron spp.), Sawara cypress, myrtle, and eastern redbud (Cercis canadensis).

== See also ==
- List of botanical gardens and arboretums in the United States
