= Woolrich (surname) =

Woolrich is a surname. Notable people with the surname include:

- Abel Woolrich (1947–2006), Mexican actor
- Cornell Woolrich (1903–1968), American writer
- Humphrey Wollrich (also Woolrich and other variants; 1633–1707), English writer
- John Woolrich (born 1954), English classical composer
- John Stephen Woolrich (1820–1850), English engineer and inventor

== See also ==
- Wolryche
- Woolwich (disambiguation)
