= Iwahiko Tsumanuma =

Japanese architect (1878–1936)

- Born: 1878; Yamagata, Japan
- Died: 5 February 1936 (aged 57–58); Saranac Lake, New York, US
- Education: Syracuse University
- Occupation: Architect
- Spouse: Agnes Margaret Asbury (1915–his death)
- Children: George T. Rockrise

Iwahiko Tsumanuma, a.k.a. Thomas S. Rockrise, A.I.A., (1878 – February 5, 1936) was one of the earliest Japanese immigrants to receive an architecture degree at an American university and was among the first Japanese architects to be licensed in the State of New York in 1916. His practice was based in New York City and included work in the United States as well as Asia.

== Early life and education ==
Tsumanuma was born in Yamagata, Yamagata Prefecture, Japan, during the Meiji Era.

Tsumanuma immigrated to New York on September 23, 1904, and traveled to Akron, Ohio. Tsumanuma attended the Buchtel Academy, graduating in 1907, and went on to Buchtel College (later known as the University of Akron) and completed one year of the mechanical engineering program.

Tsumanuma applied to and was accepted into the School of Architecture at Syracuse University in 1908. Syracuse was one of the leading architecture schools of the day and firmly rooted in the École des Beaux Arts pedagogy. To fund his education, Tsumanuma purchased and operated a summer boardwalk shop at Sea Isle City, New Jersey called Nippon Bazaar. Tsumanuma graduated in June 1912 with a bachelor's degree in architecture.

== Career ==
=== Apprenticeship ===
Tsumanuma moved to New York City to undertake his apprenticeship. Between 1912 and 1916 he worked for Trowbridge & Livingston and moonlighted for several other firms. While at Trowbridge & Livingston, he worked on the J.P. Morgan building at the corner of Wall and Broad Streets in New York City. A May 1914 resume also indicates employment with Paul & Limbrand; Brown & Worthman; Denby & Nute and Lord & Burnham. In addition, he worked for architect Francis Burrall Hoffman Jr., particularly on the Italianate estate, Vizcaya, in Miami, Florida. Tsumanuma worked for Murphy & Dana as early as 1915 on the Tsinghua University's gymnasium and library in Beijing. He was also principal designer for a besso (Japanese style country house) for Robert LeMoyne Barrett, in Concord, New Hampshire. An early independent project of Tsumanuma's, obtained through his connections in New York's Nikkei community, was the Keizo Uenaka residence designed in the American Colonial style in Tokyo, Japan.

On December 1, 1916, Tsumanuma became one of the first two Japanese architects licensed in the State of New York (certificate number 663).

=== Independent practice ===
Tsumanuma opened his own office on New Year's Day, 1917. Between approximately 1916 and 1920 he worked in partnership with noted garden designer, Takeo Shiota. Two of their high-profile commissions were the new Fifth Avenue galleries for Yamanaka & Company (a renowned Japanese trading company with branches from Paris to Peking) and the interior design of a luxurious apartment for Elias Burton Holmes. In 1916, in an effort to combat the racial discrimination faced by Japanese draftsmen and architects, Tsumanuma formed the Japanese T-Square Club with about 17 members. Their meetings at the Nippon Club (a private club for Japanese businessmen to meet and entertain associates) introduced members to architects from various leading New York architectural firms. Under Tsumanuma's leadership, the most visible undertaking of the T-Square Club was a competition for the design of a Japanese style home suitable for American suburbs. The competition attracted Japanese architects in both the United States and Japan.

=== Work in Asia ===
By the end of the First World War, Tsumanuma and Shiota had accumulated an impressive portfolio of published projects, all of which incorporated Japanese design elements. None drew on Tsumanuma's Beaux Arts training. With the fashion for the Japonesque fading on the east coast, Tsumanuma made the first of two trips back to Japan in 1920 in search of new commissions abroad. During this trip he visited his family for the first time since leaving Yamagata in 1899. Tsumanuma had two Beaux Arts projects in hand when he arrived in Japan; a museum in Kyoto and a large masonry apartment building, along with prospects for office buildings from patrons in New York City's Nikkei community. However, he returned from this trip with the largest and most complex project of his career, a 600-bed municipal hospital in Kobe, sponsored by Kawasaki Shipyards.

The Tsumanuma and Shiota partnership dissolved during the transition from domestic to international work. A new partner, John A. Thompson, joined Tsumanuma on his second trip to Japan in 1921. Thompson brought skills in modern hospital design to the Kobe project. While working for McKim, Mead & White, Thompson had worked on the master plan for the New Bellevue Hospital in New York City. Under the Rockrise and Thompson partnership, the firm designed an office building for Nanyang Brothers Tobacco Company in Shanghai, as well as projects for Yamanaka and Company and Dr. Takamine in Osaka and Tokyo. All of this work employed the Beaux Arts style.

== Personal life ==
On April 4, 1915, Tsumanuma met Agnes Margaret Asbury through his friends, the Ashiwaras. Asbury was employed in the Ashiwaras' family business. Asbury, born February 18, 1886, in Brooklyn, New York, was the only child of Tennessee (her mother was from Tennessee) and Francis ‘Blakie’ Asbury (born in England). They became engaged on May 5, 1915, and married on December 1, 1915. On November 25, 1916, their only child, George, was born.

== Death ==
In August 1922, Tsumanuma was diagnosed with tuberculosis. Tsumanuma was advised to take the rest cure at Saranac Lake, New York, the most advanced treatment available prior to the discovery of penicillin. As his health declined, Tsumanuma did almost no work. He died on February 5, 1936.

== Projects ==
The depth and breadth of Tsumanuma's work is not known. Twice after his diagnosis with tuberculosis, he burned much of his work and drawings. Documentation of the following projects survives:

- J.P. Morgan Bank, New York City (Trowbridge & Livingston) ~1912
- Robert Barrett Besso, Cornish, NH (Murphey & Dana) ~1913
- Tsinghua University (gymnasium and library), Beijing, China (Murphey & Dana) ~1915
- Vizcaya (Italianate estate), Miami, FL (Francis Burrall Hoffman Jr.) ~1915 Associate Architect
- Keizo Uenaka Residence, Tokyo, Japan ~1916
- Yamanaka & Co. Gallery, NYC, NY (Rockrise & Shiota) ~1918
- Elias Burton Holmes Residence, NYC, NY (Rockrise & Shiota) ~1919
- Residence, Bound Brook, NJ (1918)
- Shoji Mayeda Apartment Hotel, Tokyo, Japan (Rockrise & Thompson) ~1921 — no evidence it was built
- Tokushichi Nomura Museum, Kyoto, Japan (Rockrise & Thompson) ~1920 — no evidence it was built
- Nanyang Brothers Tobacco Company Office Building, Shanghai, China (Rockrise & Shiota, completed by Rockrise & Thompson) ~1920
- Kawasaki Hospital, Kobe, Japan (Rockrise & Thompson) ~1922
- Levy Tea House, Dobbs Ferry, NY ~1922
