= Georgian Court University =

Catholic university in Lakewood Township, New Jersey, U.S.

- Former names: Mount Saint Mary College (1908–1924); Georgian Court College (1924–2004)
- Motto: Belong. Believe. Become.
- Type: Private university
- Established: 1908; 118 years ago
- Religious affiliation: Roman Catholic (Sisters of Mercy)
- Academic affiliations: Sea-grant; Space-grant; Conference for Mercy Higher Education; MSCHE, ACCU, NAICU, CIC
- Endowment: $59.1 million (2025)
- President: Eugene J. Cornacchia (interim)
- Faculty: 78 full-time plus 140 adjuncts (Fall 2024)
- Students: 1,890 (fall 2024)
- Undergraduates: 1,491 (fall 2024)
- Postgraduates: 399 (fall 2024)
- Location: Lakewood Township, New Jersey, United States; 40.098889°N 74.228889°W
- Campus: Suburban
- Colors: Blue and gold
- Nickname: Lions
- Sporting affiliations: NCAA Division II – CACC
- Mascot: Roary the Lion
- Website: georgian.edu
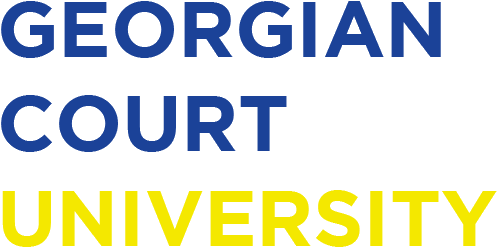

- Georgian Court
- U.S. National Register of Historic Places
- U.S. National Historic Landmark District
- New Jersey Register of Historic Places
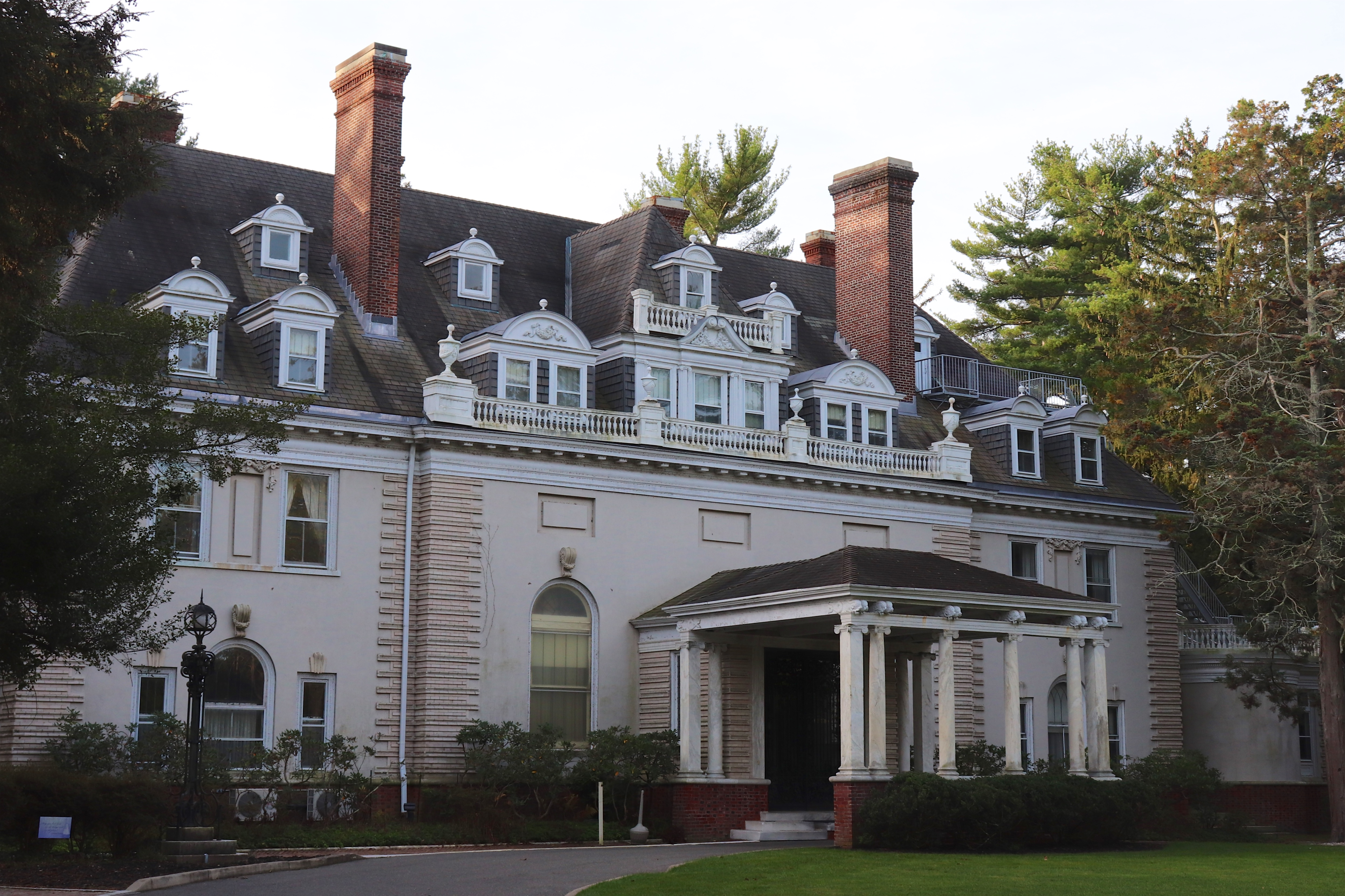
- Mansion, in 2017

- Location within Ocean County, New Jersey Location within New Jersey Location within the United States
- Location: Lakewood Township, New Jersey
- Area: 155.9 acres (63.1 ha)
- Built: 1898
- Architect: Bruce Price, et al.
- Architectural style: Georgian revival
- NRHP reference No.: 78001788
- NJRHP No.: 2306

Significant dates
- Added to NRHP: December 20, 1978
- Designated NHLD: February 4, 1985
- Designated NJRHP: August 2, 1978

Georgian Court University (GCU or Georgian Court) is a private Catholic university in Lakewood Township, New Jersey, United States. Founded in 1908 by the Sisters of Mercy, the university has more than 1,600 undergraduates and nearly 600 graduate students.

The institution became a university in 2004 and began admitting male students in 1994 after more than 100 years as a women's college. The university is open to students of all faiths, while emphasizing its mission of Mercy, which incorporates respect, justice, integrity, compassion, and service.

The Lakewood campus (main campus) was added to the National Register of Historic Places in 1978 and was designated a National Historic Landmark in 1985.

== History ==
=== Location ===
The main campus was built in 1899 on the former summer estate of the millionaire George Jay Gould, son of the railroad tycoon Jay Gould. The Goulds named their home Georgian Court, probably after George or the Georgian-revival architecture.

The estate was designed by Bruce Price, a New York architect, and was one of his most important residential works. He also designed three of the campus's gardens: the Italian Gardens, the Sunken Garden, and the Formal Garden. Takeo Shiota designed the Japanese Garden. In addition to the gardens, GCU has maintained much of the original architecture and the Sister Mary Grace Burns Arboretum. The estate was designated a National Historic Landmark for its architecture and its association with the Goulds.

In March 2022, GCU announced that it had reached an agreement to sell 42 acres of mostly unused land at the edge of its campus and several administrative buildings along Lakewood Avenue to Beth Medrash Govoha for an undisclosed sum. The proceeds of the sale will be used to construct a new center for nursing and health sciences, to reimagine its Casino building (currently used as a multi-purpose office and event space) as a modern student center, to update its Mansion building (currently used for receptions) to be used as an administration hub, and to modernize its student housing/dorm facilities.

=== School ===
The Sisters of Mercy founded Mount Saint Mary College as a liberal arts school for women in 1908, in North Plainfield, New Jersey. In 1924, the sisters purchased the Georgian Court estate and moved the college there, renaming it Georgian Court College.

For more than a century, from 1908 to 2015, the institution was headed by Sisters of Mercy. The Sisters of Mercy organization continues to sponsor Georgian Court through the Conference for Mercy Higher Education.

The full transition to a coeducational institution, admitting both women and men into all academic programs, became complete at the outset of the Fall 2013 semester.

Georgian Court is the only Catholic college or university located in Central or South New Jersey. Most of its enrollment is drawn from these areas.

In 2004, university status was granted by the New Jersey Commission on Higher Education; the name was changed to Georgian Court University.

== Administration and faculty ==
The first eight presidents (1908–2015) of the school were all Sisters of Mercy. The first male academic dean was appointed in 1967.

In 2015, Joseph R. Marbach became the first male and first permanent lay president. On February 6, 2025, Eugene J. Cornacchia became the university's interim president following Marbach's retirement.

== Academics ==
Georgian Court offers more than 35 undergraduate majors and 10 graduate majors through the School of Arts and Sciences, the School of Business and Digital Media, and the School of Education. In July 2021, the university formally created the Hackensack Meridian Health School of Nursing & Wellness at Georgian Court to house its undergraduate and graduate nursing programs. Georgian Court University is nondiscriminatory and welcomes people of all faiths.

Beyond classes offered on the main campus in Lakewood, Georgian Court programs are also offered at GCU at Lincroft, New Jersey (at Brookdale Community College's Northern Monmouth Campus), online and at other locations.

=== Rankings ===
Academic rankings

Regional
- U.S. News & World Report: 95

In 2024, U.S. News & World Report ranked Georgian Court No. 95 out of 171 Regional Universities North.

=== Undergraduate admissions ===
In 2024, Georgian Court accepted 75.8% of undergraduate applicants, with those enrolled having an average 3.59 high school GPA. The university does not require submission of standardized test scores, Georgian Court being a test optional school. Those enrolled that submitted test scores had an average 1150 SAT score (3% submitting scores).

== Athletics ==
The school colors are blue and gold, and the mascot is a lion. The Georgian Court University Lions have 14 sports teams that compete in the NCAA Division II.

The university is a member of the Central Atlantic Collegiate Conference (CACC).

GCU features a 67,000-square-foot (6,200 m^{2}) Wellness Center equipped for athletic training, physical education and sports competitions. In addition, a 1,200-seat arena, athletics fields which offer synthetic turf, a six-court outdoor tennis center, and an abundance of training space offer student-athletes modern facilities and on-campus resources for their sports and recreational activities.

Women's sports include basketball, cross country, lacrosse, soccer, softball, track & field, and volleyball. On August 3, 2022, GCU announced the addition of Acrobatics and Tumbling. The team began competition in 2024.

As of fall of 2013, Georgian Court added men's sports when it became fully coeducational, adding men's basketball, cross country, soccer, and track & field. Men's lacrosse was added in Spring 2016. Baseball was added in Spring 2025.

One of the many historic aspects of the campus is that it houses a "real tennis" court that was built in 1899 in the Casino building (which was a "casino" in the 19th-century sense of the term: a place for social gatherings.) Approximately 45 real tennis courts are still in use in the world today. During a 2018 visit, Prince Edward, Duke of Edinburgh played on the court, which is the only such court at a university and the nation's second oldest.

== Gallery ==
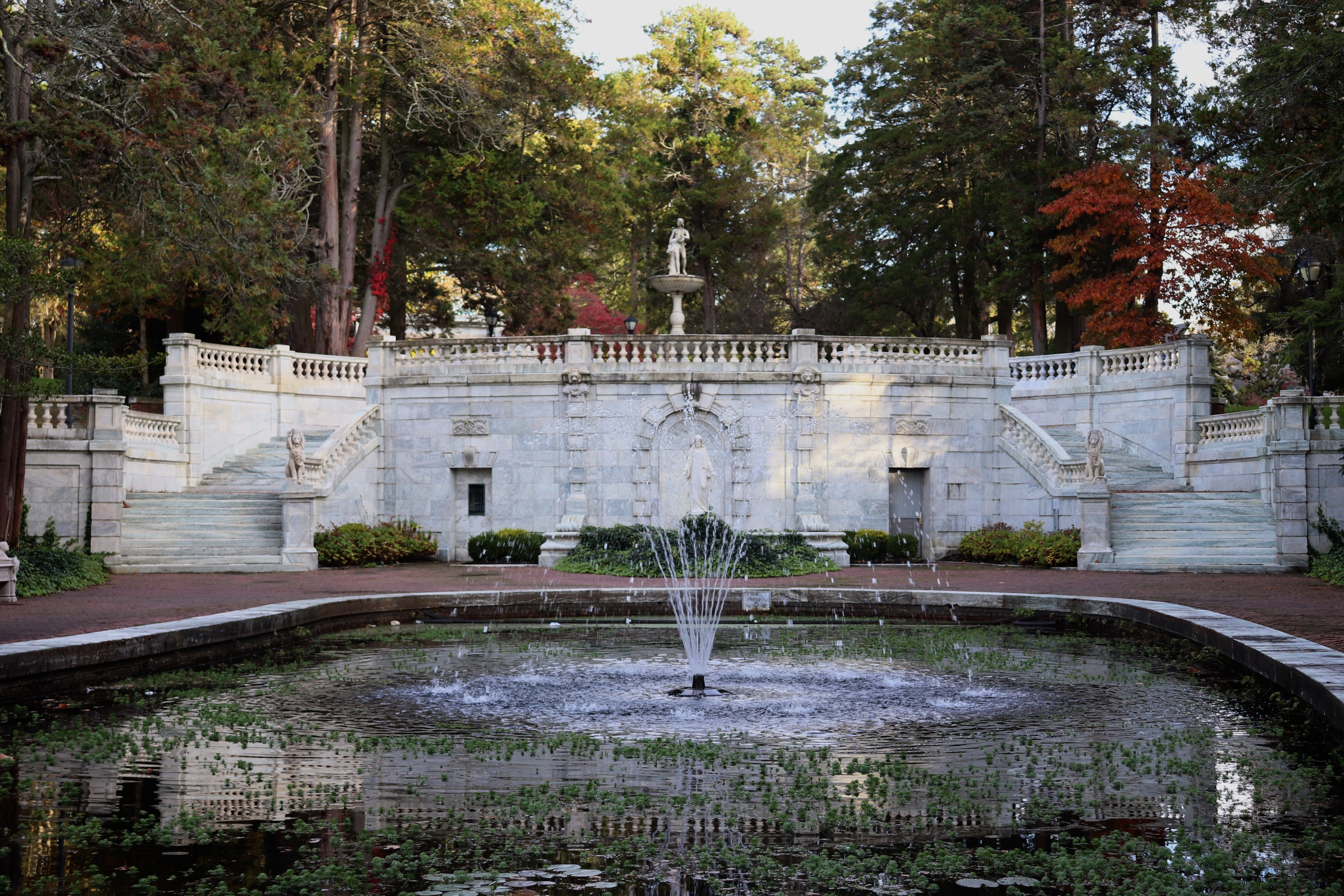
Sunken Garden and marble stairway

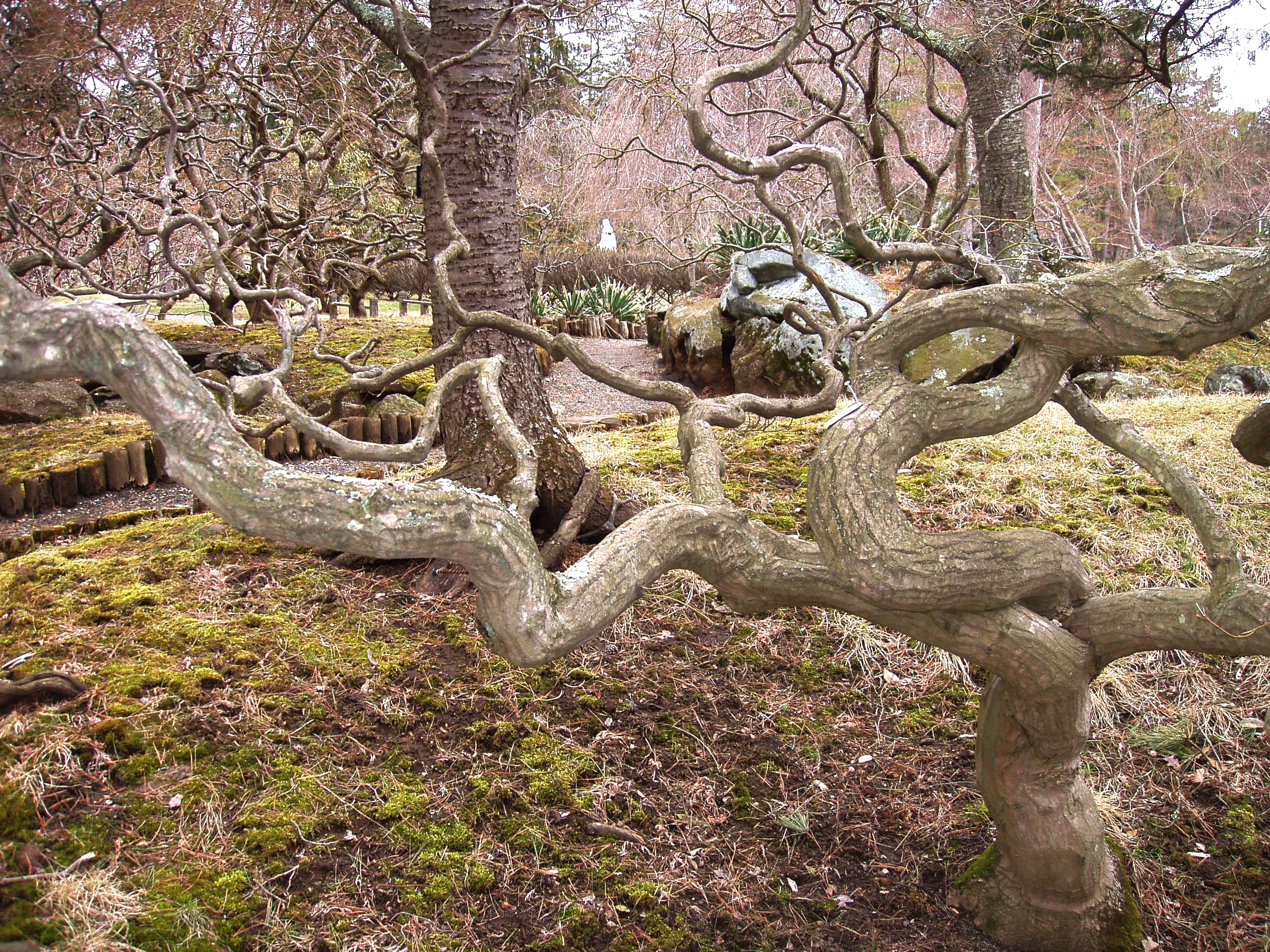
Japanese Garden

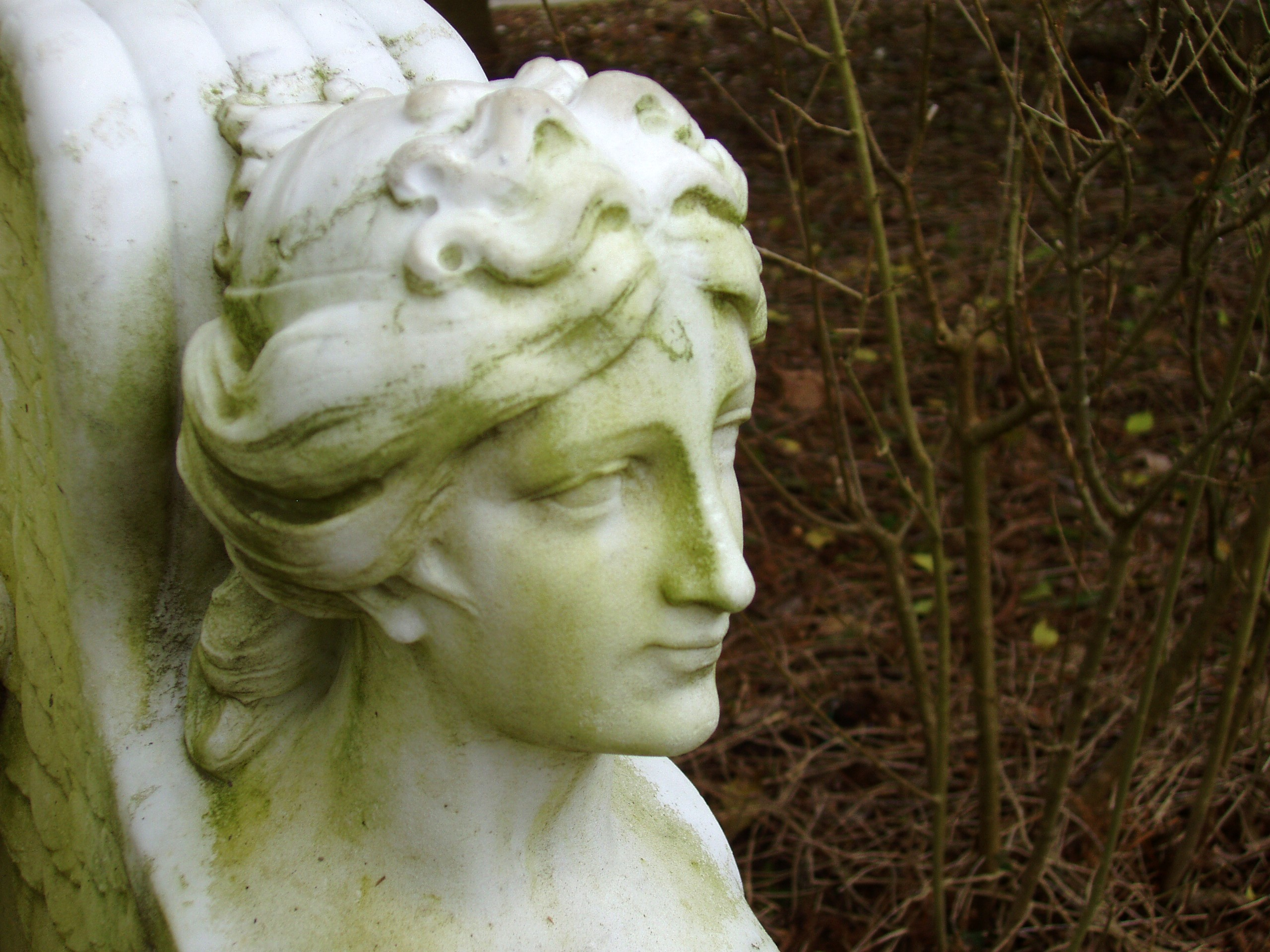
Sculptural detail

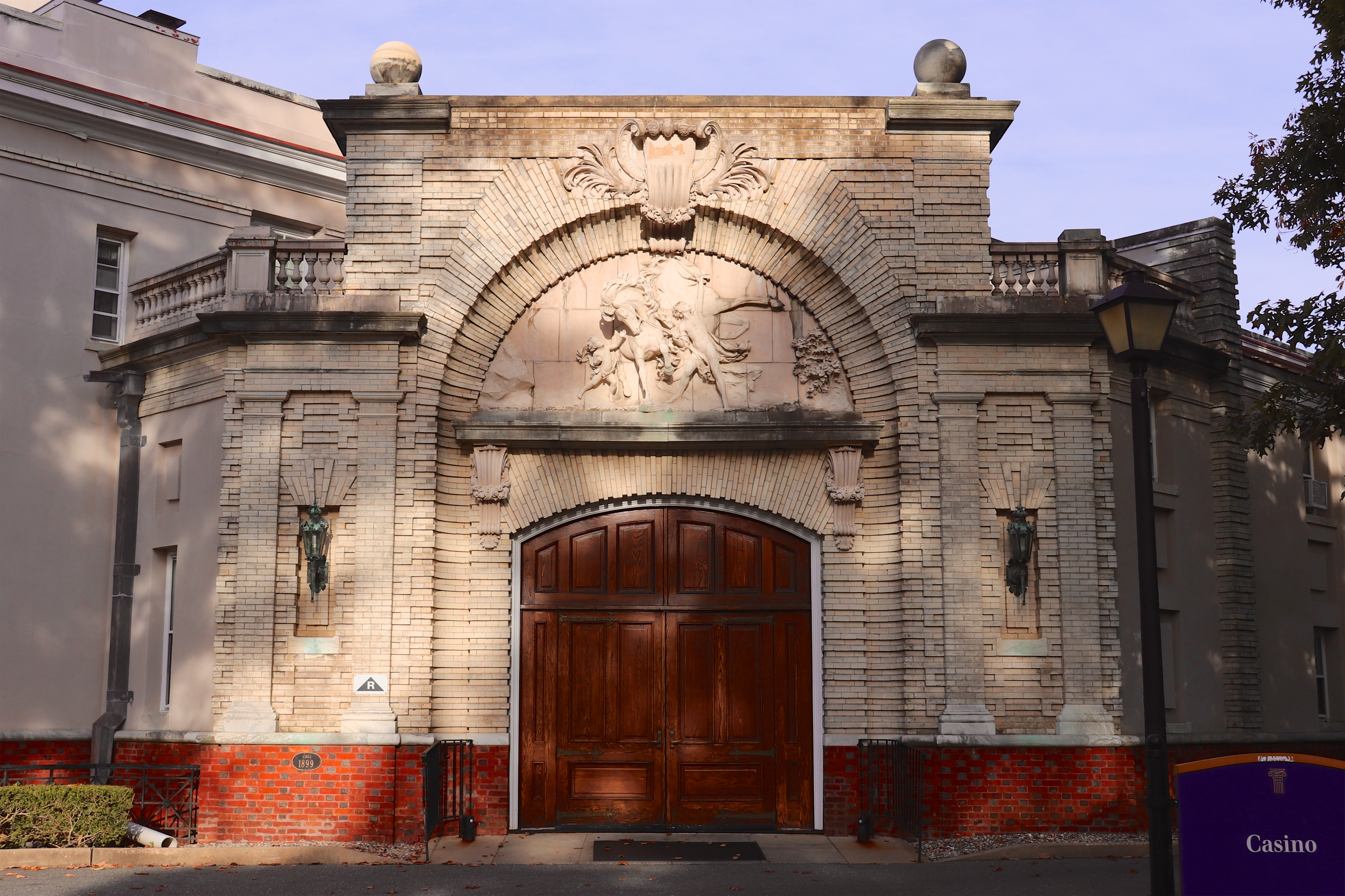
The original Casino

== See also ==
- List of National Historic Landmarks in New Jersey
- National Register of Historic Places listings in Ocean County, New Jersey
