= Madlyn-Ann C. Woolwich =

Madlyn-Ann Crawford Woolwich
- Born: 1937 (age 88–89); Fall River, Massachusetts
- Occupations: Pastel and oil painter

Madlyn-Ann Crawford Woolwich (born 1937) is an American pastel and oil painter in impressionist style of landscapes, floral gardens and still lifes, and an author on the subject.

Born in Fall River, Massachusetts, Woolwich obtained BS and M.Ed. degrees from Bridgewater State College, Massachusetts, with further study at Parson's School of Design, The American Academy of Design, NYC, The University of Massachusetts (Dartmouth Campus) and Brookdale Community College, New Jersey.

She is a Master Pastelist, Pastel Society of America, signature member and former National Vice President of Knickerbocker Artists USA.

As a writer, Woolwich has written feature articles for The Artist's Magazine and Pastel Journal and has been included in books as a featured artist in several publications. Her first book, Pastel Interpretations, was published in 1993, given a three-month museum exhibition of the included artists at the Monmouth Museum, and republished in 1995 in Asnières, France by the Ulisses Publishing Company. Her second book, The Art of Pastel Portraiture, published by Watson-Guptill in July, 1995 has also been published in China.

Woolwich lives and works in Long Branch, New Jersey.
