= Woolwich (disambiguation) =

Woolwich is a district of London, England.

Woolwich may also refer to:

== Places ==
- Woolwich, London, England, and its local features or administrative areas:
  - Woolwich (London County Council constituency), former constituency
  - Woolwich (UK Parliament constituency), former constituency
  - Metropolitan Borough of Woolwich, a former London borough 1899-1965
  - Woolwich railway station
- Woolwich, Ontario, Canada
- Woolwich, Maine, United States of America
- Woolwich, New South Wales, Australia
- Woolwich Township, New Jersey, United States of America
- North Woolwich, London, England
- North Woolwich, Ontario, Canada

== People ==
- Madlyn-Ann C. Woolwich (born 1937), American pastel painter and author
- Bishop of Woolwich, an office in the Anglican church

== Organizations ==
- The Woolwich, a former British bank, previously a building society
- Woolwich Polytechnic (disambiguation)

== Other uses ==
- HMS Woolwich, the name of nine ships of the Royal Navy
- Woolwich Equitable Building Society v IRC [1993] AC 70, a judicial decision of the House of Lords

== See also ==
- Woolrich (disambiguation)
