= Waterloo Institute for Nanotechnology =

Research institute at the University of Waterloo in Ontario, Canada

Coordinates: 43.4715°N 80.5420°W

- Executive director: Sushanta Mitra, PhD
- Affiliation: University of Waterloo
- Location: Waterloo, Ontario

The Waterloo Institute for Nanotechnology (WIN) is located at the University of Waterloo and is co-located with the Institute for Quantum Computing in the Mike and Ophelia Lazaridis Quantum-Nano Centre (QNC). WIN is currently headed by Dr. Sushanta Mitra.

The Waterloo Institute for Nanotechnology comprises 96 faculty from nine different departments in the faculties of Science, Engineering, Mathematics, and Environment.

== Major research facilities ==
The Quantum-Nano centre is the site of a community laboratory for nano-metrology and nano-fabrication. Construction began on 9 June 2008 and is expected to be completed 21 September 2012. The 160 million dollar, 284,000-square-foot (26,400 m^{2}) facility will be the home to a 17,000-square-foot (1,600 m^{2}) laboratory.

=== Funding ===
Capital funding for construction of the QNC was made possible by major gifts and awards from multiple sources including a 101 million dollar donation from Ophelia and Mike Lazaridis (co-CEO of Research in Motion and Chancellor of the University of Waterloo). Government funding includes 17.9 million dollars from the Canada Foundation for Innovation (CFI) which has been matched by the province of Ontario. In addition, an anonymous donor has provided an endowment of 29 million dollars for 3 endowed chairs and 42 Graduate Nanofellowships.

=== Laboratories ===
==== Giga to Nano Electronics Laboratory ====
G2N is a fabrication laboratory that integrates a range of thin-film manufacturing, assembly, testing, and characterization equipment to create electronic systems in the very large (a few billion pixels) and very small (a few nanometres) size range.

==== WATLab ====
WATlab is a nano-materials metrology research facility, equipped with surface and nano-materials research tools for exploring areas of nanotechnology and nano-scale sciences.

==== Advanced Micro-Nano Lab ====
The Advanced Micro-Nano Lab will address the following device technologies.

1. Micro/Nanoelectromechanical Systems (MEMS/NEMS): micro-optics, electromechanical wireless components, and biomedical & microfluidics devices.
2. Carbon Nanotube devices, eventually targeting biomedical applications.
