= Douglas Fregin =

Canadian businessman and electrical engineer

- Education: University of Windsor (BS)
- Known for: Co-founding Research in Motion Design of the BlackBerry device

- images
- RIM co-founder Mike Lazaridis, employee Chris Shaw and co-founder Doug Fregin display the Budgie, the company’s first product, at Fairview Park Mall in Kitchener, Ontario, 1984.

Doug Fregin is a Canadian entrepreneur and engineer. He is best known as the co-founder of Research In Motion (now known as BlackBerry) alongside his childhood friend, Mike Lazaridis.

== Early life and education ==
Fregin had been friends with Mike Lazaridis since grade school. Fregin studied electrical engineering at the University of Windsor. After university, they developed a video signaling device.

== Research In Motion (RIM) and achievements ==
In 1984, Fregin and Lazaridis founded Research In Motion to market their device. In February 1985, they received a $15,000 Ontario New Ventures loan.

Fregin helped design the initial circuit boards used in the company's wireless technology.

Beyond the mobile industry, Fregin was also involved in the creation of other technologies at RIM. The DigiSync film reader, developed by RIM, significantly reduced the time required for post-production tasks in film editing. This technology earned RIM both an Emmy and a technical achievement award from the Academy Awards.

In recognition of his contributions, Fregin, along with Eastman Kodak and the National Film Board of Canada, received a Technology and Engineering Emmy Award in 1994 for the 'Development of a Keycode Reader'.

== Ownership and philanthropy ==
As Research In Motion went public in 1997, Fregin's ownership stake in the company amounted to 5% of shares, valued at $23.6 million. Over the years, the value of his ownership increased, and in 2005, he owned 2.7% of RIM, which had a value of $396 million.

In 2000, Fregin donated $10 million to help found the Perimeter Institute for Theoretical Physics.

Fregin retired from his position as vice president of operations at RIM in May 2007. At that time, he held a 2% ownership stake in the company, valued at $1.3 billion.

Canadian Business estimated Fregin's net worth to be $1.72 billion in November 2007.

Fregin sold all his stock in Research In Motion around the same time Apple released the first iPhone.

In response to strategic changes at BlackBerry, Fregin and Lazaridis established Quantum Valley Investments, a venture fund, in March 2013.

They also considered acquiring BlackBerry and engaged Goldman Sachs Group Inc and Centerview Partners LLC to review their options.

== Personal life and recognition ==
Beyond his entrepreneurial endeavors, Fregin is known for his low-key and low-profile nature. He is a car enthusiast and participates in Toyota's charitable Pro/Celebrity Race.

Fregin was awarded an Honorary Doctorate of Engineering by the University of Waterloo on June 19, 2022, for his achievements.

== In popular culture ==
In the 2023 biographical film BlackBerry Fregin was played by Matt Johnson, who also directed the film.

== See also ==
- List of Canadians by net worth
