= Sushanta Mitra =

Canadian mechanical engineer

- Born: India

Academic background
- Education: BS, 1995, Mechanical Engineering, Jadavpur University; MS, 1997, Mechanical Engineering, University of Victoria; PhD, 2001, Mechanical Engineering, University of Waterloo
- Thesis: Breakup process of plane liquid sheets and prediction of initial droplet size and velocity distributions in sprays. (2001)

Academic work
- Institutions: Waterloo Institute for Nanotechnology; York University; University of Alberta

Sushanta Kumar Mitra is a Canadian mechanical engineer. He is an elected fellow of the American Society of Mechanical Engineers, the Canadian Academy of Engineering, the Engineering Institute of Canada, Royal Society of Chemistry, the American Physical Society, the Electrochemical Society, and American Association for the Advancement of Science.

== Early life and education ==
Mitra was born in India to a physicist father. He earned his undergraduate degree in mechanical engineering at Jadavpur University before traveling to Canada for his graduate degrees. Mitra enrolled at the University of Victoria for his Master's degree and the University of Waterloo for his PhD.

== Career ==
Upon completing his formal education, Mitra joined the Department of Engineering faculty at the University of Alberta. In this role, he led a CMC project to coax microorganisms to convert coal into methane. As a result of his research, he was named a Fellow of the American Society of Mechanical Engineers.

=== York ===
In 2014, Mitra left the University of Alberta to become the Kaneff Professor in Micro and Nanotechnology for Social Innovation and Chair of Mechanical Engineering at the Lassonde School of Engineering. Upon joining the faculty, he was elected a Fellow of the Royal Society of Chemistry and Canadian Academy of Engineering. He was later appointed the Associate Vice-President Research at York University. While serving in these roles, Mitra and his research team conceived of a method of detecting E. coli in contaminated water within two to 60 minutes based on the level of contamination called the Mobile Water Kit. In recognition of his research, he was the recipient of the 2015 Engineering Medal for Engineering Excellence and named a Fellow of the American Association for the Advancement of Science (AAAS). He was appointed as the President of the Canadian Society for Mechanical Engineering.

Mitra continued to advance the Mobile Water Kit and, in 2017, raised $50,000 in seed funding through his co-started startup Glacierclean Technologies Inc. to further develop and test the Mobile Water Kit 2.0. The improvements in the newest kit enabled individuals, municipalities, or industries to test water at the source and receive results within minutes.

=== Waterloo ===
Mitra left York University in 2017 to become the executive director of the Waterloo Institute for Nanotechnology. In this role, he developed DipTest strips to test the contamination of water in less than three hours at a cost of 50 cents. During the COVID-19 pandemic, Mitra helped develop a coating that would kill the COVID-19 virus immediately upon contact with any surface. His research team worked to quantify the adhesion force between the viral load and the coated surface. His research team is also working on rapid detection of COVID-19. He pioneered the liquid-liquid encapsulation technology, that led to the creation of a Dutch Start up, SLE Enterprises B.V. Mitra started his second term as WIN's Executive Director in August 2022.
