= Grindrod (surname) =

Grindrod is a surname of English origin.

== People with the name ==
- Barton Grindrod (1834–1895), Australian cricketer
- David Grindrod, British theatre and television casting director, primarily working with Andrew Lloyd Webber
- Helen Grindrod (1936–2002), British judge
- John Grindrod (bishop) (1919–2009), English-born Australian Anglican bishop
- John Grindrod (author) (born 1970), English author
- Kelly Grindrod, Canadian pharmacist
- Nic Grindrod (born 1975), English racing driver
- Peter Grindrod (born 1959), British mathematician
- Phil Grindrod (fl. 1932–1963), British cinematographer
- Ralph Barnes Grindrod (1811–1883), British physician

== See also ==
- Grindrod (disambiguation)
