= University of Waterloo School of Pharmacy =

School in the University of Waterloo Faculty of Science

Coordinates: 43.45279°N 80.49896°W

School of Pharmacy
- Motto: Innovating Pharmacy Together
- Parent institution: University of Waterloo Faculty of Science
- Director: Andrea Edginton
- Students: 120-130 students per cohort
- Location: Kitchener, Ontario, Canada
- Website: uwaterloo.ca/pharmacy

The University of Waterloo School of Pharmacy is a professional school of the University of Waterloo in Ontario, Canada, within the Faculty of Science. It was previously housed in Faculty of Science buildings on the main university campus in Waterloo, but was re-located to a new $34 million building on the university's Health Sciences Campus in downtown Kitchener in 2008. It is the only pharmacy school in Canada that offers co-operative education.

The school's primary offering is the entry-to-practice Doctor of Pharmacy (PharmD) program. It also offers graduate, research, and professional development programs.

== Architecture ==
It was designed by Siamak Hariri of Hariri Pontarini Architects and Robbie/Young + Wright Architects of Toronto, Ontario in 2008. The building facade features wood, brick, stone, COR-TEN steel while the glass windows feature images, painted by artist Sky Glabush, of common plants used in the historical development of pharmaceuticals.

== Faculty ==
In 2020 School of Pharmacy associate professor Kelly Grindrod was named Canadian Pharmacist of the Year by the Canadian Pharmacists Association in recognition of her work as an advocate, mentor and health care provider.
