= Institute for Quantum Computing =

Research institute at the University of Waterloo in Ontario, Canada

Coordinates: 43.478865°N 80.554853°W

Institute for Quantum Computing (IQC)
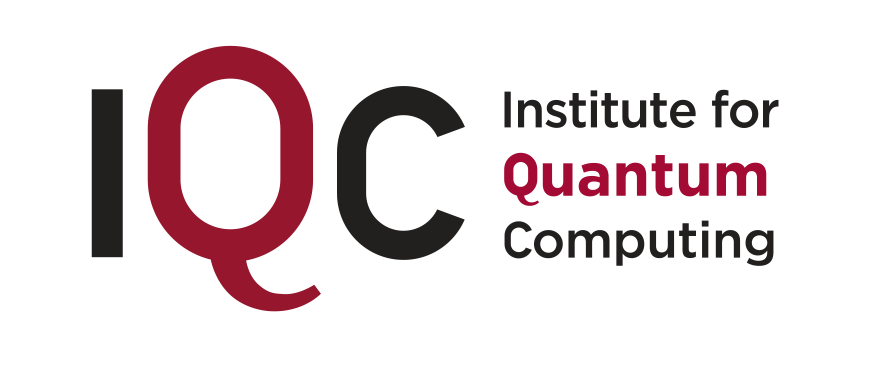
- Type: Research institute
- Director: Norbert Lütkenhaus
- Location: Waterloo, Ontario, Canada
- Affiliation: University of Waterloo
- Website: uwaterloo.ca/iqc

The Institute for Quantum Computing (IQC) is an affiliate scientific research institute of the University of Waterloo located in Waterloo, Ontario with a multidisciplinary approach to the field of quantum information processing. IQC was founded in 2002 primarily through a donation made by Mike Lazaridis and his wife Ophelia whose substantial donations have continued over the years. The institute is now located in the Mike & Ophelia Lazaridis Quantum-Nano Centre and the Research Advancement Centre at the University of Waterloo.

Its executive director is physics professor Norbert Lütkenhaus and hosts researchers based in 7 departments across 3 faculties at the University of Waterloo. In addition to theoretical and experimental research on quantum computing, IQC also hosts academic conferences and workshops, short courses for undergraduate and high school students, and scientific outreach events including open houses and tours for the public.

== History ==
The Institute for Quantum Computing was officially created in 2002, sparked by Research In Motion co-founder Mike Lazaridis and then-president of the University of Waterloo, David Johnston, for research into quantum information. Since inception, Lazaridis has provided more than $100 million in private funding for IQC. The institute is a collaboration between academia, the private sector, and the federal and provincial governments. Raymond Laflamme was the founding executive director.

At its establishment, the institute was composed of only a handful of researchers from the Departments of Computer Science and Physics. Ten years later, there are more than 200 researchers across six departments within the Faculties of Science, Mathematics, and Engineering at the University of Waterloo.

In 2008, IQC moved into the Research Advancement Centre 1 (RAC I) in the University of Waterloo's Research & Technology Park. In 2010, research operations expanded into the adjacent building, Research Advancement Centre 2 (RAC II).

In 2012, IQC expanded into the Mike & Ophelia Lazaridis Quantum-Nano Centre. The 285,000-square-foot facility is shared with the Waterloo Institute for Nanotechnology, and is built to stringent standards (controls for vibration, humidity, temperature, and electromagnetic radiation) for quantum and nanotechnology experiments. The building was designed by Toronto-based firm Kuwabara Payne McKenna Blumberg Architects (KPMB).

== Research ==
Research at IQC focuses on three main applications of quantum information science and technology using the physical sciences, mathematics and engineering from both theoretical and experimental perspectives.

Areas of research currently studied at IQC include:

- quantum computing
- quantum communication
- quantum sensing
- quantum materials
- quantum engineering

In collaboration with the University of Waterloo, IQC offers research positions and advanced courses in the foundations, applications, and implementation of quantum information processing for graduate students. In addition, IQC also offers an interdisciplinary graduate program in Quantum Information which leads to MMath, MSc, MASc, and PhD degrees.

== Facilities ==
IQC currently has offices and laboratories in both Research Advancement Centre I and II, located in the University of Waterloo's David Johnston Research & Technology Park.

On 9 June 2008, Mike and Ophelia Lazaridis, together with Ontario Premier Dalton McGuinty, University of Waterloo President David Johnston, and other guests officially broke ground on the project which will consist of three areas: one to house IQC, one for the Waterloo Institute for Nanotechnology, and a clean fabrication and metrology suite to be shared between the two institutes. It will house offices, laboratory space, and areas for collaboration among researchers. The QNC opened September 21, 2012.

== See also ==
- Quantum computer
- Quantum cryptography
- Quantum information science
- Raymond Laflamme—past executive director, professor at IQC
- Anthony Leggett—winner of 2003 Nobel Prize in Physics and part-time faculty member at IQC
