= University of Waterloo Faculty of Health =

Health sciences school of the University of Waterloo

- Former name: Faculty of Applied Health Sciences
- Type: Public
- Established: 1967
- Parent institution: University of Waterloo
- Dean: Lili Liu
- Location: Waterloo, Ontario, Canada
- Colours: Teal
- Website: uwaterloo.ca/applied-health-sciences

The University of Waterloo Faculty of Health (formerly Faculty of Applied Health Sciences, commonly abbreviated as "AHS"), is one of six faculties at the University of Waterloo in Waterloo, Ontario, Canada. It has 183 staff and faculty members and over 2,700 full-time students. The current dean of the Faculty of Health is Lili Liu. The former Faculty of Applied Health Sciences was officially renamed to the Faculty of Health on January 1, 2021.

== Academics ==
The faculty consists of two academic departments and one school:

- Department of Kinesiology and Health Sciences
- Department of Recreation and Leisure Studies
- School of Public Health Sciences

All programs offer a 5-year co-op degree and a 4-year honours degree. The School of Public Health Sciences offers a Bachelor of Science or a Bachelor of Public Health, Kinesiology offers a Bachelor of Science, and Recreation and Leisure Studies offers a Bachelor of Arts.

=== Kinesiology ===
Kinesiology was founded as the Department of Physical Education. Their original home was the Physical Activities Complex before moving to B.C. Matthews Hall in the mid-1980s. The department moved away from the physical education side and continued to develop over the following decades. Undergraduates have the opportunity to remain in a general program or pursue concentrations in human nutrition, medical physiology, rehabilitation sciences, and ergonomics and injury prevention.

=== School of Public Health Sciences ===
The School of Public Health Sciences was originally established as the Department of Health Studies and Gerontology, in response to the Lalonde report. The department became the School of Public Health and Health Systems in 2011. It became the School of Public Health Sciences in 2021. At the undergraduate level, the school offers Bachelor of Science in health sciences and Bachelor of Public Health degrees. Students have the opportunity to remain in a general program or specialize in gerontology, aging studies, health informatics, pre-clinical, mental health and addictions, and health research. At the graduate level, the school offers a Master of Science in public health sciences, Master of Public Health, Master of Health Informatics, Master of Health Evaluation, Doctor of Philosophy in public health sciences, Doctor of Philosophy in aging, health and well-being, and a Doctor of Philosophy in work and health.

== Research ==
The Faculty of Health is the faculty at the University of Waterloo with the second-highest amount of research funding per faculty member. The faculty hosts the following research centres and groups:

- Canadian Index of Wellbeing (CIW)
- Centre for Community, Clinical and Applied Research Excellence (CCCARE)
- Centre of Research Expertise for the Prevention of Musculoskeletal Disorders (CRE-MSD)
- Geriatric Health Systems (GHS) Research Group
- Global Health Policy and Innovation Research Centre
- interRAI Canada
- Network for Aging Research (NAR)
- Schlegel-UW Research Institute for Aging

== Student life ==
Students in the Faculty of Health are represented by the Association of Health Students Undergraduate Members (AHSUM), which hosts social events, represents student interests to the university, and operates student services including an exam bank.

Additionally, all students pay into the Applied Health Sciences Endowment Fund (AHSEF), which funds student projects and improvements to student workspaces.

== Notable alumni ==
- Heather Moyse: Olympic athlete (Kinesiology, 2000)
