= Grindrod =

Grindrod may refer to:

== Commerce ==
- Grindrod Limited, a South African logistics holding company
- Grindrod Bank (GRDB), a commercial bank in South Africa
- Grindrod Locomotives, a South African railway locomotive manufacturer

== Other ==
- Grindrod (surname), including a list of people with the name
- Grindrod, British Columbia
