= Mike & Ophelia Lazaridis Quantum-Nano Centre =

Research institute at the University of Waterloo in Ontario, Canada

Coordinates: 43.47133°N 80.54392°W

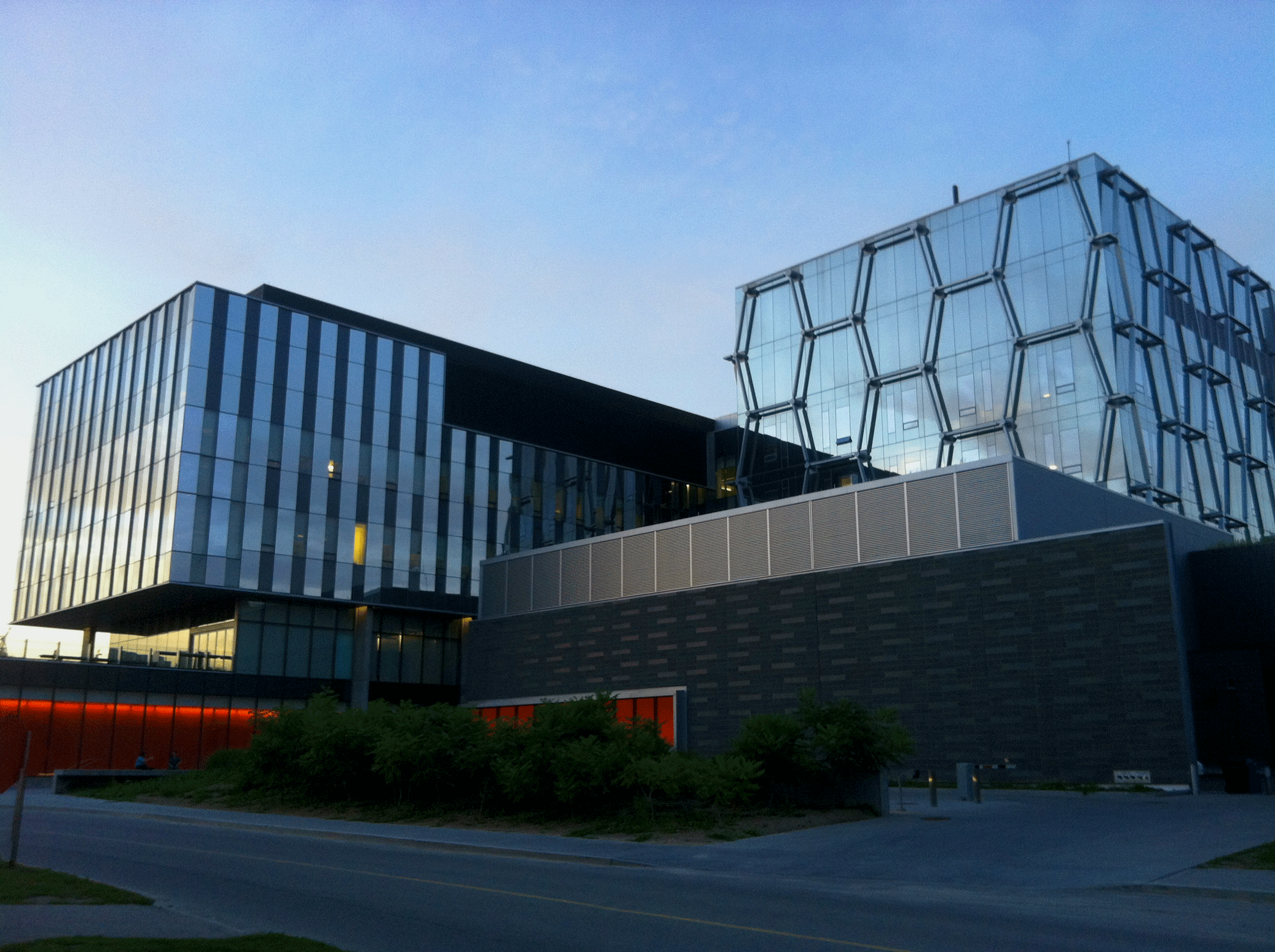
Mike and Ophelia Lazaridis Quantum-Nano Centre at the University of Waterloo

Mike & Ophelia Lazaridis Quantum-Nano Centre (also known as Quantum Nano Centre, or simply QNC) is a research and development laboratory for quantum information science and nanotechnology at the University of Waterloo in Waterloo, Ontario, Canada. The facilities are shared by the Waterloo Institute for Quantum Computing, the Waterloo Institute for Nanotechnology and the Nanotechnology Engineering program at the University of Waterloo.

== History ==
Construction of the QNC began on June 9, 2008; it was officially opened on September 21, 2012. Funding for the $160 million building was made possible by a $100 million donation from Mike Lazaridis (co-founder of Research In Motion, which has since rebranded as BlackBerry), a $25 million grant from the government of Canada as part of Canada's Economic Action Plan, and a mixture of private donations and university funds.

== Building ==
The Quantum Nano Centre is 285,000-square-foot (25,650-square-metre) in size. It includes classrooms for instructional teaching and laboratories for research and development. The facilities operate with control for vibration, humidity, electromagnetic radiation, and temperature. Cleanroom facilities are constructed upon a separate building foundation to keep vibrations at less than a micron.

The QNC is composed of two main buildings designated for the Waterloo Institute for Quantum Computing (IQC) and Waterloo Institute for Nanotechnology (WIN). The building for IQC is designed with outer windows of varying reflectivity to symbolize quantum superposition while the building for WIN features a hexagonal honeycomb lattice structure inspired by the hexagonal carbon structure of nanotubes. These two buildings are joined together by a six-story central atrium. The building also features convertible rooms called "mind spaces" to accommodate collaborative activities including conferences, public lectures, and meetings.

== See also ==
- Institute for Quantum Computing
- Waterloo Institute for Nanotechnology
- Quantum information science
- Nanotechnology
- Mike Lazaridis
