= Mike Lazaridis =

Canadian businessman (born 1961)

Mike Lazaridis OC OOnt FRS
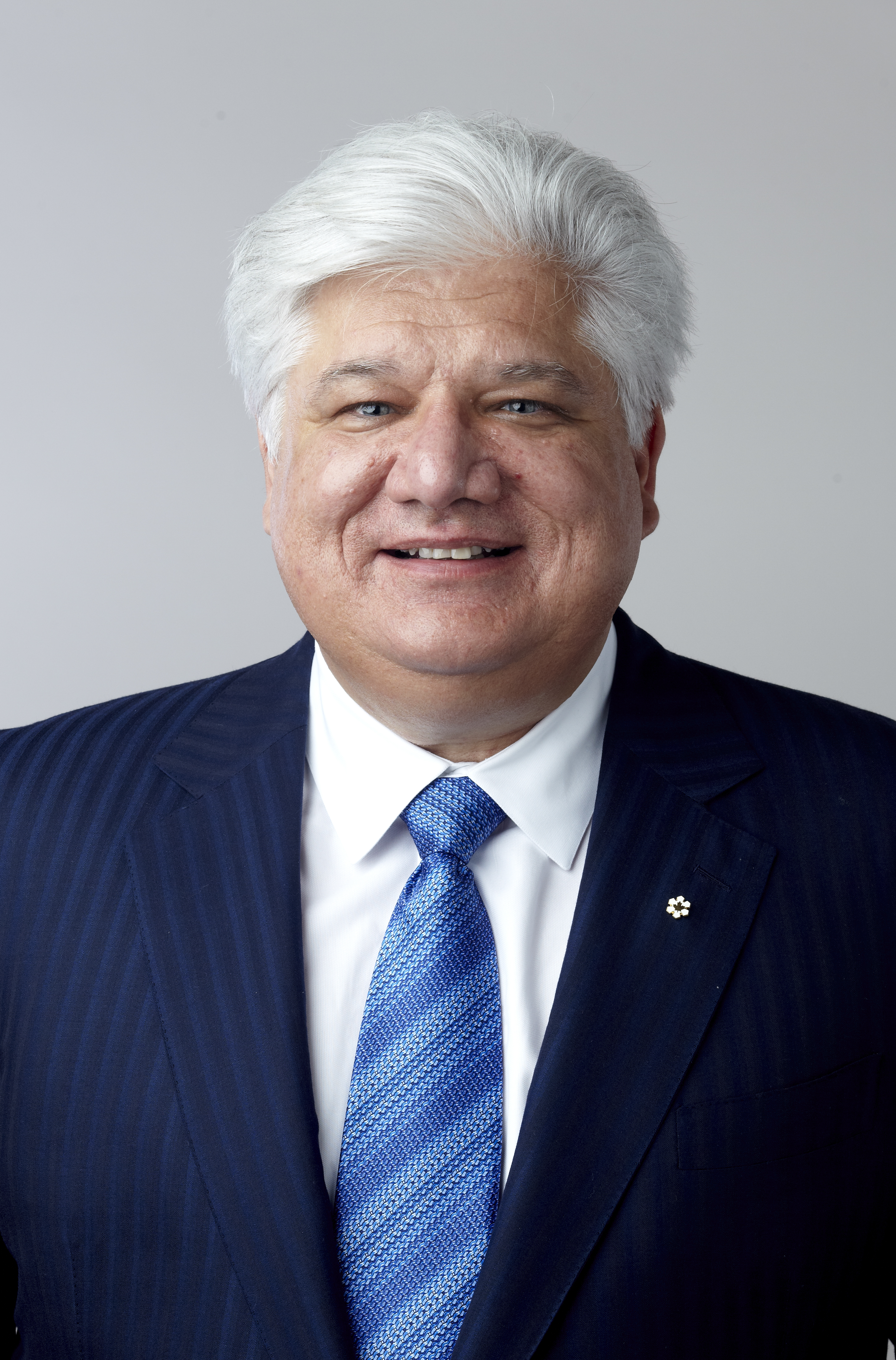
- Lazaridis in 2014
- Born: Mihal Lazaridis; March 14, 1961 (age 65); Istanbul, Turkey
- Education: University of Waterloo (dropped out)
- Occupations: Founder & Managing Partner, Quantum Valley Investments Founder, Research in Motion
- Awards: FRS (2014); OC (2006); O.Ont (2006); IEEE Masaru Ibuka Consumer Electronics Award (2027)

8th Chancellor of the University of Waterloo
- In office 2003–2009
- Preceded by: Val O'Donovan
- Succeeded by: Prem Watsa

Mike Lazaridis, OC, FRS (born March 14, 1961) is a Canadian businessman who co-founded Research In Motion (now BlackBerry Limited), the company that created and manufactured the BlackBerry wireless handheld device. He has gone on to become a major supporter of Canadian academic physics and an investor in quantum computing technologies.

While still a student at the University of Waterloo (UW), Lazaridis responded to a 1984 call for proposals from General Motors, and after winning a GM contract, he left university, and with those and other funds, he, Mike Barnstijn, and Douglas Fregin launched Research in Motion (RIM). RIM first developed an award-winning barcode technology for use in the film industry; using those profits it researched wireless data transmission, leading to introduction of BlackBerry wireless mobile devices (1999–2002). Lazaridis would serve in various positions for RIM and BlackBerry, including co-CEO and co-chair of its board (1984–2012).

After a period of charitable and leadership roles, founding science research organizations (see following), Lazaridis joined Fregin in co-founding Quantum Valley Investments in March 2013, to "provide financial and intellectual capital for the further development and commercialization of breakthroughs in Quantum Information Science".

Among many other charitable contributions of Lazaridis and his wife, Ophelia, Mike Lazaridis and Douglas Fregin also facilitated a private fund of CA$100M in 1999 to establish the Perimeter Institute for Theoretical Physics (he, thereafter, formed its Board and recruited its first Director), and his providing vision and funding to found the UW's Institute for Quantum Computing, including funding the advanced science building that hosts the institute.

Lazaridis has repeatedly been recognized for technical and societal contribution, including via an Emmy and an Oscar for the high-speed barcode reader used in film editing (1994 and 1999, respectively), honorary doctoral degrees from Waterloo and McMaster University (2000 and 2005, respectively), a 2002 Ernest C. Manning Awards Foundation Innovation Award (with RIM's Gary Mousseau), investiture as an Officer of the Order of Canada (OC, 2006), and, in acknowledgment of his roles in founding RIM, the Perimeter, and the IQC, his 2014 election as a Fellow of the Royal Society (FRS).

== Early life and education ==
Mike Lazaridis was born on March 14, 1961, in Istanbul, Turkey, to Pontic Greek parents, Nick and Dorothy Lazaridis. The family lineage derives from the Greek island of Chios. In 1966, when he was five years old, his family moved to Canada, settling in Windsor, Ontario. At age 12, he won a prize at the Windsor Public Library for reading every science book in the library.

In 1979, Lazaridis enrolled at the University of Waterloo to study electrical engineering and computer science. In 1984, after successfully garnering funding for a commercial idea, he dropped out of university.

== Career ==
In 1984, Lazaridis, while still a student, responded to a general call for proposals from General Motors (GM) to develop a "network computer control display system". GM awarded him a contract in response to his proposal. He dropped out of university, and with the GM contract, plus a small government grant and a loan from Lazaridis's parents, Mike Barnstijn, Douglas Fregin and he launched Research in Motion (RIM), the company whose assets are now managed as BlackBerry Limited.

One of RIM's first achievements was the development of barcode technology for film. It reinvested the profits from that product into wireless data transmission research, eventually leading to the introduction of the BlackBerry wireless mobile device in 1999, and its better-known version in 2002. Lazaridis would serve in various positions for RIM and BlackBerry, including as co-chairman and co-CEO of BlackBerry from 1984 to 2012, and Board Vice Chair and Chair of the Innovation Committee from 2012 to 2013.

In 1999, Lazaridis parted with a third of his fortune (at the time), to provide CA$100M to establish an academic research enterprise focused on theoretical physics, thereafter named the Perimeter Institute for Theoretical Physics, for which he formed a Board, and recruited Howard Burton as its first Director. He would also serve as Perimeter's board chair. In 2002, he provided the vision and funds that led to founding of the Institute for Quantum Computing at the University of Waterloo (UW), under UW faculty member, Raymond Laflamme. He has also served as a chancellor of the University of Waterloo. In June 2003, he was named UW's eighth chancellor.

Lazaridis co-founded Quantum Valley Investments in March 2013 with RIM co-founder Douglas Fregin, to "provide financial and intellectual capital for the further development and commercialization of breakthroughs in Quantum Information Science".

== Philanthropy ==
In 1999, Lazaridis is reported to have donated a third of his fortune (at the time) to provide CA$100M to establish an academic research enterprise focused on theoretical physics, thereafter named the Perimeter Institute for Theoretical Physics (a founding sum that would grow over the years). Lazaridis and his wife Ophelia provided the vision and funding—a further $100M over its lifetime—to found the Institute for Quantum Computing at the University of Waterloo, under its 2002 founding executive director, Raymond Laflamme.

In 2015, Lazaridis donated $20M to Wilfrid Laurier University, for a new technology-focused management institute at the business school, which was renamed in his honour as the Lazaridis School of Business & Economics.

Lazaridis and his wife Ophelia have also been noted for their philanthropic work in the Waterloo area; in 2018, they donated ten million dollars to the Stratford Festival for the reconstruction of the Tom Patterson Theatre.

== Awards and honours ==
Lazaridis received an Emmy Award in 1994 for the technical advance of his development of a high-speed barcode reader used in film editing. The same invention was honoured by an Academy Award in 1999, for technical achievement.

In 2000, Lazaridis received an honorary doctor of engineering degree from the University of Waterloo (UW), and in 2005, a further honorary doctoral degree from McMaster University. In UW's 50th anniversary year in 2007, Lazaridis was among the fifty alumni recognized by the UW 50th Anniversary Alumni Awards.

Lazaridis was listed on Maclean's Honour Roll as a distinguished Canadian in 2000, and named Canada's Nation Builder of the Year for 2002 (by readers of The Globe and Mail newspaper). In 2005 he was awarded the title of, and in 2006 invested as an Officer of the Order of Canada, and a member of the Order of Ontario.

In 2014 he was elected a Fellow of the Royal Society. His nomination reads:

Father of what has become known as the smartphone, Mike Lazaridis is recognized in the global wireless community as a visionary, innovator and engineer of extraordinary talent... [The] founder of RIM and the creator of the BlackBerry... [he] made the primary donations establishing the Perimeter Institute for Theoretical Physics, the [University of Waterloo] Institute for Quantum Computing (IQC) and... Lazaridis Quantum-Nano Centre... [Perimeter] has already become an international beacon for theoretical physics and IQC is widely regarded as the leading centre of quantum information science worldwide. Together, these institutes have... made a major impact internationally.

Lazaridis received the 2027 IEEE Masaru Ibuka Consumer Electronics Award, "for transformative contributions to mobile communication through visionary leadership that reshaped global consumer technology".

== In popular culture ==
Lazaridis is portrayed by Jay Baruchel in the 2023 film BlackBerry.

== See also ==
- List of Canadians by net worth
- List of University of Waterloo people

Business positions
Preceded by Company Founded 1984	BlackBerry Co-CEO (with Jim Balsillie); 1984-2012	Succeeded by Thorsten Heins
Academic offices
Preceded by Val O'Donovan	Chancellor of the University of Waterloo; 2003–2009	Succeeded by Prem Watsa
