= Kelly Grindrod =

Canadian pharmacist

- Education: University of Alberta; University of British Columbia
- Awards: Canadian Pharmacist of the Year (2020)
- Scientific career
- Workplaces: University of Waterloo
- Website: uwaterloo.ca/pharmacy/people-profiles/kelly-grindrod

Kelly Grindrod is a Canadian pharmacist and associate professor at the University of Waterloo School of Pharmacy where she studies the impact of digital technology on the management of medications.

== Education ==
Grindrod graduated with a BSCPharm from the University of Alberta and went on to complete a residency at the London Health Sciences Centre. She later received a PharmD (2007) and an MSc (2009) from the University of British Columbia.

== Career ==
Grindrod joined the University of Waterloo School of Pharmacy in 2011. In addition to teaching and research, she works one day a week at the Kitchener Downtown Community Health Centre as a primary care pharmacist.

=== Covid-19 pandemic ===
Grindrod has been a frequent media commentator during the COVID-19 pandemic, providing advice on issues such as third doses and the vaccination of children, and the prevalence of vaccine misinformation. She has also appeared on the CBC Radio program White Coat, Black Art regarding the role of pharmacists in the Canadian health-care system during the pandemic.

== Recognition ==
In 2020 Grindrod was named Canadian Pharmacist of the Year by the Canadian Pharmacists Association in recognition of her work as an advocate, mentor and health care provider.
