= University of Waterloo =

Public university in Ontario, Canada

- Official seal
- Former name: Waterloo College Associate Faculties (1956–1959)
- Motto: Concordia cum veritate (Latin)
- Motto in English: "In harmony with truth"
- Type: Public research university
- Established: 1959; 67 years ago (Note: The university was established under The University of Waterloo Act, 1959, which reorganized Waterloo College Associate Faculties into an independent university. Waterloo College Associate Faculties was a semi-autonomous unit of Waterloo College that operated from 4 April 1956 to its reorganization in 1959.)
- Academic affiliations: ACU; COU; U15; Universities Canada
- Endowment: CA$565.5 million (2025)
- Chancellor: Jagdeep Singh Bachher
- President: Bill Rosehart
- Provost: James Rush
- Faculty: 1,355
- Administrative staff: 2,691
- Undergraduates: 34,204
- Postgraduates: 6,309
- Location: Waterloo, Ontario, Canada; 43°28′37″N 80°33′17″W
- Campus: Urban, 450 hectares (1,112 acres)
- Other campuses: Cambridge; Kitchener; Stratford
Colours
Yellow, black and white
- Nickname: Warriors
- Sporting affiliations: U Sports – OUA
- Mascot: King Warrior
- Website: uwaterloo.ca

The University of Waterloo (UWaterloo, UW, or Waterloo) is a public research university located in Waterloo, Ontario, Canada. The main campus is on 404 hectares (998 acres) of land adjacent to uptown Waterloo and Waterloo Park. The university also operates three satellite campuses and four affiliated university colleges. The university offers academic programs administered by six faculties and thirteen faculty-based schools. Waterloo operates the largest post-secondary co-operative education program in the world, with over 20,000 undergraduate students enrolled in the university's co-op program. Waterloo is a member of the U15, a group of research-intensive universities in Canada.

The institution originates from the Waterloo College Associate Faculties, established on 4 April 1956; a semi-autonomous entity of Waterloo College, which was an affiliate of the University of Western Ontario. This entity formally separated from Waterloo College and was incorporated as a university with the passage of the University of Waterloo Act by the Legislative Assembly of Ontario in 1959. It was established to fill the need to train engineers and technicians for Canada's growing postwar economy. It grew substantially over the next decade, adding a faculty of arts in 1960, and the College of Optometry of Ontario (now the School of Optometry and Vision Science), which moved from Toronto in 1967.

The university is a co-educational institution, with approximately 36,000 undergraduate and 6,200 postgraduate students enrolled in 2020. Alumni of the university include a number of award winners, government officials, and business leaders. Waterloo's varsity teams, known as the Waterloo Warriors, compete in the Ontario University Athletics conference of the U Sports.

== History ==
=== Twentieth century ===
The University of Waterloo traces its origins to Waterloo College (present-day Wilfrid Laurier University), the academic outgrowth of Waterloo Lutheran Seminary, which was affiliated with the University of Western Ontario since 1925. When Gerald Hagey assumed the presidency of Waterloo College in 1953, he made it his priority to procure the funds necessary to expand the institution. While the main source of income for higher education in Ontario at the time was the provincial government, the Ontario government made it clear it would not contribute to denominational colleges and universities.

Hagey soon became aware of the steps undertaken by McMaster University to make itself eligible for some provincial funding by establishing Hamilton College as a separate, non-denominational college affiliated with the university. Following that method, Waterloo College established the Waterloo College Associate Faculties on 4 April 1956, as a non-denominational board affiliated with the college. The academic structure of the Associated Faculties was originally focused on co-operative education in the applied sciences—largely built around the proposals of Ira Needles. Needles proposed a different approach towards education, including both studies in the classroom and training in industry that would eventually become the basis of the university's co-operative education program. While the plan was initially opposed by the Engineering Institute of Canada and other Canadian universities, notably the University of Western Ontario, the Associated Faculties admitted its first students in July 1957.

On 25 January 1958, the Associated Faculties announced the purchase of over 74 hectares (180 acres) of land west of Waterloo College. By the end of the same year, the Associated Faculties opened its first building on the site, the Chemical Engineering Building.

"The greatest product which we will realize from our electronic era is the better educated race. This applies to all fields – not just the field of science."

— Ira Needles, 1956

In 1959, the Legislative Assembly of Ontario passed an act that formally split the Associated Faculties from Waterloo College, and re-established it as the University of Waterloo. The governance was modelled on the University of Toronto Act of 1906, which established a bicameral system of university government consisting of a senate, responsible for academic policy, and a board of governors exercising exclusive control over financial policy and having formal authority in all other matters. The president, appointed by the board, was to act as the institution's chief executive officer and act as a liaison between the two groups.

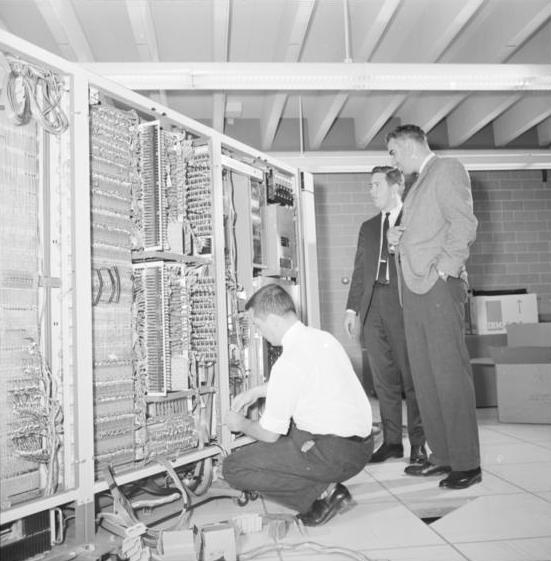
Wes Graham (right) with an IBM computer, Waterloo was one of the first universities in North America to establish a department of computer science.

The legislative act was the result of a great deal of negotiation between Waterloo College, Waterloo College Associated Faculties, and St. Jerome's College, another denominational college in the City of Waterloo. While the agreements sought to safeguard the two denominational colleges, they also aimed at federating them with the newly established University of Waterloo. Due to disagreements with Waterloo College, the college was not formally federated with the new university. The dispute centred on a controversially worded section of the University of Waterloo Act, 1959, in which the college interpreted certain sections as a guarantee it would become the Faculty of Art for the new university. This was something the Associated Faculties were not prepared to accept. As a result of the controversy, Waterloo College's entire Department of Mathematics broke from the college to join the newly established University of Waterloo, later joined by professors from the Economic, German, Modern Languages, and Russian departments. Despite this controversy, until 1960 Hagey hoped for a last-minute compromise between Waterloo College and the university. Ultimately, however, the university created its own Faculty of Arts in 1960. It later established the first Faculty of Mathematics in North America on 1 January 1967. In 1967, the world's first department of kinesiology was created. The present legislative act which defines how the university should be governed, the University of Waterloo Act, 1972 was passed on 10 May 1972.

A coat of arms has been in use by the university since 1961. The coat of arms was officially registered with the Lord Lyon King of Arms in 1987 and with the Canadian Heraldic Authority in 2001.

In February 1995, the former president of the university, James Downey, signed the Tri-University Group (TUG) agreement between Wilfrid Laurier University, and the University of Guelph. Signed in a period of fiscal constraint, and when ageing library systems required replacing, the TUG agreement sought to integrate the library collections and services of the three universities.

=== Twenty-first century ===
In 2001, the university announced it would develop the Waterloo Research and Technology Park in the north campus. The park was planned to house many of the high-tech industries in the area, and is supported by the university, the Regional Municipality of Waterloo, the provincial and federal governments, and Canada's Technology Triangle. The aim was to provide businesses with access to the university's faculty, co-operative education students, and alumni, as well as the university's infrastructure and resources. Groundbreaking was on 25 June 2002, with the first completed building, the Sybase campus building, opening on 26 November 2004. In 2010, the Waterloo Research and Tech Park was renamed as the David Johnston Research and Technology Park, after David Johnston, the 28th Governor General of Canada and former president of the university.

From 2009 to 2012, the university managed four undergraduate programs in Dubai. The university worked in partnership with the Higher Colleges of Technology, the largest post-secondary institution in the United Arab Emirates. Discussions regarding the partnership emerged in 2004, and the Dubai campus was officially opened in September 2009. Through the partnership, the university offered undergraduate degrees in chemical engineering, civil engineering, financial analysis and risk management, and information technology management. The programs offered in Dubai took place in facilities provided by the Higher Colleges of Technology. On 30 October 2012, the university's Board of Governors decided to close the university's extension in Dubai.

On 29 June 2023, one professor and two students of UW were stabbed during a gender studies class. The perpetrator, a UW graduate, was charged with three counts of aggravated assault; four counts of assault with a weapon; two counts of possessing a weapon for a dangerous purpose; and mischief under $5,000. Investigators of the Waterloo Regional Police service believe it was a hate-motivated incident related to gender expression and gender identity. The perpetrator pleaded guilty to four counts on 3 June 2024: two counts of aggravated assault and one each of assault causing bodily harm and assault with a weapon.

== Campus ==
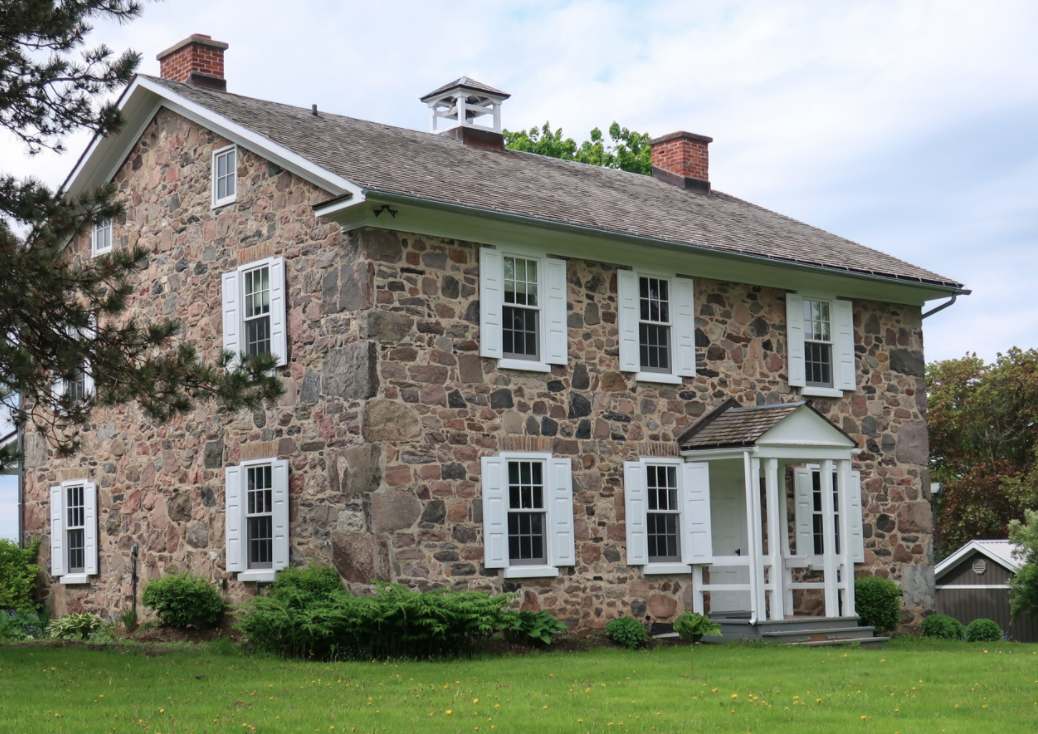
Completed in 1850, the Brubacher House is one of the oldest buildings on campus. The farmhouse was acquired by the university in 1965.

The university's main campus lies within the city of Waterloo, Ontario. It sits on the traditional territory of the Neutral, Anishnaabeg, and Haudenosaunee peoples that is part of the Haldimand Tract, land promised to the Six Nations that includes six miles on each side of the Grand River. It is bordered by Waterloo Park to the south, Wilfrid Laurier University to the southeast, residential neighbourhoods to the northeast, east and west, and the Laurel Creek Conservation Area to the northwest. Three numbered roads also intersect the main campus: University Avenue West, Columbia Street West, and Westmount Road North. While the main campus is 404 hectares (998 acres), the majority of the teaching facilities are centred on a ring road in its southern portion.

The oldest building on campus is the Graduate House, originally a farmhouse dating back to the 19th century. The oldest building which was erected for the university is the Douglas Wright Engineering Building, which was erected in 1958. A large majority of the university's buildings, and its ring road, were constructed during the 1960s. The university's main campus is divided into three major areas: South Campus, North Campus and Northwest Campus. South Campus is the academic core of the university, while North Campus holds the Research and Technology Park. Northwest Campus is the least developed area of the main campus, made up primarily of farm fields and an environmental reserve, which divides it from North Campus.

In addition, the university owns several other properties in Cambridge, Huntsville, Kitchener, and Stratford, Ontario. Grand River Transit, including the ION rapid transit system, provides a transit connection between the main campus, and several off-campus facilities, including the university's start-up incubator program in Kitchener.

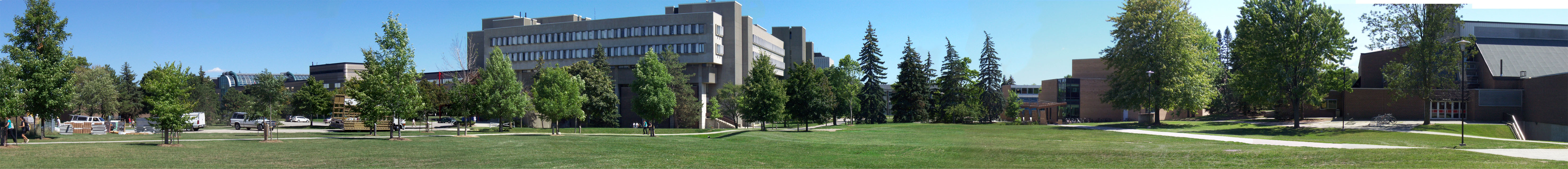
Panoramic view of the main campus from the field south of BC Matthews Hall

=== Libraries and museums ===
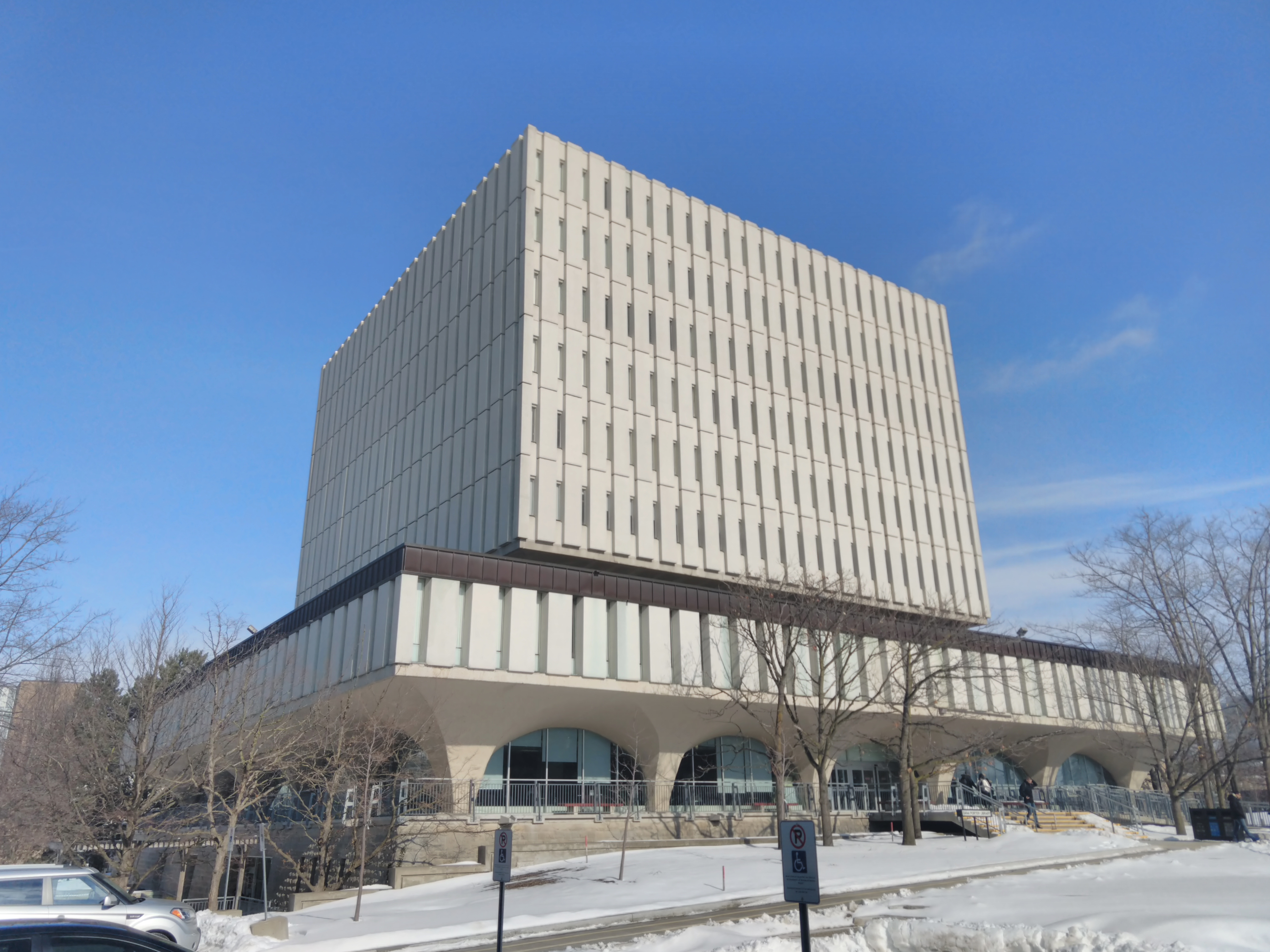
The Dana Porter Library, home to a collection of books focused on the Arts, Humanities and Social Sciences.

The university has four libraries, housing a total of more than 1.4 million books, as well as electronic resources including e-books, serial titles, and databases. Three libraries are on campus: the Dana Porter Library, housing material relating to arts, humanities and social science; the Davis Centre Library, housing material for engineering, mathematics and science; and the Witer Learning Resource Centre, housing material for the School of Optometry and Vision Science. The fourth library, the Musagetes Architecture Library, is in Cambridge, alongside the university's School of Architecture. The libraries of the university's affiliated colleges are also considered a part of the university's library system. Doris E. Lewis was the first University Librarian. The university's library system is also a member of the Tri-University Group, a partnership between the University of Guelph, the University of Waterloo and Wilfrid Laurier University that provides students and researchers at all three universities with access to all of the collections and services. The group also operates the TUG Annex, a repository for less-used library resources from the three universities.

University of Waterloo operates the Earth Sciences Museum, on campus in the Centre for Environmental Information Technology. It is mainly used as an earth-science teaching museum for local schools and natural-science interest groups in southern Ontario. The main exhibits cover the Great Lakes, rocks and minerals, dinosaurs and ice age mammals. The museum's fossil exhibit includes a complete cast of an Albertosaurus and an authentic skeleton of a cave bear. The museum also houses an interactive mining simulation tunnel which aims to teach sustainable mining practices.

In 2010, the University of Waterloo Computer Museum was founded informally and there began a grass-roots effort to preserve legacy computing hardware and software. The initiative placed a specific focus on Waterloo-related content. In 2022 the Museum was officially integrated with the David R. Cheriton School of Computer Science and received permanent exhibit spaces.

The Museum of Vision Science is located in the School of Optometry building. The university had previously operated the Elliott Avedon Museum and Archive of Games, created by the Department of Recreation and Leisure Studies and previously managed by the university's Faculty of Health. In 2009, the museum was closed.

=== Housing and student facilities ===
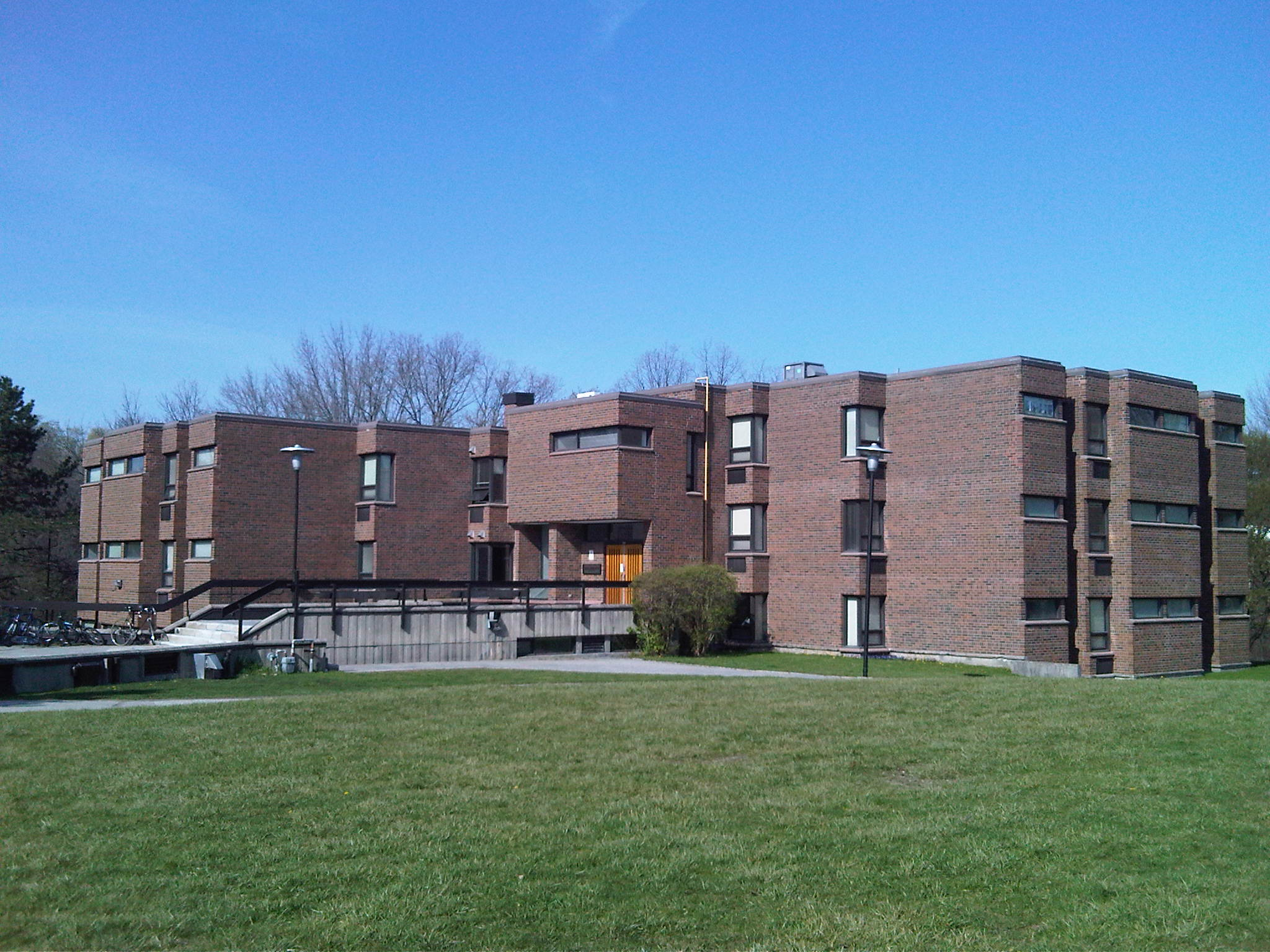
Minota Hagey Residence, one of eight residences at the university's main campus

The university has eight student residences: the Minota Hagey Residence, UW Place, Village 1 (the university's first residence), Ron Eydt Village, Mackenzie King Village, Columbia Lake North and South, and Claudette Millar Hall. In addition to the eight main campus residences, students may also apply to live at any of the university's affiliated college residences. The first residence built was Village 1, completed in 1966. Ron Eydt Village was still known as Village 2 in 1995 but had been renamed by 2000. The largest residential village at the university is UW Place, which houses 1,300 first-year students and 350 upper-year students, while the smallest residence is the Minota Hagey Residence, which houses 70 students and is almost exclusively for upper-year students. In September 2010, 24.9 per cent of the undergraduate population lived on campus, including 71.1 per cent of first-year students.

The Waterloo Co‑operative Residence Inc., a non-profit student housing co-operative not affiliated with the University of Waterloo, owns 13 buildings near the university and provides housing for more than 1300 students as of 2026. It is the largest student housing co-operative in North America.

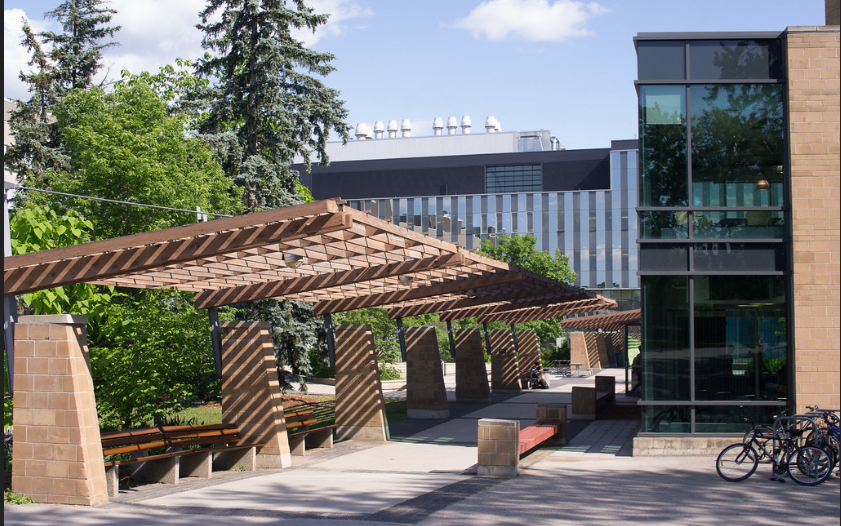
Exterior of the Student Life Centre with the Mike & Ophelia Lazaridis Quantum-Nano Centre in the background

The Student Life Centre is the centre of student governance. In 2017 ground broke on a joint 63,000 square foot expansion of the Student Life Centre and Physical Activities Complex. Built to the west of Burt Matthews Hall Green the expansion will connect all three floors with the Red North corner of the PAC providing social, fitness, study, multi-faith, dining, and bookable spaces for students. The project was initially projected to complete in Fall 2018; and was completed in September 2021.

=== Off-campus facilities ===
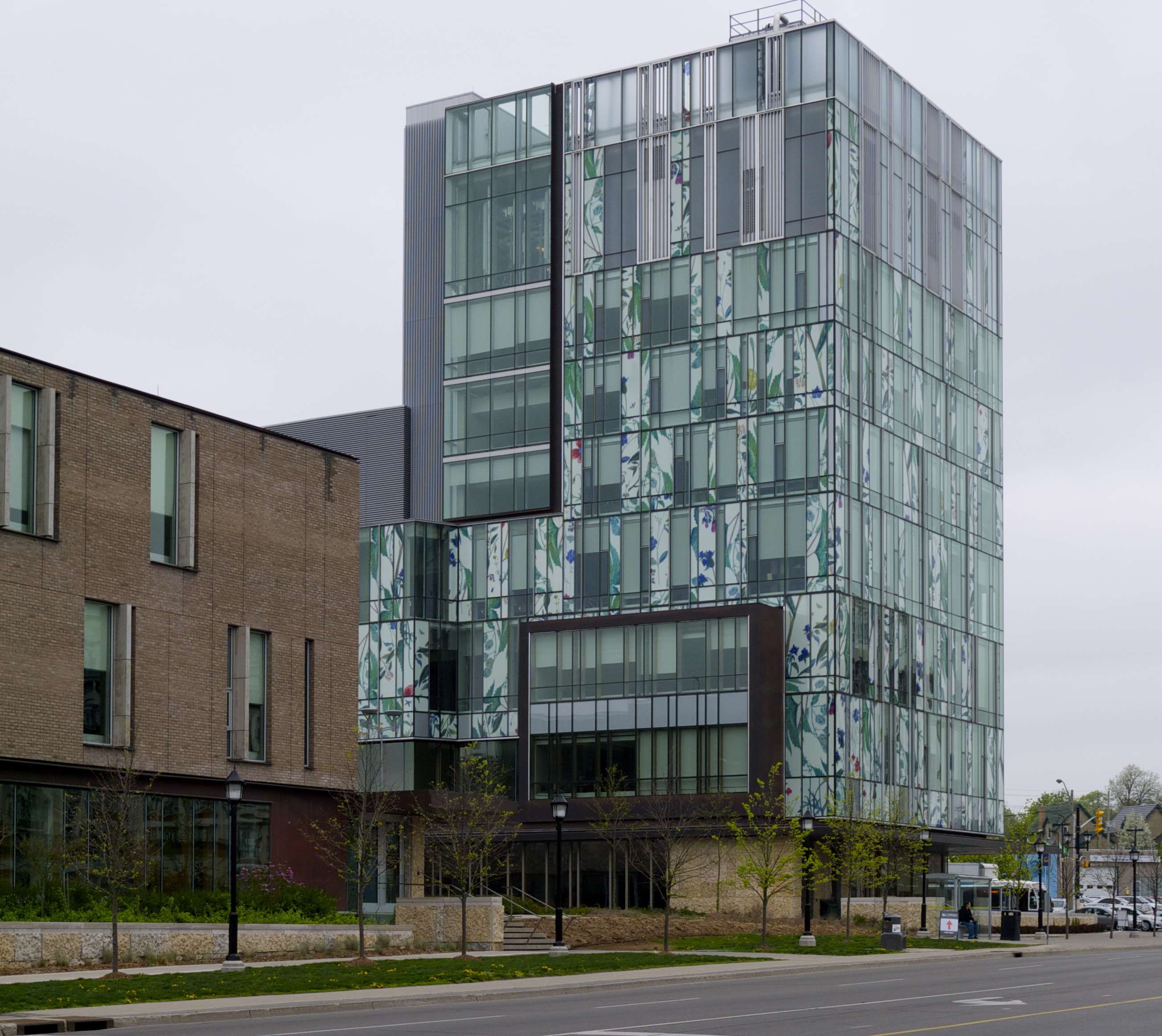
The university's School of Pharmacy based in Kitchener

The university has several satellite campuses and facilities throughout Southern Ontario. The closest off-campus facilities are adjacent to the campus, with the university acquiring land and five buildings from BlackBerry Ltd in December 2013. As of February 2014, the university uses three of the buildings, and leases the other two to BlackBerry Ltd.

The Centre for Extended Learning in Kitchener, Ontario is a facility that is owned and managed by the university. The centre provides pre-university courses, part-time studies, online learning and professional development courses. In addition to the Centre for Extended Learning, Kitchener also holds the university's School of Pharmacy. The pharmacy building was designed by Siamak Hariri, and was completed in December 2008. While the School of Pharmacy acts as the anchor institution of this campus, other students and faculty of the university's Faculty of Applied Health Sciences also use the facilities. McMaster University's medical school makes use of the campus as its base for its Waterloo Regional Campus, with 56 of the medical school's students admitted at the regional campus in 2012. Wilfrid Laurier University's School of Social Work also uses some of the facilities available on the campus.

The university also operates the Stratford School of Interaction Design and Business in Stratford, Ontario. The focus for the Stratford campus is on education in digital arts and media. The idea for the Stratford campus first took shape when the City of Stratford and the university signed a memorandum in October 2006. It officially opened in September 2010. In November 2009, the university also signed a memorandum of understanding with the University of Western Ontario regarding academic initiatives at the Stratford Campus. The campus also hosted the first four Canada 3.0 forums before its move to Toronto in 2012.

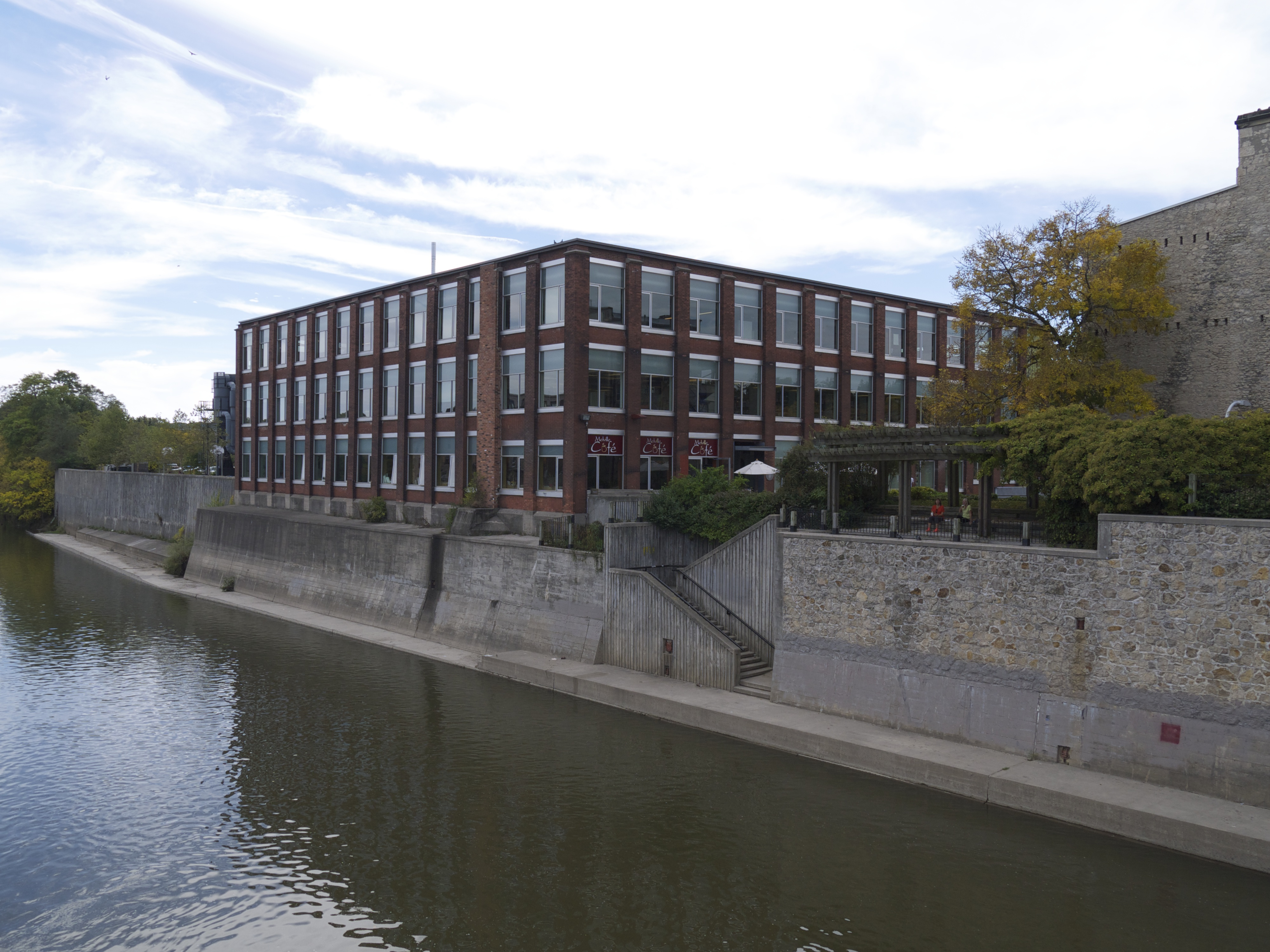
Main building in Cambridge, Ontario

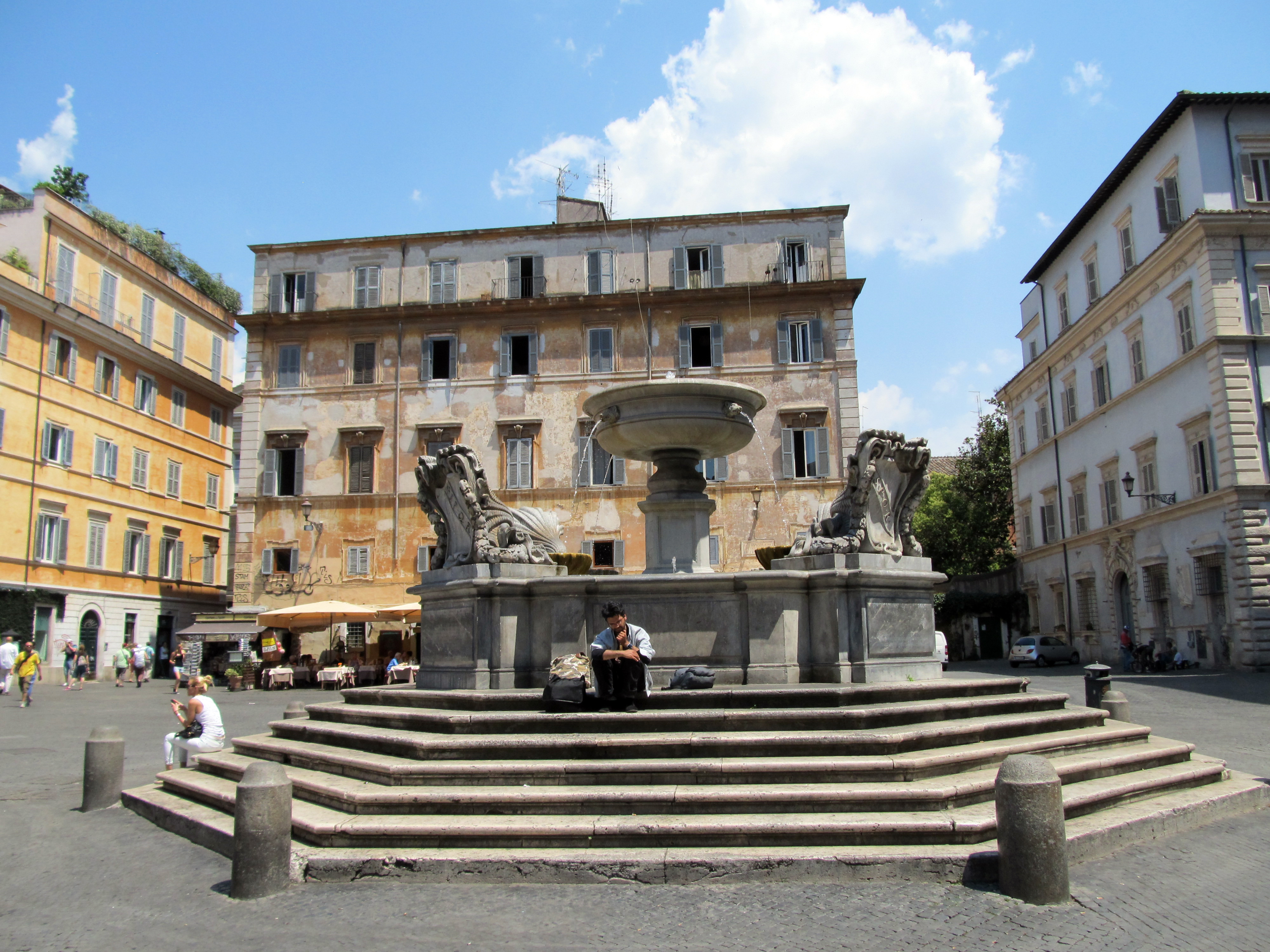
Trastevere studio, Rome

The university's School of Architecture operates from several off-campus facilities

The university's School of Architecture uses a campus in Cambridge, Ontario, on the west bank of the Grand River. The architecture campus was the idea of the Cambridge Consortium, a group of Cambridge business owners, who spearheaded the school's fundraising drive to cover a portion of the $27 million cost of creating the new campus. The school, along with its faculty and students, was moved to the new campus in September 2004. Since 1979, the School of Architecture has also operated an architecture studio in Rome, Italy in the Trastevere neighbourhood. The opportunity to work at the Trastevere studio is offered to fourth-year architecture students.

Another facility which is owned and managed by the university is the Waterloo Summit Centre for the Environment, in Huntsville, Ontario. It is a year-round research and teaching centre, which regularly hosts post-secondary student field courses and professional development programs, and also serves as a university outreach facility for the whole region. Close to Algonquin and Arrowhead Provincial Park, the centre's facilities are used for research in ecological restoration and conservation.

=== Sustainability ===
Sustainability initiatives are divided between several departmental offices at the university, with the university's plant operations charged with their implementation. Prior to 2005, the management of sustainability efforts was conducted by the university's waste management coordinator. The university's sustainability initiatives are solely institution-specific, as it has not signed any national or international sustainability declaration. However, the university, along with the other members from the Council of Ontario Universities, signed a pledge in 2009 known as Ontario Universities Committed to a Greener World, with the objective of transforming its campus into a model of environmental responsibility.

The university's School of Environment, Enterprise and Development placed first in Canada in the Corporate Knights 2011 ranking for undergraduate business programs incorporating sustainability. The university campus received a C+ grade from the Sustainable Endowments Institute on its College Sustainability Report Card for 2011. In 2021, the University of Waterloo was ranked 99th in the world, and 15th in Canada in Times Higher Education University Impact Rankings, a ranking that evaluated 1,115 universities from 94 countries/regions against the United Nations’ Sustainable Development Goals. A dramatic drop from 2020's ranking of 16th in the world.

Waterloo's Institute for Nanotechnology is Canada's largest nanotechnology institute committed to the UN Sustainable Development Goals.

== Administration ==
The university operates under a bicameral system of a board of governors and a senate, as legislated by the University of Waterloo Act, 1972. The Board of Governors has responsibility for the university's properties, affairs, and income. The University of Waterloo Act calls for only 36 members, each of whom must hold Canadian citizenship. However, the number of members in the board for the 2013–2014 academic year is 40. The Board has five ex officio members, including the university's chancellor, president and vice-chancellor, and the mayors of Kitchener and Waterloo. The other 32 members of the board are either elected or appointed by the various members of the university community, including alumni, faculty, and student body. The current and eighth president and vice-chancellor of the University of Waterloo, Bill Rosehart, began his five-year term on July 1, 2026. He is the first alumnus of the university to hold the office.

=== Affiliated institutions ===
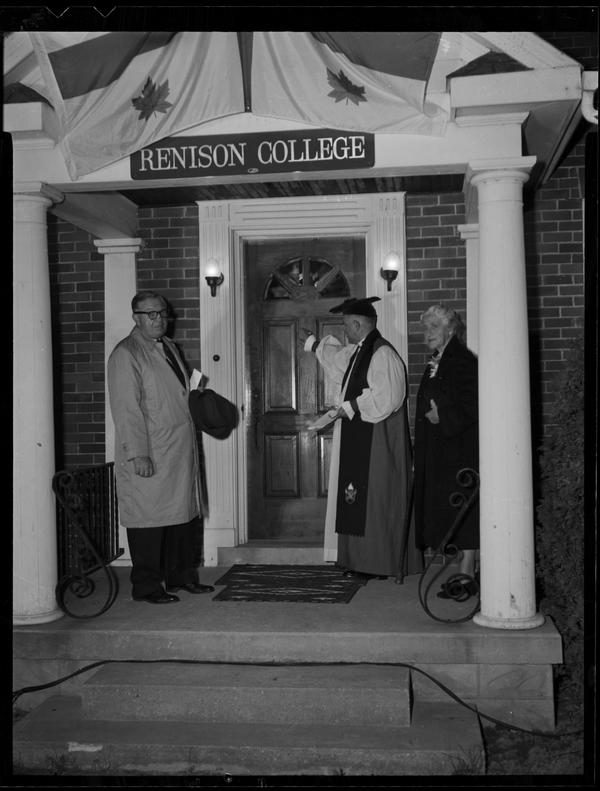
Opening of Renison University College in 1959. The university college is one of three affiliated institutions of the University of Waterloo

The university also includes three semi-autonomous affiliated colleges and a federated university. Conrad Grebel University College is a Mennonite university college that was chartered in 1961 and is religiously affiliated with the Mennonite Church Eastern Canada. Renison University College is an Anglican university college chartered in 1959; it entered an affiliation with the University of Waterloo in 1960 and is religiously affiliated with the Anglican Church of Canada. St. Jerome's University is a Roman Catholic university, founded in 1865, which entered into a federation with the University of Waterloo shortly after the provincial government granted it university status in 1959. United College is a university college founded by members of the United Church of Canada in 1962. However, United College now operates independently from the United Church, without any formal or legal relationship.

=== Finances ===
The university completed the 2014–2015 academic year with revenues of $936.240 million and expenses of $906.730 million, yielding a surplus of $29.510 million. Grants and contracts make up the largest source of revenue for the university, totaling $392.357 million, followed by academic fees at $357.889 million. Salaries make up nearly half of the university's expenses, at $439.973 million. As of 30 April 2015, the university's endowment is valued at $335.731 million.

== Academics ==
Waterloo is a publicly funded research university, and a member of the Association of Universities and Colleges of Canada. It functions on a term-based system, with fall, winter and spring terms. Undergraduate programs comprise the majority of the school's enrolment, made up of 24,377 full-time and part-time undergraduate students. The university conferred 5,741 bachelor's degrees and first professional degrees, 1,605 master's degrees, 332 doctoral degrees, during the 2016–2017 academic school year. The university is organized into six faculties, which operate a combined total of thirteen schools and over fifty academic departments.

Faculties and Schools of the University of Waterloo
Faculty	School
Health	School of Public Health Sciences
Arts	School of Accounting and Finance
Arts	Stratford School of Interaction Design and Business
Arts	Balsillie School of International Affairs (Note: Partnership with the Centre for International Governance Innovation, and Wilfrid Laurier University.)
Arts	Renison School of Social Work (Note: Operated by Renison University College)
Engineering	School of Architecture
Engineering	Conrad School of Entrepreneurship and Business
Environment	School of Environment, Enterprise and Development
Environment	School of Environment, Resources and Sustainability
Environment	School of Planning
Mathematics	David R. Cheriton School of Computer Science
Science	School of Optometry and Vision Science
Science	School of Pharmacy

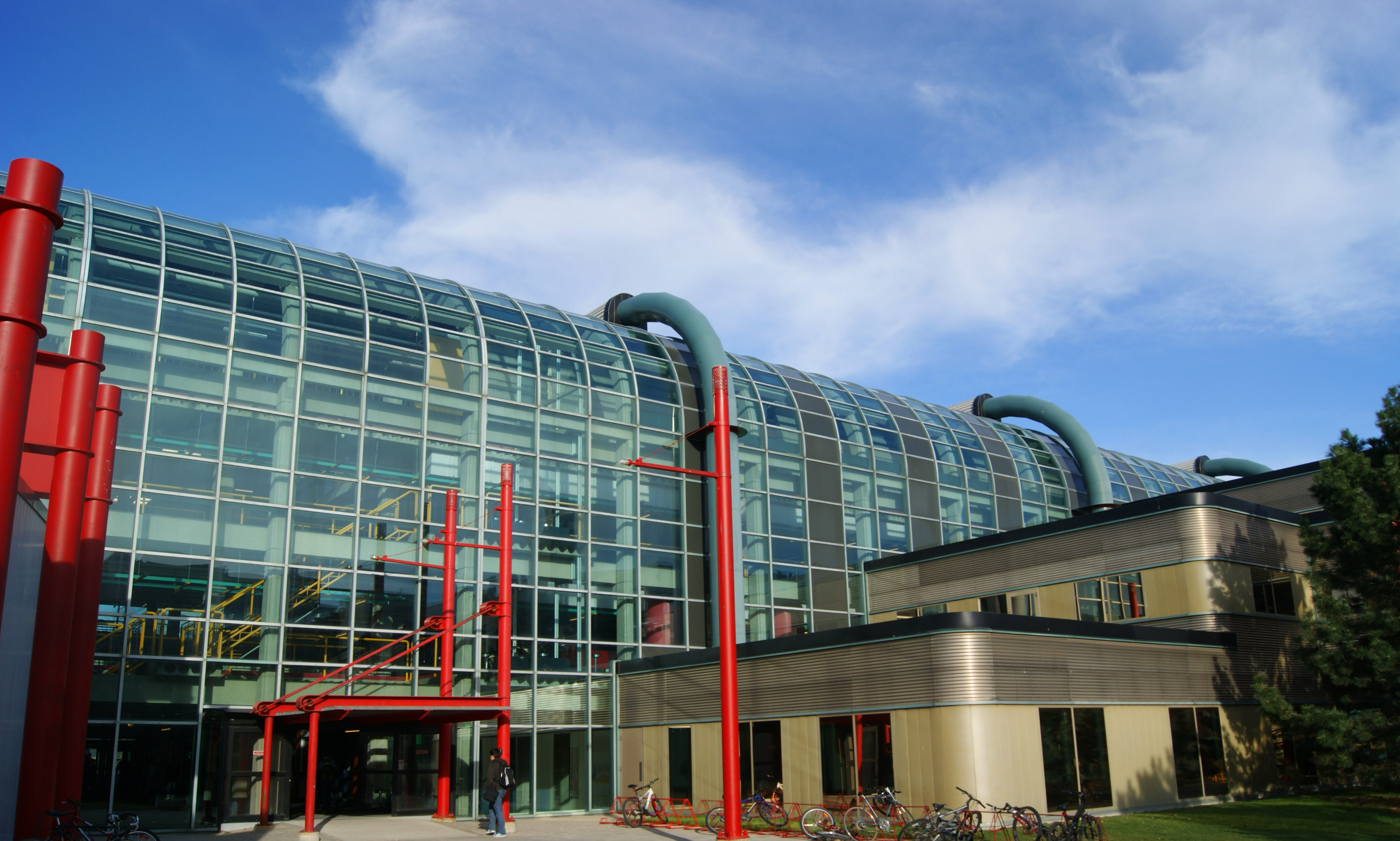
The William G. Davis Computer Research Centre houses teaching facilities and a library for engineering, mathematics and science.

Financial aid available to students includes the Ontario Student Assistance Program and Canada Student Loans and Grants through the federal and provincial governments. The financial aid provided may come in the form of loans, grants, bursaries, scholarships, fellowships, debt reduction, interest relief, and work programs.

The university has also partnered with other institutions for the purposes of jointly operating a graduate program. The Balsillie School of International Affairs (BSIA) is a graduate school and research centre operated in partnership with the Centre for International Governance Innovation and Wilfrid Laurier University. The Perimeter's Scholar International program is another graduate program operated in partnership with the Perimeter Institute for Theoretical Physics, in which its graduates receive a Master of Science from the University of Waterloo. The university also offers its students the opportunity to earn credits towards their degree while studying abroad through student exchange and international internship programs. The university has exchange agreements with over 100 institutions outside Canada.

=== Co-operative education ===
The university operates the largest post-secondary co-operative education (co-op) program in the world with over 20,000 undergraduate students. For co-op students, each term acts as either a study term or a work term depending on their co-op sequencing, typically for the entire length of their degree. Co-op work terms are mandatory for all undergraduate engineering programs, as well as several arts and mathematics programs, and are optional for most other programs offered at the school. Engineering and Mathematics students are typically required to complete five out their six scheduled work terms to graduate from their program, while students from other faculties typically need to complete four out of five work terms. Engineering students alternate between school and work terms, completing a total of eight study terms and six work terms in the span of four and two-thirds years. However, some programs have unique co-op streams where consecutive school and work terms are scheduled near the end of the program, giving the students the opportunity to apply for eight-month positions.

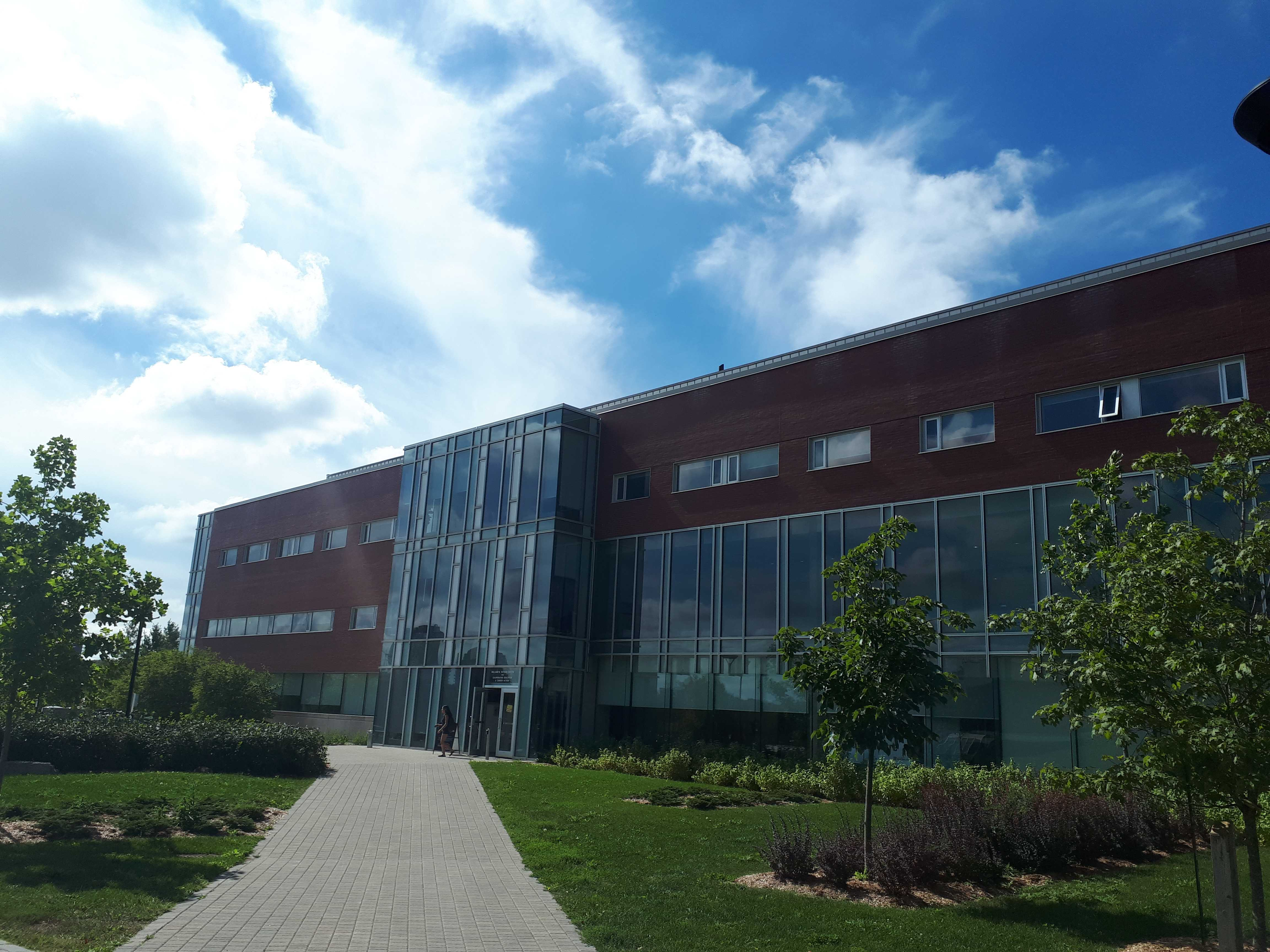
The William M. Tatham Centre, home to the Centre for Career Action, and where employers visit campus to conduct interviews with co-op students

Students are responsible for securing their work placement for each of their co-op terms. This includes applying for positions and attending interviews during their study terms. Scheduling conflicts between interviews and exams are actively avoided but still possible, in which case one or the other are rescheduled, with the examination taking precedence. In order for the student to receive their co-op credit, their work term must meet a number of conditions. This includes being full-time, that it is related to the student's field of study, that it lasts for the full 16-week duration, and that it is compensated with at least the minimum wage in the location of work. Exceptions can be made for some of these conditions; for example, first work terms often do not have to be related to the student's field of study, especially if the student has had difficulty securing a position.

At the end of the work term, the employer submits a performance evaluation for the student which is presented to the student's future employers during their next application stage. As of 2024, the university reports that its co-op students earn an average of CA$15,500 per work term when working in Canada. However, co-op earnings vary greatly depending on field of study, how many work terms the student has already completed, and where the work term takes place. Several programs where co-op is mandatory report high levels of employment from their graduation, with 98 per cent of graduates from the Accounting and Financial Management, Math/CPA, Biotech/CPA, and Master of Accounting programs reporting that they found employment within six months after graduating. In the same year, the graduates of the university's Master of Taxation co-op program reported that 100 per cent of its students secured full-time employment prior to graduating.

=== Rankings and reputation ===
University rankings

World rankings
- ARWU World: 151–200
- QS World: =119
- THE World: =163
- THE Employability: 190
- USNWR World: =192
- 6–8

Canadian rankings
- QS National: 5
- THE National: 7
- USNWR National: 7
- Maclean's Comprehensive: 3
- Maclean's Reputation: 4

The 2024 QS World University Rankings ranked the university 115th in the world and fifth in Canada. (Note: Although the title of these annual ranking includes the year 2023, the following was published in 2022.) The 2024 Times Higher Education World University Rankings placed Waterloo 158 in the world and 7 in Canada, and between 126 and 150 in its 2023 World Reputation Rankings. In the U.S. News & World Report 2022–23 ranking, the university placed 191st in the world, and eighth in Canada, tied with the University of Ottawa. In the 2022 Academic Ranking of World Universities, the university ranked 151–200 in the world and 7–8 in Canada.

In terms of national rankings, Maclean's 2023 university rankings ranked Waterloo third in the magazine's comprehensive university category. The university also placed second in Maclean's 2023 reputational survey of Canadian universities.

The university also placed in a number of rankings that evaluated a graduate's employment prospects. In QS's 2022 graduate employability ranking, Waterloo ranked 24th in the world, and second in Canada. In the Times Higher Education 2022 graduate employability ranking, Waterloo was ranked 191st in the world, and ninth in Canada. In an employability survey published by The New York Times in October 2011, when CEOs and chairpersons were asked to select the top universities which they recruited from, the university placed 108th in the world, and seventh in Canada. In 2014, a study from Riviera Partners found that the University of Waterloo had the third-most hired undergraduate candidates in Silicon Valley. In 2016, Startup Compass found that University of Waterloo alumni were the second-most frequently hired in small and medium-sized companies in Silicon Valley. Dr. Steven Woods, engineering director at Google in Canada, said in 2013 that "the University of Waterloo is one of Google's largest three or four recruiting universities year-over-year [worldwide], along with MIT and Carnegie Mellon." In 2014, Business Insider found via LinkedIn data that the University of Waterloo has the fourth-most alumni working at Facebook, and the third-most alumni working at Amazon.

=== Research ===
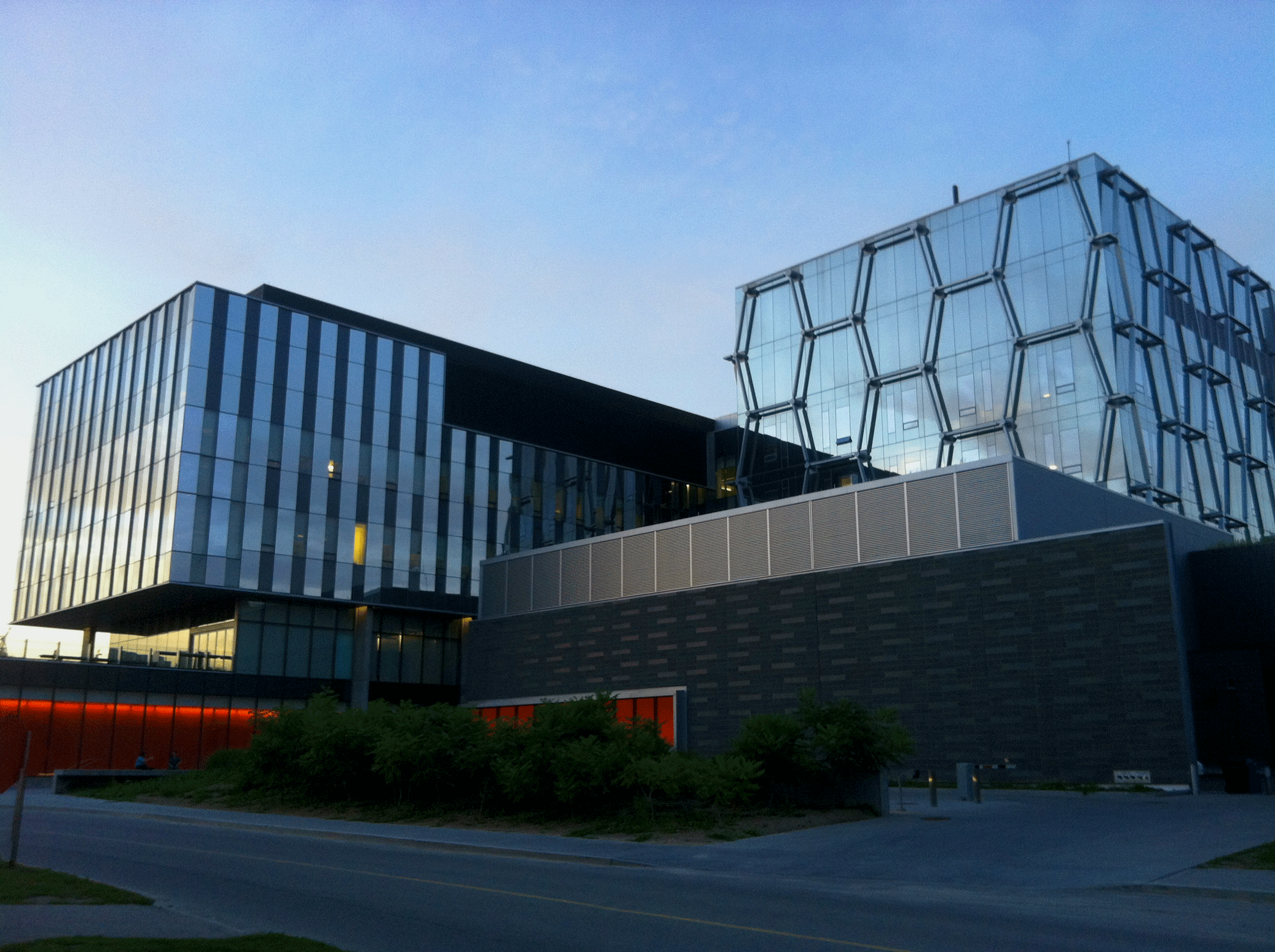
The university's institutes for both nanotechnology and quantum computing are in the Mike & Ophelia Lazaridis Quantum-Nano Centre.

The University of Waterloo is a member of the U15, a group that represents 15 Canadian research universities. In 2018, Research Infosource ranked Waterloo 12th on their list of top 50 Canadian research universities, with a sponsored research income (external sources of funding) of $189.333 million in 2017. In the same year, the university's faculty averaged a sponsored research income of $163,100, while graduate students averaged a sponsored research income of $34,700. Research funds comes from private, and public sources. In 2019, the university has received over C$15 million in research funding from Huawei.

Waterloo's research performance has been noted several bibliometric university rankings, which uses citation analysis to evaluates the impact a university has on academic publications. In 2019, the Performance Ranking of Scientific Papers for World Universities ranked Waterloo 242nd in the world, and 10th in Canada. The University Ranking by Academic Performance 2018–19 rankings placed the university 191st in the world, and 10th in Canada.

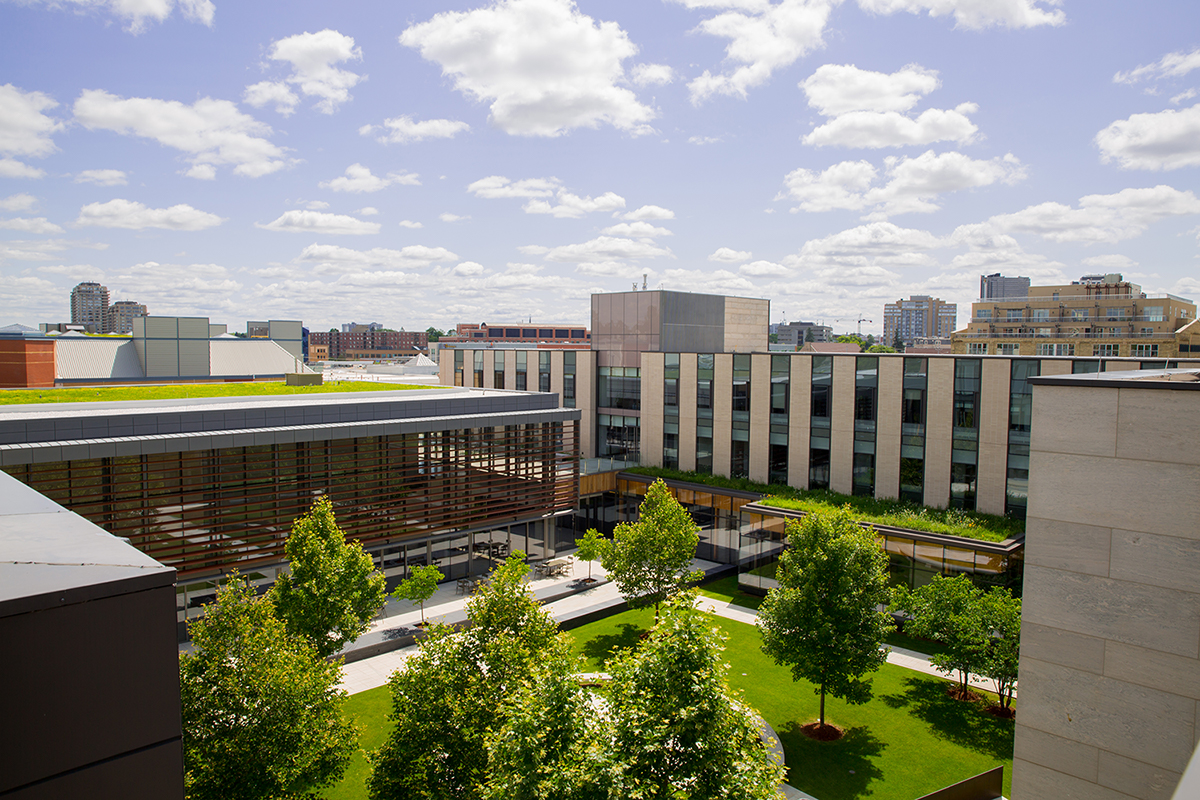
The Balsillie School of International Affairs at the CIGI Campus. The institution is a graduate school and research centre established in partnership with Waterloo.

The university operates and manages 41 research centres and institutes, including the Centre for Applied Cryptographic Research, the Waterloo Institute for Nanotechnology, the Centre for Education in Mathematics and Computing, the Institute for Quantum Computing, and the Centre for Theoretical Neuroscience. Official recognition and designation of all centres and institutes requires the approval of the university's Senate. On 6 April 2018, the University of Waterloo announced the launching of the Waterloo Artificial Intelligence Institute, now the Waterloo Data & Artificial Intelligence Institute (Waterloo.AI).

The university has undertaken several research partnerships with other institutions. In 2007, the Balsillie School of International Affairs (BSIA) was established as a graduate school and research centre in partnership with the University of Waterloo. BSIA operates three research centres relating to public governance and public policy. In 2016, Facebook hardware development division announced a partnership with Waterloo, along with 16 other post-secondary institutions, as Facebook explores new revenue streams in virtual reality, cybersecurity, and other areas of research. In 2019, Microsoft announced a partnership with Waterloo's Artificial Intelligence Institute worth $115 million over five years as part of Microsoft's broader AI For Good Initiative. Waterloo's Artificial Intelligence Institute is an interdisciplinary initiative involving the researchers from faculties of arts, engineering, mathematics, and computer science.

During the COVID-19 pandemic, researchers at the Waterloo Institute for Nanotechnology worked in collaboration with SiO2 Innovation Labs to develop a coating that kills the virus upon impact. The antiviral coating could be applied to all personal protective equipment and high-touch surfaces. This research was supported by both the Natural Sciences and Engineering Research Council of Canada and Mitacs. The school also received a $499,935 grant from the Public Health Agency of Canada's Immunization Partnership Fund to engage health care professionals and community leaders to combat COVID-19 misinformation and increase acceptance of COVID-19 vaccines.

=== Admission ===
The requirements for admission differ between students from Ontario, students from other provinces in Canada, and international students, due to the lack of uniformity in marking schemes. The minimum averages required for these programs are determined each year based on the number and qualification of applicants and the number of available spaces. As of 2021, the secondary school average for first year, full-time students at the University of Waterloo was at 92.7 per cent. In 2023, 65 per cent of new students at Waterloo had a high school average equal to or greater than 90 per cent, and 33.2 per cent had an average equal to or greater than 95 per cent.

In the case of admission into the Engineering and Math faculties, there is a large weighting given to the applicant's supplementary application, extracurricular involvement, adjustment factors for individual high schools, and an admissions video interview. Thus, it is possible to receive an offer with an average much lower than the mean admission average. The retention rate of the university's first-time, full-time first-year students in 2022 was 93.6 per cent.

== Student life ==
Demographics of student body (2017–18) (Note: The following includes both full-time, and part-time students.)
	Undergraduate (Note: The following includes both undergraduates, and students enrolled in first professional degree programs.)	Graduate
Male	52.7%	55.9%
Female	47.3%	44.1%
Canadian student	82.7%	63.9%
International student	17.3%	36.1%

=== Organizations ===
The university's two main student unions are the Waterloo Undergraduate Student Association (WUSA) for undergraduate students, and the Graduate Student Association (GSA) for graduate students. Founded in 1967 as the Federation of Students, WUSA operates four businesses, twelve student services, oversees over 200 accredited student clubs; in addition to operating other student programs and events. Among the WUSA student groups are the Glow Centre for Sexual and Gender Diversity, Canada's oldest, continually running university-based 2SLGBTQ+ group, and the University of Waterloo Undergraduate Furry Club, which has spoken at prominent furry conventions such as Furnal Equinox as part of the national furry student network.

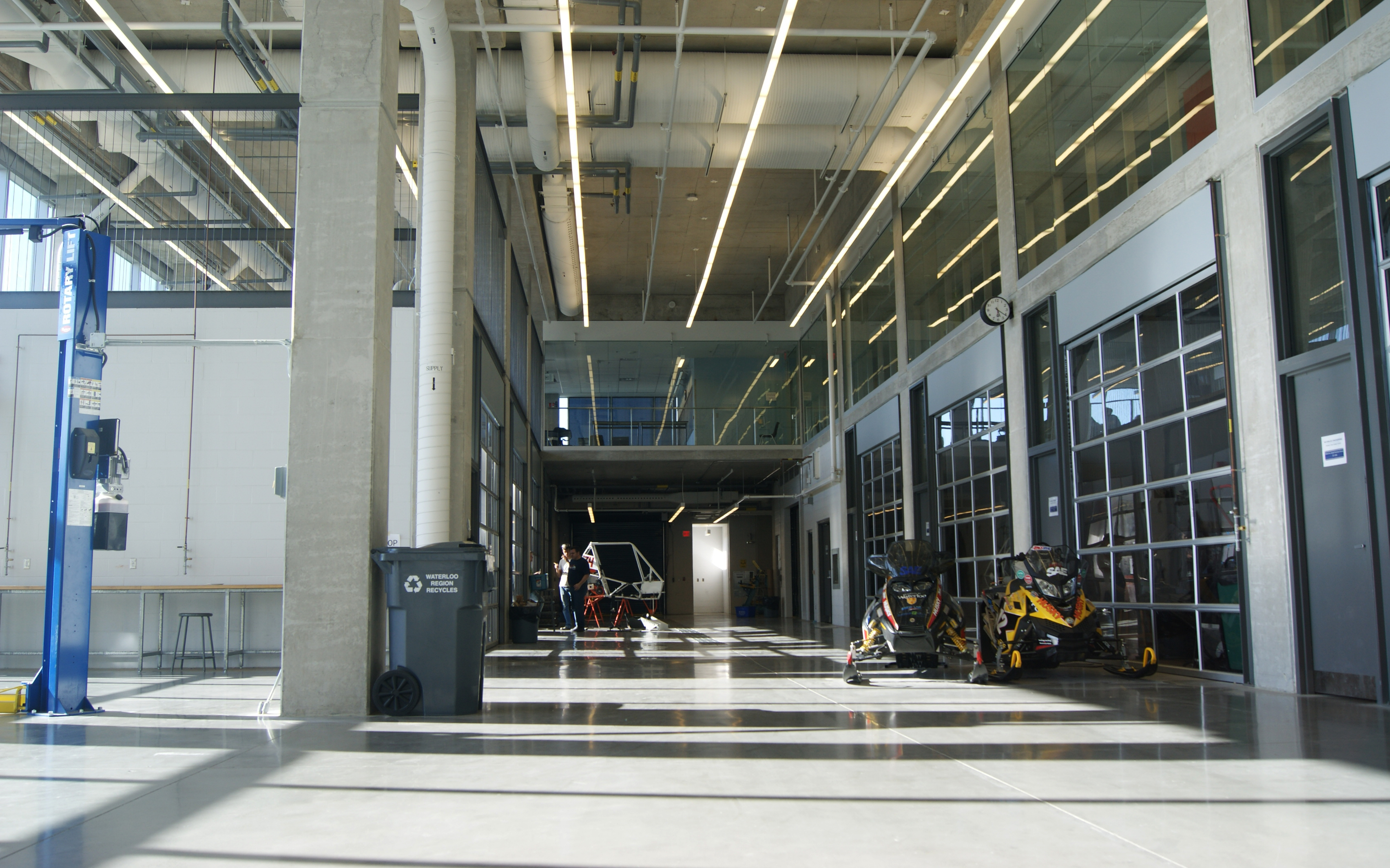
The Sedra Student Design Centre, where student design teams work on projects such as making an autonomous vehicle or a Hyperloop pod prototype.

Each of the university's faculties has a student society which represent and provide services for the students in their respective faculties. Services include online exam banks, resume critiques, and technical skills workshops. Some student societies also operate a student deal discount program and one to two shops selling coffee and food at low prices. Each faculty also operates a student-run endowment fund, which fund student design teams, laboratory upgrades, and services for their respective student societies.

=== Journalism ===
The three main student publications on campus are Imprint, the university's official student newspaper, mathNEWS, the Math Society's free-form publication, and The Iron Warrior, the Engineering Society's newspaper. Imprint replaced The Chevron as the official student newspaper in 1979, and publishes a monthly print magazine along with regular online content. mathNEWS and The Iron Warrior publish biweekly in print and online throughout the year.

The university formerly included a student-funded campus radio station, CKMS-FM. The student union withdrew financial support for the stations' operations in 2008 following several referendums, and CKMS transitioned to a community radio model.

==== mathNEWS ====
mathNEWS is the freeform student publication of the undergraduate mathematics students of the University of Waterloo as represented by MathSoc (the Mathematics Society of the University of Waterloo). Labeling itself as "Waterloo's Bastion of Erudite Thought", mathNEWS is published biweekly, with occasional deviations and special editions. The paper is varied in its content, with think pieces, local updates, and exercises in creative writing, usually through a humorous lens. Though it has a cult following, the paper gained worldwide attention in February 2024 after publishing an article exposing the usage of facial recognition in on-campus vending machines.

mathNEWS has been in publication since January 25, 1973, when it was published on a weekly basis, and was technically a club under MathSoc. On February 14, 1975, it switched to a biweekly publication schedule, which it maintains as of April 1, 2024.

=== Athletics ===
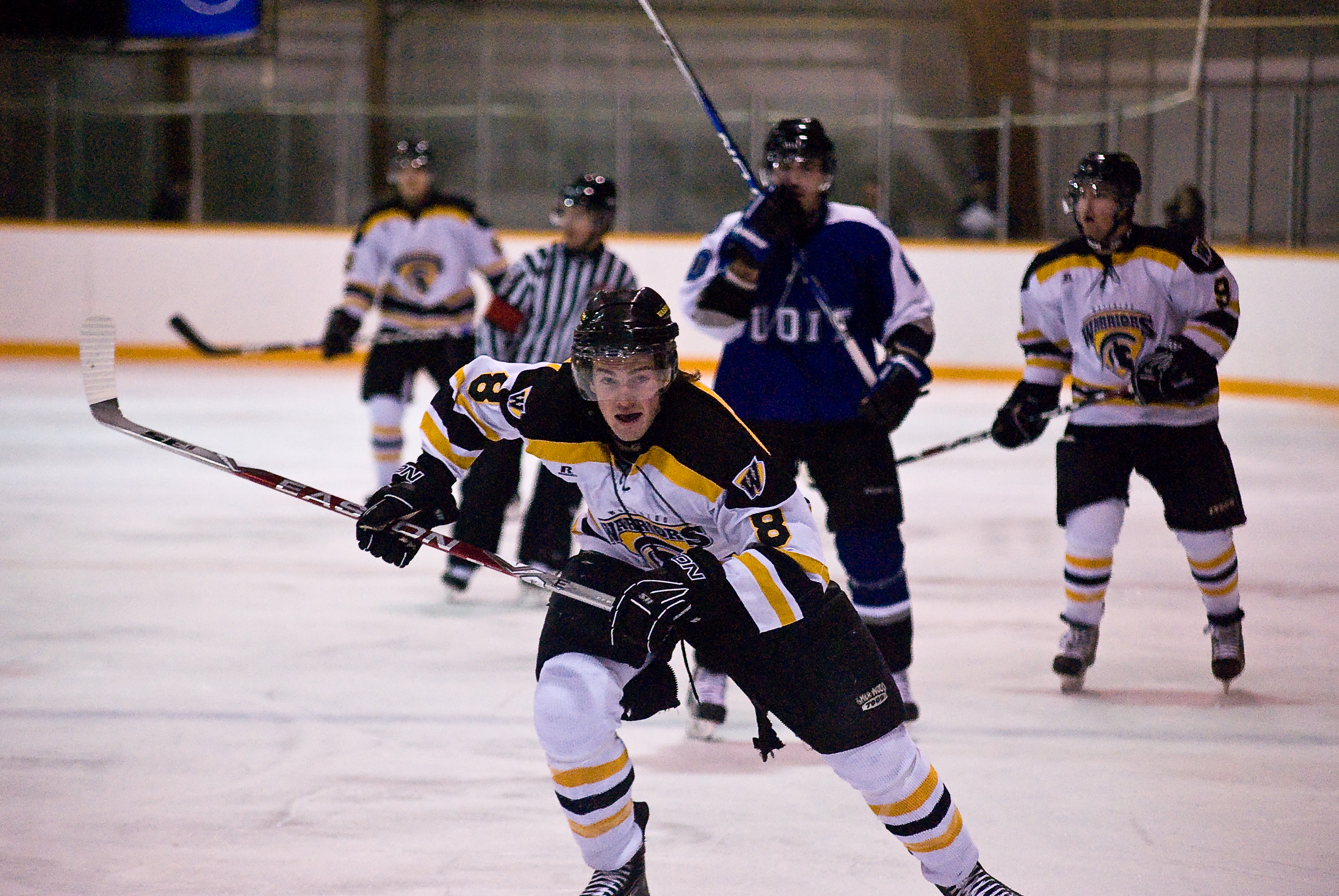
The Waterloo Warriors men's ice hockey team is one of several varsity sports teams operated by the university

The university's sports teams are known as the Waterloo Warriors. They participate in the Canadian Interuniversity Sports' Ontario University Athletics conference for most varsity sports. Varsity teams include badminton, baseball, basketball, cross country, curling, field hockey, figure skating, Canadian football, golf, hockey, Nordic skiing, rugby, soccer, squash, swimming, track and field, tennis and volleyball. The athletics program at the university dates back to 1957, when students of Waterloo College Associate Faculties participated in the sports program of Waterloo College. The university had its own independent team when the Associate Faculties officially became the University of Waterloo. The university's varsity teams and the university's recreational sports programs are operated and managed by the Department of Athletics and Recreational Activity.

The university has a number of athletic facilities open to varsity teams and other students. Seating 5,400 people, Warrior Field is the university's largest stadium by seating capacity; and is used as the home field for the varsity field hockey and football teams, and hosts the university's recreational flag football and soccer activities. Prior to the completion of Warrior Field in 2008, the university's varsity teams used Seagram Stadium as their home stadium. Seagram Stadium was built by the university's predecessor, Waterloo College Associate Faculties, and remained under the ownership of the university until 1974, when it was sold to the City of Waterloo. However, the university continued to use Seagram Stadium until 2008.

Other facilities include the Physical Activity Complex, which houses two gymnasiums, beach volleyball courts, squash rooms, and a swimming pool, and is also home to the university's varsity badminton, basketball, squash, swimming and volleyball teams. The Columbia Ice Field was constructed in 1983 and houses the university's hockey team home rink, with a seating capacity of 700. The Ice Field has been expanded twice, in 1990 and 2003, and now includes three gyms and a number of fitness centres. Including the football field, the university manages seven outdoor playing fields, with Fields 1 and 2 reserved for the varsity soccer and rugby teams, while portions of Field 3 are used as a baseball field. The rest of the fields are used by the university's recreational sports programs.

=== Entrepreneurship ===
The University of Waterloo operates a startup incubator for its students, faculty, and alumni called the Velocity program. With no fees or equity, it is the largest free startup incubator in the world. It offers office space for up to 120 startup companies, as well as a wet laboratory, assembly space, workshop, and prototyping lab. The program also provides business mentorship to its resident companies and to Waterloo students as well as partnerships with researchers at the university's main campus. Velocity provides some students and startups with grants, previously valued from C$5,000 to C$25,000. As of 2019, the $25,000 grant was removed and companies in Velocity may now pitch their ideas to instead receive C$50,000 in funding, with equity stakes from investors. Companies that emerged from the Velocity program include Maluuba.

In addition to the resources provided by Velocity, alumni regularly receive funding for their startups from United States accelerators. Companies Waterloo alumni have founded with the aid of Silicon Valley accelerator Y Combinator include Pebble and Bufferbox. Y Combinator founder Paul Graham and president Sam Altman have both noted the University of Waterloo has stood out to them more than any other school during Y Combinator applications.

In 2017, Pitchbook Data ranked the University of Waterloo's undergraduate program fourth for schools that have the greatest number of alumni who have founded unicorn startups. As of the same year, Waterloo students and alumni have raised a cumulative US$3.662 billion in venture capital. The current unicorn startups from Waterloo are Wish, Instacart, Kik Messenger, Pivotal Software, and Storm8.

=== Traditions ===
Some traditions at the University of Waterloo include the University of Waterloo Aphrodite Project, an annual student-run matchmaking event where thousands of students complete a psychology questionnaire and get matched with their most ideal date on campus.

== Insignia and other representations ==
The University of Waterloo's coat of arms has been used as a symbol of the institution since 1961, with the coat of arms also being used in the logo of the university, and its academic faculties and departments. The university's colours are black, gold, and white, and may be found on the university's coat of arms.

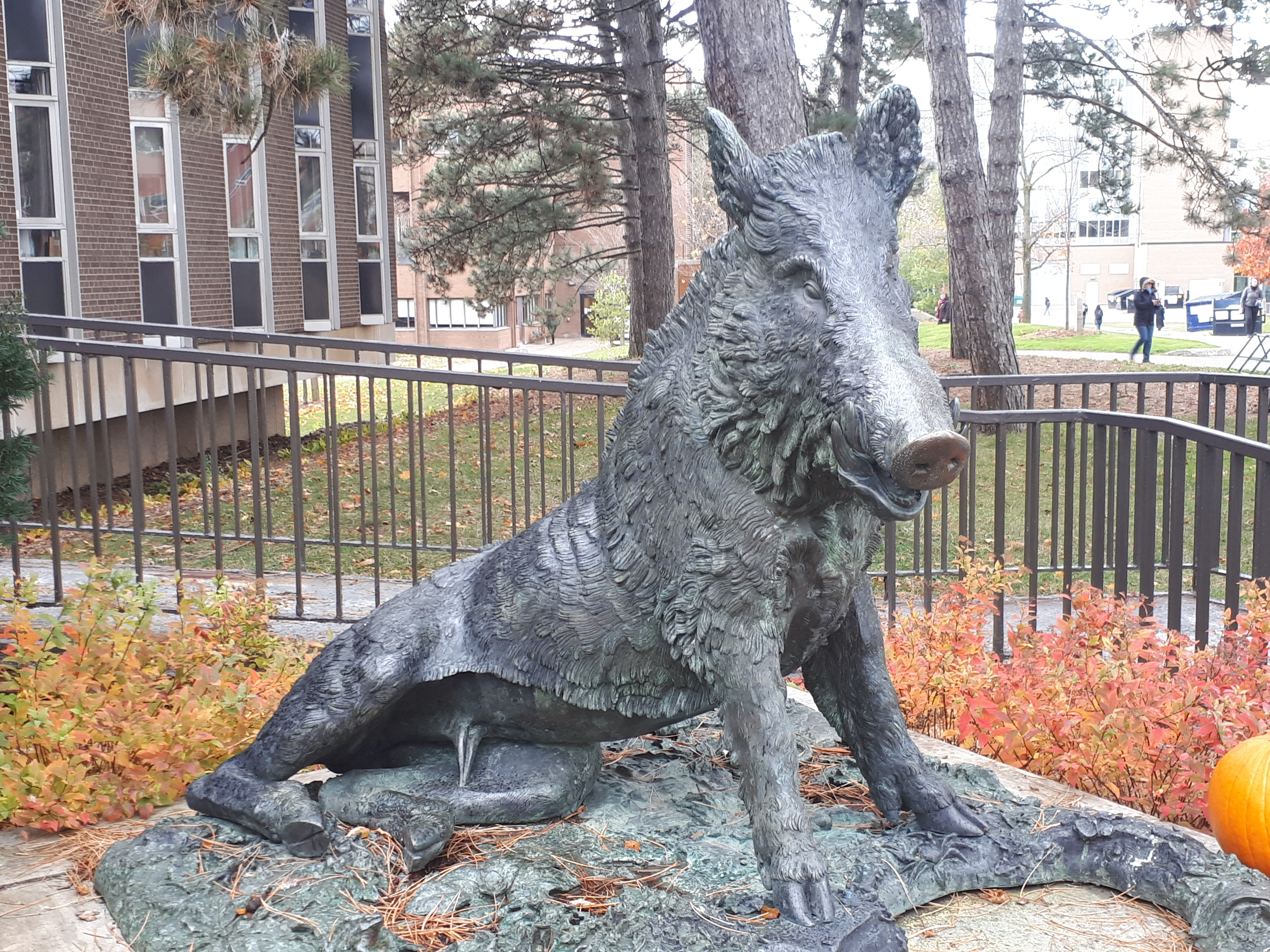
A copy of the Porcellino sculpture outside the Modern Languages Building serves as a mascot for the Faculty of Arts

The school also maintains official colours to represent the academic faculties of the university. They consist of pink for the Faculty of Math, purple for the Faculty of Engineering, blue for the Faculty of Science, teal for the Faculty of Health, green for the Faculty of Environment, orange for the Faculty of Arts, and red for other schools and satellite campuses operated by the university. Other objects have also been used to represent the faculties of the university. For example, mathematics students have used pink neckties to represent their faculty since 1968, when a 21 metres (68 ft) pink tie was placed on the exterior of the Mathematics & Computer Building during the building's opening, while engineering students use a 150 centimetres (60 in) pipe wrench made by Ridgid as their mascot since 1968. A copy of the statue of Porcellino at the university's Modern Languages Building is also used as a mascot for the Faculty of Arts. The statue was donated to the university in 1978, and was placed at the Modern Languages Building. Other mascots that represent the university's faculties include a blue dinosaur for the Faculty of Science, a kangaroo for the Faculty of Health, and a banana for the Faculty of Environment.

=== Coat of arms ===
The university's coat of arms was first used by the university in October 1961, but was only officially granted by the Lord Lyon King of Arms in August 1987. It was not registered with the Canadian Heraldic Authority until 15 February 2001. Four variations of the coat of arms existed. The first was used from 1961 to 1996, when the second bright-yellow shield using slightly different shaped lions was introduced. The yellow background was dulled in 2000, and finally, the original lions were reintroduced in 2010 in conjunction with the attempt to replace the use of the coat of arms with a futuristic W logo. The new logo was eventually rejected after student opposition.

The red-on-gold lions on the university's arms were adopted from those of Arthur Wellesley, 1st Duke of Wellington, who defeated Napoleon at the Battle of Waterloo. The City of Waterloo was named after an area just south of Brussels, Belgium, where the battle occurred. The chevron on the arms was taken from the arms of Herbert Kitchener, 1st Earl Kitchener, Field Marshal with the British Army during World War I. The black and white pattern used on the chevron was based on the colours of Prussia, as homage to the German heritage of the area. The City of Kitchener was originally known as Berlin, but was renamed after Earl Kitchener in 1916 during World War I.

=== Motto and songs ===
The university's Latin motto is Concordia cum veritate, translated as "In Harmony with Truth". It was introduced along with the university coat of arms in October 1961. A number of songs are commonly played and sung at various events such as commencement, convocation, and athletic contests. The main song of the university is known as the "Black and White and Gold". The words were written by K. D. Fryer and H. F. Davis, while the music was composed by Alfred Kunz.

== Notable alumni and faculty ==
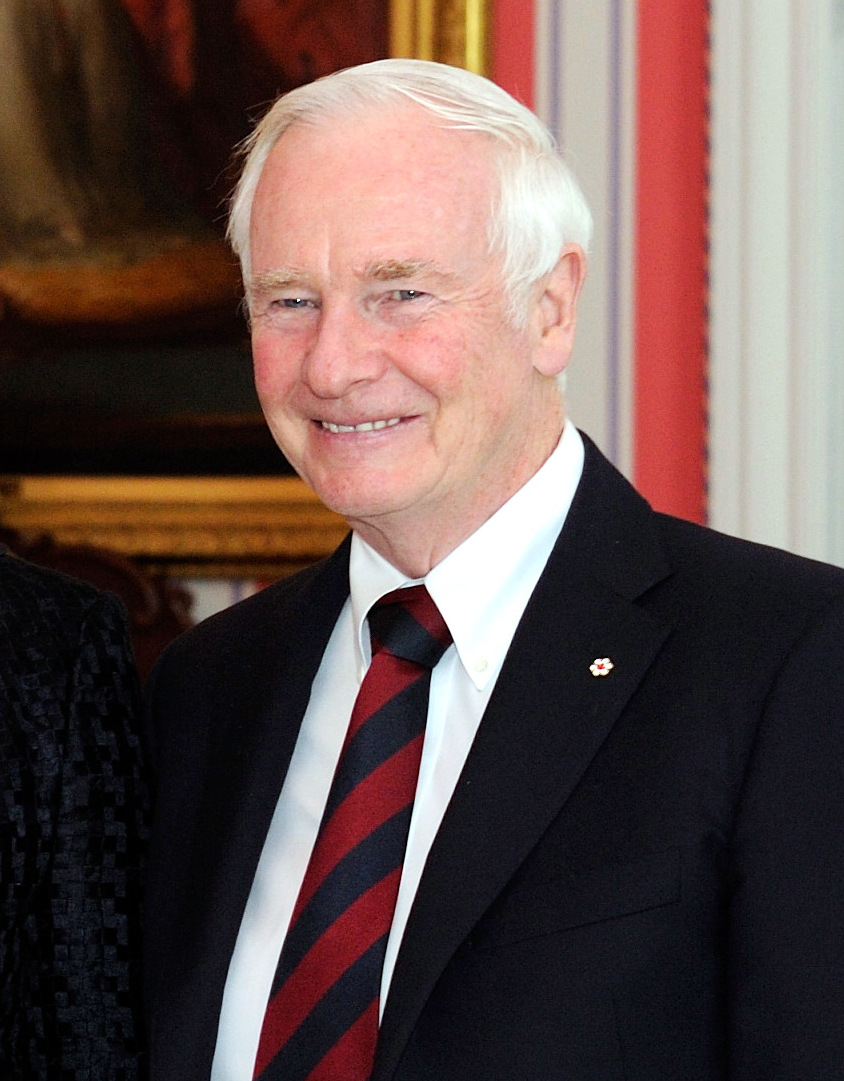
David Johnston, 28th Governor General of Canada

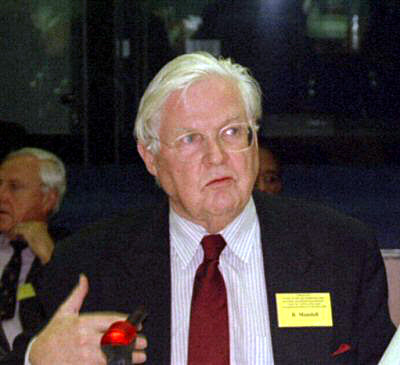
Robert Mundell, Nobel laureate in economics

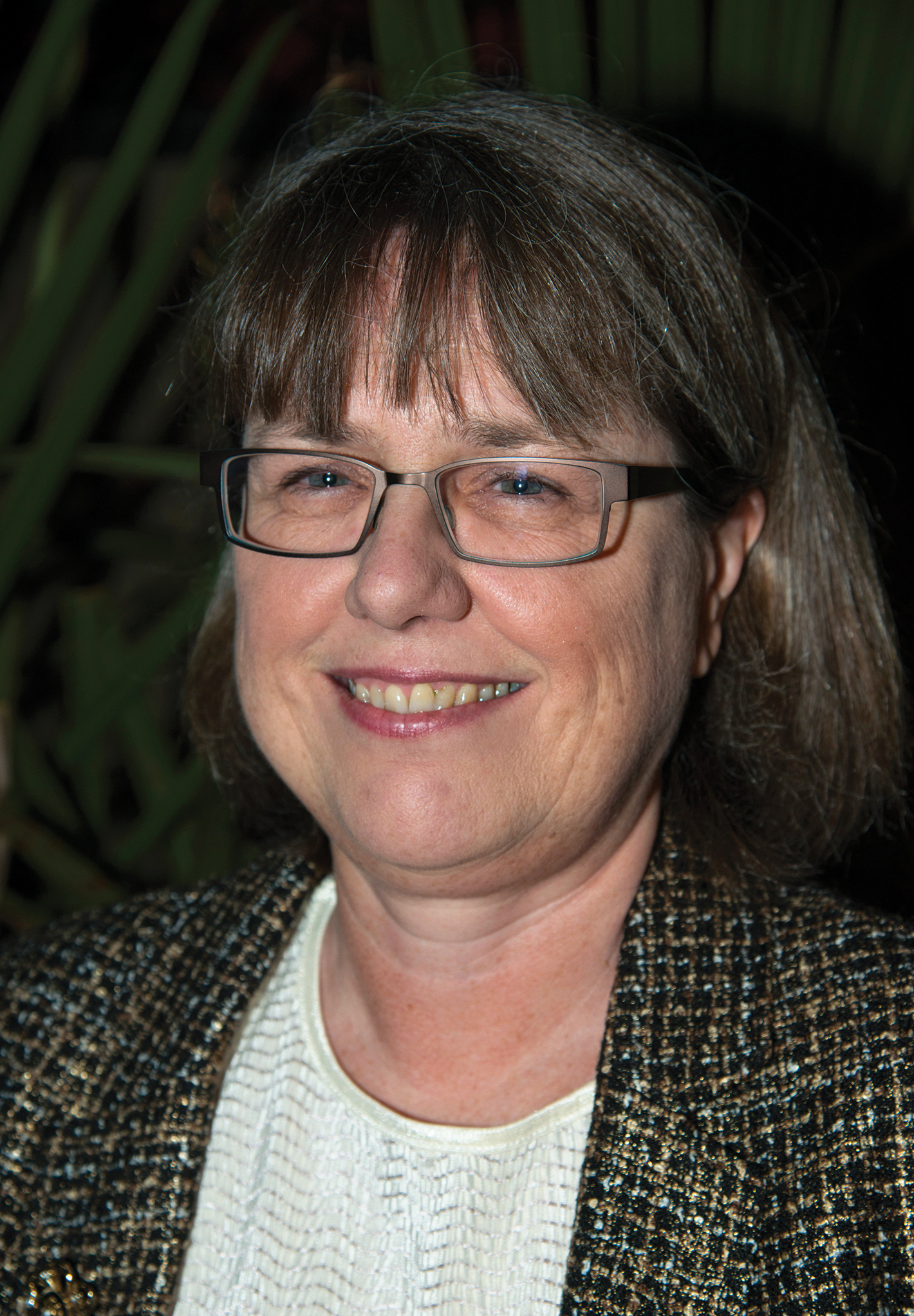
Donna Strickland, Nobel laureate in physics

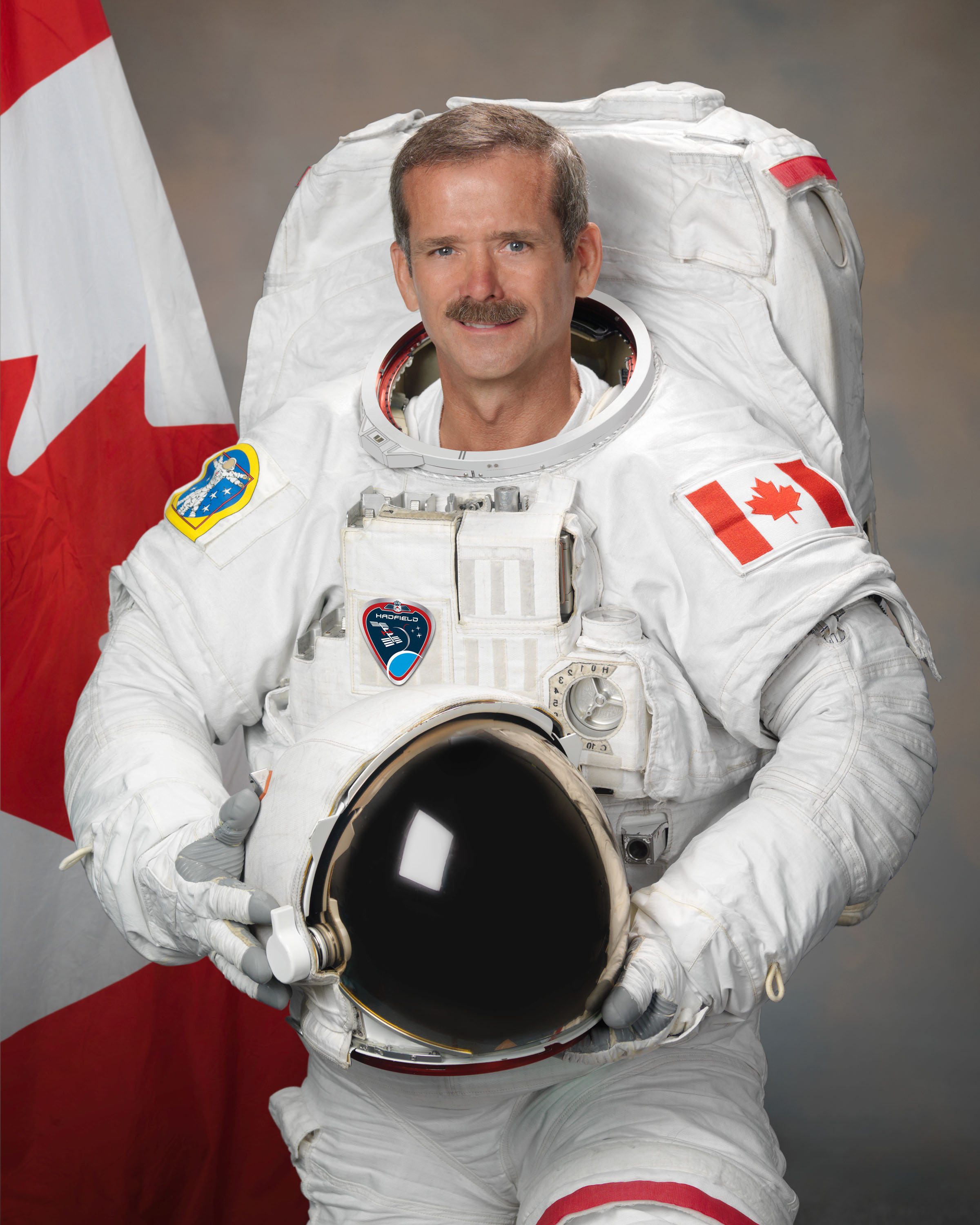
Chris Hadfield, retired Canadian astronaut.

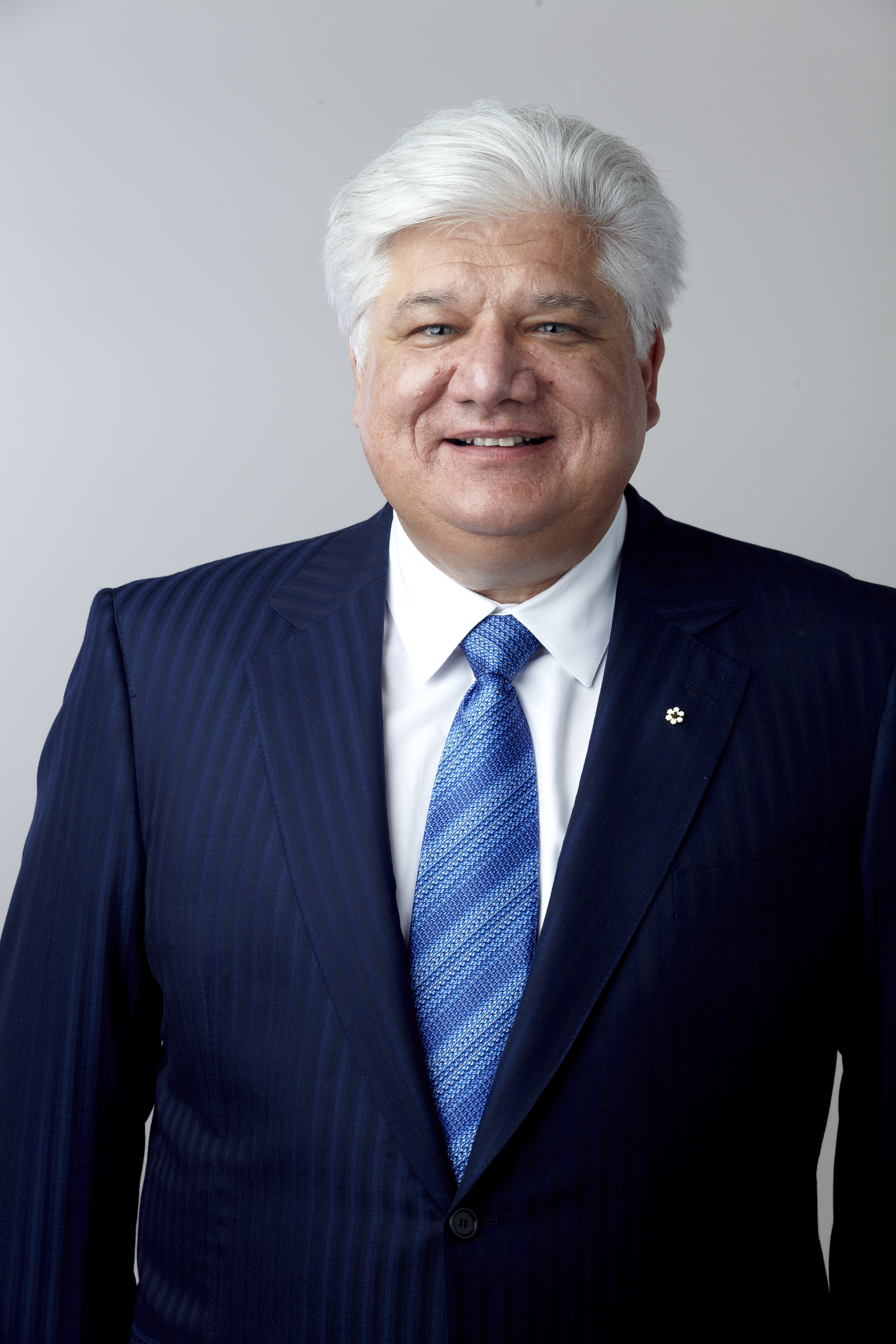
Mike Lazaridis, founder of BlackBerry Limited.

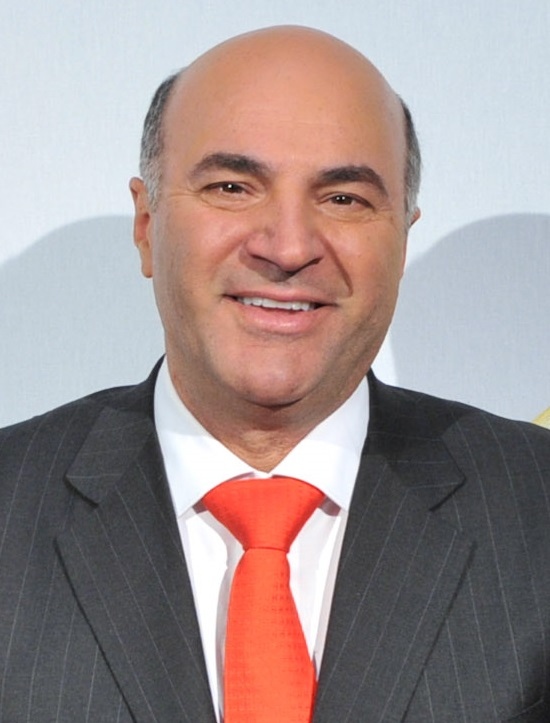
Kevin O'Leary, Canadian businessman, author, politician, and television personality.

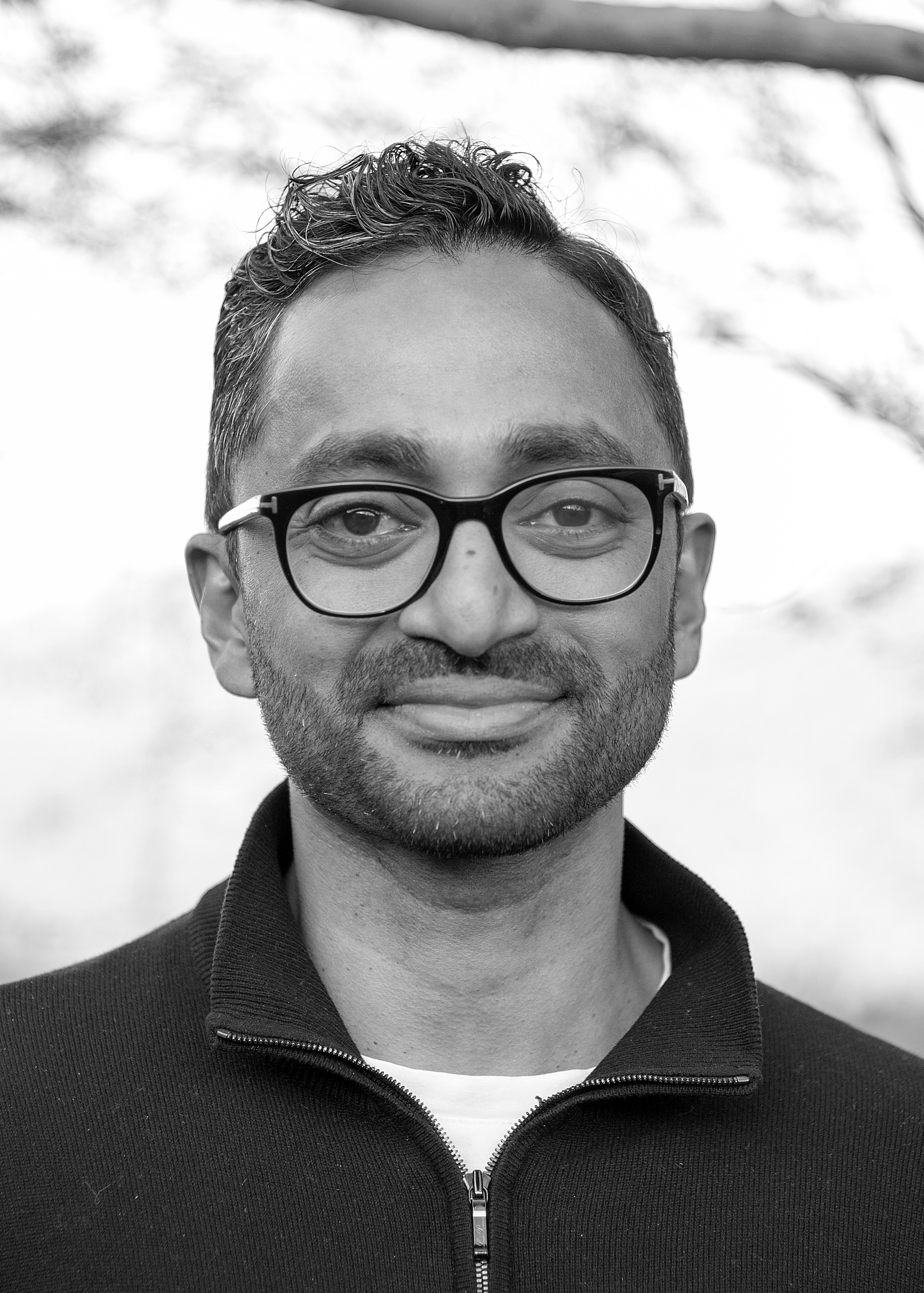
Chamath Palihapitiya, CEO of Social Capital and minority owner of the Golden State Warriors.

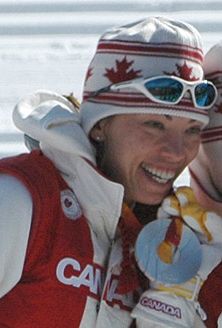
Beckie Scott, Olympic gold medalist in cross-country skiing.

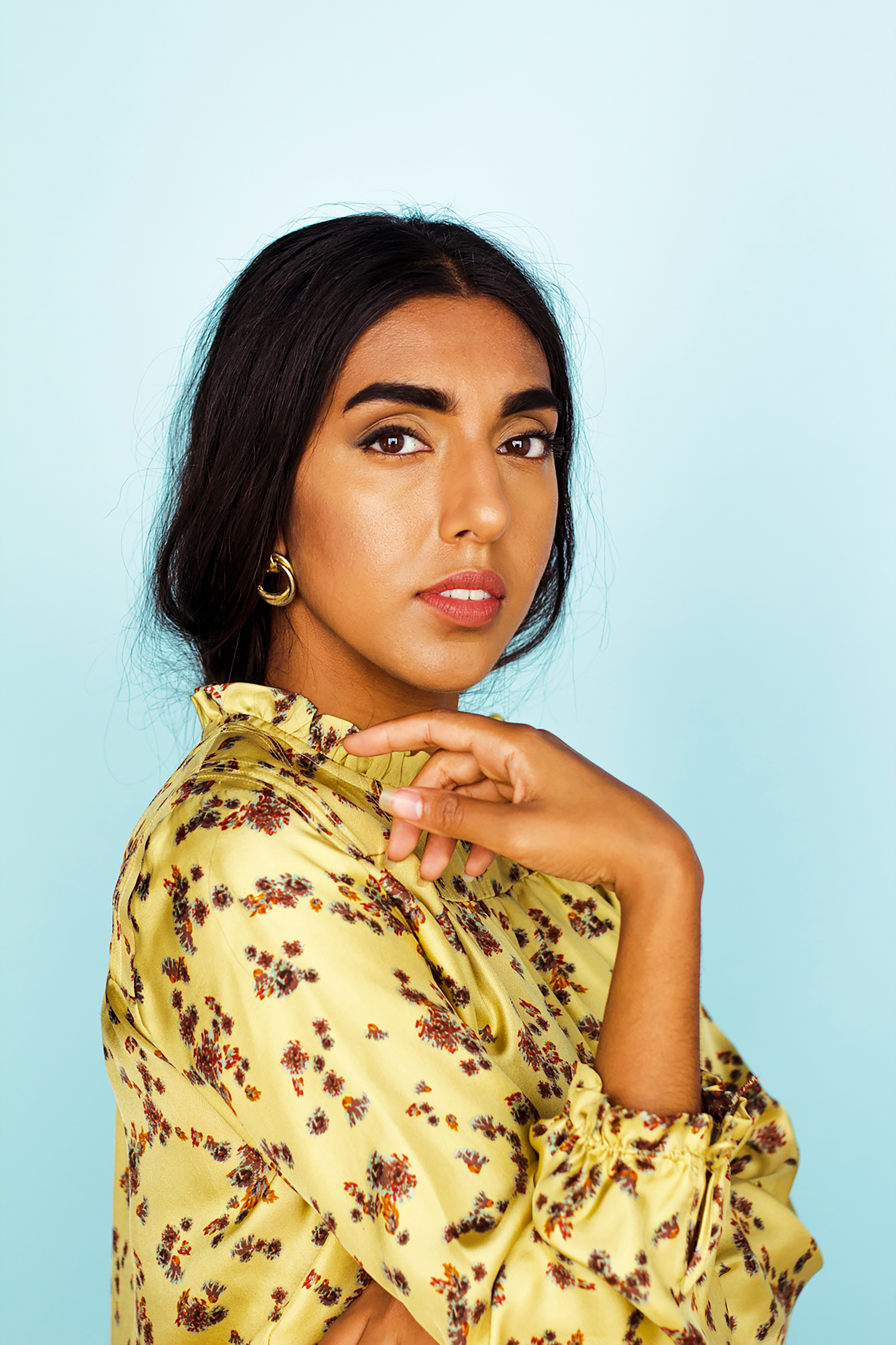
Rupi Kaur, popular Canadian poet and author of Milk and Honey.

Over 221,000 people have graduated from the university, and now reside in over 150 countries. Waterloo graduates have accumulated a number of awards, such as George Elliott Clarke, recipient of the Governor General's Award; William Reeves, recipient of an Academy Award, and a number of Rhodes Scholarships. Two members of the university have received the Nobel Prize. In 1999, Robert Mundell was awarded the Nobel Memorial Prize in Economic Sciences for his work in monetary dynamics and optimum currency areas. In 2018, university faculty member Donna Strickland was awarded the Nobel Prize in Physics for her work in laser physics. Other notable awards and positions bestowed on people affiliated with the university includes two Canada Excellence Research Chair laureates, five Killam Prize winners, 74 Canada Research Chairs, and 83 Fellows to the Royal Society of Canada.

A number of business leaders have worked or studied at Waterloo. Examples include David I. McKay, president and CEO of the Royal Bank of Canada, Kevin O’Leary, founder of SoftKey, John Baker, founder of Desire2Learn, David Cheriton, co-founder and chief scientist of Arista Networks, Mike Lazaridis, co-founder and former co-CEO of Research in Motion (now BlackBerry Ltd), Prem Watsa, chairman of Fairfax Financial and a former chancellor of the university, Steven Woods, co-founder of NeoEdge Networks and Quack.com and co-founders of Waterloo Maple, Keith Geddes and Gaston Gonnet. Gonnet was also the co-founder of OpenText Corporation. Several faculty members and students have also gained local and national prominence in government. David Johnston, the former president of Waterloo, served as the 28th Governor General of Canada from 2010 to 2017.

A number of the university's faculty and students have also gained prominence in the field of computing sciences. Examples include QNX operating systems co-creators Gordon Bell and Dan Dodge, Rasmus Lerdorf, the creator of the PHP scripting language, Matei Zaharia, the creator of Apache Spark, Gordon Cormack, the co-creator of the Dynamic Markov compression algorithm, Ric Holt, co-creator of several programming languages, most notably Turing, Jack Edmonds, a computer scientist, and developer of the Blossom algorithm, and the Edmonds' algorithm, Vitalik Buterin, the founder of Ethereum, and William Thomas Tutte, a World War II codebreaker who cracked the Nazi high command's Lorenz Cypher.

Graduates from the university have also risen to prominence in other fields. Heather Moyse, a graduate from the kinesiology program, is a prominent Canadian athlete and two-time Olympic bobsleigh gold medalist. Moyse has represented Canada in international bobsleigh, rugby and track cycling competitions. Graduate of the Rhetoric and Professional Writing program, Rupi Kaur is a Canadian poet, writer, illustrator. Her book of poetry, Milk and Honey, has spent over a year on The New York Times' bestsellers list, reaching No. 1 in January 2017. George Elliott Clarke, who served as the Poet Laureate of Toronto from 2012 to 2015 and as the 2016–2017 Canadian Parliamentary Poet Laureate, graduated with an English degree.

On 2 October 2018, Donna Strickland, an associate professor at the Physics and Astronomy Department, was awarded the Nobel Prize in physics. Strickland is the third woman to have ever been awarded the prize in physics. This was the first Nobel prize for a member of the university's faculty. Strickland was honoured for being half of the team to discover chirped pulse amplification, a technique that underpins today's short-pulse, high-intensity lasers. Scientific American explained the practical aspects of the invention as it applies in the most noteworthy application: it allows for "ultrabrief, ultrasharp beams can be used to make extremely precise cuts, so their technique is now used in laser machining and enables doctors to perform millions of corrective" laser eye surgeries.

== See also ==
- J. W. Graham Medal
- Midnight Sun Solar Race Team
- University of Waterloo Nano Robotics Group
- Waterloo Global Science Initiative
