= Varin =

Varin may refer to:

== People ==
- Charles Varin (1798–1869), French playwright
- Jean-Baptiste Varin (1810–1899), Canadian politician
- Jean Varin (1604–1672), French sculptor and engraver
- Quentin Varin (circa 1570–1634), French painter
- Robert A. Varin (born 1946), Polish-Canadian materials scientist and mechanical engineer

== Places ==
=== Canada ===
- Zec Varin, a controlled harvesting zone in Quebec, Canada

=== Cambodia ===
- Varin District, a district of Siem Reap Province, Cambodia

=== France ===
- Battenans-Varin, a commune located in the Department of Doubs

=== Iran ===
- Fileh Varin, a village in Qazvin, Iran
- Varin-e Bala, a village in Markazi Province, Iran
- Varin-e Pain, a village in Markazi Province, Iran

=== Russia ===
- Novy Varin, a village in Bryansk Oblast, Russia

=== Slovakia ===
- Varín, a village and municipality in Žilina District, Slovakia
