= Hammam (disambiguation) =

A hammam, called a Moorish bath (in reference to the Muslim Spain of Al-Andalus) and a Turkish bath by Westerners, is a type of steam bath or place of public bathing associated with the Islamic world.

Hamam (Arabic: حمام; also transliterated as Hmam, Hāmam and Hammam, with different meanings) may refer to:

== People ==
- Adem Hmam (born 1995), Tunisian table tennis player
- Sam Hammam (born 1948), Lebanese businessman and football club owner
- Wissem Hmam (born 1981), Tunisian basketball
- Abood Hamam (born 1975), Syrian photographer

== Places ==
- Hamaam, Israel
- Hamam, Kumlu, Hatay Province, Turkey
- Hamamköy, or Hamam, Mersin Province, Turkey
- Hammam, East Azerbaijan, Iran
- Hammam, Khuzestan, Iran
- Yekeh Chah, or Hammam, Markazi Province, Iran

== Other uses ==
- Hamam (soap), a brand of soap in India
- Hamam (film), a 1997 Italian-Turkish-Spanish film
