= Sos Kondar =

Sos Kondar سسكندر
- Village
- Location within Iran
- Coordinates: 33°56′19″N 50°30′53″E
- Country: Iran
- Province: Markazi
- County: Mahallat
- Bakhsh: Central
- Rural District: Baqerabad

Population (2006)
  - Total: 51
- Time zone: UTC+3:30 (IRST)
  - Summer (DST): UTC+4:30 (IRDT)

Sos Kondar (Persian: سسكندر, also Romanized as Seskandar and Seskondar; also known as Sekandar, Sekander, and Suskandūr) is a village in Baqerabad Rural District, in the Central District of Mahallat County, Markazi Province, Iran. At the 2006 census, its population was 51, in 19 families.
