= Aliabad-e Sanjeh Bashi =

Aliabad-e Sanjeh Bashi علي ابادسنجه باشي
- Village
- Location within Iran
- Coordinates: 33°52′43″N 50°21′41″E
- Country: Iran
- Province: Markazi
- County: Mahallat
- Bakhsh: Central
- Rural District: Baqerabad

Population (2006)
  - Total: 25
- Time zone: UTC+3:30 (IRST)
  - Summer (DST): UTC+4:30 (IRDT)

Aliabad-e Sanjeh Bashi (Persian: علي ابادسنجه باشي, also Romanized as ‘Alīābād-e Sanjeh Bāshī; also known as ‘Alīābād-e Sanjeh Vāsheh) is a village in Baqerabad Rural District, in the Central District of Mahallat County, Markazi Province, Iran. At the 2006 census, its population was 25, in 6 families.
