= Ateshkuh =

Ateshkuh اتشكوه
- Village
- Location within Iran
- Coordinates: 33°52′28″N 50°38′05″E
- Country: Iran
- Province: Markazi
- County: Mahallat
- Bakhsh: Central
- Rural District: Baqerabad

Population (2006)
  - Total: 23
- Time zone: UTC+3:30 (IRST)
  - Summer (DST): UTC+4:30 (IRDT)

Ateshkuh (Persian: اتشكوه, also Romanized as Āteshkūh, Ātash Kūh, and Ateshkooh; also known as Ātish Kūh) is a village in Markazi Province, in central Iran. The village is located in Baqerabad Rural District, in the Central District of Mahallat County. At the 2006 census, the village population consisted of 23 residents, in 8 families.
