= Nakhjirvan =

Village in Markazi province, Iran

Nakhjirvan Persian: نخجيروان
- Village
- Location within Iran
- Coordinates: 33°56′08″N 50°35′35″E
- Country: Iran
- Province: Markazi
- County: Mahallat
- District: Central
- Rural District: Baqerabad

Population (2016)
  - Total: 848
- Time zone: UTC+3:30 (IRST)

Nakhjirvan (Persian: نخجيروان) (Note: Also romanized as Nakhjīrevān and Nakhjīrvān; also known as Nazīrwān) is a village in, and the capital of, Baqerabad Rural District in the Central District of Mahallat County, Markazi province, Iran. The previous capital of the rural district was the village of Baqerabad, now a neighborhood in the village of Nimvar.

== Demographics ==
=== Population ===
At the time of the 2006 National Census, the village's population was 842 in 240 households. The following census in 2011 counted 964 people in 300 households. The 2016 census measured the population of the village as 848 people in 276 households, the most populous in its rural district.
