= Amirabad-e Bezanjan =

Amirabad-e Bezanjan اميراباد بزنجان
- Village
- Location within Iran
- Coordinates: 33°51′34″N 50°29′58″E
- Country: Iran
- Province: Markazi
- County: Mahallat
- Bakhsh: Central
- Rural District: Baqerabad

Population (2006)
  - Total: 72
- Time zone: UTC+3:30 (IRST)
  - Summer (DST): UTC+4:30 (IRDT)

Amirabad-e Bezanjan (Persian: اميراباد بزنجان, also Romanized as Amīrābād-e Bezanjān; also known as Amīrābād-e Arazī) is a village in Baqerabad Rural District, in the Central District of Mahallat County, Markazi Province, Iran. At the 2006 census, its population was 72, in 21 families.
