= Mozvar =

Mozvar مزور
- Village
- Location within Iran
- Coordinates: 33°56′07″N 50°36′24″E
- Country: Iran
- Province: Markazi
- County: Mahallat
- Bakhsh: Central
- Rural District: Baqerabad

Population (2006)
  - Total: 73
- Time zone: UTC+3:30 (IRST)
  - Summer (DST): UTC+4:30 (IRDT)

Mozvar (Persian: مزور, also Romanized as Mozaver, Mazūr, and Mazvar; also known as Majwār) is a village in Baqerabad Rural District, in the Central District of Mahallat County, Markazi Province, Iran. At the 2006 census, its population was 73, in 26 families.
