= Ab Garm-e Bala =

Ab Garm-e Bala اب گرم بالا
- Village
- Location within Iran
- Coordinates: 34°00′23″N 50°32′52″E
- Country: Iran
- Province: Markazi
- County: Mahallat
- Bakhsh: Central
- Rural District: Baqerabad

Population (2006)
  - Total: 11
- Time zone: UTC+3:30 (IRST)
  - Summer (DST): UTC+4:30 (IRDT)

Ab Garm-e Bala (Persian: اب گرم بالا, also Romanized as Āb Garm-e Bālā; also known as Āb-e Garm, Ābgarm, and Āb-i-Garm) is a village in Baqerabad Rural District, in the Central District of Mahallat County, Markazi Province, Iran. At the 2006 census, its population was 11, in 8 families.
