= Abbasabad, Mahallat =

Abbasabad عباس اباد
- Village
- Location within Iran
- Coordinates: 33°52′12″N 50°32′07″E
- Country: Iran
- Province: Markazi
- County: Mahallat
- Bakhsh: Central
- Rural District: Baqerabad

Population (2006)
  - Total: 30
- Time zone: UTC+3:30 (IRST)
  - Summer (DST): UTC+4:30 (IRDT)

Abbasabad (Persian: عباس اباد, also Romanized as ‘Abbāsābād) is a village in Baqerabad Rural District, in the Central District of Mahallat County, Markazi Province, Iran. At the 2006 census, its population was 30, in 6 families.
