= Nosratabad, Mahallat =

Nosratabad نصرت اباد
- Village
- Location within Iran
- Coordinates: 33°51′53″N 50°28′20″E
- Country: Iran
- Province: Markazi
- County: Mahallat
- Bakhsh: Central
- Rural District: Baqerabad

Population (2006)
  - Total: 17
- Time zone: UTC+3:30 (IRST)
  - Summer (DST): UTC+4:30 (IRDT)

Nosratabad (Persian: نصرت اباد, also Romanized as Noşratābād) is a village in Baqerabad Rural District, in the Central District of Mahallat County, Markazi Province, Iran. At the 2006 census, its population was 17, in 4 families.
