= Amirabad, Mahallat =

Village in Markazi province, Iran

Amirabad Persian: اميراباد
- Village
- Location within Iran
- Coordinates: 33°53′41″N 50°12′45″E
- Country: Iran
- Province: Markazi
- County: Mahallat
- District: Central
- Rural District: Baqerabad

Population (2016)
  - Total: 107
- Time zone: UTC+3:30 (IRST)

Amirabad (Persian: اميراباد) (Note: Also romanized as Amīrābād) is a village in Baqerabad Rural District of the Central District in Mahallat County, Markazi province, Iran.

== Demographics ==
=== Population ===
At the time of the 2006 National Census, the village's population was 86 in 27 households. The following census in 2011 counted 87 people in 28 households. The 2016 census measured the population of the village as 107 people in 37 households.
