= Baqerabad, Mahallat =

Neighborhood in Markazi province, Iran

Baqerabad Persian: باقراباد
- Neighborhood
- Location within Iran
- Coordinates: 33°52′50″N 50°32′21″E
- Country: Iran
- Province: Markazi
- County: Mahallat
- District: Central
- City: Nimvar

Population (2011)
  - Total: 1,403
- Time zone: UTC+3:30 (IRST)

Baqerabad (Persian: باقراباد) (Note: Also romanized as Bāqerābād; also known as Bagher Abad and Bāqirābād) is a neighborhood in the city of Nimvar in the Central District of Mahallat County, Markazi province, Iran. As a village, it was the capital of Baqerabad Rural District until its capital was transferred to the village of Nakhjirvan.

== Demographics ==
=== Population ===
At the time of the 2006 National Census, Baqerabad's population was 1,366 in 386 households, when it was a village in Baqerabad Rural District. The following census in 2011 counted 1,403 people in 437 households. After the census, Baqerabad was annexed by the city of Nimvar.
