= Golcheshmeh-ye Bala =

Village in Markazi province, Iran

Golcheshmeh-ye Bala Persian: گل چشمه بالا
- Village
- Location within Iran
- Coordinates: 33°43′31″N 50°37′30″E
- Country: Iran
- Province: Markazi
- County: Mahallat
- District: Central
- Rural District: Baqerabad

Population (2016)
  - Total: 143
- Time zone: UTC+3:30 (IRST)

Golcheshmeh-ye Bala (Persian: گل چشمه بالا) (Note: Also romanized as Golcheshmeh-ye Bālā; also known as Gol Chashmeh, Golcheshmeh, and Gulchashmeh) is a village in Baqerabad Rural District of the Central District in Mahallat County, Markazi province, Iran.

== Demographics ==
=== Population ===
At the time of the 2006 National Census, the village's population was 179 in 61 households. The following census in 2011 counted 126 people in 52 households. The 2016 census measured the population of the village as 143 people in 56 households.
