= Isaabad, Markazi =

Village in Markazi province, Iran

Isaabad Persian: عيسي اباد
- Village
- Location within Iran
- Coordinates: 34°01′23″N 50°18′15″E
- Country: Iran
- Province: Markazi
- County: Mahallat
- District: Central
- Rural District: Khurheh

Population (2016)
  - Total: 121
- Time zone: UTC+3:30 (IRST)

Isaabad (Persian: عيسي اباد) (Note: Also romanized as ‘Īsáābād; also known as Īsābād) is a village in Khurheh Rural District of the Central District in Mahallat County, Markazi province, Iran.

== Demographics ==
=== Population ===
At the time of the 2006 National Census, the village's population was 194 in 53 households. The following census in 2011 counted 138 people in 50 households. The 2016 census measured the population of the village as 121 people in 51 households.
