= Falaver =

Falaver (Persian: فلاور) may refer to:

- Falaver-e Bala
- Falaver-e Pain
