= Mohammadabad, Mahallat =

Village in Markazi province, Iran

Mohammadabad Persian: محمداباد
- Village
- Location within Iran
- Coordinates: 33°56′27″N 50°37′00″E
- Country: Iran
- Province: Markazi
- County: Mahallat
- District: Central
- Rural District: Baqerabad

Population (2016)
  - Total: 175
- Time zone: UTC+3:30 (IRST)

Mohammadabad (Persian: محمداباد) (Note: Also romanized as Moḩammadābād; also known as Moḩammadābād Arāẕī) is a village in Baqerabad Rural District of the Central District in Mahallat County, Markazi province, Iran.

== Demographics ==
=== Population ===
At the time of the 2006 National Census, the village's population was 203 in 49 households. The following census in 2011 counted 189 people in 56 households. The 2016 census measured the population of the village as 175 people in 58 households.
