= University of Waterloo Faculty of Engineering =

Engineering school of the University of Waterloo, Canada

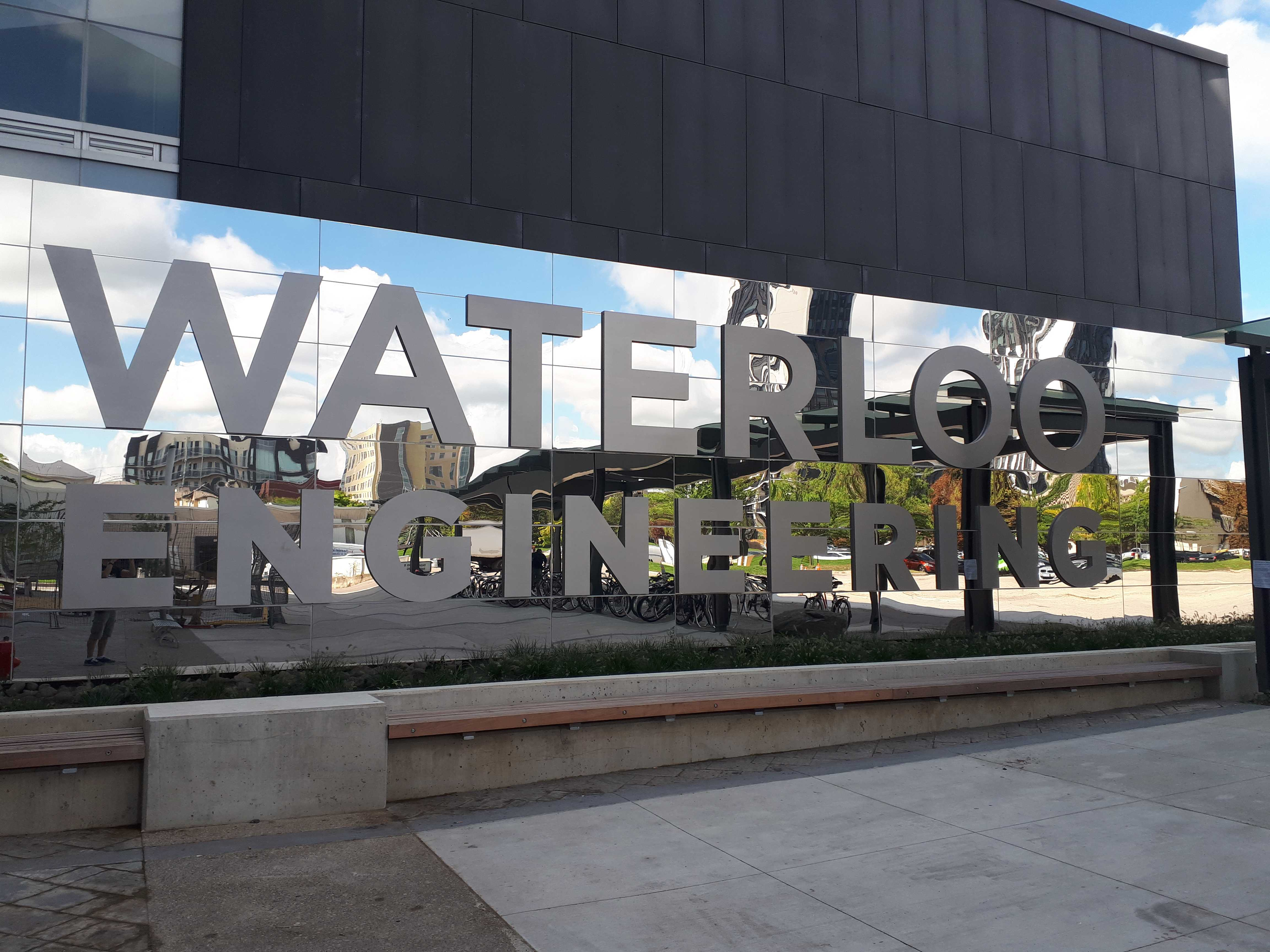
- Type: Public engineering school
- Established: 1957; 69 years ago
- Parent institution: University of Waterloo
- Dean: Mary Wells
- Academic staff: 309
- Undergraduates: 7630
- Postgraduates: 1872
- Location: Waterloo, Ontario, Canada; 43°28′16″N 80°32′21″W
- Symbol: Wrench (The TOOL)
- Colours: Purple
- Website: uwaterloo.ca/engineering/

The University of Waterloo Faculty of Engineering is the engineering school of the University of Waterloo in Waterloo, Ontario, Canada. Of the six faculties at the university, it has 8,698 undergraduate students, 2176 graduate students, 334 faculty and 52,750 alumni making it the largest engineering school in Canada with external research funding from 195 Canadian and international partners exceeding $86.8 million. Ranked among the top 50 engineering schools in the world, the faculty of engineering houses eight academic units (two schools, six departments) and offers 15 bachelor's degree programs in a variety of disciplines.

All undergraduate students are automatically enrolled in the co-operative education program, in which they alternate between academic and work terms throughout their five years of undergraduate study. There are 7,600 co-op positions arranged for students annually.

== History ==
The faculty of engineering was originally conceived in 1957 as an extension of the then Waterloo College (now known as Wilfrid Laurier University). It was the college's first Faculty, originally named the Faculty of Science and Engineering of the Waterloo College Associate Faculties. The first class consisted of 74 male engineering students. In October 1957, the students started their work terms in what was the first co-operative education program in Canada. These students alternated between being in school and working in industry every three months. The program was later changed to a four-month term system, and has been adopted by all of the other University's Faculties in their co-op programs.

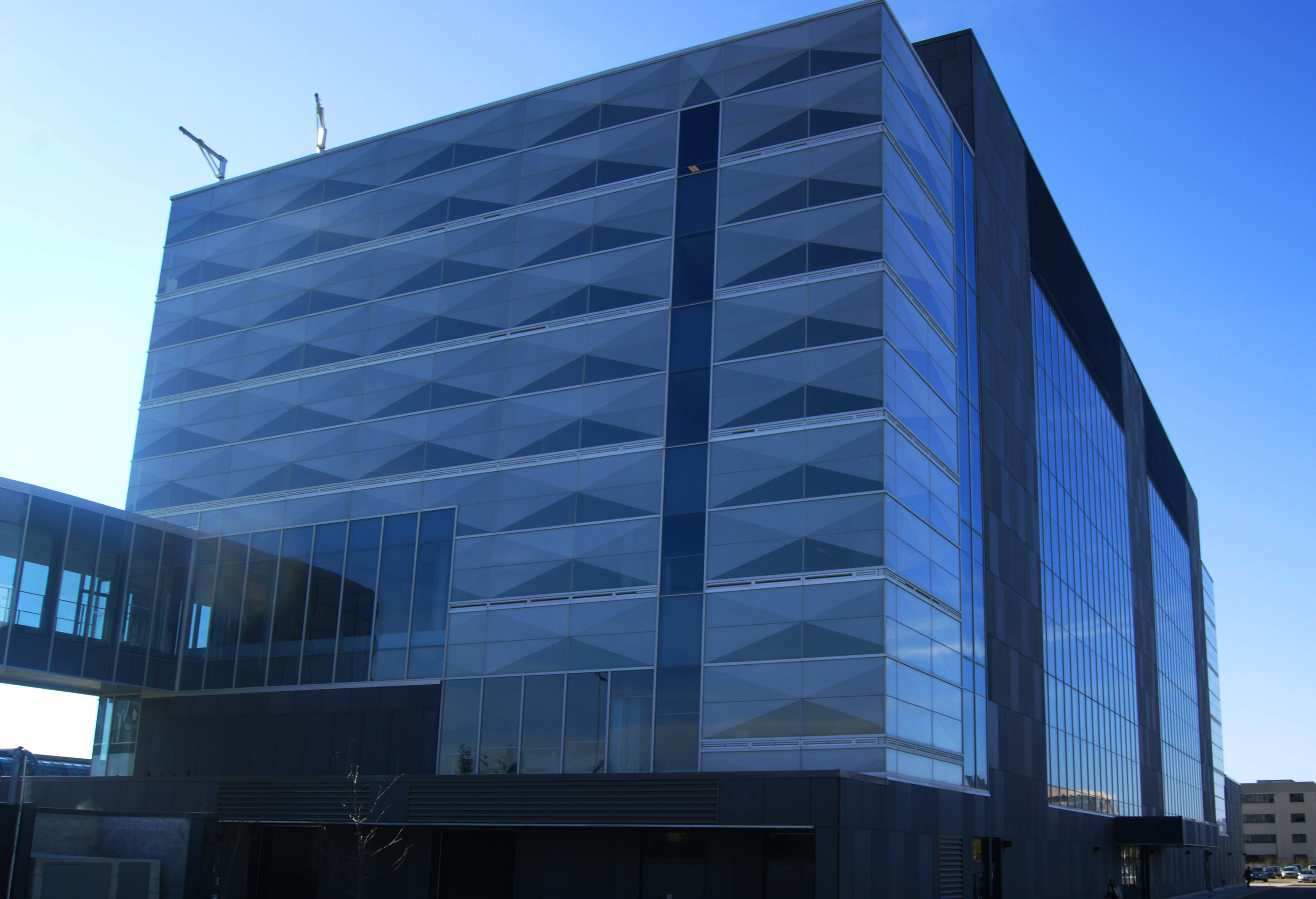
A view of the right/rear side of the Engineering 5 building.

In 1959, the "associate faculties" of Waterloo College separated and became the University of Waterloo and the former faculty of science and engineering was renamed the faculty of engineering.

On Saturday, May 27, 1961, the faculty's first engineering graduates were awarded the Master of Applied Science in electrical engineering. William Cousins Miller, John Shewchun, Ferenc Takacs, and William Jacob Vetter received their degrees from Professor R. G. Stanton, chairman, faculty of graduate studies.

In July 2012, Pearl Sullivan became the first woman to hold the position of dean at the University of Waterloo Engineering. She was one of five women across Canada to head a school of engineering. She held the position until November 2019.

In 2020, Mary Wells was appointed the dean of engineering. She was previously a professor in the faculty's department of mechanical and mechatronics engineering for 10 years.

In 2021, University of Waterloo's faculties of engineering and math partnered with five Ontario faculties of engineering to create the IBET PhD Project, to foster equitable and inclusive research environments to increase the presence of Indigenous and Black academics in STEM. The program has expanded to include 18 academic institutions across Canada and includes IBET Momentum fellowships and academic mentoring to help increase the number of Indigenous and Black academics at Canadian post-secondary institutions. The faculty hosted its inaugural conference for the fellowship program on October 23 and 24, 2022.

On November 10, 2022, the engineering faculty's IDEAS Clinic was renamed the Pearl Sullivan IDEAS Clinic in honour of the Faculty's former Dean, who died from cancer in 2020.

Waterloo Engineering has one of the highest percentages of women in undergraduate programs in Canada. The faculty has a Women in Engineering (WiE) group that was established in 1992 to support women and non-binary engineering students and alumni. It also has an on-campus residence living learning community for women in the faculty of engineering that is located at the University of Waterloo's United College.

== Undergraduate programs ==
There are 15 undergraduate programs offered by the Faculty: Architectural, Biomedical, Chemical, Civil, Computer, Electrical, Environmental, Geological, Management, Mechanical, Mechatronics, Nanotechnology, Software and Systems Design Engineering as well as Architecture. Within the engineering programs, there are options that can be taken in the later years of undergraduate studies. Options include mechanical, computer, electrical, or control systems for the Mechatronics Engineering program.

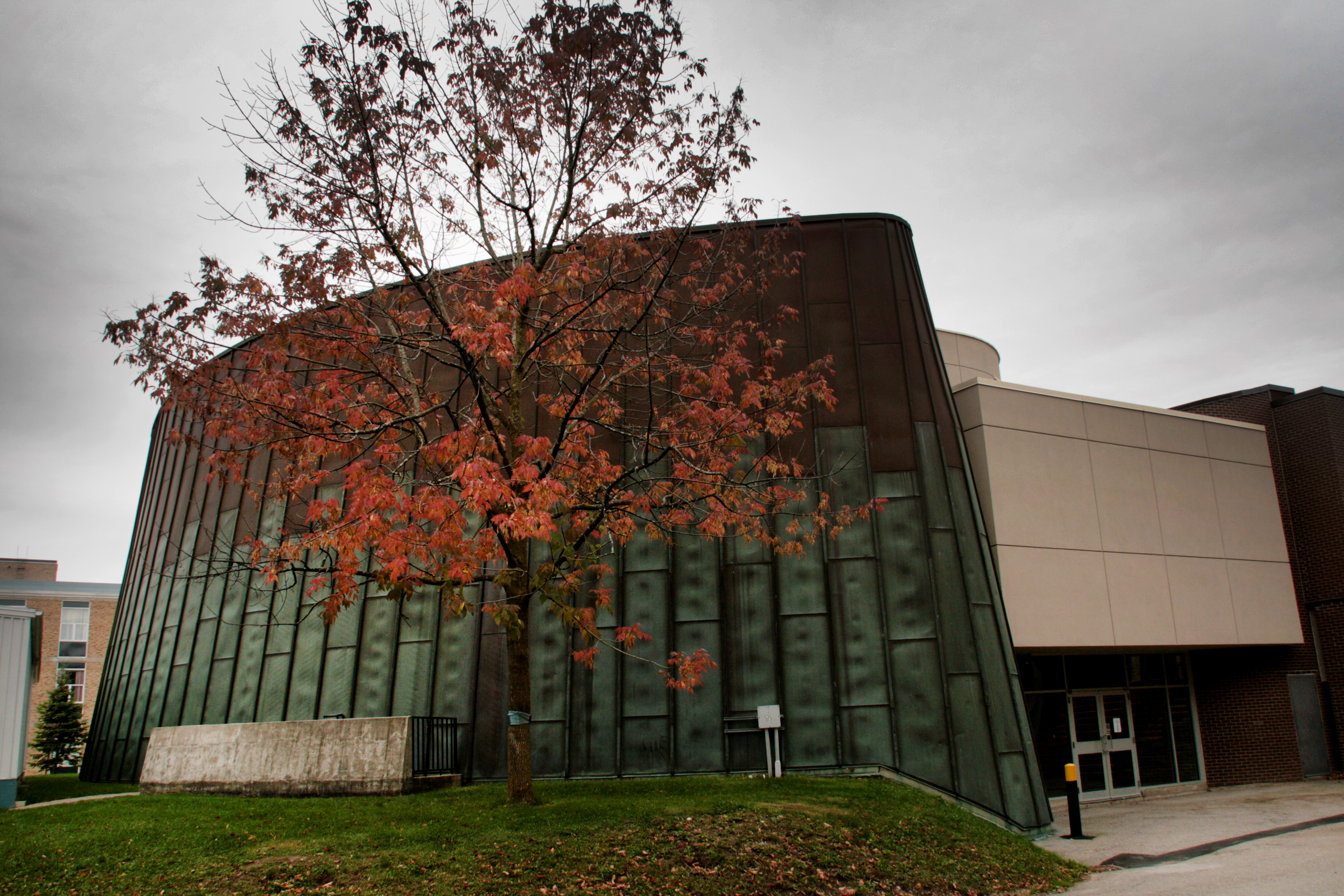
Engineering Lecture Hall at the University of Waterloo.

Each of Waterloo Engineering's eight academic units (schools and departments) also offers graduate degrees.

=== Architectural engineering ===
Architectural engineering is the newest undergraduate program, introduced in September 2018. It was designed to produce engineers technically skilled in the whole scope of building design, construction, assessment, repair and refurbishment with an emphasis on communication, collaboration and design. There were 373 architectural engineering undergraduate students in fall 2021.

=== Architecture ===
The architecture program focuses on the culture and practice of design. Students learn the workings of society and culture, of the principles of physics, of materials and techniques of construction, of the human interaction with the natural and built environment, of historical process, of critical thought and the diverse forms of creative expression. There were 341 undergraduate architecture students in fall 2021.

=== Biomedical engineering ===
The biomedical engineering program is part of the Department of Systems Design Engineering. This interdisciplinary program which focuses on design, combining fields such as biochemistry, cellular physiology, anatomy, molecular biology, and physiology with engineering principles, centres around the creation and development of biomedical systems and devices. There were 414 biomedical engineering undergraduate students in fall 2021.

=== Chemical engineering ===
The chemical engineering program deals with the use and transformation of raw materials and energy. Students explore areas such as biotechnology, advanced materials, pollution control, alternative energy and other industry applications. There were 604 undergraduate chemical engineering students in fall 2021.

=== Civil engineering ===
The civil engineering program at University of Waterloo is administrated by the department of civil and environmental engineering. It prepares its graduates for work in fields that include traffic engineering, structural design, building structures, bridges, sanitation (public health), structures, harbours, aerospace, highways (roads and streets), railroads, pipelines, foundations, tunnelling (rock mechanics), surveying and cartography, urban and regional planning and overall project planning. There were 604 civil engineering undergraduate students in fall 2021.

=== Computer engineering ===
Students in the computer engineering program, learn about hardware, software, and computing principles in the context of important devices and systems – systems that control phones, cars, planes, and robots. They share classes with Electrical Engineering students until the second semester of the second year, with the Computer Engineering class required to take Embedded Microprocessor Systems and Systems Programming. There are 1451 computer engineering students, making it the faculty of engineering's largest undergraduate program.

=== Electrical engineering ===
Students in the electrical engineering program learn fundamental skills in electronics, circuit analysis and electromagnetics. They share classes with Computer Engineering students until the second semester of the second year, with Electrical Engineering students then required to take Advanced Calculus II, and Electrical Properties of Materials. In fall 2021, Electrical Engineering had 418 undergraduate students registered.

=== Environmental engineering ===
Environmental engineering is an accredited engineering program administrated by the department of civil and environmental engineering. The program focuses on water management and treatment, solid waste management, remediation of surface water and groundwater systems, biotechnology and contaminant transport. The program offers elective courses in earth sciences, biology, chemistry, ecology and planning. There were 273 undergraduate students enrolled in the program as of fall 2021.

=== Geological engineering ===
The geological engineering program is part of the department of civil and environmental engineering. More than half of the courses that geological engineering students take are offered through the faculty of science. In first year, geological engineering students take courses together with environmental and civil engineering students. In second year, they move into their own stream. There were 63 geological engineering undergraduate students in fall 2021.

=== Management engineering ===
The management engineering program at University of Waterloo is administrated by the department of Management Sciences. This program covers subjects such as mathematical optimization, stochastic modelling, process improvement and operations research. There were 440 management engineering undergraduate students in fall 2021.

=== Mechanical engineering ===
The mechanical engineering program at University of Waterloo is administrated by the department of mechanical & mechatronics engineering. The mechanical engineering program is one of the largest engineering programs at the University of Waterloo. Graduates have a foundation in mechanics, power, control, and manufacturing. There were 1006 mechanical engineering undergraduate students attending as of fall 2021.

=== Mechatronics Engineering ===
Mechatronics engineering, often referred to as "Tron", is administrated by the department of mechanical and mechatronics engineering and was launched at the University of Waterloo in 2003. Its first class graduated in 2008. Mechatronics engineering is a multidisciplinary field of study, combining computers with electro-mechanical technology in order to create robotic, wearable and autonomous systems. Though the program begins with students required to take a spectrum of mandatory courses, it later allows an extremely broad range of electives to enable specialization. Technical electives in fourth year include artificial intelligence, autonomous robotics, multi-sensing systems, computer architecture, micro electro mechanical systems, etc. Through these electives, students are able to strengthen skills within the mechanical, electrical, or computer aspect of Mechatronics. The department is currently chaired by Professor Michael Collins and has 1095 undergraduate students enrolled in total as of fall 2021.

=== Nanotechnology engineering ===
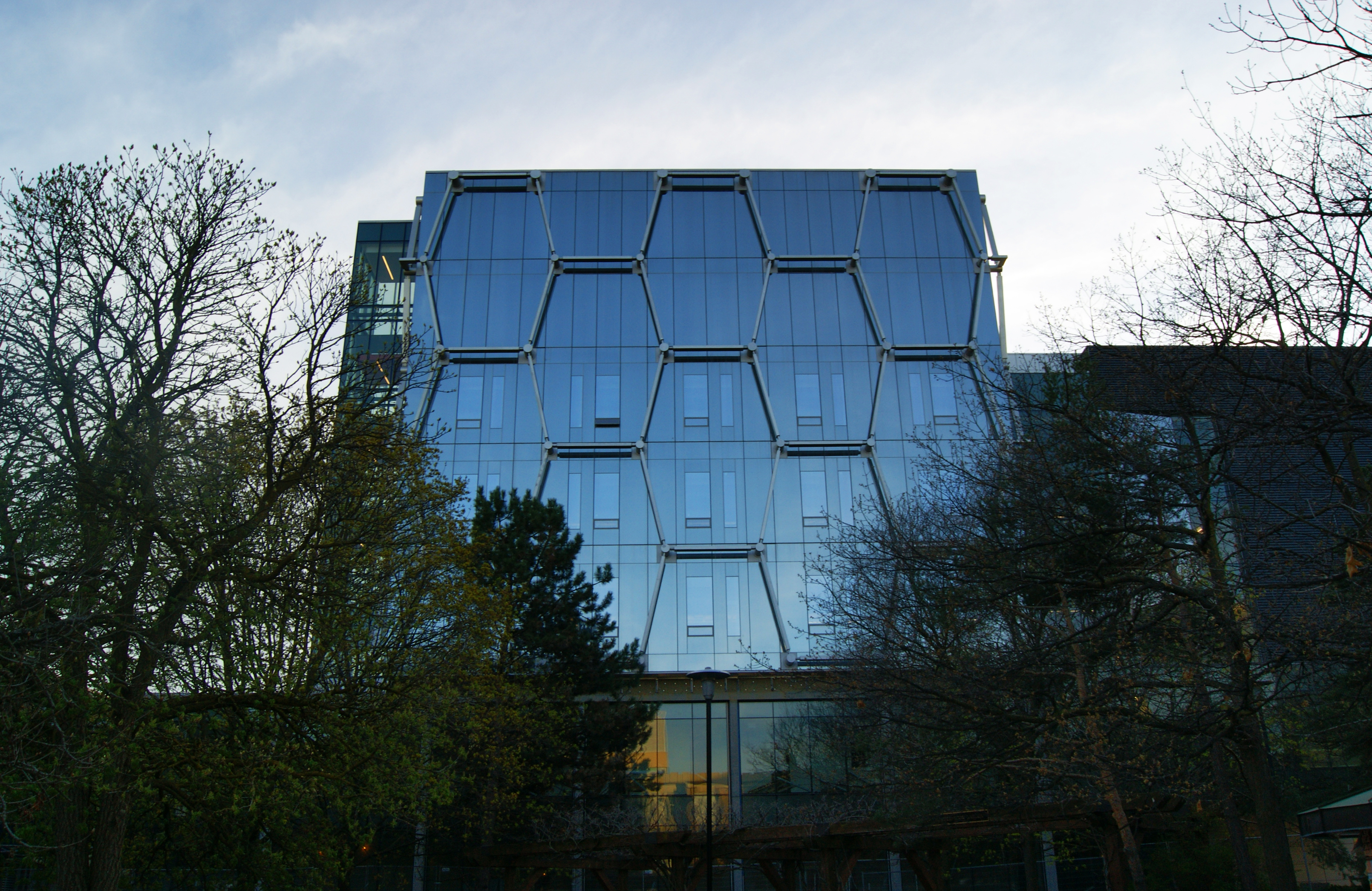
The Mike and Ophelia Lazaridis Quantum-Nano Centre

Nanotechnology engineering at the University of Waterloo is administrated by the department of chemical engineering as well as the department of electrical and computer engineering. Founded in 2005, it is Canada's first accredited undergraduate nanotechnology engineering program and the only program of its type in North America. Graduates work in many different fields such as nano-engineered materials, nano-electronics, nano-biosystems, and nano-instruments. Built in 2012, the $160-million, 285,000-square-foot Mike & Ophelia Lazaridis Quantum-Nano Centre, (also known as Quantum Nano Centre, or simply QNC), is home to this engineering program. The QNC is composed of two main buildings designated for the Waterloo Institute for Quantum Computing (IQC) and Waterloo Institute for Nanotechnology (WIN) and it includes classrooms for instructional teaching and laboratories for research and development. The facilities operate with control for vibration, humidity, electromagnetic radiation, and temperature. Cleanroom facilities are constructed upon a separate building foundation to keep vibrations at less than a micron. There were 509 nanotechnology engineering undergraduate students attending in fall 2021.

=== Software engineering ===
Software engineering at the University of Waterloo is an independent, interdisciplinary program supported by both the faculty of mathematics and the faculty of engineering. Graduates of this program earn a Bachelor of Software Engineering (BSE) degree. This program applies computer science and engineering principles and practices to the creation, operation, and maintenance of software systems. There were 615 software engineering undergraduate students enrolled as of fall 2021. In 2022, more than 70 percent of the class accepted job offers in the United States.

=== Systems design engineering ===
Systems design engineering at University of Waterloo is administered by the department of systems design engineering. Systems design is focused on creation or modification of systems including human physiological and psychological systems, ecological systems, transportation systems, communication systems, energy systems and mechatronic systems. The program had 515 undergraduate enrolled in it as of fall 2021.

== Graduate programs ==
There are 2176 graduate students at the University of Waterloo Faculty of Engineering. The school graduates the largest number of engineers at the graduate level in Canada.

University of Waterloo offers 37 graduate degree programs in architecture, chemical engineering, civil & environmental engineering, electrical & computer engineering, management sciences, mechanical & mechatronics engineering and system design. Graduate degrees are also offered by the Conrad School of Entrepreneurship and Business. Engineering.

The program with the largest graduate enrolment is electrical & computer engineering, with a total of 749 students.

The faculty offer research programs in architecture (Master of Architecture), applied science (Master of Applied Science) as well as a Doctor of Philosophy (PhD). In addition, there are Master of Engineering (MEng), Master of Management Sciences (MMSc) and Master of Business, Entrepreneurship and Technology (MBET) programs.

Funding is provided for graduate students with financial support available from a variety of sources. In spring 2018, the school began offering additional fellowships for Canadian and Permanent Resident students entering engineering research programs.

Major awards won by University of Waterloo Engineering graduate students totals over $2M. The Indigenous and Black Engineering and Technology (IBET) PhD project is a Fellowship that provides financial support of $30,000 per year for 4 years for University of Waterloo recipients.

University of Waterloo Faculty of Engineering maintains an intellectual property policy that gives both faculty and students complete ownership over their ideas and technology.

== Academic units ==
The faculty has six departments, one school, and one centre. They are the school of architecture, department of chemical engineering, department of civil and environmental engineering, department of electrical and computer engineering, department of management sciences, department of mechanical and mechatronics engineering, department of systems design engineering, and Centre for Business, Entrepreneurship and Technology (CBET). Architecture rejoined the faculty of engineering after leaving environmental studies in May 2005, while the Conrad School of Entrepreneurship and Business joined the faculty in June 2006, not having been previously affiliated to a faculty.

=== School of architecture ===
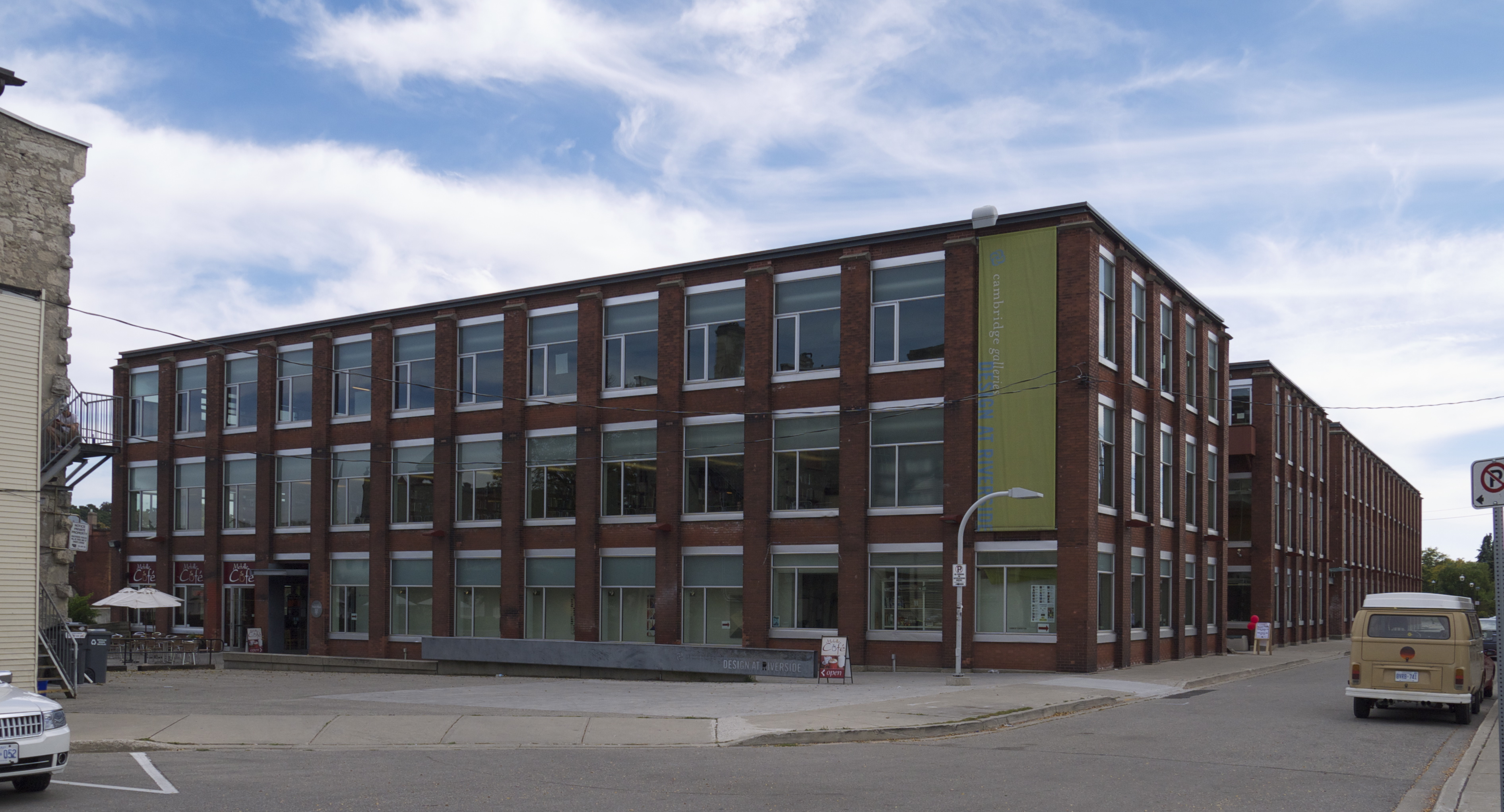
University of Waterloo School of Architecture

The school of architecture in the faculty of engineering at the University of Waterloo offers a Canadian Architectural Certification Board (CACB) accredited professional program consisting of a four-year Honours Bachelor of Architectural Studies followed by a Professional Master of Architecture. Located in Cambridge, Ontario, it offers a fully cooperative professional program and has been rated the greenest architecture curriculum in Canada. It is the only Canadian school of architecture to have a permanent international facility, which has operated in Rome, Italy since 1979. In fall 2021, there were 107 graduate students enrolled in the school of architecture.

=== Conrad School of Entrepreneurship & Business ===
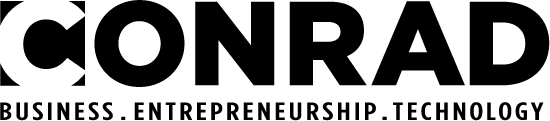

University of Waterloo Conrad School of Entrepreneurship and Business (The Conrad School) is part of the faculty of engineering and located in the Engineering 7 (E7) building. The school offers a Master of Business, Entrepreneurship and Technology (MBET) program; professional development programs; research; and undergraduate-level academic courses. MBET alumni include Noah Buchman - the founder of Propel Holdings, an online artificial intelligence fintech platform that provides loans to people with low credit ratings - and Rachel Bartholomew founder of Hyivy Health, the developers of a pelvic health rehabilitation system. In fall 2021, there were 91 graduate students enrolled at the Conrad School of Entrepreneurship and Business.

== Research Centres and Labs ==
University of Waterloo Engineering's research collaborations include partnerships with almost 800 Canadian companies and 300 international companies as well as many leading universities. In 2019/2020 external research funding from Canadian and international partners exceeded $86.8 million. There are 23 Research Chairs, 19 University Research and Endowed Chairs and 8 NSERC design chairs and industrial research chairs. And there are 57 Early Researcher Award recipients.

=== Research Centres ===
- Centre for Advanced Materials Joining
- Centre for Advancement of Trenchless Technologies
- Centre for Bioengineering and Biotechnology
- Centre for Control of Emerging Contaminants
- Centre for Intelligent Antenna and Radio Systems
- Centre for Pattern Analysis and Machine Intelligence
- Centre for Pavement and Transportation Technology
- Cybersecurity and Privacy Institute
- Games Institute
- Giga-to-Nano Electronics
- Institute for Computer Research
- Institute for Innovation Research
- Institute for Polymer Research
- Institute for Quantum Computing
- Water Institute
- Waterloo Artificial Intelligence Institute
- Waterloo Centre for Automotive Research
- Waterloo Centre for Groundwater Research
- Waterloo Centre for Microbial Research
- Waterloo Institute for Nanotechnology
- Waterloo Institute for Sustainable Energy

=== Labs ===
- Autonomous Vehicle Research and Intelligence Lab (AVRIL)
- Pearl Sullivan Engineering Ideas Clinic
- Sedra Student Design Centre
- Robohub

== Hack the North ==
University of Waterloo Engineering hosts Hack the North, Canada's biggest hackathon that was launched in 2014. Over 3,000 students around the world participate, creating software or hardware projects from scratch in 36 hours.

== Hive Mind Program ==
Originally conceived in 2020, the Hive Mind program is run out of Waterloo Engineering Outreach's Women In Engineering program. It offers online and one-on-one tutoring sessions to high school students of all genders in advanced functions, calculus, chemistry, and physics. Since its launch, over 60 per cent of Hive participants have been students who identify as female.

== Design Days ==
Hosted at the Pearl Sullivan Engineering IDEAS Clinic, the two-day Design Days event held during orientation week is for all 14 undergraduate programs at Waterloo Engineering. Modelled on the concept of a hackathon, the annual event gives over 2,000 students hands-on learning experiences as they solve open-ended problems.

== Design Teams ==
=== Waterloo Aerial Robotics Group ===
The Waterloo Aerial Robotics Group (WARG) is a student-led design team, specializing in creating unmanned autonomous drones for competition in the annual AEAC.

== Waterloo Engineering Heritage Project ==
In 2022, the faculty launched Waterloo Engineering's Heritage Project. Led by Dean Mary Wells, the project will feature a collection of recordings made with former deans - including at 2015 interview with Pearl Sullivan - faculty members and others who will share their Waterloo Engineering experiences and perspectives of the past. The recordings will be available on the university's archives site beginning in early 2023.

== Student life ==
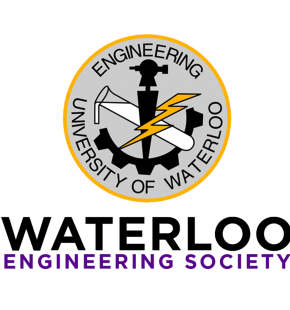
The Crest of the Waterloo Engineering Society

Many students in the faculty participate in the University of Waterloo Engineering Society. Due to the co-op nature of the program, the society is split into two sub societies, named "Society A" and "Society B". Each term, one society is in academic term, and the other on a co-op work term. The society in academic term runs events both on and off campus as well as services in the society's office. Its charity events include an annual "Bus Push" where student volunteers raise money by pulling a Grand River Transit bus seven kilometres from campus to Kitchener City Hall.

First-year students receive yellow hard hats during their orientation week symbolizing their adherence of the principles of engineering.

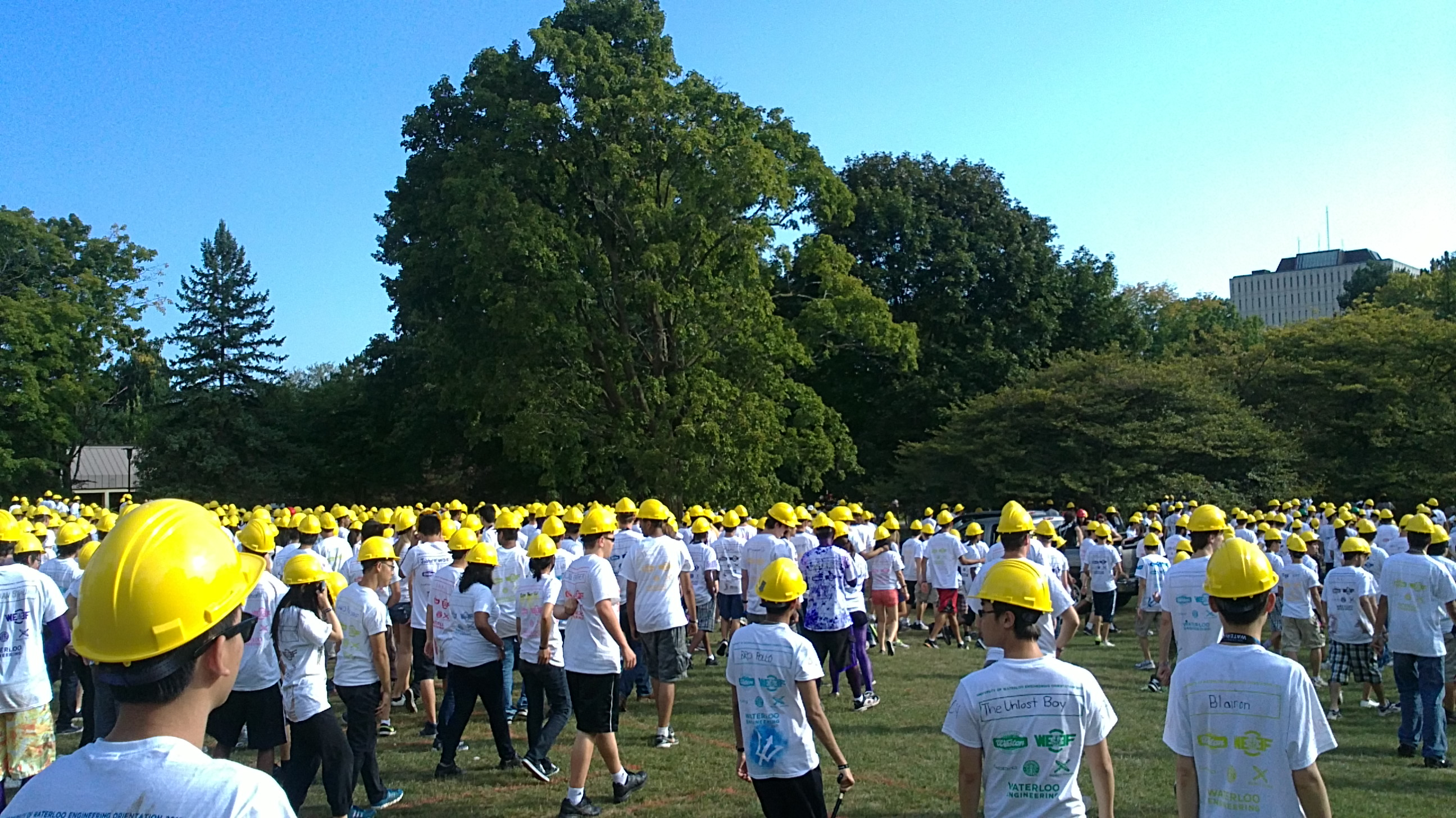
University of Waterloo Faculty of Engineering students wearing their hardhats during frosh week

The society's mascot is a 60" (1,524mm) pipe wrench called the TOOL (formerly the RIDGID TOOL). TOOL appears at events organized by the Engineering Society.

Engineering students are grouped into classes based on their program. Class sizes never exceed 150 students and vary between disciplines. There are over 100 students for Nanotechnology, Computer, Electrical, Mechanical, Mechatronics, Software and Systems Design Engineering, and smaller class sizes for Chemical, Environmental, Management, Civil and Geological Engineering as well as Architecture.

University of Waterloo Engineering hosts speedfriending events that enable students to interact virtually.

University of Waterloo Engineering students participate in engineering-related competitions. In 2016, a student team won the grand prize at the Hydrogen Education Foundation's 2016 Hydrogen Student Design Contest - a competition between teams from around the globe.

In 2018, a University of Waterloo Engineering student team took first place in the Intercollegiate Rocket Engineering Competition at Spaceport America in New Mexico. In 2019, a team won the Team Sportsmanship award in the same competition.

At the 2020 Canadian Engineering Competition, University of Waterloo Engineering student teams won first place in the Innovative Design category and the Programming challenge. And in 2021, a student team was at the top of the standings in VEX U robotics event operated by the Robotics Education and Competition Foundation. The team was ranked first among 77 teams from around the world.

In 2022, a Waterloo Engineering student won the top prize in the student category of Build the Impossible, an international competition organized to increase visibility around the world to mass timber innovation. And a student team from the University of Waterloo took top prize in the water environment design category at the Water Environment Federation's 2022 Student Design Competition in New Orleans.

== Capstone Design ==
The Capstone Design project allows Waterloo Engineering students to conceptualize and design a project that is related to their discipline. Capstone ideas led to the creation of Athos, BufferBox, the Myo Armband and the Pebble smartwatch.

== WatPD-Engineering (Formerly PDEng) ==
The PDEng (Professional Development for Engineering Students) began in January 2005 as a series of courses completed by students in the faculty of engineering during their coop terms. On May 12, 2010, The Dean of Engineering recommeneded overhauling the program and it was replaced by WatPD-Engineering in the Winter 2011 term.

The WatPD-Engineering program is run by WatPD and is overseen by the WatPD-Engineering Curriculum Committee. Engineering students are required to complete five PD courses, all of which are completed during their work term. Once they have finished their compulsory courses, they must choose three elective courses from those offered in subjects ranging from communications to professionalism and ethics.

== Waterloo Cases in Design Engineering ==
Waterloo Cases in Design Engineering (WCDE) was formed in 2005. It is a group that has developed and implemented over 100 case studies since its inception, using knowledge gained by students during their work terms. The cases demonstrate engineering analysis and design across all engineering disciplines and are used in classrooms at the University of Waterloo Faculty of Engineering and other international universities, as well as at conferences around the world.

== Notable alumni ==
Name	Degree	Discipline	Known for	Notes
V. K. Aatre	Graduate	Electrical Engineering	Scientist and former head of a Research and Development Organisation	
Romesh Batra	Graduate	Mechanical engineering	Virginia Polytechnic Institute and State University professor	
Rod Coutts	Undergraduate	Electrical Engineering	Founder, Teklogix; namesake of the Rod Coutts Engineering Lecture Building at University of Waterloo	
Richard Ducharme	Undergraduate	Civil Engineering	General Manager of Transportation for Edmonton	
Jon Evans	Undergraduate	Electrical Engineering	Arthur Ellis Awards winner	
Chris Hadfield	Graduate	Mechanical Engineering	Astronaut	
Fariborz Haghighat	Graduate	System Design Engineering	Professor at the Concordia University	
Mike Lazaridis	Honorary	Electrical Engineering	Co-founder, Research in Motion	
Rasmus Lerdorf	Undergraduate	Systems Design Engineering	PHP creator	
Chuck Magro	Graduate	Chemical Engineering	President of Nutrien	
Apoorva Mehta	Graduate	Electrical Engineering	Founder, Instacart	
Parker Mitchell	Undergraduate	Mechanical Engineering	Co-founder, Engineers Without Borders (Canada)	
Chamath Palihapitiya	Undergraduate	Electrical Engineering	Venture capitalist, engineer, SPAC sponsor and the founder and CEO of Social Capital, benefactor of University of Waterloo Engineering Palihapitiya Venture Creation Fund	
Cole Pearn	Graduate	Mechanical Engineering	NASCAR crew chief	
Robert Rosehart	Graduate	Chemical Engineering	Former President of Wilfrid Laurier University	
George Roter	Undergraduate	Mechanical Engineering	Co-CEO of Engineers Without Borders (Canada)	
Deb Roy	Undergraduate	Computer Engineering	Scientist and Director of the MIT Center for Constructive Communication	
Prem Saran Satsangi	Graduate	Electrical Engineering	Spiritual leader of Radhasoami faith, Dayalbagh, Chairman (ACE), Dayalbagh Educational Institute, Dean (Academics) at IIT Delhi, system scientist	
Vahid Tarokh	Graduate	Electrical Engineering	Professor at Harvard University	
Susan Tighe	Graduate	Civil Engineering	Canada Research Chair in Sustainable Pavement and Infrastructure Management	
Claire J. Tomlin	Undergraduate	Electrical Engineering	Professor at UC Berkeley and Researcher	
Donald J. Walker	Graduate	Mechanical Engineering	Former C.E.O. of Magna International	
James Won-Ki Hong	Graduate	Computer Science	Dean of Graduate of Information Technology and Professor of Dept. of Computer Science and Engineering at POSTECH	

== Notable faculty ==
Name	Relationship	Discipline	Known for	Notes
Vijay Bhargava	Professor	Electrical Engineering	Professor at the University of British Columbia	
Thomas Brzustowski	Professor	Mechanical Engineering	Engineer, academic, and civil servant	
Savvas Chamberlain	Professor	Engineering	Member of the Order of Canada and CEO of EXEL Research	
Mohamed Elmasry	Professor	Engineering	Writer for The Globe and Mail	
Carolyn Hansson	Professor	Mechanical and Mechatronics Engineering	Member of the Order of Canada	
Robert Jan van Pelt	Professor	Architecture	Architectural Historian	
Victor Hugo Quintana	Professor (Retired)	Engineering	Distinguished Professor Emeritus	
Adel Sedra	Dean	Engineering	Former Dean of the University of Waterloo Faculty of Engineering	
Pearl Sullivan	Dean	Engineering	Former Dean of the University of Waterloo Faculty of Engineering	
Robert A. Varin	Professor	Mechanical and Mechatronics Engineering	Professor Emeritus, University of Waterloo Faculty of Engineering	
Douglas T. Wright	Professor	Civil Engineering	Civil Engineer, President Emeritus of University of Waterloo Faculty of Engineering	
