= Mazgan =

Village in Markazi province, Iran

Mazgan Persian: مزگان
- Village
- Location within Iran
- Coordinates: 34°00′36″N 50°22′54″E
- Country: Iran
- Province: Markazi
- County: Mahallat
- District: Central
- Rural District: Khurheh

Population (2016)
  - Total: 10
- Time zone: UTC+3:30 (IRST)

Mazgan (Persian: مزگان) (Note: Also romanized as Mazgān and Mozgān; also known as Mazqān, Mozhgan, and Mozjān) is a village in Khurheh Rural District of the Central District in Mahallat County, Markazi province, Iran.

== Demographics ==
=== Population ===
At the time of the 2006 National Census, the village's population was 15 in six households. The following census in 2011 counted seven people in four households. The 2016 census measured the population of the village as 10 people in four households.
