= Bozi Jan =

Village in Markazi province, Iran

Bozi Jan Persian: بزي جان
- Village
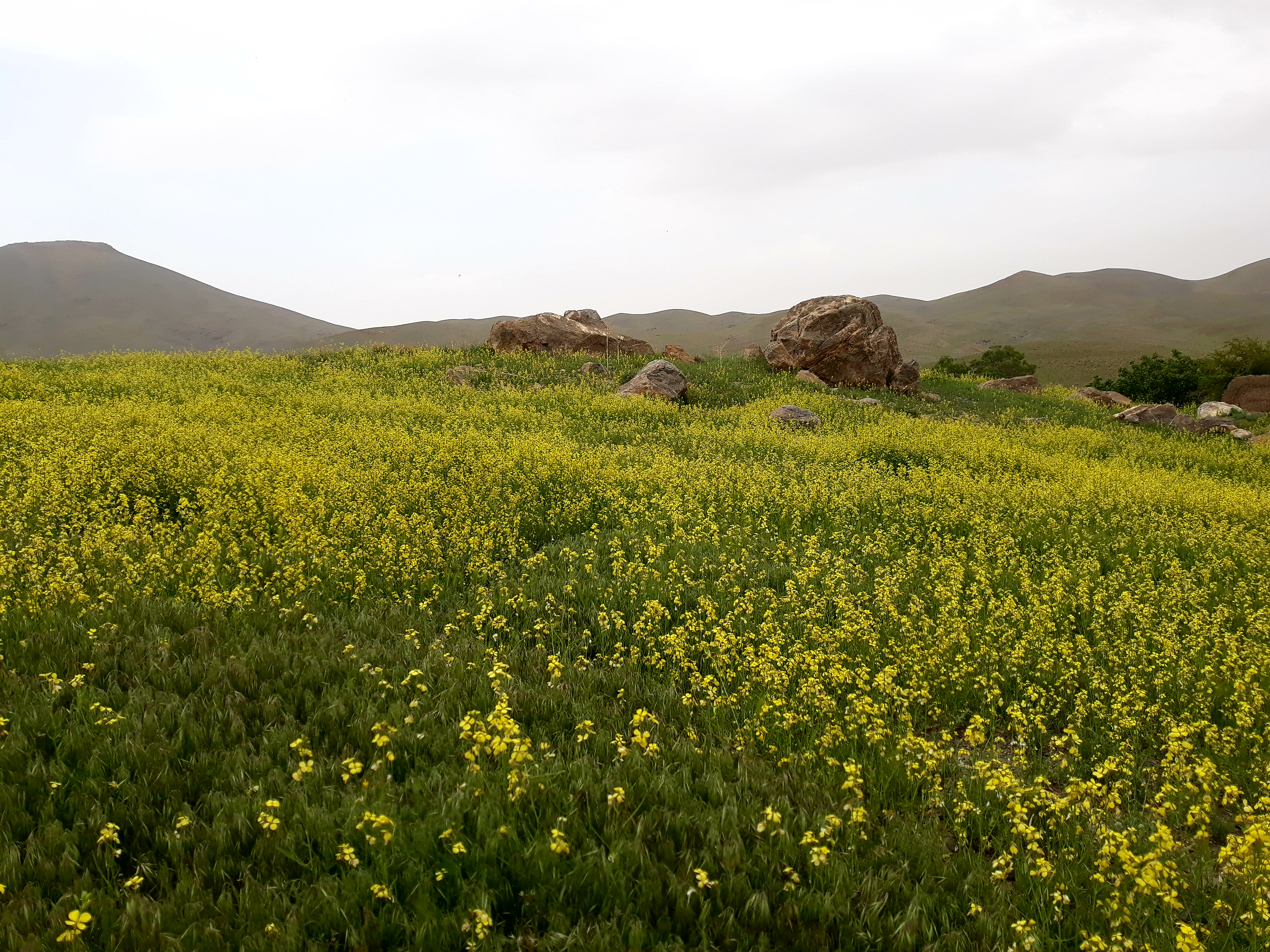
- Landscape near the village of Bozi Jan

- Location within Iran
- Coordinates: 33°55′21″N 50°14′19″E
- Country: Iran
- Province: Markazi
- County: Mahallat
- District: Central
- Rural District: Baqerabad

Population (2016)
  - Total: 416
- Time zone: UTC+3:30 (IRST)

Bozi Jan (Persian: بزي جان) (Note: Also romanized as Bozī Jān; also known as Boz Jūn, Buz-i-Jān, and Buzjūn) is a village in Baqerabad Rural District of the Central District in Mahallat County, Markazi province, Iran.

== Demographics ==
=== Population ===
At the time of the 2006 National Census, the village's population was 620 in 184 households. The following census in 2011 counted 469 people in 172 households. The 2016 census measured the population of the village as 416 people in 161 households.
