= Judan, Iran =

Judan جودان
- Village
- Location within Iran
- Coordinates: 33°46′55″N 50°26′22″E
- Country: Iran
- Province: Markazi
- County: Mahallat
- Bakhsh: Central
- Rural District: Baqerabad

Population (2006)
  - Total: 101
- Time zone: UTC+3:30 (IRST)
  - Summer (DST): UTC+4:30 (IRDT)

Judan (Persian: جودان, also Romanized as Jūdān, Joodan, and Jowdān) is a village in Baqerabad Rural District, in the Central District of Mahallat County, Markazi Province, Iran. At the 2006 census, its population was 101, in 29 families.
