= Aljan =

Village in Markazi province, Iran

Aljan Persian: الجان
- Village
- Location within Iran
- Coordinates: 34°06′38″N 50°20′38″E
- Country: Iran
- Province: Markazi
- County: Mahallat
- District: Central
- Rural District: Khurheh

Population (2016)
  - Total: Below reporting threshold
- Time zone: UTC+3:30 (IRST)

Aljan (Persian: الجان) (Note: Also romanized as Aljān; also known as Alchān, Algān, and Algon) is a village in Khurheh Rural District of the Central District in Mahallat County, Markazi province, Iran.

== Demographics ==
=== Population ===
At the time of the 2006 National Census, the village's population was 13 in four households. The following censuses in 2011 and 2016 counted a population below the reporting threshold.
