= Khvorheh =

Khvorheh or Khurheh or Khoorheh or Khowrheh (Persian: خورهه), also rendered as Khurreh, may refer to:

- Temple of Khvorheh
- Khvorheh, Lorestan, a village in Lorestan Province, Iran
- Khurheh, Markazi, a village in Markazi Province, Iran
- Khurheh Rural District, an administrative subdivision of Markazi Province, Iran
