= Neyneh =

Village in Markazi province, Iran

Neyneh Persian: نينه
- Village
- Location within Iran
- Coordinates: 34°01′33″N 50°31′20″E
- Country: Iran
- Province: Markazi
- County: Mahallat
- District: Central
- Rural District: Khurheh

Population (2016)
  - Total: 105
- Time zone: UTC+3:30 (IRST)

Neyneh (Persian: نينه) (Note: Also romanized as Nīneh; also known as Naina) is a village in Khurheh Rural District of the Central District in Mahallat County, Markazi province, Iran.

== Demographics ==
=== Population ===
At the time of the 2006 National Census, the village's population was 156 in 65 households. The following census in 2011 counted 109 people in 47 households. The 2016 census measured the population of the village as 105 people in 45 households.
