= Khurheh, Markazi =

Village in Markazi province, Iran

Khurheh Persian: خورهه
- Village
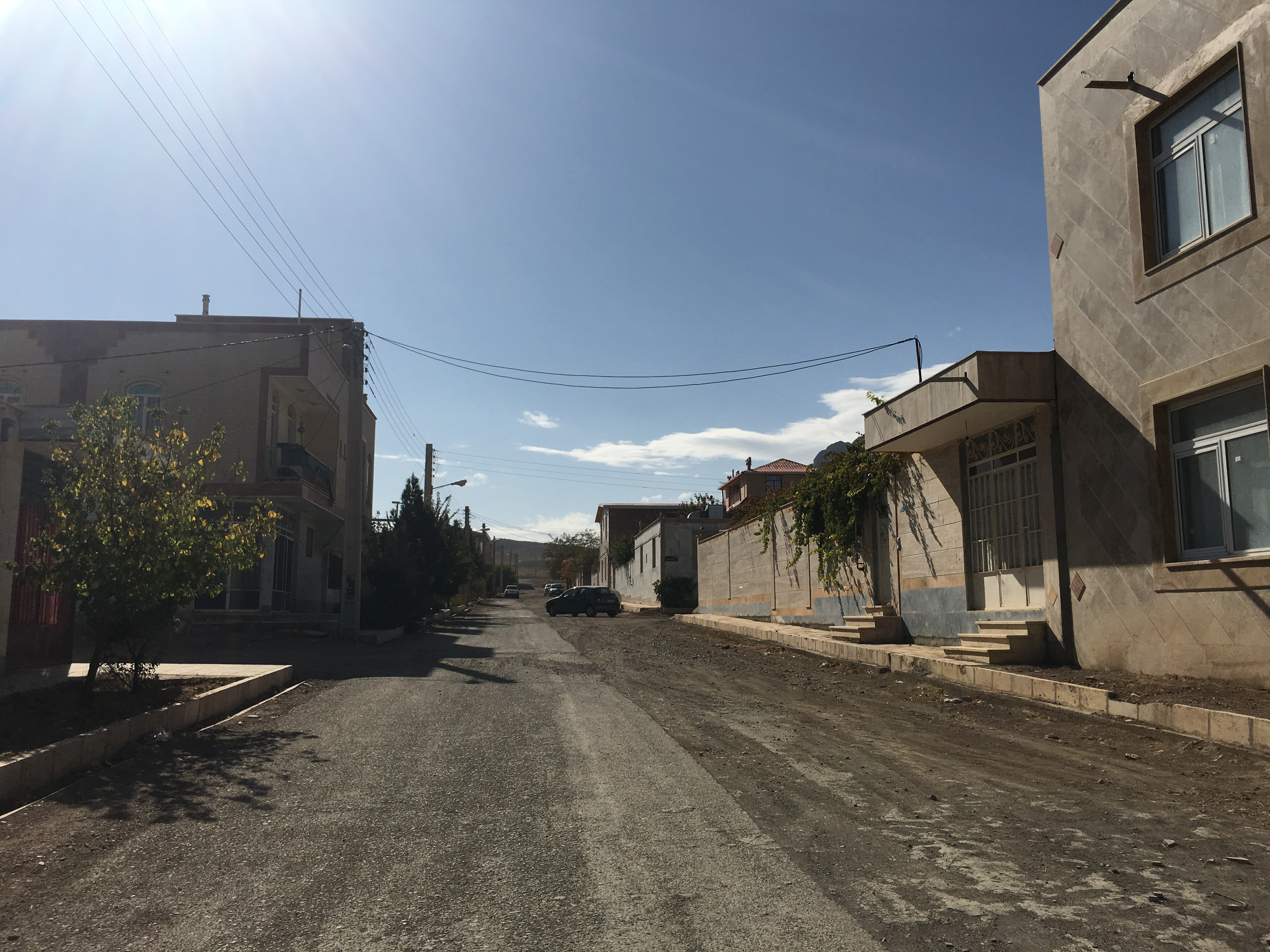
- Street in the village of Khurheh

- Location within Iran
- Coordinates: 34°04′30″N 50°29′31″E
- Country: Iran
- Province: Markazi
- County: Mahallat
- District: Central
- Rural District: Khurheh

Population (2016)
  - Total: 425
- Time zone: UTC+3:30 (IRST)

Khurheh (Persian: خورهه) (Note: Also romanized as Khoorheh, Khūrheh, and Khvorheh; also known as Khowrhen, Khūra, Khūrreh, and Kūrheh) is a village in, and the capital of, Khurheh Rural District in the Central District of Mahallat County, Markazi province, Iran.

Khurheh is 12 miles (19 km) north of Mahallat, Markazi province of Iran, with historical buildings believed to be of Parthian period. This site was first excavated by Naser al-Din Shah Qajar, on a treasure hunt. It also has an inscription on a rock that date to Seljuq Empire.

== Demographics ==
=== Population ===
At the time of the 2006 National Census, the village's population was 627 in 224 households. The following census in 2011 counted 429 people in 170 households. The 2016 census measured the population of the village as 425 people in 188 households, the most populous in its rural district.
