= Kuh-e Sefid, Markazi =

Village in Markazi province, Iran

Kuh-e Sefid Persian: كوه سفيد
- Village
- Location within Iran
- Coordinates: 33°50′10″N 50°17′17″E
- Country: Iran
- Province: Markazi
- County: Mahallat
- District: Central
- Rural District: Baqerabad

Population (2016)
  - Total: 123
- Time zone: UTC+3:30 (IRST)

Kuh-e Sefid (Persian: كوه سفيد) (Note: Also romanized as Kooh Sefid, Kūh Sefīd, Kūh-e Sefīd, and Kūhsafīd) is a village in Baqerabad Rural District of the Central District in Mahallat County, Markazi province, Iran.

== Demographics ==
=== Population ===
At the time of the 2006 National Census, the village's population was 73 in 23 households. The following census in 2011 counted 76 people in 25 households. The 2016 census measured the population of the village as 123 people in 42 households.
