= Falaver-e Bala =

Falaver-e Bala فلاوربالا
- Village
- Country: Iran
- Province: Markazi
- County: Mahallat
- Bakhsh: Central
- Rural District: Baqerabad

Population (2006)
  - Total: 19
- Time zone: UTC+3:30 (IRST)
  - Summer (DST): UTC+4:30 (IRDT)

Falaver-e Bala (Persian: فلاوربالا, also Romanized as Falāver-e Bālā) is a village in Baqerabad Rural District, in the Central District of Mahallat County, Markazi Province, Iran. At the 2006 census, its population was 19, in 4 families.
