= Lirian =

Lirian (Persian: ليريان) may refer to:

- Lirian, Khomeyn
- Lirian, Mahallat
