= Tayeqan, Markazi =

Village in Markazi province, Iran

Tayeqan Persian: طايقان
- Village
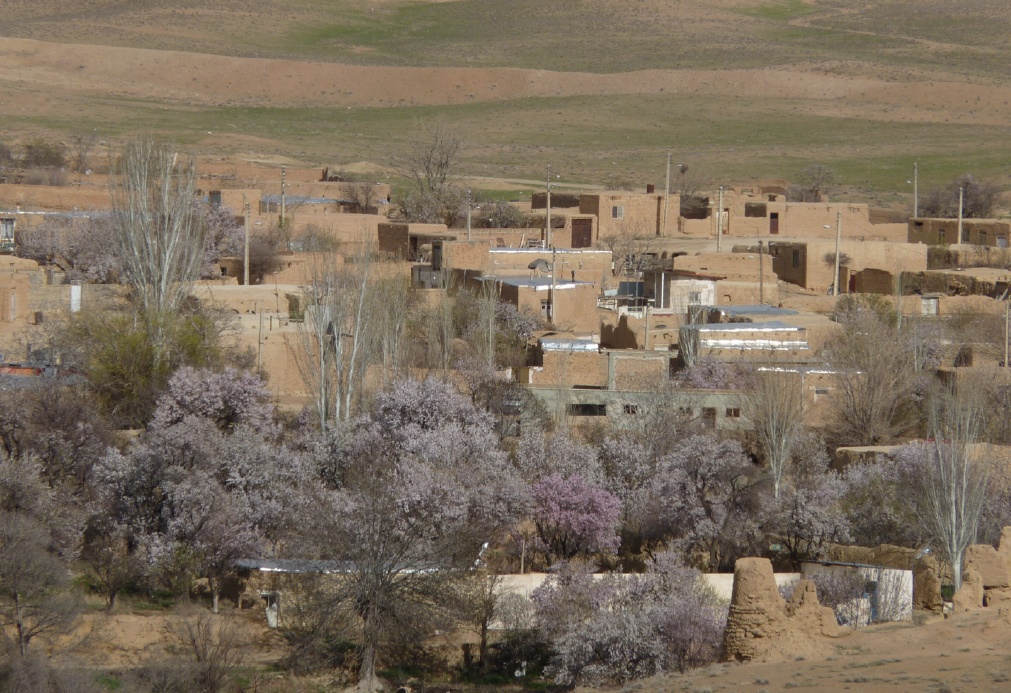
- The village of Tayeqan

- Location within Iran
- Coordinates: 34°02′49″N 50°23′28″E
- Country: Iran
- Province: Markazi
- County: Mahallat
- District: Central
- Rural District: Khurheh

Population (2016)
  - Total: 210
- Time zone: UTC+3:30 (IRST)

Tayeqan (Persian: طايقان) (Note: Also romanized as Ţāyeqān) is a village in Khurheh Rural District of the Central District in Mahallat County, Markazi province, Iran.

== Demographics ==
=== Population ===
At the time of the 2006 National Census, the village's population was 337 in 128 households. The following census in 2011 counted 253 people in 116 households. The 2016 census measured the population of the village as 210 people in 106 households.
