= Mary Wells (disambiguation) =

Mary Wells (1943–1992) was an American singer.

Mary Wells may also refer to:

- Mary Wells (album), a 1965 album by Mary Wells
- Mary Wells (actress) (1762–1829), English actress
- Mary Wells (engineer), Canadian engineer
- Mary K. Wells (1920–2000), American television writer and actress
- Mary Fletcher Wells (died 1893), philanthropist, educator, and founder of the Trinity School
- Mary Wells Lawrence (born 1928), retired American advertising executive
- Mary Wells Morris (1764–1819), person that Wellsboro, Pennsylvania is named after
