= Lorijan =

Village in Markazi province, Iran

Lorijan Persian: لريجان
- Village
- Location within Iran
- Coordinates: 33°54′28″N 50°33′28″E
- Country: Iran
- Province: Markazi
- County: Mahallat
- District: Central
- Rural District: Baqerabad

Population (2016)
  - Total: 508
- Time zone: UTC+3:30 (IRST)

Lorijan (Persian: لريجان) (Note: Also romanized as Larijan, Larījān, and Lorījān; also known as Lārījān and Lirīān) is a village in Baqerabad Rural District of the Central District in Mahallat County, Markazi province, Iran.

== Demographics ==
=== Population ===
At the time of the 2006 National Census, the village's population was 597 in 166 households. The following census in 2011 counted 619 people in 186 households. The 2016 census measured the population of the village as 508 people in 170 households.
