= Judan =

Judan may refer to:

- Judan, Iran, a village in Markazi Province, Iran
- Judan, Isfahan, a village in Isfahan Province, Iran
- The 10th degree black belt in Dan rank in Japan
- Judan (Go), a Go competition in Japan
- A shogi competition in Japan between 1962 and 1987; see Ryu-oh
- Kaohsiung Arena metro station (巨蛋車站; Jùdàn Chēzhàn), Kaohsiung Metro, Taiwan
