= Yekeh Chah =

Village in Markazi province, Iran

Yekeh Chah Persian: يكه چاه
- Village
- Location within Iran
- Coordinates: 33°41′01″N 50°31′25″E
- Country: Iran
- Province: Markazi
- County: Mahallat
- District: Central
- Rural District: Baqerabad

Population (2016)
  - Total: 186
- Time zone: UTC+3:30 (IRST)

Yekeh Chah (Persian: يكه چاه) (Note: Also romanized as Yekeh Chāh and Yekkeh Chāh; also known as Ḩammām) is a village in Baqerabad Rural District of the Central District in Mahallat County, Markazi province, Iran.

== Demographics ==
=== Population ===
At the time of the 2006 National Census, the village's population was 83 in 19 households. The following census in 2011 counted 50 people in 13 households. The 2016 census measured the population of the village as 186 people in 57 households.
