= Varin-e Bala =

Village in Markazi province, Iran

Varin-e Bala Persian: ورين بالا
- Village
- Location within Iran
- Coordinates: 34°02′06″N 50°22′07″E
- Country: Iran
- Province: Markazi
- County: Mahallat
- District: Central
- Rural District: Khurheh

Population (2016)
  - Total: 195
- Time zone: UTC+3:30 (IRST)

Varin-e Bala (Persian: ورين بالا) (Note: Also romanized as Varīn-e Bālā; also known as Vār, Var-e Bālā, Var-e ‘Olyā, Varīn, Varīn-e ‘Olyā, and Vīr) is a village in Khurheh Rural District of the Central District in Mahallat County, Markazi province, Iran.

== Demographics ==
=== Population ===
At the time of the 2006 National Census, the village's population was 482 in 171 households. The following census in 2011 counted 282 people in 106 households. The 2016 census measured the population of the village as 195 people in 87 households.
