= Varin-e Pain =

Village in Markazi province, Iran

Varin-e Pain Persian: ورين پائين
- Village
- Location within Iran
- Coordinates: 34°02′44″N 50°22′19″E
- Country: Iran
- Province: Markazi
- County: Mahallat
- District: Central
- Rural District: Khurheh

Population (2016)
  - Total: 260
- Time zone: UTC+3:30 (IRST)

Varin-e Pain (Persian: ورين پائين) (Note: Also romanized as Varīn-e Pā’īn; also known as Var-e Pā’īn, Var-e Soflá, and Varīn-e Soflá) is a village in Khurheh Rural District of the Central District in Mahallat County, Markazi province, Iran.

== Demographics ==
=== Population ===
At the time of the 2006 National Census, the village's population was 393 in 119 households. The following census in 2011 counted 296 people in 102 households. The 2016 census measured the population of the village as 260 people in 94 households.
