= Tayqan =

Tayqan and Tayeqan (Persian: طايقان) may refer to:

- Tayeqan, Markazi
- Tayqan, Qom
