= James Hong (disambiguation) =

James Hong (born 1929) is an American actor.

James Hong may also refer to:

- James Hong (entrepreneur), co-founder of the online ratings site Hot or Not
- James T. Hong, Taiwanese-American filmmaker
- James Won-Ki Hong (born 1959), business executive
