= University of Waterloo School of Architecture =

Architecture school of the University of Waterloo

Coordinates: 43°21′30″N 80°19′00″W

School of Architecture
- Parent institution: University of Waterloo Faculty of Engineering
- Director: Maya Przybylski
- Academic staff: 20
- Location: Cambridge, Ontario, Canada
- Website: uwaterloo.ca/architecture/

The School of Architecture is one of the professional schools of the University of Waterloo. It offers a professional program in architecture accredited by the Canadian Architectural Certification Board at the master's level (M.Arch.). It is part of the Faculty of Engineering and is located on a satellite campus in Cambridge, Ontario, Canada. Some of Canada's most prominent architects are graduates of the school.

The school moved to a former factory building in Cambridge in September 2004, to provide more space for the school as well as to spur economic activity in the downtown area. It was designed by Levitt Goodman Architects.

== Academic programs ==
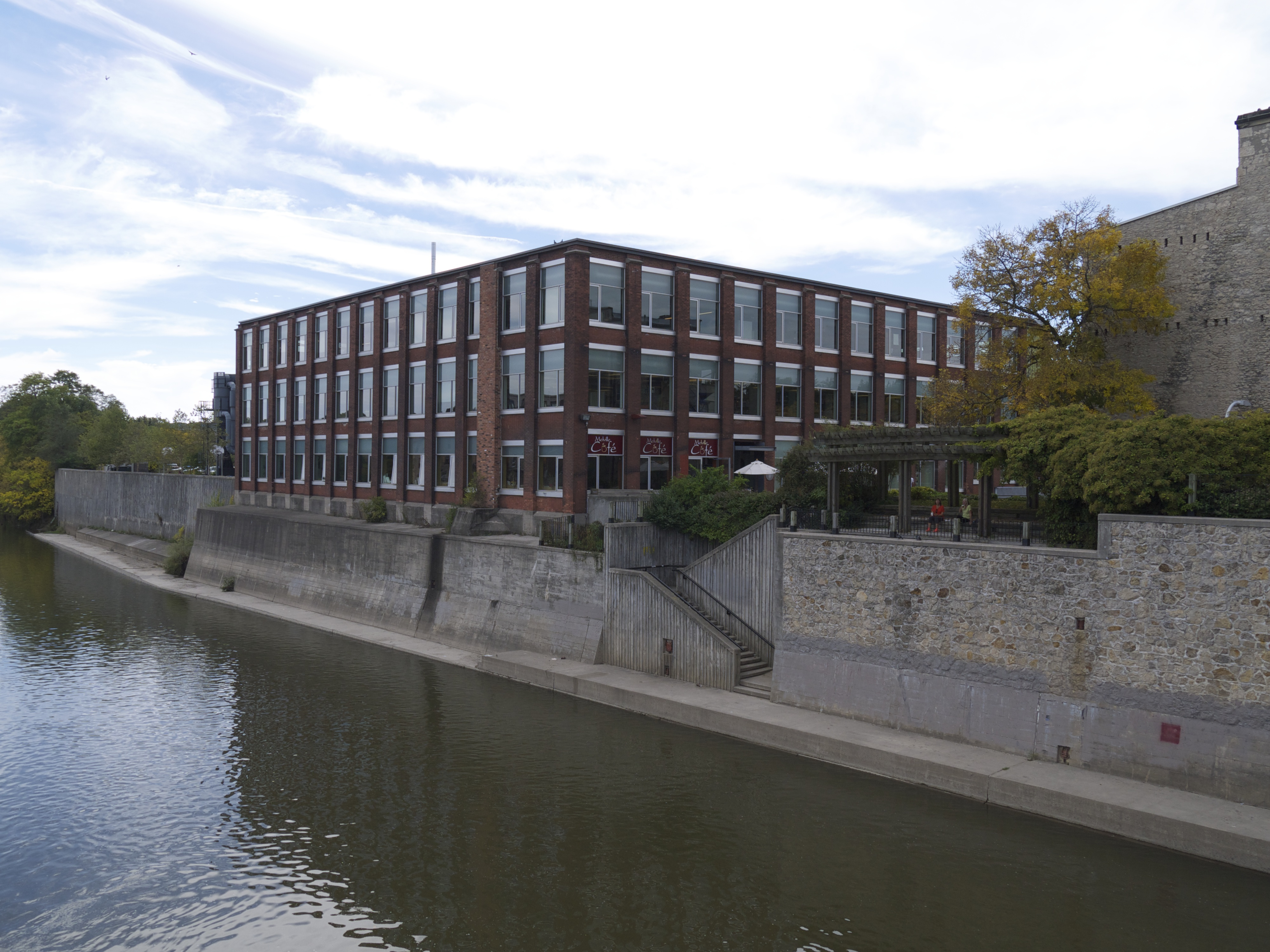
The school sites by the banks of the Grand River

Waterloo offers an integrated two-degree professional architecture program, accredited by the CACB and NAAB. The majority of the professional coursework is completed in the Bachelor of Architectural Studies program, which is followed by a nominal one year, research-based Master of Architecture degree.

=== Bachelor of Architectural Studies ===
The B.A.S. is a five-year, pre-professional honours degree in architecture. Design Studios and courses in Cultural History, Building Technology and Environmental Design comprise the core of the curriculum. Students must complete five semesters of practical, architecture-related work experience as part of the university's co-op program. Students most often find employment in Canada, the United States, and Europe.

=== Master of Architecture ===
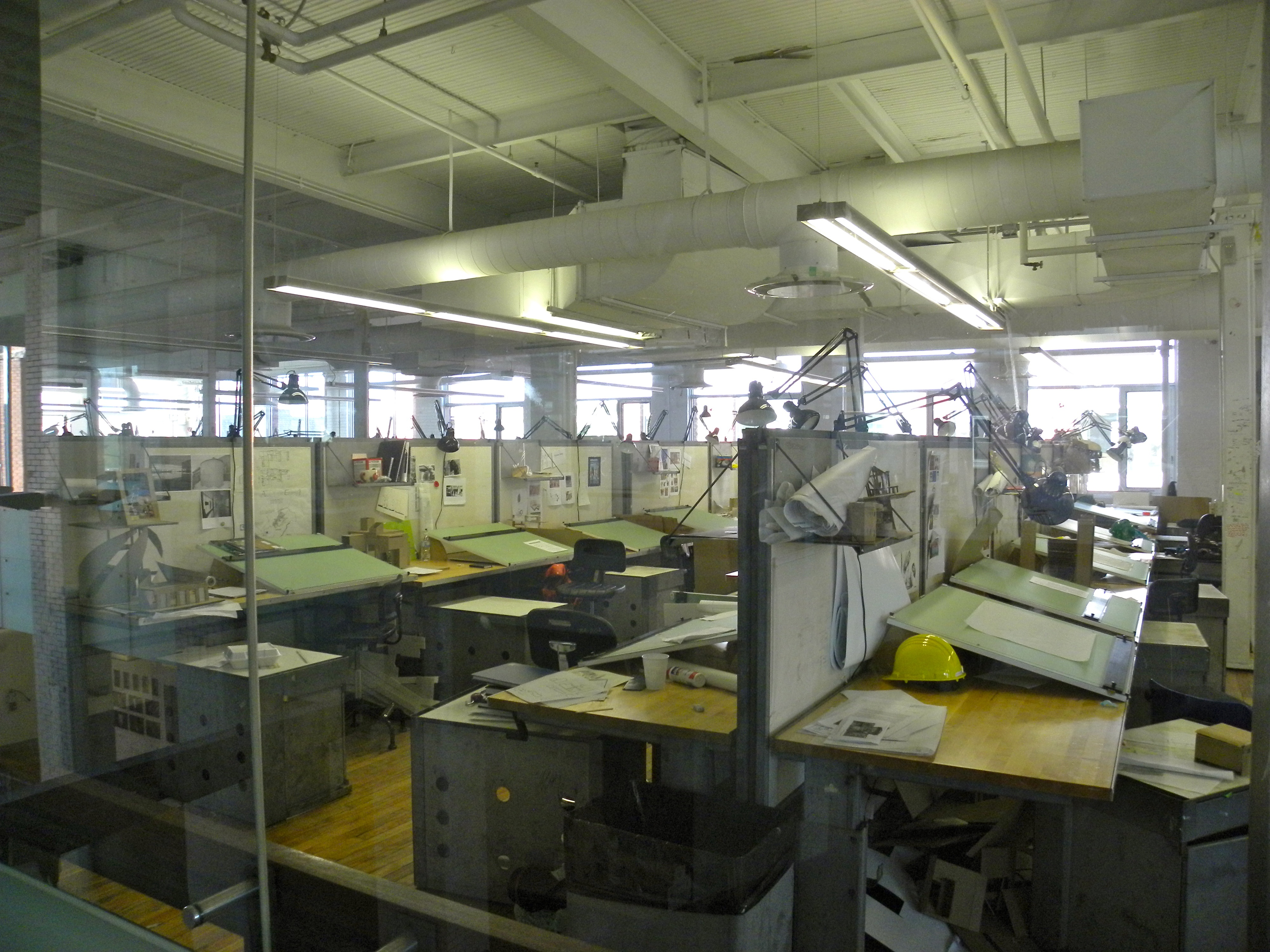
Inside the Cambridge studio

The M.Arch. is the professional degree granted by the school. A design or research thesis is the core component of the program, preparing students for professional or academic careers. Students who have completed the B.A.S. program may enter directly into the M.Arch. program.

=== Rome Program ===
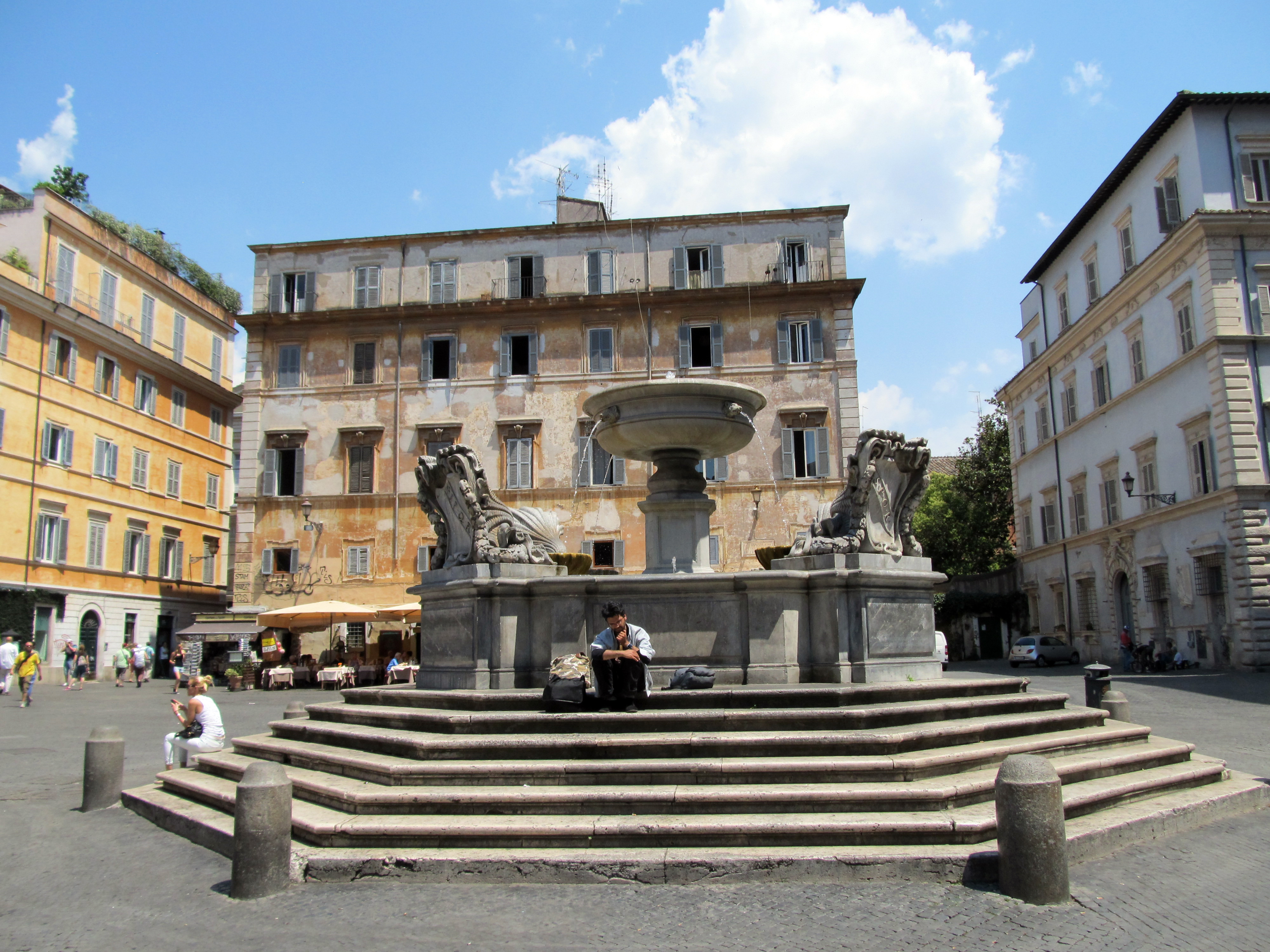
Waterloo studio in Rome is located in the Trastevere neighbourhood

Founded in 1979 by Rick Haldenby, the Rome Program is offered to all undergraduate students in the fall term of fourth year. The studio is located on one floor of a 16th-century palazzo located next to Piazza di Santa Maria in Trastevere. Since the foundation of the program the School has played an architectural role in Rome, involving Italian academics and practitioners, creating links with Italian and foreign institutions, and widely exhibiting and publishing the work of faculty and students. The Waterloo Rome Program shares an exchange program with the D'Annunzio University of Chieti–Pescara. In the Spring and Summer semesters, the same studio is utilized by Pratt Institute.

== Notable alumni ==
- Omer Arbel - Designer of the 2010 Winter Olympic medals (Vancouver)
- Alison Brooks - Stirling Prize winner, Alison Brooks Architects (London)
- Siamak Hariri - Architect, Baháʼí Temple in Santiago, Chile, Hariri Pontarini Architects (Toronto)
- Paul Raff - Governor General's Award winner, Paul Raff Studio/RVTR (Toronto)
- Brigitte Shim - Governor General's Award winner, Shim-Sutcliffe Architects (Toronto)
- Stephen Teeple - Governor General's Award winner, Teeple Architects (Toronto)
