= Division of IT Convergence Engineering =

Research institution in South Korea

Division of IT Convergence Engineering (ITCE)
- IT Convergence Engineering
- Type: Private
- Established: 2009
- Dean: James Won-Ki Hong
- Academic staff: 23
- Postgraduates: 50
- Location: Pohang, North Gyeongsang, South Korea
- Campus: Urban
- Website: itce.postech.ac.kr

- Division of IT Convergence Engineering
- Hangul: 정보전자융합공학부
- Hanja: 情報電子融合工學部
- RR: Jeongbo jeonja yunghap gonghakbu
- MR: Chŏngbo chŏnja yunghap konghakpu

The Division of IT Convergence Engineering was founded in March 2009, and will be funded by the Korean Ministry of Education, Science and Technology as a WCU (World Class University) Program. It utilizes resources from POSTECH’s Division of IT Convergence Engineering.

== History ==
Month	Year	Fact
Sep	2008	Applied for MEST's World Class University (WCU) Program (Type 1: Establishment of Graduate School)
Dec	2008	Selected as one of two IT Convergence WCU Projects
Jan	2009	Got approval to recruit 25 students / year for ITCE
Jan	2009	Held the 1st WCU ITCE Workshop
Mar	2009	Established Division of IT Convergence Engineering
Apr	2009	Held the 2nd WCU ITCE Workshop
May	2009	Recruiting students (for Sept/2009 & Mar/2010)
Sep	2009	Opened Division of ITCE for Education
Oct	2009	Held the 1st Int. Symposium on IT Convergence Engineering
Feb	2010	Held the 3rd WCU ITCE workshop
Aug	2010	Held the 2nd Int. Symposium on IT Convergence Engineering
Sept	2010	Held the 4th WCU ITCE workshop
Jan	2011	5th ITCE Workshop
July	2011	Held the 3rd Int. Symposium on IT Convergence Engineering
