= Khurheh Rural District =

Rural district in Markazi province, Iran

Khurheh Rural District Persian: دهستان خورهه
- Rural District
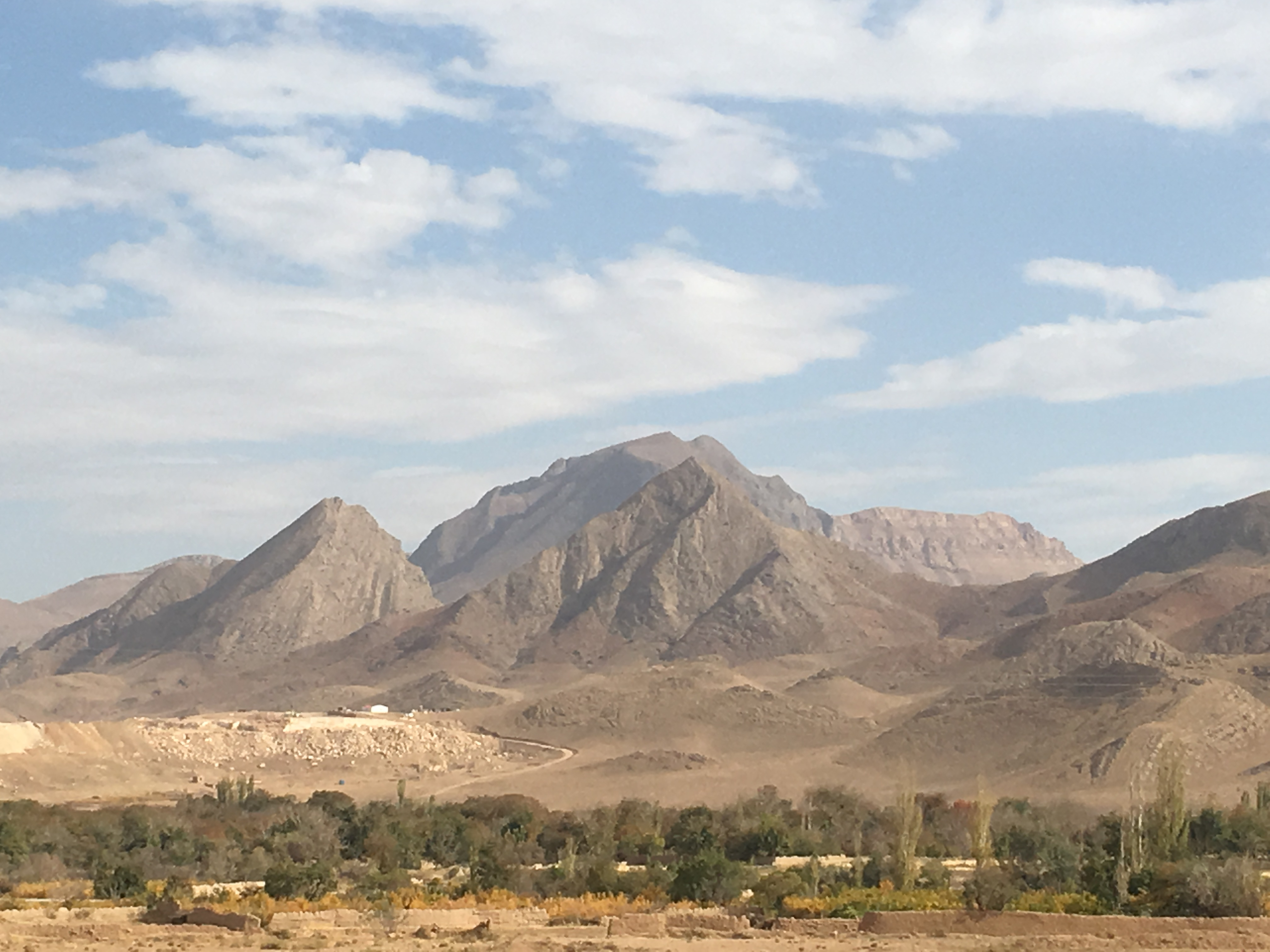
- Landscape in Khurheh Rural District

- Location within Iran
- Coordinates: 34°03′N 50°23′E
- Country: Iran
- Province: Markazi
- County: Mahallat
- District: Central
- Established: 1987
- Capital: Khurheh

Population (2016)
  - Total: 1,405
- Time zone: UTC+3:30 (IRST)

Khurheh Rural District (Persian: دهستان خورهه) is in the Central District of Mahallat County, Markazi province, Iran. Its capital is the village of Khurheh.

== Demographics ==
=== Population ===
At the time of the 2006 National Census, the rural district's population was 2,290 in 793 households. There were 1,561 inhabitants in 614 households at the following census of 2011. The 2016 census measured the population of the rural district as 1,405 in 609 households. The most populous of its 11 villages was Khurheh, with 425 people.

=== Other villages in the rural district ===
- Aljan
- Hajjiabad
- Isaabad
- Lanjeh
- Mazgan
- Neyneh
- Tayeqan
- Varin-e Bala
- Varin-e Pain
