= Fileh Varin =

Fileh Varin فيله ورين
- Village
- Location within Iran
- Coordinates: 36°24′54″N 49°14′50″E
- Country: Iran
- Province: Qazvin
- County: Qazvin
- Bakhsh: Tarom Sofla
- Rural District: Niyarak

Population (2006)
  - Total: 157
- Time zone: UTC+3:30 (IRST)
  - Summer (DST): UTC+4:30 (IRDT)

Fileh Varin (Persian: فيله ورين, also Romanized as Fīleh Varīn, Fīlahwarīn, Pīlehvarīn, Filakhvarin, and Fīlehvarīn; also known as Fīleh Vardīn, Filwarin, and Pīleh Vardīn) is a village in Niyarak Rural District, Tarom Sofla District, Qazvin County, Qazvin Province, Iran. At the 2006 census, its population was 157, in 41 families.
