= Abood Hamam =

Syrian photographer (b. 1975)

- Born: 23 April 1975 (age 51); Raqqa, Syria.
- Other name: Nur Furat
- Occupation: Photographer
- Years active: Since 2011
- Agent: Zenit
- Spouse: No
- Children: No

Abood Hamam (Arabic: عبود حمام) (was born in 1975) is a Syrian photographer, and the only person to expose the Syrian Civil War through his camera to outside world via different internationally broadcasting media. His identity not officially known for last nine consecutive years since 2011. He served Bashar al-Assad of Syria and his family as a camera man. He also served ISIS in similar way, but in very secured manner. He use pseudonym, Nur Furat when he was sending his pictures to international agencies.

A picture can save or kill your life.

— Abood Hamam

== Background ==
=== Early life ===
Abood Hamam was born in Raqqa. He is born into farmer family, whom want him to become a lawyer or teacher. But unfortunately, as his big brother gave him the Russian Camera, Zenit, he felt in love with photography. He also graduate from School of Photography in Damascus.

=== Career ===
As he graduated from college, at 36, he became a head of photography in Sana, which was a news agency as a propaganda arm of the government. His common duty was recording the official activity of the president Hafez al-Assad and Asma al-Assad, his spouse.

When mass street protest begun in 2011, he recorded his prior photography secretly as the Free Syrian Army's attacks in the Damascus, capital of Syria.

In 2013, after Raqqa fall to the rebels, he left Damascus and returned home.

On June 29, 2014, ISIS entered his city of Raqqa. At the request of the fighters, he filmed their entry and gave them the video.

Aboud Hamam remained at his post until the end of 2015, returning after the US-led international coalition announced the "Battle to Liberate Raqqa" at the end of 2016.

In 2017, he was arrested by the intelligence of the People's Protection Units (YPG) in the city of Tabqa, and released a week later after news of his arrest spread in the media.
