= Mary Wells (engineer) =

Canadian materials engineer, metallurgist

Mary A. Wells is a Canadian materials engineer, metallurgist, and academic administrator. She is the dean of the University of Waterloo Faculty of Engineering and the former dean of the College of Engineering and Physical Sciences at the University of Guelph. Her research has focused on heat transfer and microstructure in advanced alloys.

== Education and career ==
Wells's father, a physician, died in a car accident when she was 13, leaving her mother to raise their four children, and Wells chose to become an engineering student at McGill University over the University of Waterloo in part to stay close to her mother and in part because she thought Waterloo might be too difficult. She received her bachelor's degree at McGill in 1987. After three years in the steel industry, working for Stelco, she completed her Ph.D. at the University of British Columbia (UBC) in 1996.

She continued at UBC as an assistant professor of materials engineering, and moved to the University of Waterloo Department of Mechanical and Mechatronics Engineering in 2007. There, she became associate dean for outreach in the Faculty of Engineering in 2008, and chaired the Women in Engineering Committee. In 2017, she moved to the University of Guelph as dean of the College of Engineering and Physical Sciences, and in 2020 she returned to Waterloo as dean of the Faculty of Engineering.

Wells became chair of the Ontario Network for Women in Engineering in 2013. She was president of the Canadian Metallurgical Society (MetSoc) for the 2015–2016 term.

== Recognition ==
Wells was elected as a Fellow of the Canadian Council of Professional Engineers (Engineers Canada) in 2017, as a Fellow of the Canadian Academy of Engineering in 2018, and as a Fellow of the Institute of Materials, Minerals and Mining in 2021.

In 2017, Wells received the NSERC Award for Science Promotion and the Support of Women in the Engineering Profession Award of Engineers Canada. She was a distinguished lecturer of the Canadian Institute of Mining, Metallurgy and Petroleum in 2018 and 2019. She was the 2020 recipient of the MetSoc Silver Medal Award.

In 2026, Mary Wells was appointed to Order of Ontario.

== Books ==
Wells is the coauthor, with Anne Millar, of two books on women in engineering, Women of Impact in the Canadian Materials, Metallurgy, and Materials Fields (2016), and Women of Innovation: The Impact of Leading Engineers in Canada (2018), published through the Canadian Institute of Mining, Metallurgy and Petroleum.
