= Mahallat =

City in Markazi province, Iran

Mahallat Persian: محلات
- City
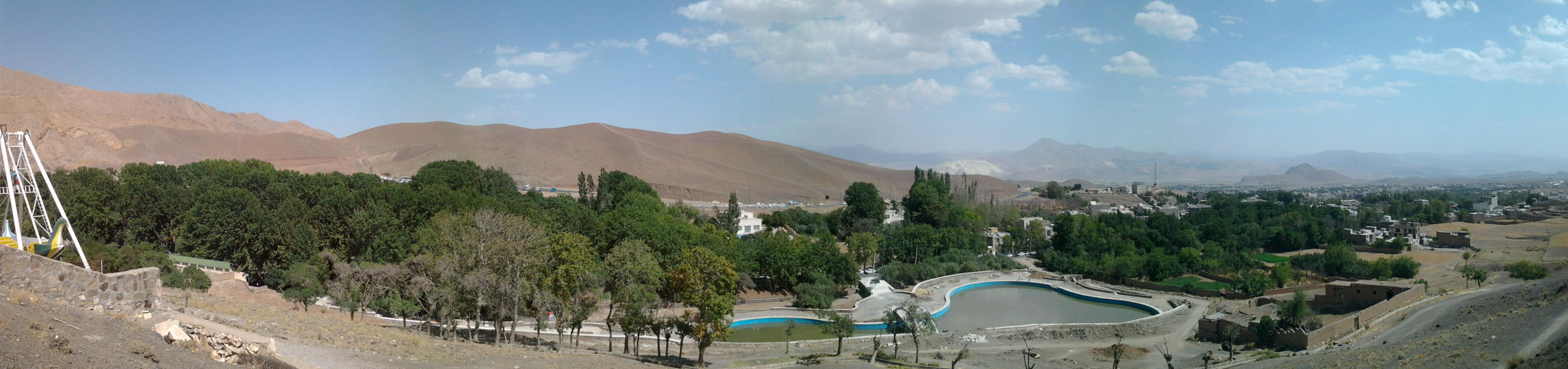

- Location within Iran
- Coordinates: 33°54′20″N 50°27′26″E
- Country: Iran
- Province: Markazi
- County: Mahallat
- District: Central

Population (2016)
  - Total: 50,000
- Time zone: UTC+3:30 (IRST)
- Area code: 086
- Website: mahallat.ir

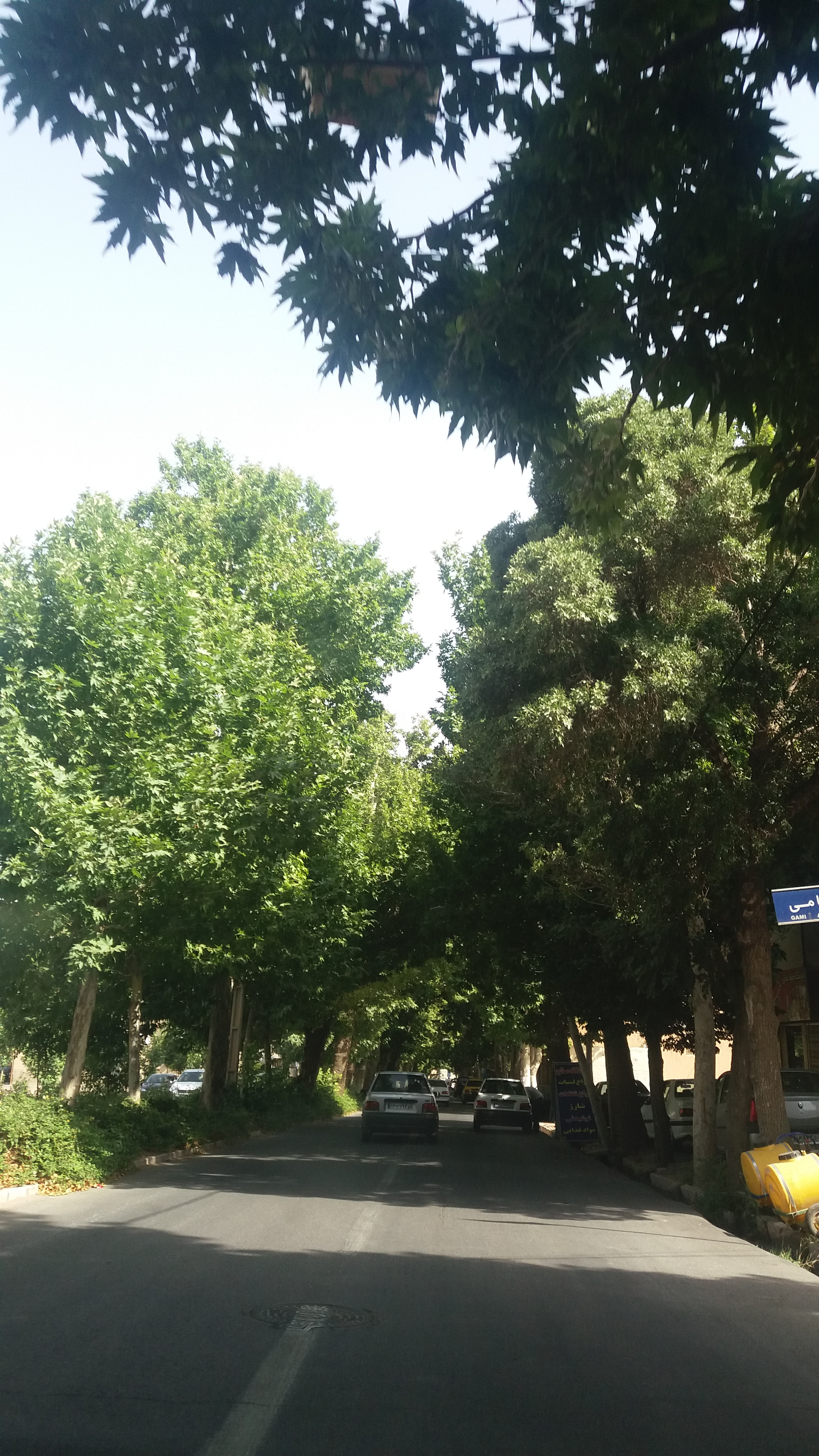
Street in Mahallat - 2016

Mahallat (Persian: محلات) (Note: Also romanized as Maḩallāt; also known as Mahallāt Bāla and Maḩallāt-e Bālā) is a city in the Central District of Mahallat County, Markazi province, Iran, serving as capital of both the county and the district.

== History ==
In ancient times it was an important location for Zoroastrianism. It has a cold climate, and strong winds during spring and summer. The city is one of the major producers and exporters of flowers in Iran. Every September the city holds a flower festival. In addition, the area surrounding the city is rich with travertine deposits, which are refined into tiles in nearby factories.

There are remains of Hellenistic architecture from Alexander the Great's time in Mahallat as well as fire temple ruins dated from the Zoroastrianism era. The city is famous for a large warm water spring flowing from mountains in the North into the plain areas of the South, which are used for agriculture as well as the urban water supply. There are also hot springs not far from the city which have been a source of local tourism since ancient times due to its assumed medical benefits. The dialect spoken in Mahallat is a version of a larger branch of dialects spoken in central Iran (Yazd, Isfahan, Khonsar) with several words having a noticeable connection to old Persian.

Mahallat was formerly divided into three major parts. The northern part was Mahallat-e Bala, the area of the Sadat-e Mahallat, the families descending from the prophet Mohammad. In the middle Mahallat-e Ghaleh, originally a vast open space with fields, but in the 18th century two brothers from Sabzevar and their soldiers and servants built castles and developed the area. The family was later known as Amiri, Amirkhani, Elahi, Majidi, Nasseri, Norouz Nasseri and Khosrovani (Mahallati). The southern part was named Mahallat-e Pain and this was where the Aga Khan built his huge castle.

== Demographics ==
=== Population ===
At the time of the 2006 National Census, the city's population was 35,319 in 10,285 households. The following census in 2011 counted 40,582 people in 12,635 households. The 2016 census measured the population of the city as 43,245 people in 14,266 households.

== Notable people ==
Born in Mahallat were:

- Hajj Sayyah Mahallati, the first Iranian to become a US citizen
- Aga Khan II, a religious leader
- Mohsen Sadr (Sadr ol-Ashraf II), prime minister and senator
- General Parviz Khosrovani, deputy prime minister and founder and first president of the famous Taj Sports Club (Taj Football Club), later known as Esteghlal Football Club.

== See also ==
Media related to Mahallat at Wikimedia Commons

Mahallat travel guide from Wikivoyage
