= Robert A. Varin =

Polish-Canadian scientist

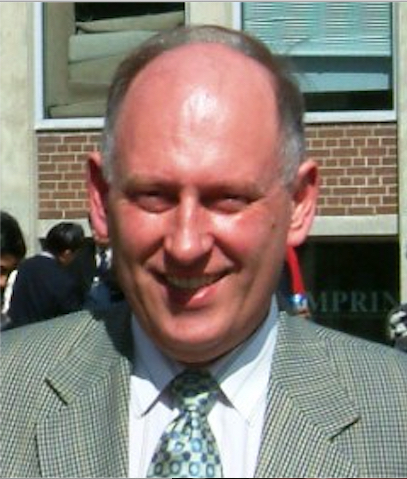
- Prof. Robert A. Varin in 2006
- Born: 1 May 1946; Piastów, Poland
- Education: University of Waterloo; Warsaw University of Technology
- Spouse: Teresa Varin (née Żołądek)
- Children: 2
- Awards: Pro Patria Medal
- Scientific career
- Fields: materials science and engineering
- Workplaces: University of Waterloo; Warsaw University of Technology; University of Manitoba; University of Wollongong; Military University of Technology

Robert Andrzej Varin (born on May 1, 1946 in Piastów, Poland) is a Polish-Canadian scientist, Professor of technical sciences, specialist of materials science and engineering.

== Academic career ==
He studied at the Faculty of Power and Aeronautical Engineering of Warsaw University of Technology (1964-1967) and then (1967–68) at the State Technical School of Thermal Processing. Then he received his master's degree in Metal Science and Heat Treatment (1968-1972), and a Doctorate of Technical Sciences (PhD) in Materials Science and Engineering (1972–76) from the Faculty of Mechanical Engineering and Technology (now Faculty of Production Engineering) at the Warsaw University of Technology. His doctoral dissertation Electron microscopy examination of grain boundary structure in copper was supervised by Prof. Maciej Władysław Grabski. Assistant Professor at the Institute of Materials Science and Engineering, Warsaw University of Technology (1976–78, 1980–82). Postdoctoral fellow in the Department of Mechanical Engineering at the University of Manitoba in Winnipeg (1978–80), and then a research associate there (1982–83). Principal fellow and professorial fellow at the University of Wollongong, Australia (1997, 2003), respectively.

Assistant professor in the Department of Mechanical and Mechatronics Engineering at the University of Waterloo in Canada (1983-1988); associate professor (1988-1992) and full professor (1992-2017) at the University of Waterloo. Hydrogen Storage Laboratory Director (2002-2017). He retired as a professor emeritus in 2018 but remains active professionally. A research collaborator with the Department of Advanced Materials and Technology (Institute of Material Engineering since 2019), Faculty of Advanced Technologies and Chemistry at the Military University of Technology in Warsaw for over 20 years.

In 2010 he was granted the title Professor of Technical Sciences, awarded by the President of the Republic of Poland. Organizer and co-organizer of 10 international scientific conferences. Supervised 11 doctoral dissertations and 21 master's theses.

== Scientific research ==
His principal research interests are relationships between the properties and structures of engineering materials (at the atomic level and resulting from various types of processing), composites, and intermetallic compounds for high-temperature applications i.e. jet engine and power turbines. He is a specialist in materials science and engineering including intermetallics, composites, nanomaterials for solid-state hydrogen storage and superconducting materials, relationships between microstructure and strength, ductility, and fracture at low and high temperatures of metallic and non-metallic materials.

== Selected publications ==
He is the author of over 300 publications including many articles on materials science engineering in international scientific journals. He has to his credit 252 peer-reviewed scientific articles in journals and conference materials in materials engineering. He is an author of 46 peer-reviewed conference abstracts. Author and co-author of:

- Nanomaterials for Solid State Hydrogen Storage (co-author), 2009, ISBN 978-0-387-77712-2,
- Hydrides (author), in: Comprehensive Energy Systems, Chapter 2, Ed. Ibrahim Dincer; Elsevier, Vol. 2, 2018, ISBN 978-0-12-809597-3,
- Progress in Hydrogen Storage in Complex Hydrides, in: Renewable Hydrogen Technologies. Production, Purification, Storage, Applications and Safety (co-author), 2013, ISBN 978-0-444-56352-1,
- Nanostructured Hydrides for Solid State Hydrogen Storage for Vehicular Applications, in: Green Energy-Basic Concepts and Fundamentals (co-author), Ed. Xianguo Li; Springer-Verlag London Limited, 2011, ISBN 978-1-84882-647-2,
- Intermetallics: Crystal Structures, in: Fundamentals of Materials Science–Structure; Encyclopedia of Materials: Science & Technology (author), Elsevier Science Ltd., 2001.

== Editorial and reviewing activities ==
Editor-in-Chief of International Journal of Materials Engineering (since 2012); editor of Bulletin of the Military University of Technology (since 2014); ISRN Materials Science (2011–14), Materials and Manufacturing Processes (2005–07), Applied Sciences (since 2017), Energies (since 2018). A reviewer for 58 international scientific journals, incl. Scripta Materialia, Acta Materialia, Materials Science and Engineering, Polymer Engineering and Science, Metallurgical and Materials Transactions, Intermetallics, Journal of Alloys and Compounds, International Journal of Hydrogen Engineering and 19 international scientific research funding agencies.

Consultant for CRC Press, Natural Sciences and Engineering Research Council, Canadian Aeronautics and Space Institute, Australian Research Council. Certificate of Outstanding Contribution in Reviewing awarded by: Advanced Powder Technology (2013, 2016), Journal of Alloys and Compounds (2017), Intermetallics (2017), International Journal of Hydrogen Energy (2015, 2017).

== Memberships ==
- TMS (The Minerals, Metals & Materials Society) 1982-2017,
- MetSoc (The Metallurgy and Materials Society) 1982-2017,
- ASM (The American Society for Materials) 1983-2017.

== Awards and honors ==
- Golden Cross of Merit by the Polish National Union of Canada (1993),
- Ontario Volunteer Service Award by the Ontario provincial government for 10 years of voluntary service (1996),
- Past Officer's Medal with five bars by the 412 Branch of the Royal Canadian Legion (2005), Life Membership of the Royal Canadian Legion (2015),
- Silver Medal of Merit by the Military University of Technology (2005),
- The Science Technology Transfer Award of the World Association for Innovative Technologies (2011),
- Pro Patria Medal (2018).

== Civic activities ==
In years 1980-81, Chairman of the Executive Committee of the NSZZ Solidarność (Solidarity Trade Union) at the Institute of Materials Science and Engineering of the Warsaw University of Technology. Vice-President (1989–91) and President of the Polish National Union of Canada (1991–97). Vice-Chairman of the Canadian Polish Congress - Kitchener District (1988–89, 2003–05). Vice-Chairman of the Canadian Polish Congress Council (1994–96). Chairman of the Canadian Committee of Movement for the Reconstruction of Poland (1997–98). Chairman of the Committee for the Defense of the Good Name of Poland and Poles at the Canadian Polish Congress - Kitchener District (since 2016). President of the St. Joseph and St. John Cantius Society at Sacred Heart Church in Kitchener for seven terms (2005–19). For six terms (2000-13) a Public Relations Officer of Polish Veterans' Branch 412 of The Royal Canadian Legion, second vice-president (2013-2015), chairman of Honors and Awards Committee (since 2005) and since 2015 its Secretary.

== Private life ==
Son of Robert Varin and Wanda Ciechomska, married to Teresa Żołądek (teacher), father of two daughters: Karolina Joanna (visual artist) and Izabella Maria (nutrition expert).

== Bibliography ==
- Kozak, J.; Piwowarek, T., eds. (2006). Polacy w Kanadzie – Słownik Biograficzny. Mississauga: Biogram Publishing. ISBN 0-9738143-0-6. OCLC 76318337.
- Judyccy, A.Z. (2000). Polonia - Słownik Biograficzny. Warszawa: Wydawnictwo Naukowe PWN SA. ISBN 83-01-13186-1.
- Stachura, Z., ed. (2001). Honorowa Księga Nauki Polskiej - współcześni uczeni polskiego pochodzenia za granicą. Warszawa: CPI. ISBN 83-916278-0-2.
