= James Won-Ki Hong =

South Korean computer scientist (born 1959)

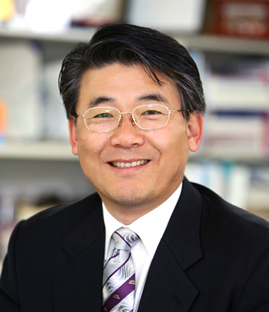
- Born: September 28, 1959 (age 67)
- Scientific career
- Fields: Blockchain, Network Management
- Workplaces: KT / POSTECH

James Won-Ki Hong (born September 28, 1959) is director of Innovation Center for Education (since Nov. 2019), co-director of Center for Crypto Blockchain Research (since Feb. 2020), and professor of computer science and engineering (since May 1995) at POSTECH. He served as dean of graduate of information technology at POSTECH from 2015 to 2019. He was senior executive vice president and CTO of KT Corporation leading R&D activities from 2012 to 2014.

== Education ==
Hong earned an HBSc. in computer science in 1983 and an MS in 1985 from University of Western Ontario. He gained a Ph.D. from the University of Waterloo in 1991.

== Career ==
Hong's research interests include blockchain, network management, network monitoring and network analysis, ICT convergence, ubiquitous computing, and smartphonomics.

He served as chair (2005–2009) of the IEEE Communications Society (IEEE ComSoc), Committee on Network Operations and Management. He has also served IEEE ComSoc Director of Online Content (2004–2005, 2010–2011). He is editor-in-chief of International Journal on Network Management (IJNM) and of ComSoc Technology News. He is the chair of steering committee of IEEE IFIP NOMS International Symposium on Integrated Network Management and Steering Committee member of APNOMS. He was general chair of APNOMS 2006, and General Co-chair of APNOMS 2008 and APNOMS 2011. He was General Co-chair of IEEE/IFIP NOMS 2010. He is an editorial board member of Transactions on Network and Service Management, Journal of Network and Systems Management and Journal of Communications and Networks.

== Professional activities ==
- IEEE Communications Society CNOM - Technical chair (1998–2000), Vice Chair (2003–2005), Chair (2005–2009)
- NOMS 2000, APNOMS'99 - technical program co-chair
- IEEE Transactions on Network and Service Management - Editorial board member (2004–present)
- Journal of Network and Systems Management - Editorial advisory board member (2005–present)
- General Chair APNOMS 2006, General Co-chair APNOMS 2008
- Director of Online Content, IEEE Communications Society (2010–present)
- IEEE NOMS 2010, 2018 - general co-chair
- International Journal of Network Management - Editor-in-chief (2012)
- IEEE Communications Society Technology News -Editor-in-chief (2012)
- National Intelligence Communication Enterprise Association - chairman (2013–2014)
- IEEE Future Directions Committee (FDC) Industry Advisory Board (IAB) - member (2013–2014)
- SDN/NFV Forum - executive director (2014–2018)
- IEEE NetSoft 2016, NOMS 2024 - general chair
- International Conference on Blockchain and Cryptocurrency (ICBC 2019) - General Chair (2019)
- IEEE International Conference on Blockchain and Cryptocurrency - steering committee chair (2022–present)
- International Conference on Blockchain and Cryptocurrency - general co-chair, 2025

Also:

- KNOM Review Journal - editor-in-chief
- ICT Standardization Committee, Telecommunications Technology Association (TTA) - chair
- IEEE NOMS/IM and APNOMS - steering committee member
- IEEE TNSM, JNSM, IJNM, JTM - editorial board member
- TMF University Program (UP) - core team member
- Private Enterprise Advisory Committee of Global Green Growth Institute - member
- EMANICS Scientific Council - member

== Professional experience ==
POSTECH:

- 1995 – present: Professor, computer science and engineering
- 2007 – 2010: Director, POSTECH Information Research Laboratories
- 2007 – 2011, 2015 – 2019: Dean, Graduate School of Information Technology
- 2008 – 2010: Head, computer science and engineering
- 2009 – 2012: Head and professor, IT Convergence Engineering

Other:

- 2000 – 2000: Co-founder and chief software architect, Yute Systems, Pohang, Korea
- 2000 – 2002: Co-founder and chief technology officer, Netstech, Inc., Seoul, Korea
- 2004 – 2005: Visiting professor, electrical and computer engineering, University of Toronto
- 2012 – 2014: CTO and senior executive vice president of KT

== Selected publications ==
- Young J. Won, Mi-Jung Choi, James W. Hong, Chan-Kyu Hwang, and Jae-Hyoung Yoo, "Measurement of Download and Play and Streaming IPTV Traffic Vol. 46, No. 10, p.154–161" IEEE Communications Magazine, October 2008, ISSN 0163-6804
- Young J. Won, Mi-Jung Choi, James Won-Ki Hong, Myung-Sup Kim, Hwawon Hwang, Jun-Hyub Lee, and Sung-Gyoo Lee, "Fault Detection and Diagnosis in IP-based Mission Critical Industrial Process Control Networks," IEEE Communications Magazine, Vol. 46, No. 5, May 2008, pp. 172~180.
- Mi-Jung Choi, Hong-Taek Ju, James Won-Ki Hong and Dong-Sik Yun, "Design and Implementation of Web Services-based NGOSS Technology Specific Architecture," Annals of Telecommunications, Special Issue on 'Next Generation Network and Service Management', Vol. 63, No. 3-4, April 2008, pp. 195~206.
- Byung-Chul Park, Young J. Won, Myung-Sup Kim, and James Won-Ki Hong, "Towards Automated Application Signature Generation for Traffic Identification", 11th IEEE/IFIP Network Operations and Management Symposium (NOMS 2008), Salvador, Bahia, Brazil, April 7 to 11, 2008, pp. 160–167.
- Myung-Sup Kim, Young J. Won, and James W. Hong, "Characteristic Analysis of Internet Traffic from the Perspective of Flows," Computer Communications, Volume 29, Issue 10, June 19, 2006, pp. 1639–1652
- Mi-Jung Choi, Hyoun-Mi Choi, Hong-Taek Ju, and James Won-Ki Hong, "XML-based Configuration Management for IP Network Devices", IEEE Communications Magazine, Vol. 41, No. 7, July 2004. pp. 84–91.
- Other publications searched on Microsoft Academic Search
