= Nimvar =

City in Markazi province, Iran

Nimvar Persian: نیمور
- City
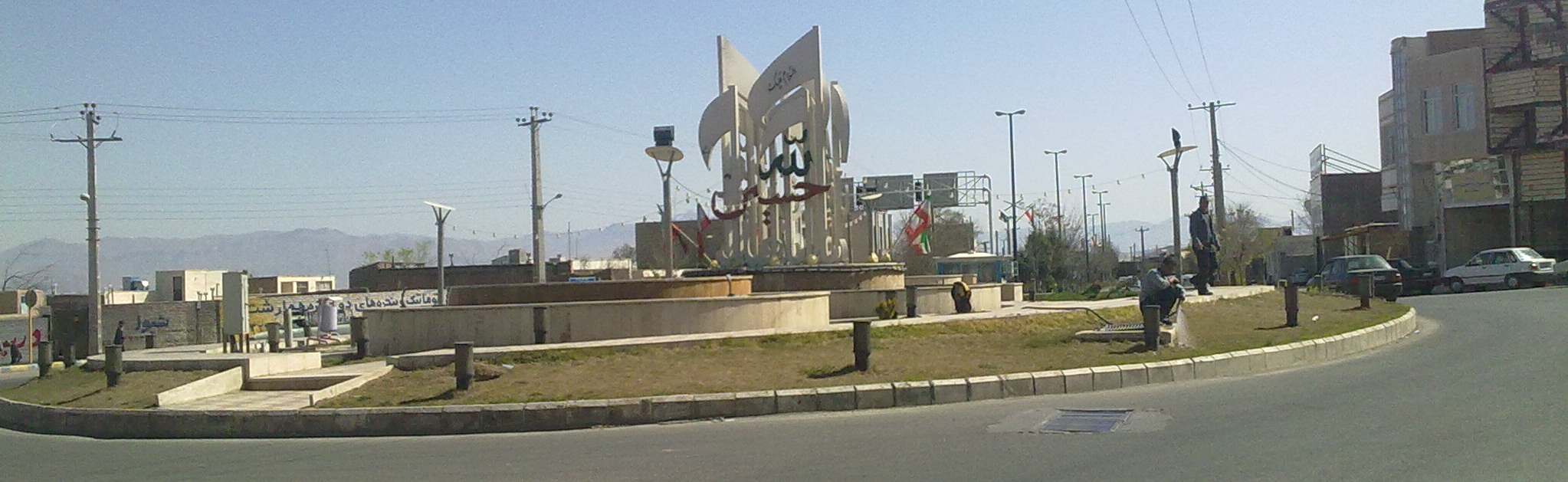
- Main Square of Nimvar

- Location within Iran
- Coordinates: 33°53′04″N 50°34′16″E
- Country: Iran
- Province: Markazi
- County: Mahallat
- District: Central

Population (2016)
  - Total: 7,507
- Time zone: UTC+3:30 (IRST)

Nimvar (Persian: نیمور) (Note: Also romanized as Nīmvar and Nīmwar; also known as Nīmeh Var and Nimehvan) is a city in the Central District of Mahallat County, Markazi province, Iran.

In ancient times Nimvar was an important location for Zoroastrianism. It is one of the ancient cities related to the Sassanid and Ashkanian eras in Iran. Among historical customs that are still alive, and with a history of two thousand years, are the dredging ceremony of Qomrud River and the BilGardani ceremony signifying the harnessing of nature by human beings.

== Demographics ==
=== Population ===
At the time of the 2006 National Census, the city's population was 5,731 in 5,856 households. The following census in 2011 counted 5,856 people in 1,791 households. The 2016 census measured the population of Nimvar as 7,507 people in 2,427 households, by which time the city had annexed the village of Baqerabad.
