= Baqerabad Rural District (Mahallat County) =

Rural district in Markazi province, Iran

Baqerabad Rural District Persian: دهستان باقرآباد
- Rural District
- Location within Iran
- Coordinates: 33°49′N 50°27′E
- Country: Iran
- Province: Markazi
- County: Mahallat
- District: Central
- Established: 1987
- Capital: Nakhjirvan

Population (2016)
  - Total: 3,185
- Time zone: UTC+3:30 (IRST)

Baqerabad Rural District (Persian: دهستان باقرآباد) is in the Central District of Mahallat County, Markazi province, Iran. Its capital is the village of Nakhjirvan. The previous capital of the rural district was the village of Baqerabad, now a neighborhood in the city of Nimvar.

== Demographics ==
=== Population ===
At the time of the 2006 National Census, the rural district's population was 5,118 in 1,481 households. There were 5,382 inhabitants in 1,728 households at the following census of 2011. The 2016 census measured the population of the rural district as 3,185 in 1,124 households. The most populous of its 51 villages was Nakhjirvan, with 848 people.

=== Other villages in the rural district ===
- Amirabad
- Bozi Jan
- Golcheshmeh-ye Bala
- Kuh-e Sefid
- Lorijan
- Mohammadabad
- Yekeh Chah
