= Mahallat County =

County in Markazi province, Iran

Mahallat County Persian: شهرستان محلات
- County
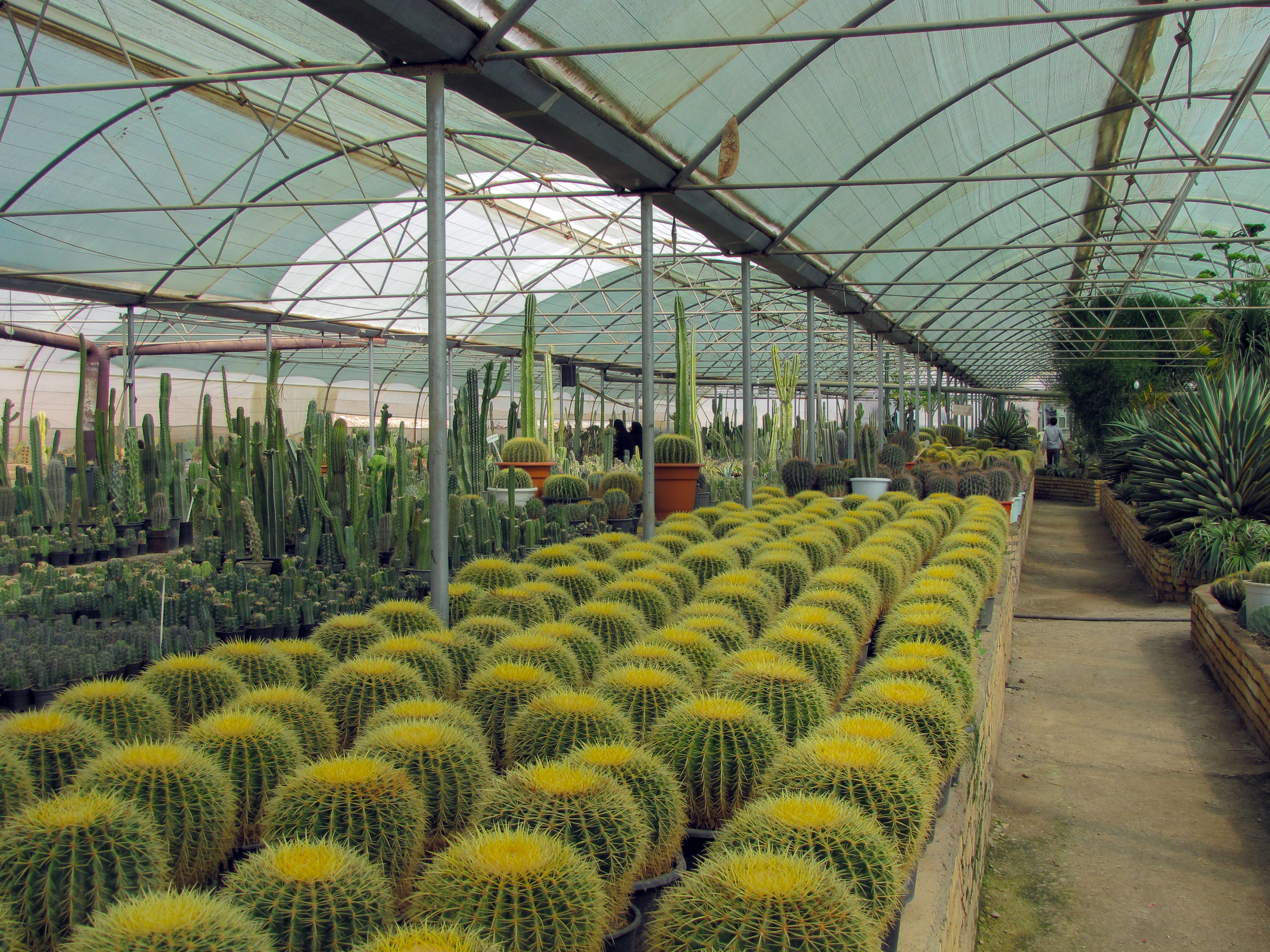
- Greenhouse in Mahallat

- Location of Mahallat County in Markazi province (bottom right, pink)

- Location of Markazi province in Iran
- Coordinates: 33°54′N 50°24′E
- Country: Iran
- Province: Markazi
- Capital: Mahallat
- Districts: Central

Population (2016)
  - Total: 55,342
- Time zone: UTC+3:30 (IRST)

Mahallat County (Persian: شهرستان محلات) is in Markazi province, Iran. Its capital is the city of Mahallat.

== Demographics ==
=== Population ===
At the time of the 2006 National Census, the county's population was 48,458 in 14,139 households. The following census in 2011 counted 53,381 people in 16,749 households. The 2016 census measured the population of the county as 55,342 in 18,436 households.

=== Administrative divisions ===
Mahallat County's population history and administrative structure over three consecutive censuses are shown in the following table.

Mahallat County Population
Administrative Divisions	2006	2011	2016
Central District	48,458	53,381	55,342
Baqerabad RD	5,118	5,382	3,185
Khurheh RD	2,290	1,561	1,405
Mahallat (city)	35,319	40,582	43,245
Nimvar (city)	5,731	5,856	7,507
Total	48,458	53,381	55,342
RD = Rural District

== See also ==
Media related to Mahallat County at Wikimedia Commons
