= Central District (Mahallat County) =

District in Markazi province, Iran

Central District (Mahallat County) Persian: بخش مرکزی شهرستان محلات
- District
- Location within Iran
- Coordinates: 33°54′N 50°24′E
- Country: Iran
- Province: Markazi
- County: Mahallat
- Capital: Mahallat

Population (2016)
  - Total: 55,342
- Time zone: UTC+3:30 (IRST)

The Central District of Mahallat County (Persian: بخش مرکزی شهرستان محلات) is in Markazi province, Iran. Its capital is the city of Mahallat.

== Demographics ==
=== Population ===
At the time of the 2006 National Census, the district's population was 48,458 in 14,139 households. The following census in 2011 counted 53,381 people in 16,768 households. The 2016 census measured the population of the district as 55,342 inhabitants in 18,436 households.

=== Administrative divisions ===
Central District (Mahallat County) Population
Administrative Divisions	2006	2011	2016
Baqerabad RD	5,118	5,382	3,185
Khurheh RD	2,290	1,561	1,405
Mahallat (city)	35,319	40,582	43,245
Nimvar (city)	5,731	5,856	7,507
Total	48,458	53,381	55,342
RD = Rural District
