= David Pontarini =

Canadian architect

Co-Founder of Hariri Pontarini Architects

Personal details
- Education: University of Toronto
- Occupation: Architect

David Pontarini, OAA, AAA, FRAIC, AIA is a Canadian architect and founding partner of Hariri Pontarini Architects in 1994, alongside Siamak Hariri.

Pontarini is a former member of the City of Toronto’s Design Review Panel, the City of Toronto’s Preservation Board, a visiting lecturer at the University of Toronto Faculty of Architecture, Landscape and Design, and a former member of the OAA Council, representing Toronto Centre from 1992 to 2002.

== Honours ==
- Royal Architecture Institute of Canada's (RAIC) 2013 Architectural Firm Award

== Work in Progress ==
- Pinnacle One Yonge, Toronto, Ontario, Canada
- The Well, Toronto, Ontario, Canada
- 19 Duncan Street, Toronto, Ontario, Canada
- PJ Condos, Toronto, Ontario, Canada
- Edmonton Ice District, Edmonton, Alberta, Canada

== Buildings of Note ==
- 2019: Massey Tower, Toronto, Ontario, Canada
- 2019: King Portland Centre and Kingly Condos, Toronto, Ontario, Canada
- 2018: One Bloor, Toronto, Ontario, Canada
- 2018: 7 St. Thomas, Toronto, Ontario, Canada
- 2017: FIVE: Condos at 5 St. Joseph, Toronto, Ontario, Canada
- 2016: Pinnacle on Adelaide, Toronto, Ontario, Canada
- 2013: Shangri-La Toronto, Ontario, Canada
- 1999: McKinsey & Co. Toronto, Ontario, Canada
- 1998: Robertson House Crisis Care Centre, Toronto, Ontario, Canada

== Publications ==
- 2005: "Yorkville Condo Has Historic Link." Toronto Star 23 July 2005
- 2006: Ogilvie, Megan. "New VÜ for ‘Old Town’." Toronto Star 20 May 2006
- 2007: Hume, Christopher. " Some Causes for Concern in Condo Design." Toronto Star 21 April 2007
- 2010: Topping, David, Let’s Gape at One Bloor, Shall we?", Torontoist, April 2010
- 2010: Van de Ven, Lisa, "One Bloor", National Post, April 2010
- 2010: Daily Commercial News, “Work Continues on Shangri-la Toronto hotel and residences.” Construction Overview, June 2010
- 2011: Pontarini talks One Bloor design in Urbantoronto.ca

== See also ==
- Architecture of Toronto
