= Grands Lacs (disambiguation) =

Grands Lacs may refer to

- Great Lakes, a collection of 5 large lakes in the Northeastern United States and Southeastern Canada (French: Grands Lacs d'Amérique du Nord)
  - Great Lakes region, a region of U.S. states and Canadian provinces bordering the North American Great Lakes (French: Région des Grands Lacs)
  - Collège des Grands-Lacs, a francophone Ontario College of Applied Arts and Technology in Toronto
- African Great Lakes, a collection of 11 large lakes in East Africa, (French: Grands Lacs africains)
