= Cy McLean =

Canadian musician (1916–1986)

Cy McLean (1916–1986) was a Canadian pianist and band leader, whose career spanned the 1940s to the 1970s. He is particularly notable as having led Canada's only full-scale black orchestra in the 1940s. His success as a Canadian black musician is considered to have influenced the success of later Canadian black musicians.

== History ==
Cy McLean was born in Sydney, Nova Scotia, and relocated to Toronto, Ontario. He formed his first band as of 1937. He was a pianist, who supported himself as a musician through working as a messenger at the Toronto head office of Bell Canada. He became known as the leader of Toronto's first black dance band and, as of the 1940s, led Canada's only full-scale black orchestra. McLean is credited with training many Canadian jazz musicians of his time. He and his band developed their music career through playing at non-union establishments, due to being unable to join the local musicians union. The band became quite popular, and during World War II was sponsored by Lifebuoy Soap to tour southwestern Ontario. McLean and his band played in areas of Ontario where a black person had not been seen before. He and his band were sometimes barred from restaurants, in addition to being initially denied union membership. Despite these events, McLean chose to perform exclusively in Canada, stating that "people (in Canada) aren't like they are in the United States. I've never wanted to go down there, for that reason."

In 1947, Cy McLean's band was the first to open Toronto's famed Colonial Tavern. This was considered to be a groundbreaking engagement, since black musicians had heretofore not been allowed to perform at any of the clubs on Toronto's Yonge Street, which was at the time the central focus of live music in Toronto.

McLean was a significant influence on other musicians, both generally and among black musicians facing colour barriers, such as drummer Archie Alleyne.

In his later career, McLean was performing five nights a week at Toronto's Warwick Hotel, prior to dance bands being replaced by other entertainment.

McLean was the great-uncle of Canadian drummer Mark McLean.
