= Siamak Hariri =

Canadian architect

Co-Founder of Hariri Pontarini Architects

Personal details
- Born: 1958 Bonn, West Germany
- Education: University of Waterloo; Yale University School of Architecture
- Occupation: Architect

Siamak Hariri, OAA, AAA, AIBC, SAA, NSAA, NLAA, FRAIC, Intl. Assoc. AIA (Persian: سیامک حریری; born 1958) is a Canadian architect and a founding partner of Hariri Pontarini Architects, a full-service architectural firm based in Toronto, Canada.

Born in Bonn, Germany, Hariri was educated at the University of Waterloo (BES, '79) and Yale University (M.Arch, '85). Upon graduation, he worked at firms in New York and Toronto before founding Hariri Pontarini Architects with David Pontarini in 1994. Hariri holds "deep respect for the transformative potential of architecture and specializes in designing works of enduring value" for private and public clients including the Art Gallery of Ontario, Royal Ontario Museum, Princess Margaret Cancer Centre, and St. Michael's Hospital.

Hariri is a member of the Royal Canadian Academy of Arts, sits on the board of the Design Exchange, and has sat on the advisory board of the Royal Ontario Museum's Contemporary Culture (formerly the Institute for Contemporary Culture) and the Toronto Community Foundation. He served as a member of Waterfront Toronto's Design Review Panel from 2005 until 2010. Hariri has also taught studios at the John H. Daniels Faculty of Architecture, Landscape and Design at the University of Toronto. He has been a lecturer, guest critic, and jury member for organizations across North America and Europe.

He lives in Toronto with his wife, artist Sasha Rogers, and their three children.

== Design approach ==
In his TED Talk entitled How do you build a sacred space, Hariri shared that the inspiration behind his practice stems from the emotional response that architecture can create: "The school of architecture that I studied at some 30 years ago happened to be across the street from the wonderful art gallery designed by the great architect Louis Kahn. I love the building, and I used to visit it quite often. One day, I saw the security guard run his hand across the concrete wall. And it was the way he did it, the expression on his face—something touched me. I could see that the security guard was moved by the building and that architecture has that capacity to move you. I could see it, and I remember thinking, 'Wow. How does architecture do that?' At school, I was learning to design, but here—here was a reaction of the heart. And it touched me to the core. You know, you aspire for beauty, for sensuousness, for atmosphere, the emotional response. That's the realm of the ineffable and the immeasurable. And that's what you live for: a chance to try."

Over the past three decades, Hariri has established a reputation as a "sculptor working in architecture." His work reflects a commitment to the essentials of architecture, and to every project he brings "a profound interest in light, form, site, material, and craft." His process begins with hand-sketching to establish the initial conceptual design for a project, which is then refined and developed in an iterative process of additional sketching, physical model studies, and digital renderings.

== Honors ==
Hariri's portfolio has been honored with over 100 national and international design awards, including several Governor General's Medals in Architecture. With founding partner, David Pontarini, the firm received the 2013 Royal Architectural Institute of Canada's Architectural Firm Award.

In 2014, Hariri was named a Fellow of the Royal Architectural Institute of Canada.

For his contributions to architecture in Canada and abroad, Hariri received an honorary Doctor of Architecture from Ryerson University in 2017. In 2024, Hariri received an honorary Doctor of Design from OCAD University.

In 2016, Hariri presented a TED Talk about the Bahá'í Temple of South America that has since garnered over 1.5 million views.

The Globe and Mail listed Hariri as one of Canada's most remarkable artists.

== Notable projects ==
=== McKinsey & Company Toronto Headquarters ===
One of Hariri's earliest commissions, the Canadian headquarters of McKinsey & Company, received a City of Toronto heritage designation just five years after completion. Located at Victoria University in the University of Toronto's campus, the building harmonizes campus planning traditions with innovative office design to establish a culture of collaboration and excellence. The design reimagines the conventional office structure by implementing a new planning model called "The Hive," a dynamic, three-storey gathering space that blends light, form, and material.

=== Schulich School of Business, York University ===
The Governor General's Medal-winning Schulich School of Business for York University was completed in 2003 in joint venture with Robbie/Young + Wright Architects. The 340,000 square foot building, which spans a full city block, integrates an educational facility with luxury residential dwellings in a corporate learning complex. An early example of Hariri's high attention to detail and craftsmanship, the project was the first time the firm used a custom curtain wall system designed in collaboration with the manufacturer.

=== Richard Ivey Building, Western University ===
In 2009, Hariri's design won an international competition as the new home of the Ivey Business School at Western University. The design concept for the building emulates a geode. The research-based design process involved workshops and a survey of top business schools, with careful attention paid to the design of the case study classrooms and breakout rooms essential to Ivey's case method of learning. The project has been recognized with several awards including the 2016 Chicago Athenaeum International Architecture Award, 2016 American Institute of Architects' Educational Facility Design Award of Excellence, and the 2016 Ontario Association of Architects' Lieutenant Governor of Ontario's Award for Design Excellence in Architecture.

=== Bahá'í Temple of South America ===
Hariri was the Partner-in-Charge and lead designer of the acclaimed Bahá'í Temple of South America in Santiago, Chile. Completed in 2016, it is the last of eight continental temples commissioned by the Bahá'í community. Hariri's design was selected through an international design competition with 180 entries from 80 countries. The project is celebrated for its complex design and construction as well as innovations in structure, material, and technology. Following the completion of the temple, Birkhäuser published Embodied Light - Bahá'í Temple of South America, a book that highlights the technological innovation and architectural excellence of the project spanning its 14-year journey.

In 2019, the Temple was the first project by a Canadian firm to win the RAIC International Prize—a biennial award that recognizes a single work of architecture that creates lasting transformation within its societal context. The jury report noted, "The architects resolve a challenging and prescriptive program for a new Bahá'í Temple near Santiago with a powerful form that creates a new landmark - a jewel - in a dramatic natural setting. One juror compared the sight of the temple in the distance to a visitor's first glimpse of Ronchamp, creating a sense of procession and heightened anticipation in the experience of approach and arrival."

Hariri has mentioned that the Temple was "the project of a lifetime," noting his personal connection as a member of the Bahá'í community.

=== Casey House ===
In 2017, Hariri completed the renovation and extension to Casey House, a specialty hospital for people living with and at risk of HIV/AIDS in Toronto. The 'embrace' was the central concept for the design and is reflected in the building's architectural form and home-like user environment. The façade of the new addition consists of an arrangement of tinted glass, brick, and stone, inspired by the AIDS quilt. The project has received a 2018 Governor General's Medal in Architecture, 2018 Ontario Association of Architects' Design Excellence Award, and 2019 AIA/AAH Healthcare Design Award, among others, for its high design and compassionate approach to healthcare.

=== Tom Patterson Theatre, Stratford Festival ===
In 2016, Hariri was invited to participate in a design competition to reimagine the Stratford Festival's Tom Patterson Theatre from a pool of over 50 international architects. His winning design "advances the art and possibility of performance with a building designed to attract, engage and connect." The curvilinear building blends into the riverside setting and blurs the boundary of indoors and out. Naturally lit lobby and lounge areas wrap the intimate, 600-seat auditorium, which features an elongated thrust stage. Upon project completion, Alex Bozikovic, architecture critic of The Globe and Mail wrote, "this facility for the Stratford Festival is a remarkable piece of design, joining technically advanced facilities with some of the most beautifully detailed and well-sited public rooms in the country. It is a rare case in which a Canadian institution demanded excellent design, paid for it, and actually followed through." International acclaim for the project includes a "Best of the Best Award" in Cultural Architecture from the 2021 Architecture MasterPrize. It is also a Regional Finalist for the 2022 Civic Trust Awards.

=== McMichael Canadian Art Collection Redevelopment ===
The McMichael Canadian Art Collection announced in late 2025 that Hariri Pontarini Architects will lead the "once-in-a-generation renewal" of the art museum, which is Canada's only publicly funded art gallery focused on Canadian and Indigenous art. The project aims to "remake the McMichael into a world-class museum for the 21st century—a beacon of accessibility, environmental sustainability and artistic excellence."

== Other completed projects ==
Hariri's body of work focuses on institutional projects and private residences. He was the Partner-in-Charge for the following selection of projects:

- 2026: Dorsay Community & Heritage Centre, Pickering Museum Village, City of Pickering, Greenwood, Ontario, Canada
- 2025: Marianne and Edward Gibson Art Museum, Simon Fraser University, Burnaby, British Columbia, Canada
- 2024: Joan and Martin Goldfarb Gallery, York University, Toronto, Ontario, Canada
- 2023: Riverdale, Lake Joseph, Ontario, Canada
- 2021: Nicol Building, Sprott School of Business, Carleton University, Ottawa, Ontario, Canada
- 2021: BARLO MS Centre, St. Michael's Hospital, Toronto, Ontario, Canada
- 2019: Rankin Family Pavilion, Brock University, St. Catharines, Ontario, Canada
- 2018: Essex Centre of Research, University of Windsor, Ontario, Canada
- 2016: Jackman Law Building, University of Toronto Faculty of Law, Toronto, Ontario, Canada
- 2014: Lake Huron Residence, Lake Huron, Ontario, Canada
- 2011: Michael G. DeGroote School of Medicine, McMaster University, Kitchener, Ontario, Canada
- 2010: Art Gallery of Ontario, The Weston Family Learning Centre, Toronto, Ontario, Canada
- 2010: The Ontario Pavilion for Vancouver 2010 Winter Olympic Games, Vancouver, British Columbia, Canada
- 2009: Max Gluskin House, Department of Economics, University of Toronto, Ontario, Canada
- 2008: University of Waterloo School of Pharmacy, Kitchener, Ontario, Canada
- 2006: Ravine Residence, Toronto, Ontario, Canada
- 2004: Art Collectors' Residence, Toronto, Ontario, Canada
- 2001: MacLaren Art Centre, Barrie, Ontario, Canada
- 1998: Robertson House Crisis Care Centre, Toronto, Ontario, Canada

== Notable press and publications ==
- Villardi, Leopoldo. "A Family Enlists Hariri Pontarini to Realize a Sprawling Lakeside Getaway in Remote Ontario." Architectural Record, October 2025
- Lam, Elsa. "Stage by Stage: Tom Patterson Theatre, Stratford, Ontario." Canadian Architect, November 2021
- Immen, Wallace. "Carleton's new business school embodies intimacy and belonging." The Globe and Mail, September 2021
- Novakovic, Stefan. "A Thousand Moments of Care: Siamak Hariri on Creating Healing Spaces." AZURE, April 2021
- Bozikovic, Alex. "Stratford's new Tom Patterson Theatre deserves a standing ovation." The Globe and Mail, October 2020
- Lam, Elsa. "Editorial: Crafting a Jewel." Canadian Architect, December 2019
- Novakovic, Stefan. "Coming Home: Case House, Toronto, Ontario." July 2018
- "Extension of a Medical Centre: Casey House." The Plan, April 2018
- "Embodied Light: The Baha'i Temple of South America." Birkhauser Publishing, 2018
- Bozikovic, Alex. "A hospital shows the medicinal power of light, beauty and dignity." The Globe and Mail, October 2017
- Lewsen, Simon. "How a Toronto Firm Took on the Architecture World and Won." Sharp Magazine, July 2016
- Weder, Adele. "Ivey League Ideals." Canadian Architect, July 2014
- Hariri, Siamak. "Falling Backwards: The Design Process Unveiled." Practices (Journal of the Centre for the Study of Practice), Spring 2006
- Kelmans, Marsha. "Temple of Light." Canadian Architect, May 2004
