= 197 Yonge Street =

Historical property in Ontario, Canada

Coordinates: 43.653278°N 79.379295°W

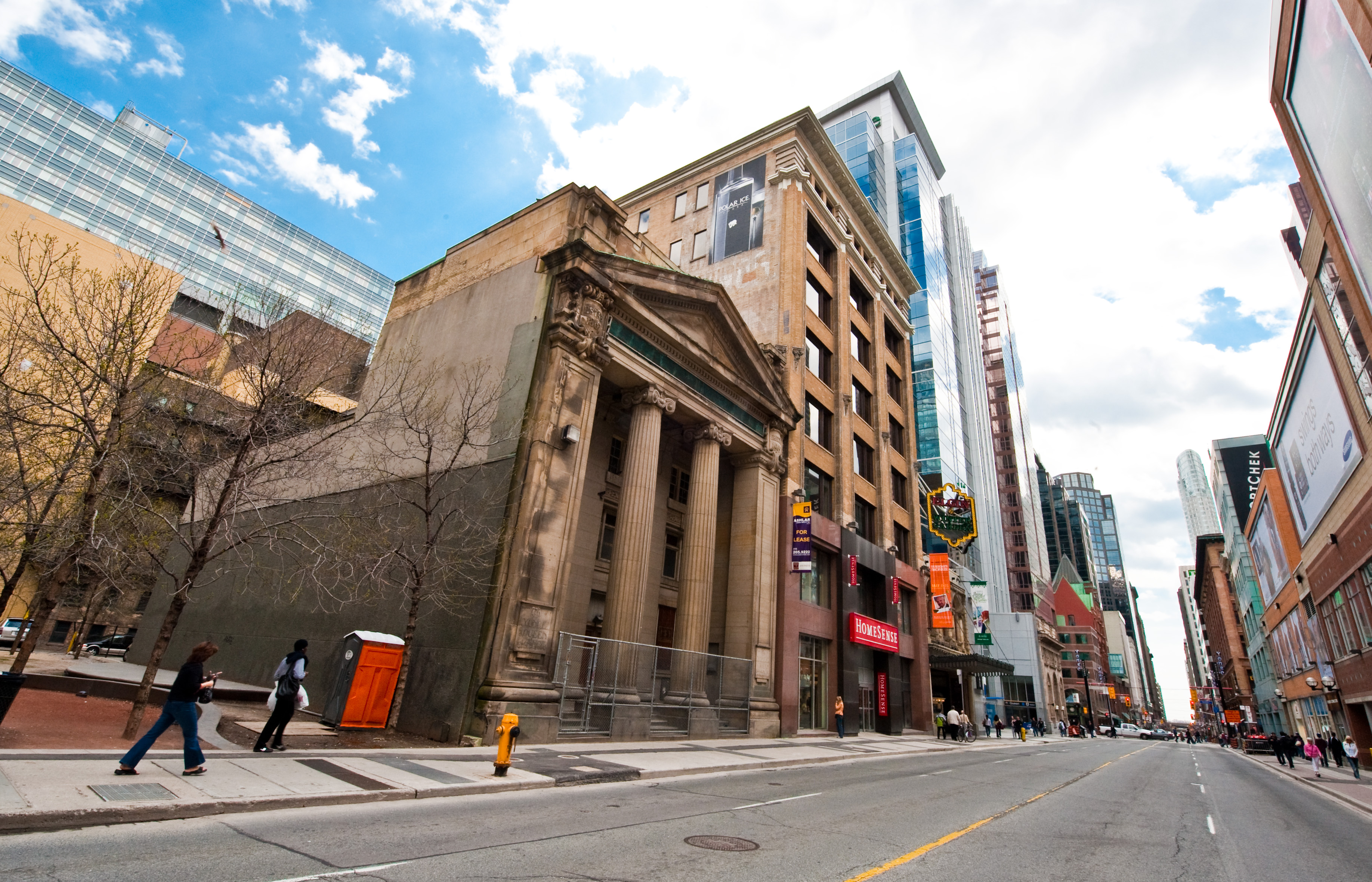
197 Yonge Street, former Canadian Bank of Commerce branch

The historic building at 197–199 Yonge Street was formerly a four-floor Canadian Bank of Commerce building built in 1905 by architects Darling and Pearson and declared as a historical property by the City of Toronto, Ontario, Canada in 1974. The bank left the building in 1987. The bank address was 199 Yonge Street, the numbers still showing above the entrance. Next door at 205 Yonge Street is another historic site. The gap between the two sites was once the Colonial Tavern, demolished in the 20th century. It has been refurbished with 17,423 square feet (1,619 m^{2}) of space. 197 Yonge Street was preserved and became part of the Massey Tower project.
