= Stewart Building =

Building in Toronto, Ontario, Canada

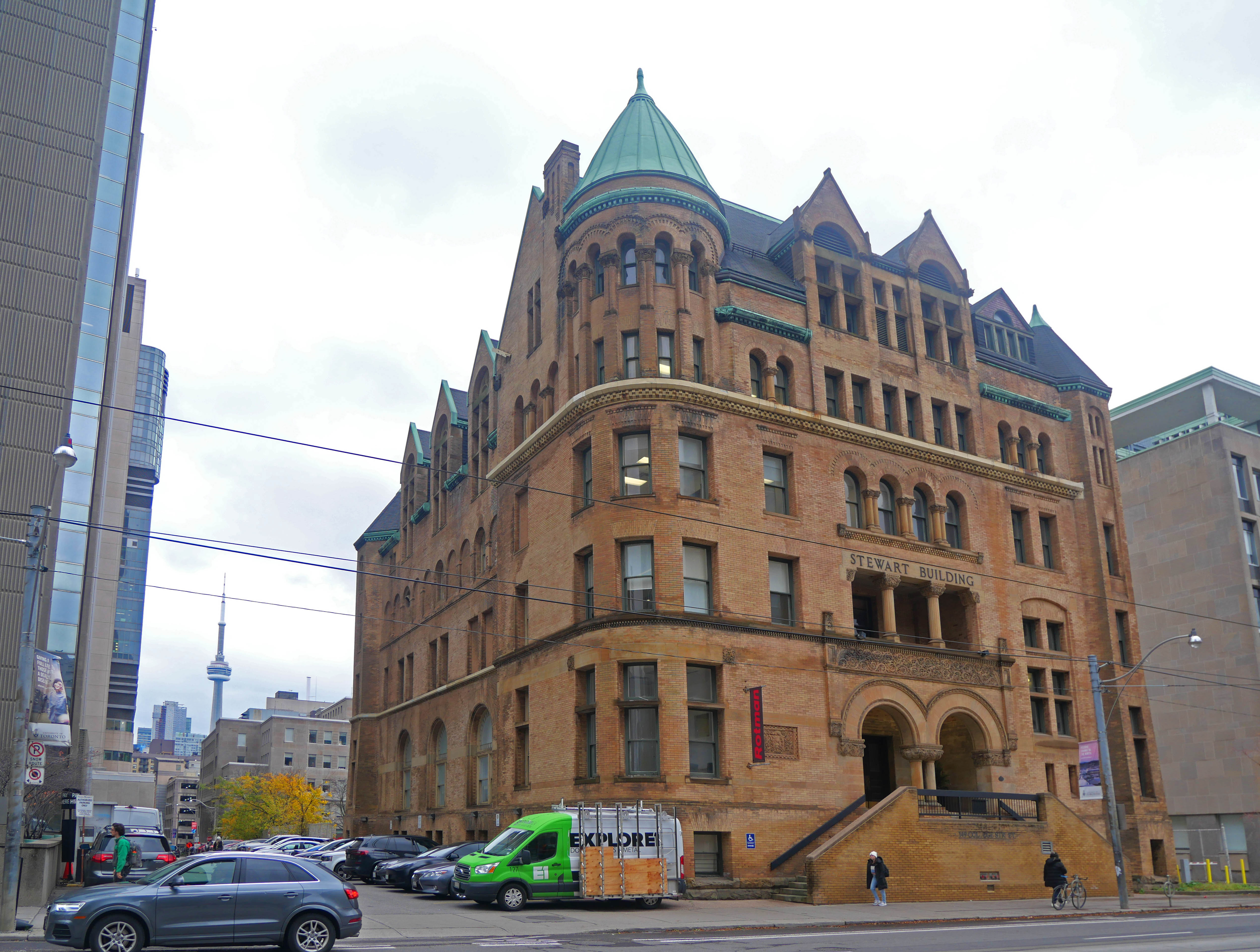
- The building in 2023
- Former names: Toronto Athletic Club

General information
- Architectural style: Richardsonian Romanesque
- Location: 149 College Street, Toronto, Ontario, Canada
- Coordinates: 43.65925°N 79.39197°W
- Named for: William James Stewart
- Completed: 1894
- Owner: University of Toronto

Design and construction
- Architect: E. J. Lennox

Other information
- Public transit: Queen's Park; 506

Ontario Heritage Act
- Designated: 1978

The Stewart Building, formerly known as the Toronto Athletic Club, is a historic building located at 149 College Street in Toronto, Ontario, Canada. It was designed by E. J. Lennox and built in 1894 to support the activities of the club; it included the first indoor pool in Toronto. A similarly named but unaffiliated Toronto Athletic Club now exists in the Toronto-Dominion Centre.

Since 2008, it has been used by the University of Toronto, including some programs of the Rotman School of Management.

== Building ==
The building was designed in a Richardsonian Romanesque style favoured by Lennox. Its exterior is sandstone, a material that Lennox used in other buildings in Toronto, such as the Old City Hall and the Ontario Legislative Building at Queen's Park, nearby. An indoor pool was built in the basement but was filled in when the building first became a school.

The building is approximately 4,000 square metres (43,000 ft^{2}) in size. Including the land, the building cost $128,873 to construct, and a further $15,000 was spent on equipment.

== History ==
The building was built as a result of the efforts of John Beverley Robinson, an amateur boxer, mayor of Toronto and Lieutenant Governor of Ontario. Robinson was the president of the Toronto Athletic Club organization when it built the building, and he served as its president until 1895. The building is on the site of a former home of Robinson.

The building served as the Toronto Athletic Club until 1899, when possession of the building was lost due to foreclosure when the club was in financial difficulty and ceased operations. After the demise of the club, a new Toronto Amateur Athletic Club was formed, but operated in a different location.

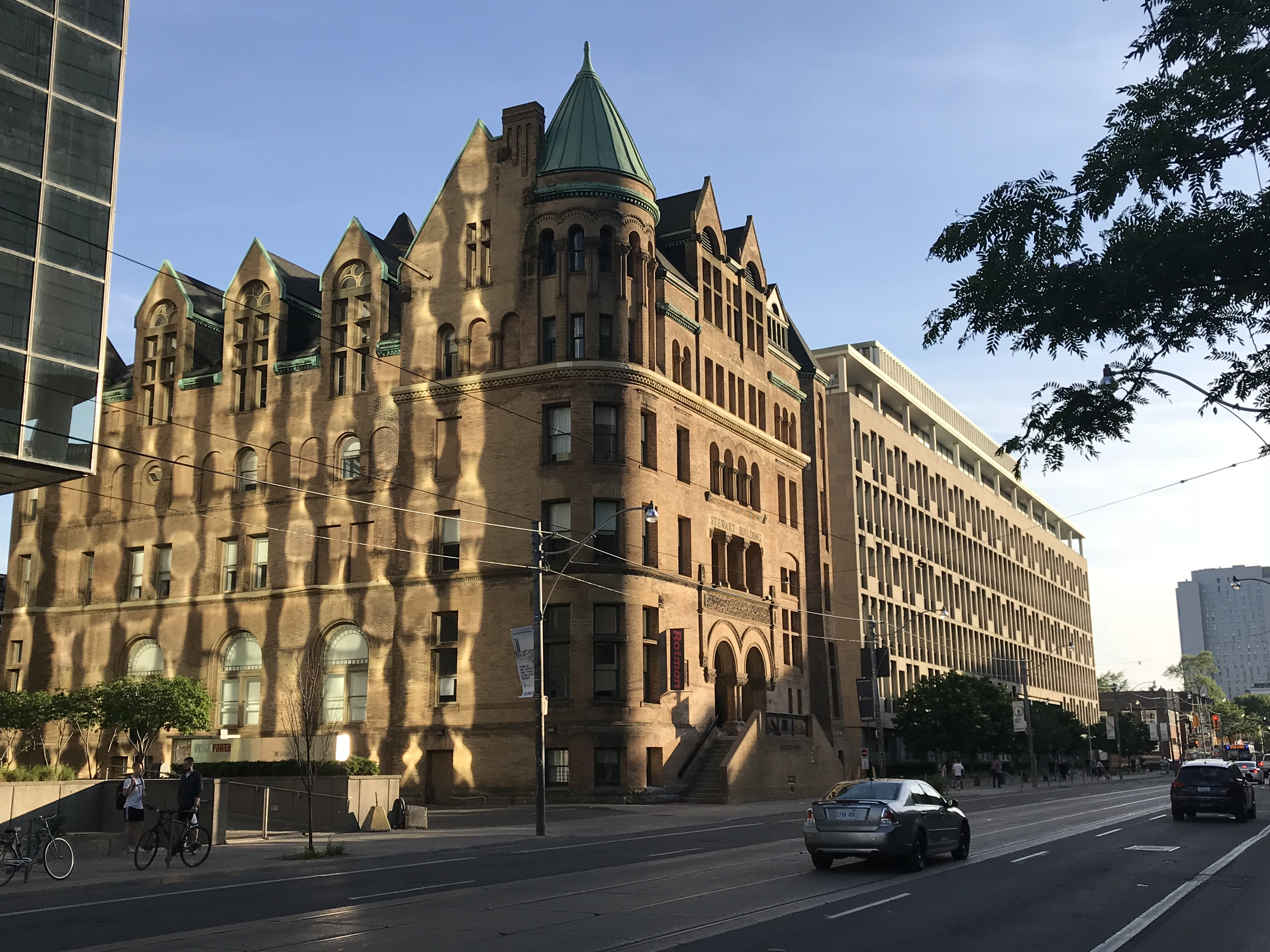
The building in 2018

The City of Toronto purchased the building as the new home of the Toronto Technical School. When the school moved in 1915, 149 College became a military building until 1931 when it was converted to municipal use housing Toronto Police Headquarters and the Department of Public Welfare. The building was subsequently named the Stewart Building after Mayor William James Stewart.

When police headquarters moved to a building on King Street in 1960, the building became the home of 52 Division of the Metropolitan Toronto Police, until the division moved to its new building on Dundas Street in 1977. In 1978, it was designated under the Ontario Heritage Act on grounds of architectural and historic significance.

The building was then sold to the Ontario College of Art in 1979, becoming its second campus until 1997. It then served as the home of the Collège des Grands-Lacs from 1999 to 2001. Since 2008, it has been used by the University of Toronto, including some programs of the Rotman School of Management.

== See also ==
- List of historic places in Toronto
- List of University of Toronto buildings
