= Artists' Alley =

Mixed-use development in Toronto, Canada

General information
- Status: Completed
- Type: Mixed-use (residential, retail and office)
- Location: Downtown Toronto, 234 Simcoe Street / 121 St. Patrick St, Toronto, Ontario, Canada
- Coordinates: 43.65357°N 79.38944°W
- Groundbreaking: 12 September 2018
- Construction started: 2019
- Topped-out: 2023
- Completed: 2025
- Opened: 2025

Height
- Height: 121.91 m (400.0 ft) (39 storeys); 111.86 m (367.0 ft) (35 storeys); 59.13 m (194.0 ft) (17 storeys)

Technical details
- Floor count: 39, 35 and 17
- Floor area: 900,000 sq ft (84,000 m^{2}) (Note: 900,000 sq ft (84,000 m^{2}) is including all three structures)

Design and construction
- Architecture firm: Hariri Pontarini Architects
- Developer: Lanterra Developments
- Structural engineer: Jablonsky, Ast & Partners
- Other designers: Studio Munge (interior); NAK Design Strategies (landscape)
- Main contractor: Lanterra Construction Management

Other information
- Number of units: 899
- Parking: 322 spaces
- Public transit: St. Patrick station (Line 1 Yonge–University)

Website
- artistalleycondos.com

Artists' Alley is a mixed-use complex of three towers in Downtown Toronto, Ontario, Canada. The towers have 39, 35 and 17 storeys and were developed by Lanterra Developments and designed by Hariri Pontarini Architects. The complex contains 899 residential units, retail and office space, and a public park. It stands south of Dundas Street between St Patrick Street and Simcoe Street, near St. Patrick station on Line 1 Yonge–University. The architects list it as completed in 2025.

== History ==
The complex replaced a low-rise office building. Site clearing finished in February 2019, and shoring work began.

Lanterra hired Richan Art in 2019 to prepare a public art plan for city approval, in consultation with neighbours, OCAD University, the Grange Community Association and the ward councillor. In November 2022 it announced that British artist Ryan Gander had been chosen. The project was then described as three towers of 39, 35 and 18 storeys, with occupancy targeted for May 2024. By March 2024 all three towers had topped off.

== Architecture ==
The three towers are 121.91 m, 111.86 m and 59.13 m tall. The architects say the different heights ease the transition between the larger scale of the university area to the east and the smaller scale to the west. The plan was revised to add a park at the south-west corner and to improve the pedestrian connection through the middle of the block. Studio Munge designed the interiors and NAK Design Strategies the landscape.

The 39-storey tower is the plainest of the three, with a grey precast podium and dark aluminum cladding above. The 35-storey tower is curved and has a decorative lattice of diagonal members that carries no load. The 17-storey tower is split by a void, and its southern volume cantilevers outward. The engineering of the towers' foundations and cantilevers required specially designed concrete mixes.

== Public space and art ==
A pedestrian walkway lined with retail runs between two of the towers. It connects St Patrick Street to Simcoe Street, extends a path toward St. Patrick station, and leads into a public park of about 1,000 m^{2} (11,000 sq ft). Gander's The Cat, the Clock and the Rock, a six-foot sculpture and his first permanent work in Canada, was planned for the walkway and was to be finished in 2024.

== Reception ==
The project won the structural engineering award at the 2024 Ontario Concrete Awards. BlogTO listed the 39-storey tower tenth among the ten tallest buildings completed in Toronto in 2025. In a separate list it ranked the complex fourth of five best new buildings of the year, contrasting its design with the cheaper cladding on many condo towers and pointing to the lattice bracing on one tower.

== See also ==
- List of tallest buildings in Toronto
