= Collège Boréal =

Francophone college in Ontario, Canada

Collège Boréal d’arts appliqués et de technologie
- Motto: Nourrir le savoir; faire vibrer la culture
- Motto in English: "Nurture knowledge; Make culture flourish"
- Type: College of applied arts and technology
- Established: 1995
- Academic affiliations: ACUFC, CICan
- President: Daniel Giroux
- Students: 9,155 in 2012–2013 (2025: 1,125 FTEs)
- Location: 21 Lasalle Boulevard; Sudbury, Ontario, Canada; P3A 6B1; 46°31′2.02″N 80°59′35.88″W
- Campus: Across Ontario
- Language: French
- Colours: Black & white
- Nickname: Vipères
- Sporting affiliations: OCAA, CCAA
- Website: www.collegeboreal.ca

Collège Boréal d’arts appliqués et de technologie is a French-language college of applied arts and technology serving the Northern and Central Southwestern Ontario area. It is the youngest of the 24 Colleges of Applied Arts and Technology. Located in Sudbury, Ontario, Canada, Collège Boréal has a total of 42 access centres across 28 cities in the province, including main campuses in Hamilton, Hearst, Kapuskasing, London, Nipissing, Sudbury, Timmins, Toronto, Welland, and Windsor. Collège Boréal began its operations in 1995 as a postsecondary institution. The students are offered technical programs that helps them gain access to a bilingual labour market. In 2002, Collège Boréal opened a campus in Toronto, taking over the programs and services of the defunct Collège des Grands-Lacs. In 2012, the Toronto campus moved to One Yonge Street, and in 2023 to 60 Distillery Lane in the Distillery District in Toronto.

== Presidents ==
Daniel Giroux is the current president of the college. Daniel Giroux was previously the vice president of workforce and business development at Collège Boréal and succeeded Pierre Riopel in 2016. Pierre Riopel succeeded Denis Hubert-Dutrisac, who retired in 2013. Hubert-Dutrisac succeeded Gisèle Chrétien in 2006, when she was appointed president of the French-language television channel TFO.

Date	Description
1994 - 1998	Jean Watters
1998 - 2006	Gisèle Chrétien
2006 - 2013	Denis Hubert-Dutrisac
2013 - 2016	Pierre Riopel
2016–present	Daniel Giroux

== Programs ==
Collège Boréal offers 78 postsecondary and apprenticeship programs in its five schools; the School of Health Sciences, the School of Trades and Applied Technologies, the School of Arts, the School of Advancement, and the School of Business and Community Services.

== Residences ==
The residences comprise 70 units, housing 138 students.

== Facilities ==
Besides its campuses and access centres, Collège Boréal has facilities with varied educational objectives in a number of activity sectors. Health sciences, trades, culinary arts, community services and environmental technologies are among the main fields of expertise.

In 2007, the second floor of the main building of the college became the official home of the Minshall Museum. A gift from the family of the late Aubrey Minshall, this collection of naturalized animals is useful for students in the Natural Resources programs.

In 2009, the Xstrata Nickel Biodiversity Applied Research Centre was opened at the main campus in Sudbury. With a production capacity of 500,000 trees per year, the centre contributes to the effort of regreening Greater Sudbury as well as the mining businesses in the northern part of the province. Since 2011, a 2,100-acre experimental forest was added, providing more field experience to students in the forestry programs.

In 2010, the Louis-Riel Centre was opened; its mission is to offer a broad range of services to aboriginal students. Various workshops and shows are presented every year, such as the Aboriginal Pride Nights that hosted artists Florent Vollant and Elisapie Isaac in 2013.

In 2011, the college opened a new restaurant, Au pied du rocher, allowing the students of the culinary arts to serve to the public. The program is run in partnership with Niagara College's Canadian Food and Wine Institute.

In 2012, Collège Boréal opened a new campus in the heart of Toronto at One Yonge Street. The same year a new 358-seat concert hall also opened its doors to the great delight of art and culture lovers in Greater Sudbury. Furthermore, since 1997, the Sudbury theatre production centre, the Théâtre du Nouvel-Ontario (TNO), has been housed on the main campus in Sudbury.

== Partnerships ==
Collège Boréal has over 250 business and community partners across its territory. Through its network of access centres, Collège Boréal provides continuing education, employment services, immigrant integration and other social programs in Barrie, Brampton, Capreol, Chelmsford, Coniston, Dowling, Elliot Lake, Garson, Greater Sudbury, Hamilton, Hearst, Kapuskasing, Leamington, Lively, London, Mississauga, Sturgeon Falls, Noëlville, North Bay, New Liskeard, Scarborough, Smooth Rock Falls, Timmins, Toronto, Val-Caron, Welland and Windsor.

Over the years, Collège Boréal has also signed 27 articulation agreements with nine Canadian universities to facilitate the graduation process of its qualified graduates.

At the international level, the college has many partnerships with institutions in other countries – in particular with Costa Rica – for a broader transmission of expertise through various assistance and technical training programs.

== Sports ==
Collège Boréal is a member of the Ontario Colleges Athletic Association (OCAA), Canadian Colleges Athletic Association (CCAA). Les Vipères, the Collège team competes in four different sports: badminton, golf, hockey and volleyball.

== See also ==
- Higher education in Ontario
- List of colleges in Ontario
