= 205 Yonge Street =

Coordinates: 43.653584°N 79.379512°W

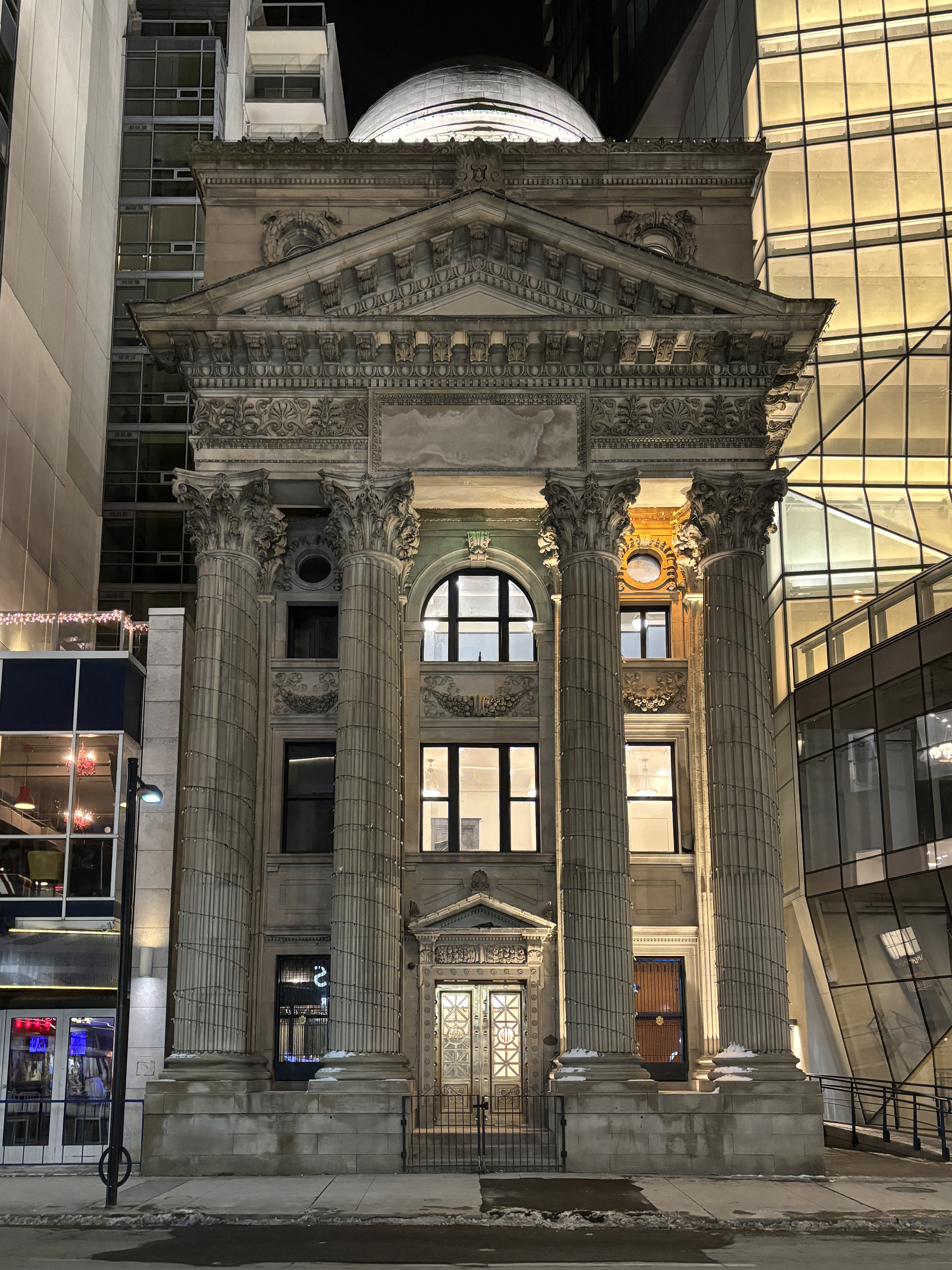
205 Yonge Street at night

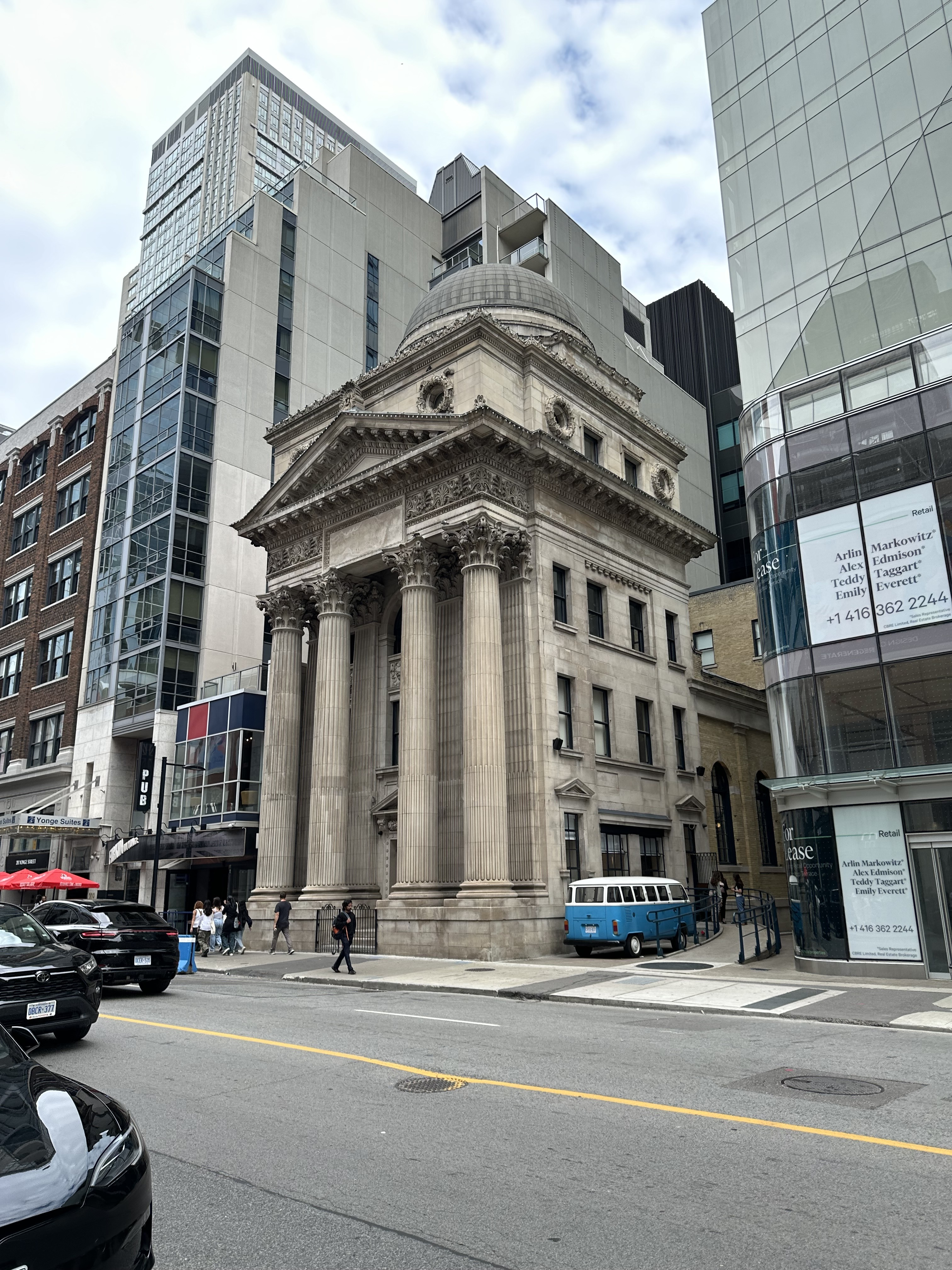
205 Yonge Street in July 2024

205 Yonge Street was formerly a four-story Bank of Toronto building built in 1905 in Toronto, Ontario, Canada. It was designated under the Ontario Heritage Act in 1975. The E. J. Lennox-designed structure has a domed roof and Corinthian columns on the front, and it is an example of neoclassical architecture.

The building is currently closed to the public, and it has been in the process of being refurbished, with 17,423 square feet (1,618.6 m^{2}) of space. As of April 2019, the property is for sale.

Next door at 197 Yonge Street is another historic building. The gap between the two sites was once the Colonial Tavern, which was closed in the 1970s and demolished. The two buildings are located on the east side of Yonge Street, across from the Toronto Eaton Centre, and a few feet north of the Elgin and Winter Garden Theatres.

205 Yonge was once home to the Toronto Historical Board, a city agency that was in charge of protecting historic sites in Toronto. It left the building in 1998 when the agency was revamped into Heritage Toronto. Heritage Toronto's logo is based on the profile of this building.
