= Santiago Bahá'í Temple =

Baháʼí House of Worship in Peñalolen, Santiago, Chile

Santiago Baháʼí Temple
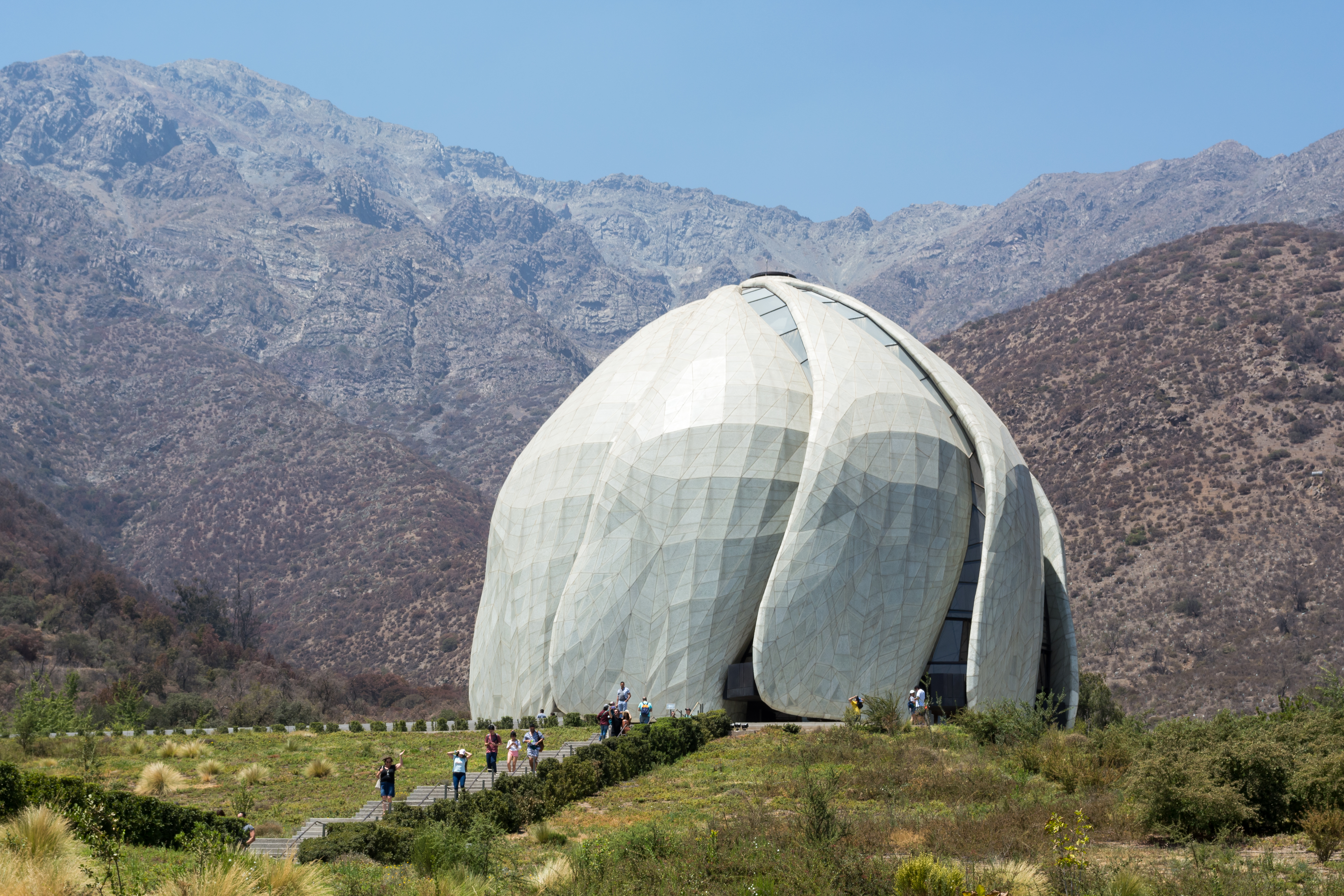

General information
- Type: Baháʼí House of Worship
- Location: Santiago, Chile
- Coordinates: 33.472222°S 70.509167°W
- Completed: October 2016

Height
- Height: 30 metres (98 ft)

Dimensions
- Diameter: 30 metres (98 ft)

Design and construction
- Architect: Siamak Hariri

Other information
- Seating capacity: 600

Website
- templo.bahai.cl

The Santiago Baháʼí House of Worship, also known as the Santiago Baháʼí Temple, is a Baháʼí House of Worship located in Santiago, Chile. Designed by Siamak Hariri, it was inaugurated in 2016 and serves as the continental temple for South America. As with all Baháʼí Houses of Worship, it is open to people of all faiths and backgrounds.

== History ==
In 1953, Shoghi Effendi, then head of the Baháʼí Faith, designated Chile as the site for the continental House of Worship for South America.

In 2001, the Universal House of Justice announced that efforts should begin to construct the «Mother Temple of South America». Later, in 2002, the National Spiritual Assembly of the Baháʼís of Chile launched a design competition for the temple, to be built southeast of Santiago. The winning design was submitted by Canadian firm Hariri Pontarini Architects.

Fabrication of components began in 2007. The construction phase started in November 2010, with the installation of the cast glass cladding commencing in October 2014. Construction was completed in October 2016. The temple was dedicated on October 13, 2016, and doors opened to the public on October 19, 2016.

According to the Baháʼí World News Service, the Santiago House of Worship had received over 40,000 visitors by December 6, 2016. On November 6, 2019, the same source reported that more 1.4 million people had visited the temple. In 2024, it was reported that that number went up to 2.5 million visitors since its opening.

== Architecture ==
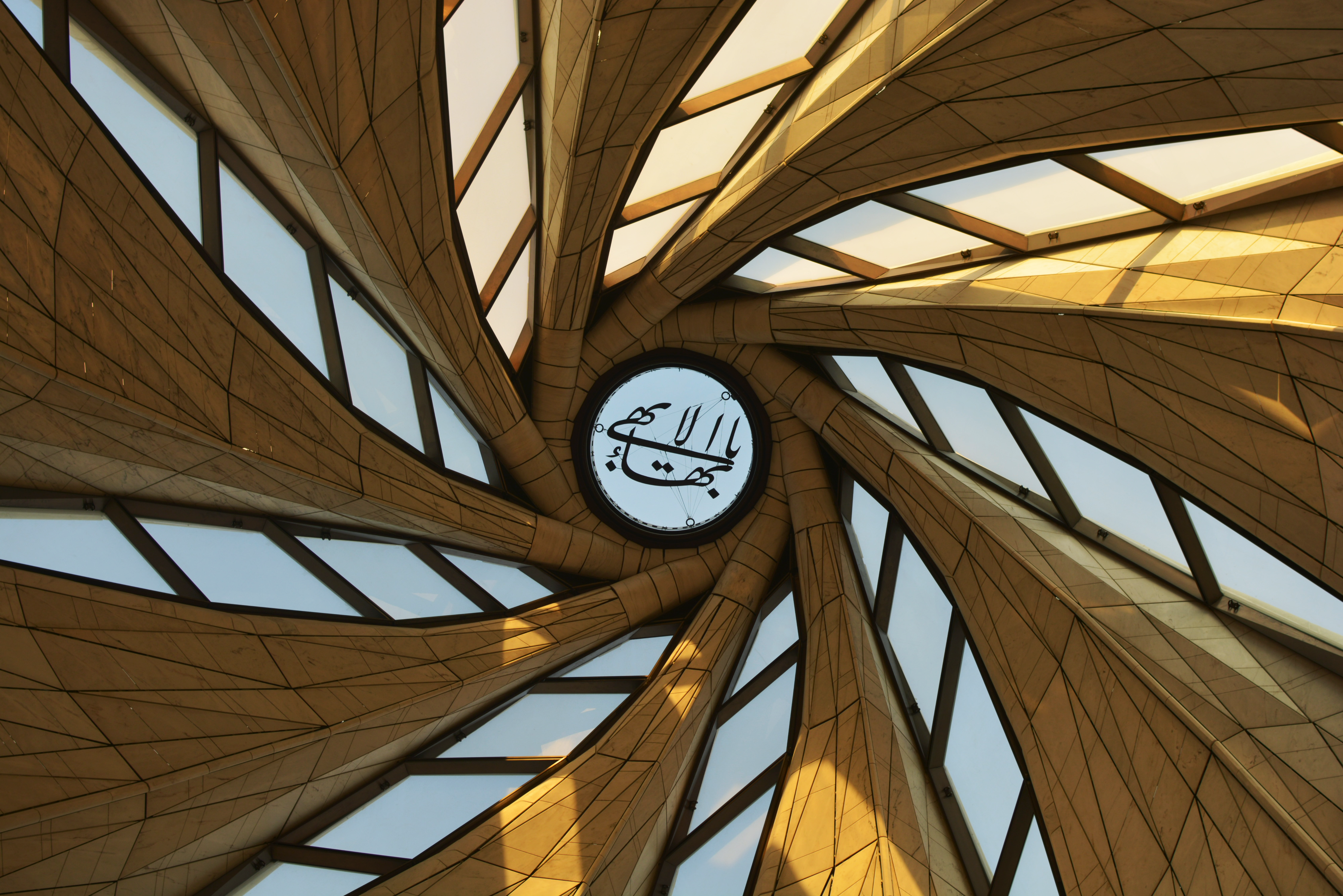
«Petals» seen from the interior

All Baháʼí Houses of Worship are circular and nine-sided. Accordingly, the Santiago temple features nine entrances, nine pathways, and nine fountains, and its structure consists of nine arching «sails».

These elements have also been described as nine «petals», giving the temple a floral appearance. The «petals» are separated by panes of glass that allow natural light to illuminate the interior. The exterior of the «petals» are clad in cast glass, while the interior surfaces are lined with Portuguese marble. The structure is supported by a steel and aluminum superstructure. The temple accommodates up to 600 people and measures 30 metres in both height and diameter.

== Function and use ==
The Baháʼí Faith teaches that a House of Worship should be a space for people of all religions to gather, reflect, and worship. As with all Baháʼí Houses of Worship, the Santiago temple is open to all, regardless of religious background, gender, or other distinctions. The sacred writings of the Baháʼí Faith, as well as those of other religions, may be read or chanted within the temple. Choirs may perform musical renditions of prayers and readings, but the use of musical instruments is not permitted inside.

There is no fixed format for worship services, and ritualistic ceremonies are not allowed. Despite the availability of these temples, most Baháʼí gatherings worldwide take place in private homes, local Baháʼí centres, or rented venues. The Santiago temple serves as the continental House of Worship for South America and was the last of the continental temples to be completed.

== Awards ==
- International Architecture Award from the Chicago Athenaeum, 2017
- Innovation in Architecture Award from the Royal Architectural Institute of Canada, 2017
- Innovation Award (category: Stellar Design) from the American Institute of Architects, 2017
- American Architecture Prize (category: Architectural Design / Cultural Architecture), 2017
- Design Excellence Award from the Ontario Association of Architects, 2018
- Award for «Best in Americas, Civil Buildings» from World Architecture News, 2018
- Structural Award from the Institution of Structural Engineers, 2019
- International Prize from the Royal Architectural Institute of Canada, 2019

== Gallery ==
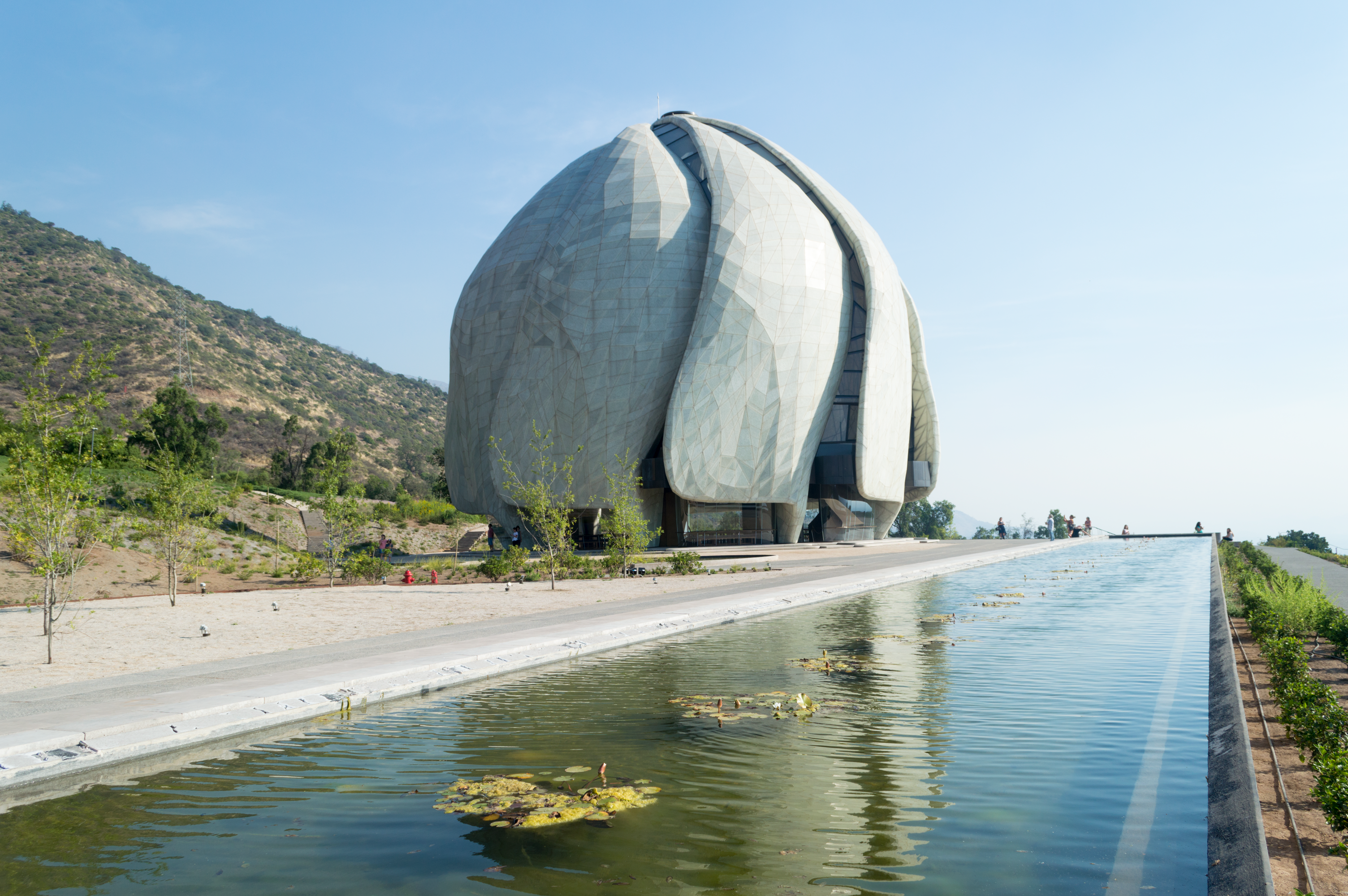
Exterior showing water feature

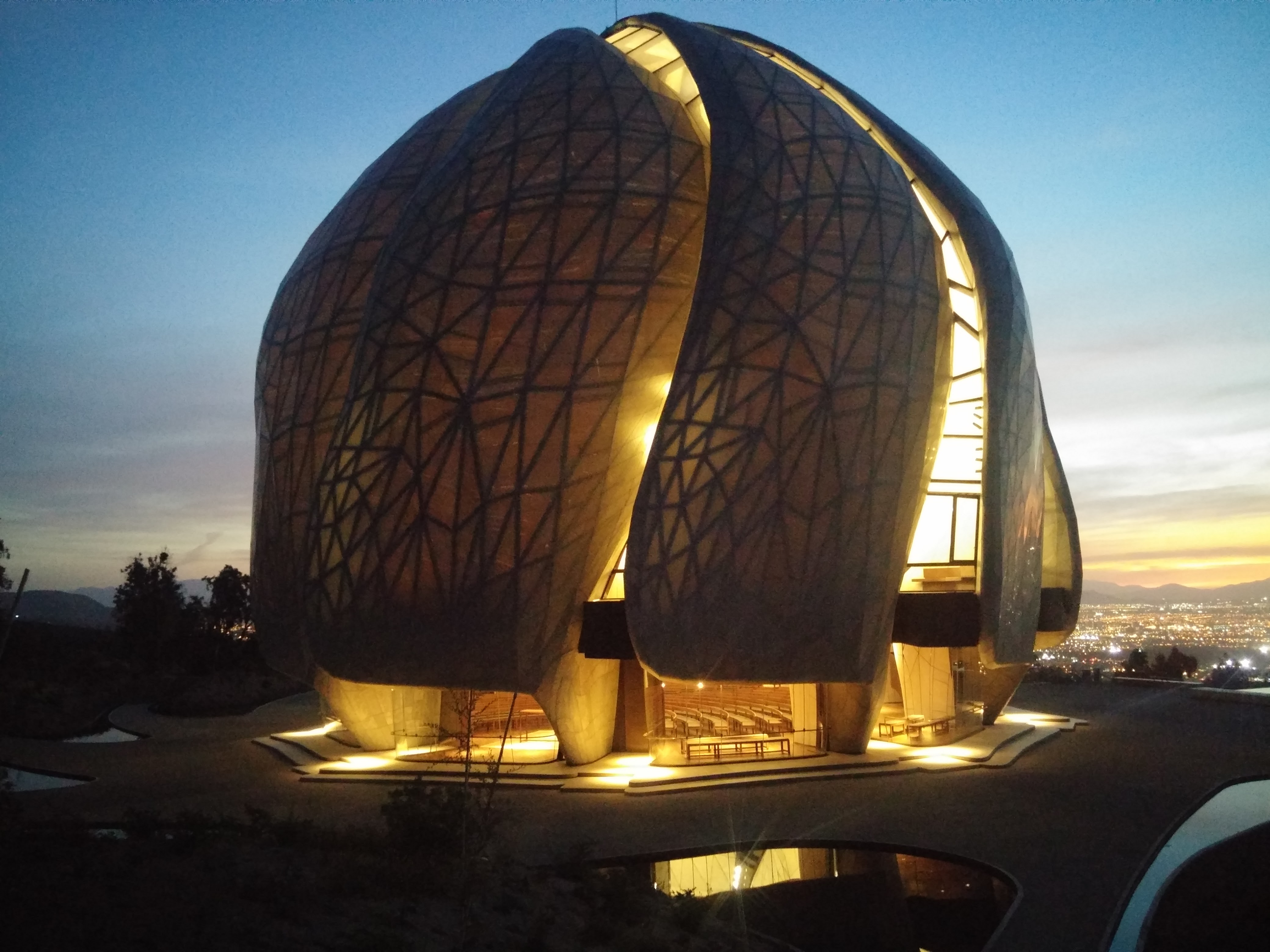
Temple at night

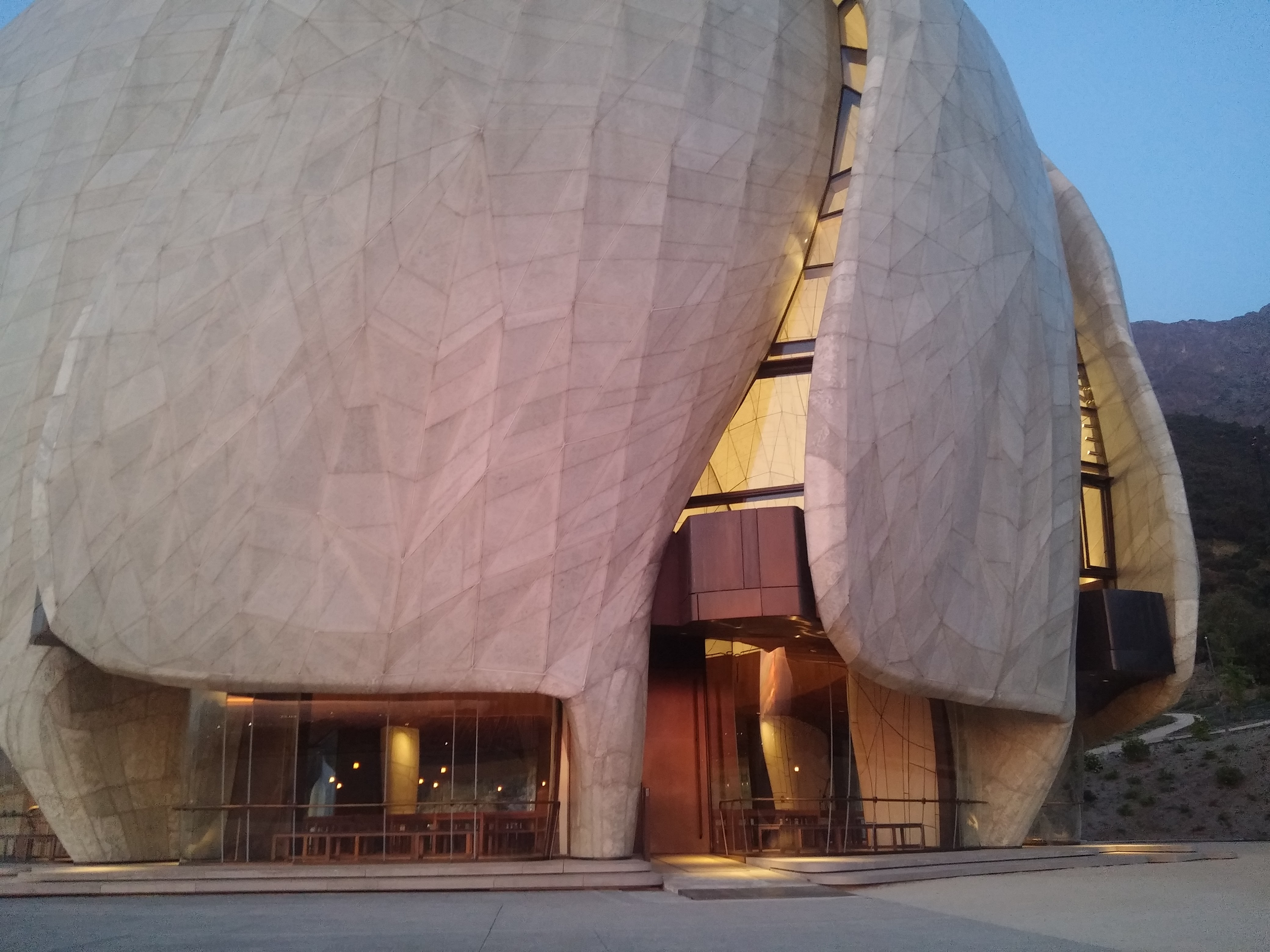
Entrance

== See also ==
- Lotus Temple
- Chicago Baháʼí House of Worship
- Sydney Baháʼí Temple
- Baháʼí teachings
- Prayer in the Baháʼí Faith
- Baháʼí Faith in South America
- Tourism in Chile
- Religion in Chile
