= Hariri Pontarini Architects =

Canadian architecture firm

- Type: Private
- Industry: Architecture
- Founded: 1994
- Founders: Siamak Hariri; David Pontarini
- Headquarters: Toronto, Ontario, Canada
- Services: Architecture, Urban Design, Master Planning, Interior Design
- Website: www.hariripontarini.com

Hariri Pontarini Architects (HPA) is a full-service architectural practice based in Toronto, Canada.

HPA's first critically acclaimed project was for McKinsey & Company's Toronto headquarters, which became one of the youngest buildings to be designated with Heritage Status by the City of Toronto.

While most of the firm's work is in Canada, they also deliver projects internationally.

== History ==
Siamak Hariri and David Pontarini founded the practice in 1994, delivering major projects across several sectors including mixed-use, institutional, residential, commercial, and hospitality.

In 2026, the firm named Doron Meinhard and Michael Attard as Partners.

== Select completed projects ==
- 2025: Artists' Alley (234 Simcoe Street / 121 St. Patrick St), Toronto, Ontario, Canada
- 2025: Marianne and Edward Gibson Art Museum, Simon Fraser University, Burnaby, British Columbia, Canada
- 2025: Toronto House (19 Duncan Street), Toronto, Ontario, Canada
- 2024: The Well, Toronto, Ontario, Canada
- 2022: BARLO Multiple Sclerosis Centre, St. Michael's Hospital, Toronto, Ontario, Canada
- 2021: Nicol Building, Sprott School of Business, Carleton University, Ottawa, Ontario, Canada
- 2020: Tom Patterson Theatre, Stratford Festival, Stratford, Ontario, Canada
- 2020: Princess Margaret Cancer Centre Space Transformation, Toronto, Ontario, Canada
- 2019: Massey Tower, Toronto, Ontario, Canada
- 2019: King Portland Centre, Toronto, Ontario, Canada
- 2018: One Bloor, Toronto, Ontario, Canada
- 2018: Essex Centre of Research, University of Windsor, Ontario, Canada
- 2017: Casey House, Toronto, Ontario, Canada
- 2016: Jackman Law Building, University of Toronto Faculty of Law, Toronto, Ontario, Canada (with B+H Architects)
- 2016: Bahá'í Temple for South America, Santiago, Chile
- 2013: The Richard Ivey Building, Ivey Business School at Western University
- 2012: Shangri-La Toronto Hotel and Residences
- 2012: Bloor Cinema, Toronto, Ontario, Canada
- 2011: Michael G. DeGroote School of Medicine, McMaster University, Hamilton, Ontario, Canada
- 2010: The Weston Family Learning Centre, Art Gallery of Ontario (AGO), Toronto, Ontario, Canada
- 2010: The Ontario Pavilion for the 2010 Vancouver Winter Olympics, British Columbia, Canada
- 2009: Max Gluskin House, Department of Economics University of Toronto, Ontario, Canada
- 2008: School of Pharmacy, University of Waterloo, Ontario, Canada
- 2003: The Seymour Schulich Building, Schulich School of Business, York University, Toronto, Ontario, Canada
- 2001: MacLaren Art Centre, Barrie, Ontario, Canada
- 1999: McKinsey & Co. Toronto, Ontario, Canada
- 1998: Robertson House Crisis Care Centre, Toronto, Ontario, Canada

== Work in progress ==
- Pinnacle SkyTower and Pinnacle One Yonge, Toronto, Ontario, Canada
- OpenROM, Royal Ontario Museum, Toronto, Ontario, Canada
- New Ontario Science Centre at Ontario Place, Toronto, Ontario, Canada (with Snohetta)
- College Park Redevelopment, Toronto, Ontario, Canada

== Select awards ==
Hariri Pontarini Architects has been honoured with numerous national and international awards, including the 2013 Royal Architectural Institute of Canada's Architectural Firm Award.

- 2025 Council on Vertical Urbanism Urban Habitat Award of Excellence for The Well
- 2022 Governor General's Medal in Architecture for the Tom Patterson Theatre
- 2020 Governor General's Medal in Architecture for the Baháʼí Temple of South America
- 2020 Royal Architectural Institute of Canada's National Urban Design Award for Casey House
- 2019 Royal Architectural Institute of Canada's International Prize for the Baháʼí Temple of South America
- 2019 American Institute of Architects Healthcare Design Award for Casey House
- 2018 Governor General's Medal in Architecture for Casey House
- 2017 American Institute of Architects Innovation Award for the Baháʼí Temple of South America
- 2017 Royal Architectural Institute of Canada's Innovation in Architecture Award for the Baháʼí Temple of South America
- 2016 Ontario Association of Architects Lieutenant Governor's Award for Design Excellence in Architecture for the Richard Ivey School of Business
- 2006 Governor General's Medal in Architecture for the Schulich School of Business at York University

== See also ==
- Architecture of Toronto
- Siamak Hariri
- David Pontarini
