= Mark McLean =

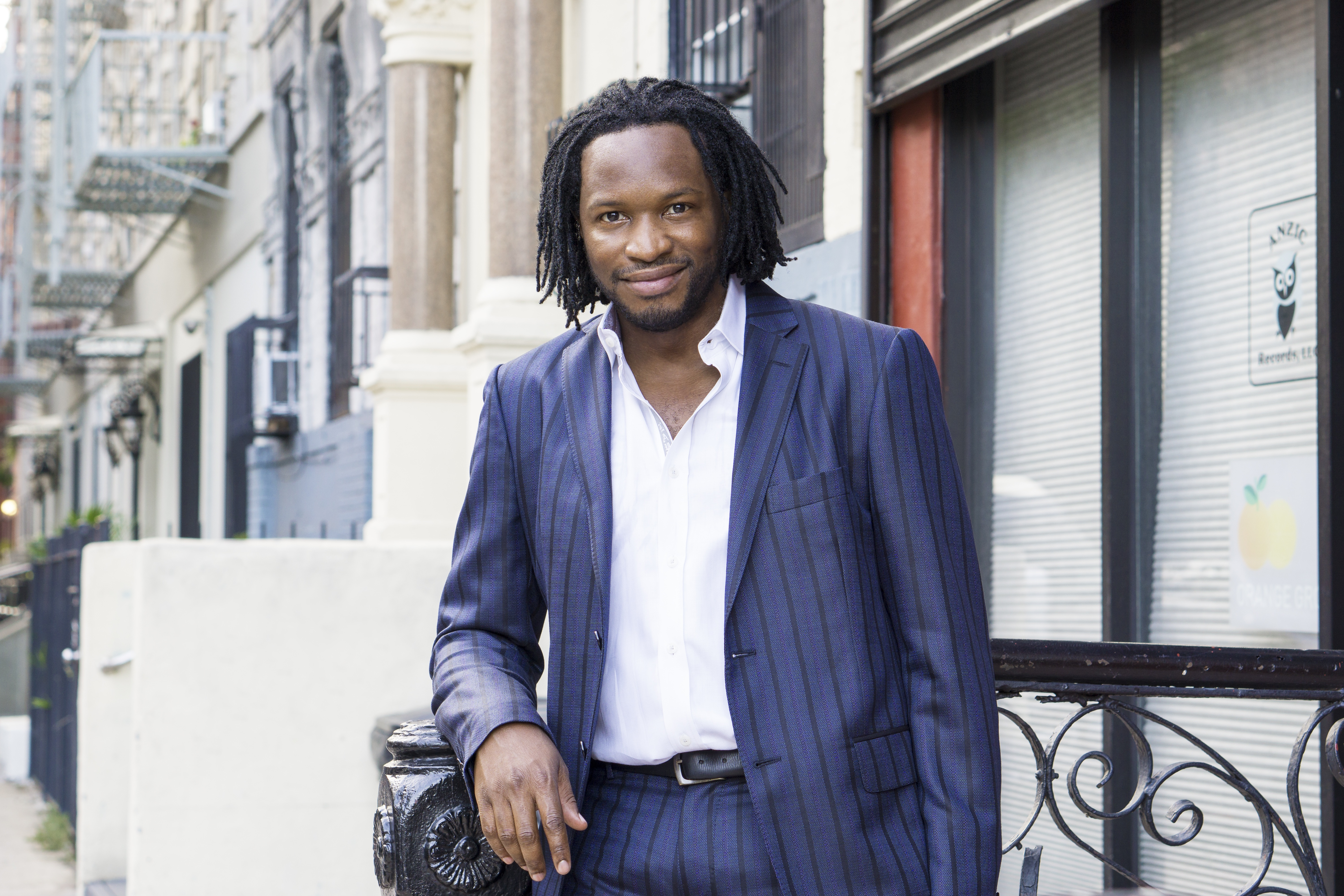
- McLean in September 2015

Background information
- Born: February 5, 1975 (age 51); North York, Ontario, Canada
- Origin: New York City
- Genres: Jazz, contemporary, blues
- Occupations: Musician, songwriter, lyricist, producer
- Instruments: Drums, piano
- Years active: 1997–present
- Label: none
- Website: markmclean.com

Mark McLean (born February 5, 1975) is a Canadian musician, drummer, composer, lyricist and studio musician. McLean lives and works primarily in New York. He has released three albums under his own name. The first showcases his arrangements of jazz standards while his later albums are original material (except one song). His very early influence was his father's record collection, which included every genre: from Johann Sebastian Bach to James Brown. McLean is becoming known as the "drum whisperer" in part because he can coax organic sounds out of any drum kit. McLean is musically multilingual: jazz, rhythm and blues, funk, pop or any genre required for the song.

McLean's great uncle, Cy McLean was one of the first black band leaders in Canada. His brother Lester McLean is an accomplished saxophonist and vocalist in the Toronto jazz and RnB scene.

McLean began his career at age nine as a gifted classical pianist, but by age 14 had started a second career playing the drums. By the time he was 18, the drums eclipsed the piano as McLean's voice for musical expression and the age of 22 he was playing with fellow Canadian and jazz icon, Oscar Peterson.

McLean graduated with honors from The University of Toronto with a bachelor's in performance in jazz. In his third year faculty member Don Thompson invited him to play on the first of the more than 70 recordings on which McLean appears. He was also named "Post-secondary Musician of the Year" by the Jazz Report Magazine in 1998. That summer McLean taught at Canada's Interprovincial Music Camp (jazz). He was also the jazz director at Sir John A. Macdonald Collegiate Institute while taking his undergraduate degree.

McLean's recording and touring highlights include George Michael, Gladys Knight, Joe Sample, Jamie Cullum, Andy Bey, Molly Johnson, Peter Cincotti, Andrea Bocelli, Serena Ryder, Catherine Russell, Jane Bunnett, Billy Joel, Dionne Warwick and Michael Kaeshammer.

McLean has two movie appearances: Drummer in Peter Cincotti band in Spider-Man 2 (uncredited) and Peter Cincotti: Live in New York (credited).

McLean is endorsed by Regal Tip Mallets and Brushes, Zildjian Sticks and Cymbals, Remo drum heads and Yamaha Drums.

== New York ==
McLean moved to New York City in 1999 following receipt of a grant awarded him by the Canada Council for the Arts. Initially, McLean wanted to study with drummer, Brian Blade. Although he did not teach, Blade mentored McLean by allowing him to observe his performances. He even helped him shop for a drum kit and as luck would have it, they walked into Drummer's World on 46th street in Manhattan and met jazz drummer, archivist and radio personality, Kenny Washington. Blade said to McLean "this is who you should study with." McLean studied with Kenny Washington for a year followed by an additional year with drummer Billy Kilson. After that McLean decided to stay for future opportunities in New York. Singer and pianist Andy Bey was the first to call, then Dewey Redman.

== Work with other artists ==
McLean has worked with many of jazz masters and pop icons, including Wynton Marsalis, Michael Feinstein, Billy Joel, Quincy Jones, Gladys Knight, Diana Krall, Glen Campbell, Carla Cook, Linda Eder, Jimmy Webb, Vanessa Williams, Patti Austin, the Backstreet Boys and producer Phil Ramone. He also served as arranger on Molly Johnson's 2009 Juno-award-winning album Lucky, and was co-arranger on Sophie Milman's 2009 release Take Love Easy, while continuing to tour and record as a member of George Michael's band.

Producer Phil Ramone following a recording session with Billy Joel remarked: "Mark McLean is a tasty, sure handed drummer, a song man’s musician." Andy Bey described McLean as "an intelligent, immensely talented young musician with a curious mind and a listening ear."

== Albums ==
Year	Album	Description
2017	It Feels Alright	Selections from Feel Alright re-imagined by artists and DJ's
2013	Feel Alright	All tunes written by Mark McLean, eclectic album featuring 7 vocalists
2010	Playground	All compositions written by Mark Mclean (except one)
2008	Dinner Party – Piano Jazz	Jazz Standards

== Reviews and awards ==
Year	Type	Event	
2012	Feature	Feature: Mark McLean & Lea Mullen	Rhythm magazine, written by Rich Chamberlain
2012	Review	Toronto Jazz Festival	Globe & Mail
2010	Feature	Drums Etc magazine	T. Bruce Wittet
2009	Award	Juno Award for Jazz Album of the Year	Luck – Molly Johnson
2008	Review	National Arts Centre, Ottawa	All About Jazz
2006	Review	Toronto International Dance Festival	Live Music Report
2005	Nomination	Grammy, Best Jazz Vocal Album	American Song, Andy Bey
2005	Review	The Sound of a Really Different Drummer	Mark Miller
2003	Award	Socan Awards	Another Day, Molly Johnson, Mark McLean
2003	Nomination	Traditional Jazz Album	Juno Awards of 2003

== Session work ==
Year	Artist	Album
2016	Catherine Russell	Harlem on My Mind
2016	Leslie Odom Jr.	Simply Christmas
2015	Morgan James	Holiday Singles
2015	Jann Arden	A Jann Arden Christmas
2015	Melissa Errico	What About Today? – Live at 54 Below
2015	Tia Brazda	Bandshell
2014	Morgan James	Hunter
2014	Rotem Sivan Trio	For Emotional Use Only
2014	Laura Cole	Dirty Cheat
2014	George Michael	Symphonica
2014	Catherine Russell	Bring It Back
2013	Carline Ray	Vocal Sides
2013	Michael Kaeshammer	With You in Mind
2013	Carline Ray	Vocal Sides
2012	Dionne Warwick	Now: A Celebratory 50th Anniversary Album
2012	Catherine Russell	Strictly Romancin'
2011	Molly Johnson	The Molly Johnson Songbook
2011	Michael Kaeshammer	Kaeshammer
2011	Lester McLean	4-3-2-1
2010	Kelly Jefferson	Next Exit
2010	David Goldman	Light in the Tunnel
2010	Shannon Butcher	Little Hearts
2010	Marian Petrescu	Thrivin' – Live at The Jazz Standard
2010	Lester McLean	Just a Taste
2010	Andy Creegan	Andiwork III
2009	The Count Basie Orchestra	Swinging, Swinging, Playing
2009	Michael Kaeshammer	Lovelight
2009	Hilary Kole	Haunted Heart
2009	Sophie Millman	Take Love Easy
2009	Jamie Cullum	The Pursuit
2008	Chantal Chamberland	The Other Woman
2008	Lamont Jeffreys	Christmas Dinner
2008	Funky People	Feel the Funk
2008	Shannon Butcher	The Words We Both Could Say
2008	Molly Johnson	Lucky
2008	Pete Coulman Band	TV Tunes
2008	Billy Stritch	Billy Stritch Sings Mel Torme
2008	DK Ibomeka	I'm Your Man
2007	Andrew Craig	The Gospel Christmas Project
2007	Billy Joel	All My Life
2007	Autorickshaw	So the Journey Goes
2007	Howard Fishman	Bob Dylan & The Band's "Basement Tapes", Live at Joe's Pub
2006	Molly Johnson	Messin' Around
2006	Serena Ryder	If Your Memory Serves You Well
2006	Gladys Knight	Before Me
2006	Susan Cagle	The Subway Recordings
2005	Lester McLean Trio	Best Foot Forward
2005	Kelly Jefferson Quartet	Spark
2005	Linda Eder	By Myself
2005	Mike Evan	I'll Bring the Stereo
2004	Andy Creegan	Andiwork II
2004	Andy Bey	American Song
2004	Anne Mette Iversen	Pá den anden side/On the Other Side
2004	Jane Bunnett	Red Dragonfly
2004	Peter Cincotti	On the Moon
2004	Various Artists	Voices of Concord Jazz
2003	Peter Cincotti	My Favorite Time of Year
2003	Syreeta Neal	Stand Tall
2002	Howard Fishman Quartet	Do What I Want
2002	Jane Bunnett	Spirituals and Dedications
2002	Molly Johnson	Another Day
2002	The Colour of Soul	100% Concentrate
2002	Wade O. Brown	Complete
2001	Kalabash	Kalabash
2001	Molly Johnson	Molly Johnson
2000	Shannon Brooks	A Taste of Life
2000	Tracey Wilkins	I Wish I Knew
2000	Wade O. Brown	Solid Soul
1999	Benjamin Davill	Benjamin Davill's Wild West Show
1999	Janice Freedman	Triptych
1999	The Colour of Soul	Texatronic
1998	Divine Earth Essence	Groove Essentials V.2
1998	Mantini Sisters	Moments to Remember
1998	Paul Tobey	Wayward
1998	The Colour of Soul	Live@525
1997	Andy Creegan	Andiwork
1997	Dawn Sierra	A Little Rain Must Fall
1997	Don Thompson	Banff Jazz All Stars
1997	Tara MacLean	If You See Me
