= Collège des Grands-Lacs =

College in Toronto, Ontario, Canada

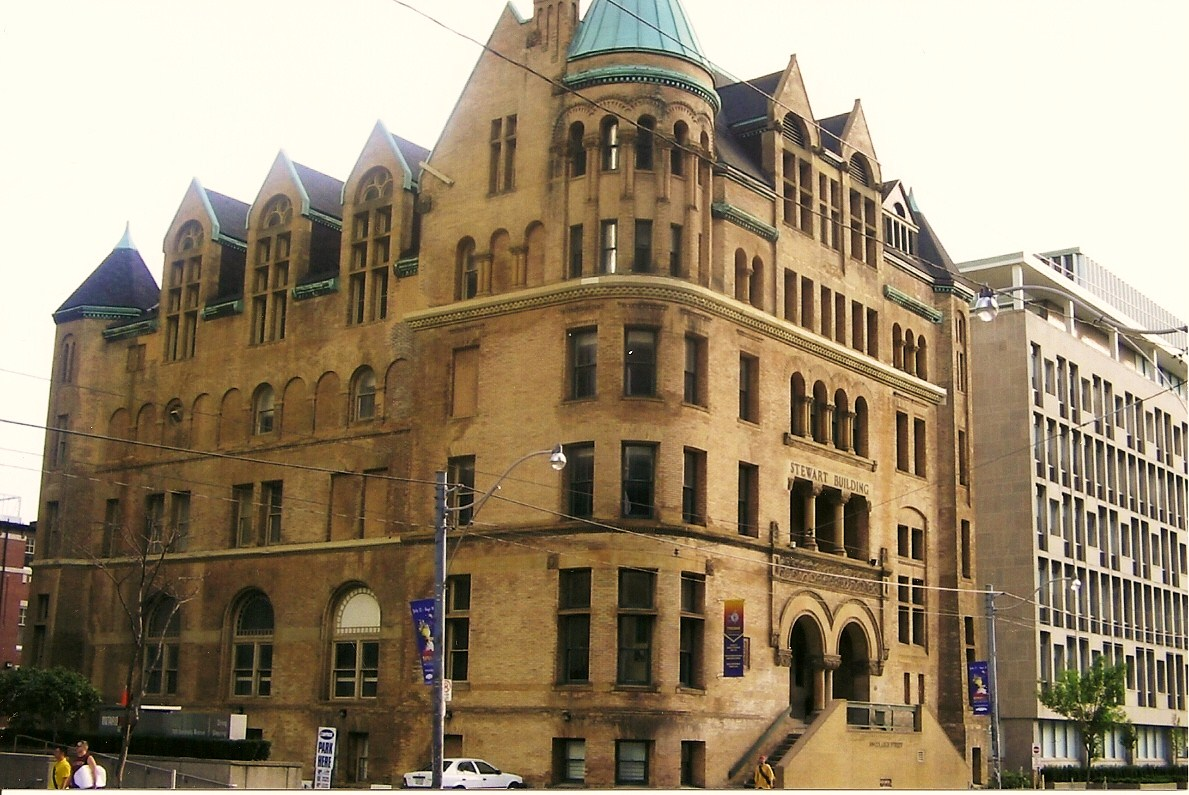
- Former Stewart Building campus of the Collège des Grands-Lacs
- Type: College of Applied Arts and Technology
- Active: 1995–2001
- Location: Toronto, Ontario, Canada
- Language: French
- Status: Defunct

Collège des Grands-Lacs (lit. "Great Lakes College") was a francophone College of Applied Arts and Technology in Toronto, Ontario, Canada. It was established in 1995 as Ontario's third college specifically serving the Franco-Ontarian population, after La Cité collégiale in Ottawa and Collège Boréal in Sudbury.

== Launch and operations ==
It began as a "virtual college" which had no central campus, and instead offered instruction through student access centres in Toronto, Hamilton, Penetanguishene, Welland and Windsor. Instructors located in any of the access centres delivered course lectures to all five locations simultaneously through videoconferencing technology, and students outside of those areas could also access the college's courses through partnerships with other educational institutions or through distance education.

In 1999, a permanent campus was opened in Toronto, in the Stewart Building at 149 College Street which had recently been vacated by the Ontario College of Art and Design. By this time the access centres in Welland and Windsor were considered full satellite campuses, although the ones in Hamilton and Penetanguishene were still classified as access centres.

In 2000, the college was reported by the media as the subject of a Royal Canadian Mounted Police investigation into a fraud allegation around misuse of government funds, which briefly caused the delay of a federal government announcement of new funding to all three of Ontario's francophone colleges. Within days, however, the RCMP confirmed that the college was not under investigation.

Soon thereafter, the college began exploring a proposal to move its Welland campus to the then-proposed new Welland Civic Centre.

== Shutdown ==
In 2001, the college's board of governors decided to close the college, due to declining enrolment. Some supporters of the college tried to obtain a court injunction against the shutdown, but were not successful. Second-year students were allowed to complete their programs with Collège des Grands-Lacs as it wound down, while first-year students were offered transfers to the equivalent programs at Collège Boréal. The Ministry of Training, Colleges and Universities begin negotiations with College Boréal to offer programs in Central and Southwestern Ontario.

The college ceased operations in 2002. Its programs and services were taken over by Collège Boréal, although that college did not take over the Grands-Lacs campus on College Street: initially offering its classes at the Carlaw Avenue campus of Centennial College in Toronto, Boréal moved to its own new campus at One Yonge Street in 2012.

Some community members and the Ontario Public Service Employees Union continued to fight for the college to be reopened under the constitutional principle of respect for and protection of minority rights; the case, Gigliotti v Conseil d'administration du Collège des Grands Lacs, was heard by the Ontario Superior Court of Justice in 2005. The court dismissed the case, ruling that minority language rights had not been violated since Collège Boréal had stepped in to continue offering French-language college education programs in the regions formerly served by Grands-Lacs.

A 2012 report by the provincial Commissioner of French Language Services into French language education in Southwestern Ontario identified both the school's original "virtual college" model, which left it unable to truly build a profile as a French-language cultural institution or community hub in the cities it served, and the financial challenges resulting from its subsequent conversion to a more conventional campus-based model, as factors in the school's eventual failure. It also found that despite the technological innovation represented by the "virtual college" model, students still valued aspects of the educational experience that can only be provided by a physical campus, such as centralized student services and the ability to collaborate, interact and socialize with other fellow students.
