= Shangri-La Toronto =

Luxury hotel in Toronto

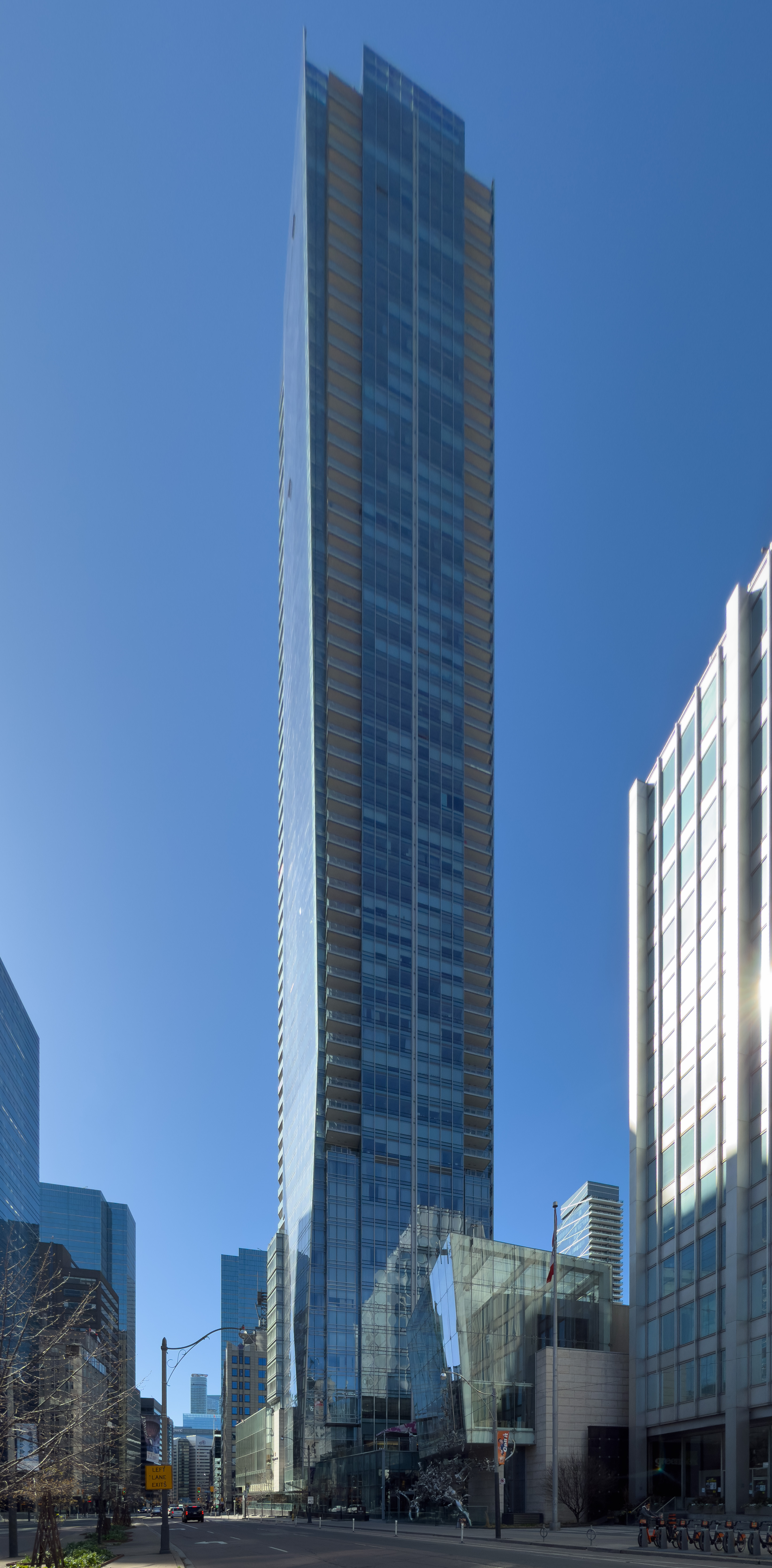
- Interactive map of the Shangri-La Toronto area

General information
- Type: Hotel and residential
- Location: 188 University Avenue; Toronto, Ontario; M5H 0A3
- Coordinates: 43.649°N 79.386°W
- Construction started: February 2008
- Opened: October 2012

Height
- Roof: 214 m (702 ft)

Technical details
- Floor count: 65 (plus 8 parking levels below)
- Floor area: 81,129 m^{2} (873,270 sq ft)
- Lifts/elevators: 17

Design and construction
- Architect: James K. M. Cheng
- Architecture firm: Hariri Pontarini Architects
- Developer: Westbank Projects Corp.

Shangri-La Toronto is a luxury hotel and residential condominium building at 188 University Avenue in downtown Toronto, Ontario, Canada. It was designed by James K. M. Cheng and built by Ian Gillespie's Westbank Projects Corp.; they also designed and built the Living Shangri-La building in Vancouver. Shangri-La Toronto is 214 meters tall and is one of the tallest buildings in Toronto. The hotel component is run by Shangri-La Hotels and Resorts, and it has 202 guest rooms and suites. The condominium portion occupies the upper floors of the building and consists of 393 units. The building was completed in 2012.

== History ==
Shangri-La Toronto is located on University Avenue and Adelaide Street, in an area just west of the Financial District that has seen rapid growth in recent years. Early in Toronto's history, the site had been home to a number of smaller structures, most notably the historic Bishop's Block. The Bishop's Block was built in the 1830s by John Bishop, who built a series of Georgian row houses on the site. A nine-storey office tower at 188 University, erected in the 1960's, served as the headquarters for Zurich Insurance Company's Canadian operations. Zurich Canada's acquisition of Travelers Canada in 1988 led to its head offices migrating up to what had been known as the Travelers Tower at 400 University Avenue, and cleared the way for redevelopment of the site.

Most buildings on the block were then torn down and replaced with a large parking lot. The one exception was a structure that served as one of the city's first hotels and then for many decades as a pub, the Pretzel Bell Tavern, which became a popular hangout of the Maple Leafs. It too was abandoned for several decades, but as a heritage structure, it was not torn down. This building was disassembled for the construction of Shangri-La Toronto, but the developers had pledged to rebuild and restore the Bishop's Block as part of the project.

Before excavation, the site was the subject of several months of archaeological exploration, and many artifacts from the city's early history were found. At 102 ft (31 m), Shangri-La Toronto was the second-deepest excavation for a building in Canada's history, with only Scotia Plaza being deeper. This was done to create an eight-level below-grade parking garage. Excavation of the site started in 2008, and work on the parking garage began in early 2009.

== See also ==
- List of tallest buildings in Canada
- List of tallest buildings in Toronto
