= Warwick Hotel (Toronto) =

Coordinates: 43.6571°N 79.3745°W

The Warwick Hotel Toronto was a hotel located at the corner of Dundas Street East and Jarvis Street, in Toronto, Ontario, Canada. It was notable as being the site of significant dance band performances until approximately 1960, after which it became notable as a location for burlesque entertainment.

== History ==
The hotel was initially a higher end hotel in downtown Toronto, featuring many of the dance bands of the 1940s and 1950s. The building was constructed in 1910 and originally known as the Royal Cecil Apartments. It was later known as the Royal Cecil Hotel and was owned by millionaire contractor James Franceschini. During World War II, Franceschini was interned, based on his alleged association with Mussolini. As of the 1950s, the hotel was owned and renamed by Harry Sniderman who, with his associates, at one time owned three of the four corners at Dundas and Jarvis. Sniderman was a former semi-professional athlete, once regarded as the best fastball pitcher in Canada.

Author Hugh Garner made his home at the Warwick Hotel for a period, and referenced the hotel in his pseudonym, Jarvis Warwick, when writing pulp fiction.

As of 1960, the hotel had changed its focus to burlesque entertainment, and was notable as having one of Toronto's earlier crossdressing personalities, Allan Maloney, hosting the evening in his alter ego as Brandee.
