= Casey House (Toronto) =

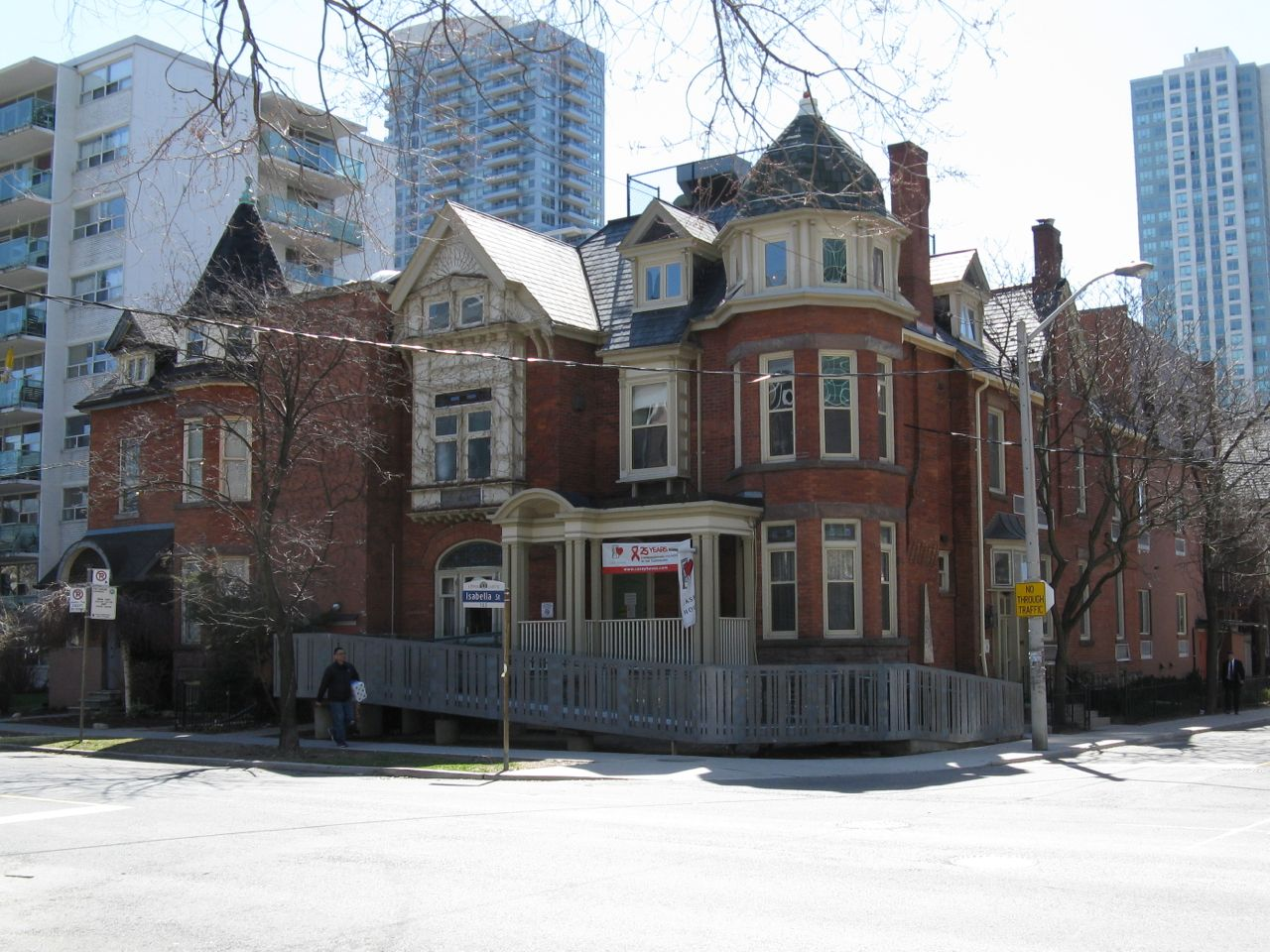
- The original Casey House on Huntley St.

- Location in Toronto

Geography
- Location: 119 Isabella Street; Toronto, Ontario, Canada; M4Y 1P2
- Coordinates: 43.6691°N 79.3781°W

Organisation
- Type: Specialist

Services
- Beds: 14 inpatient
- Speciality: HIV AIDS specialty hospital

History
- Founded: 1988

Links
- Website: http://www.caseyhouse.com/

Casey House is a specialty hospital in Toronto, Ontario, Canada that cares for people living with and at risk of HIV. Casey House provides inpatient and outpatient services and is located in the downtown area, at the corner of Jarvis and Isabella streets. Founded in 1988 by a group of volunteers, journalists, and activists, it was the first specialized facility of its kind in Canada. It is named after Casey Frayne, whose mother June Callwood was one of the principal volunteers whose efforts brought about the founding of the hospital.

== History ==
Casey House was the first stand-alone hospice for people dying of AIDS in Canada. Aware that community relations would be especially important to establish such an institution in a residential neighborhood, Callwood and other volunteers met with community leaders before the location of the project was announced in 1986, then organized door-to-door visits to provide information to residents.

Work on establishing the hospice first began in October 1986, when June Callwood and Margaret McBurney helped volunteers to register and incorporate Casey House as a charity. In March 1987, the former Fife House at 9 Huntley was purchased and renovated with $1 million from the Ontario Ministry of Health and $500,000 from the first Drag Queen fundraiser show for the project.

By March 1988, Casey House opened its doors. The first client, who was in isolation for months and was delivered to the hospice by medics wearing masks and gowns, was received by Casey House with an embrace. Around this time, the life expectancy of a person diagnosed with AIDS was 9 months.

The opening of Casey House marked the first hospice in the world to provide support and palliative care for people with HIV/AIDS, at a time when little was yet known about the disease and the ignorance and fear surrounding it were intense. June's goal for Casey House was to establish a place of medical excellence in the treatment of HIV/AIDS and, most importantly, a place of love and compassion.

When Casey House opened in 1988, its founders expected that a cure for the disease would be found so that it would not be needed in the 21st century. Instead, HIV became more treatable but not curable, so more care was needed. The building has since been transformed from a hospice to a hospital under the Ontario Hospital Act.

The hospice is named for Casey Frayne, who was the son of June Callwood and Trent Frayne. Casey was killed in 1982, at the age of 20, by an impaired driver while riding his motorcycle to university. The tragedy June experienced in losing her son was also shared by Margaret McBurney, co-founders of the facility. Both mothers had lost their sons to impaired drivers and were appalled by society's treatment of people dying from AIDS with no comfort. The facility was named after June's son in memory of the tragedy of losing a young life.

From 2000-2009, and permanently since 2018, Casey House operates from the former Johnston (Coach) House (c. 1875 built by Langley and Burke for William R. Johnston) at 119 Isabella Street (571 Jarvis Street) in the heart of Toronto's gaybourhood. Fife House remains a part of Casey's House, now repurposed as a transitional housing facility for unhoused people living with HIV-AIDS.

Casey and Diana, a dramatization by playwright Nick Green of the 1991 visit of Diana, Princess of Wales to Casey House, premiered at the 2023 Stratford Festival under the direction of Andrew Kushnir.

== Expansion ==
In 2000, the hospital acquired the 1875 William R. Johnston house that fronts onto Jarvis Street, formerly nicknamed "the Grey Lady" by neighborhood residents due to its grey paint (now removed). In 2015 renovation begun on the existing mansion, to restore its heritage features and to add a large addition to the west. The 1889 coach house at the southwest corner of Huntley and Isabella Streets was demolished to make way for the addition.

In October 2010, with the medical advances of HIV and AIDS, the need arises to care for patients with HIV/AIDS focusing on treating their illness, and not just providing comfort for their last days. A $10 million capital campaign was launched to supplement the Ontario Ministry of Health and Long-Term Care's commitment to fund the construction of an expanded facility. This $10 million campaign was completed in February 2017, by then the campaign was dubbed "Rebuilding Lives Capital Campaign".

When the redevelopment was completed in June 2017, the building itself was renovated as a purpose-built facility and restored heritage house. The redevelopment enables the hospital to more than double its care capacity, including new programs better suited for the new approaches to care required for a more ambulatory and diverse population of people living longer with HIV.

The new 58,000 square foot health care center designed by Hariri Pontarini Architects allows Casey House to expand and improve upon its capacity to provide advanced HIV/AIDS specialty health care services including inpatient, day health care and community care, including outreach.

=== Day Health Program ===
On the day of its expansion in 2017, Casey House initiated a program to address the gaps in the care of HIV/AIDS clients. The program focuses on clients who were seen to be well enough to be able to live with HIV/AIDS. The program is designed as one-stop care and treatment for individuals affected by HIV/AIDS by making clinical services and community programs more easily accessible and geared towards a client's treatment. Their underlying focus of reducing patient's isolation and improving their overall health with inclusivity and unequivocal compassion remains much a part of the program as it did from the beginning of Casey House.
