= Massey Tower =

Building complex in Toronto, Ontario, Canada

Coordinates: 43.65350°N 79.37921°W

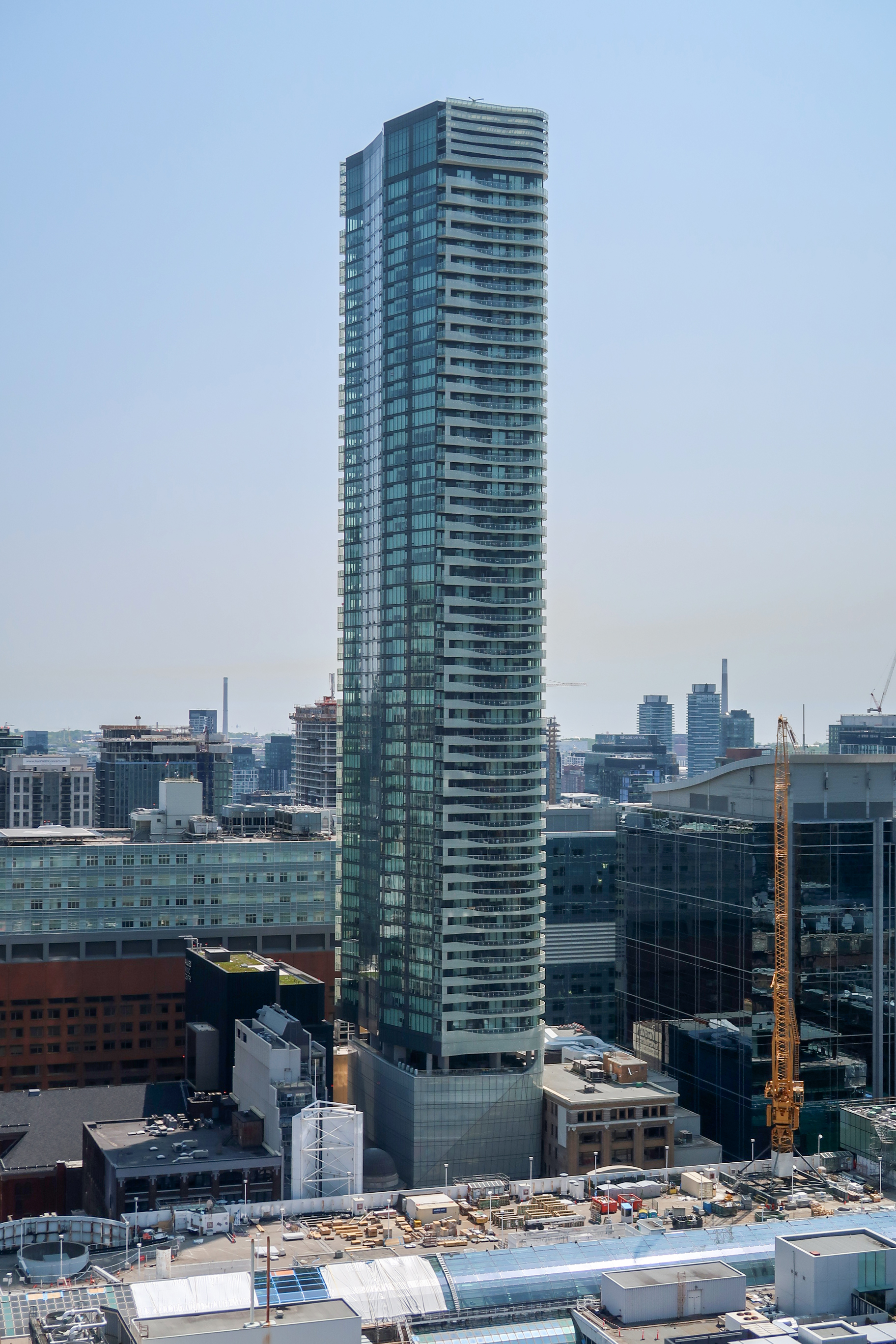
Massey Tower

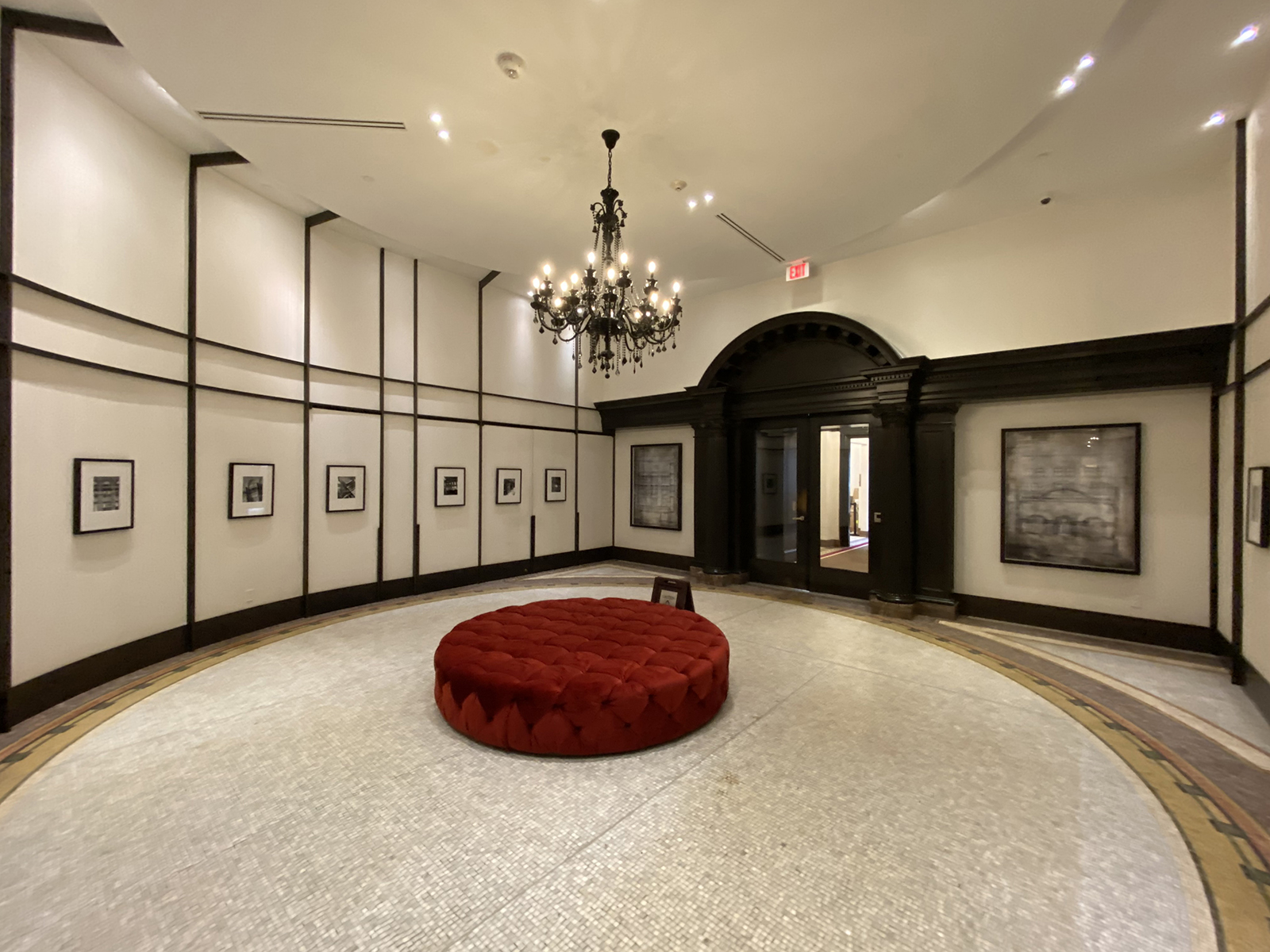
Massey Tower lobby kept the historic doors

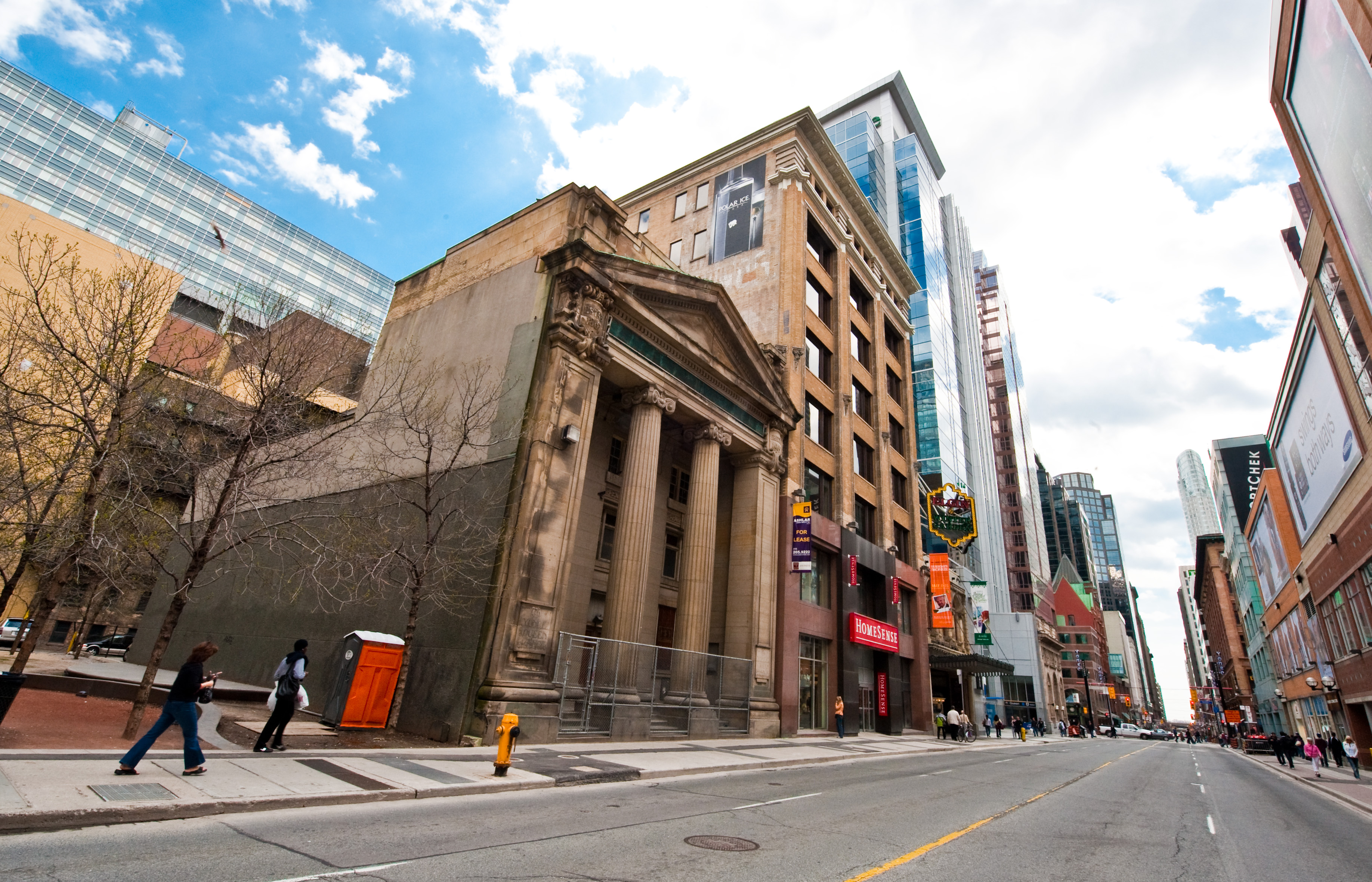
197 Yonge Street before construction of Massey Tower. The facade is now incorporated into the tower's base.

Massey Tower is a condo complex in Toronto, Ontario, Canada, spanning the block below Shuter Street, between Yonge and Victoria streets. The complex's northeast corner added much-needed backstage space to historic Massey Hall. To the south of the complex lies the historic Elgin and Winter Garden Theatres. The Yonge Street facade uses the 1905 Canadian Bank of Commerce headquarters at 197 Yonge Street, vacant since 1987. The complex's tower rises 60 storeys and stands 208.3 metres (683 ft) in height.

The vacant space was once the Colonial Tavern and was Yonge Street Theatre Block Park until 2015, when trees were removed. Access to this park has been blocked on-and-off since 2007.

The building's footprint is S-shaped. Floors three through eight house a parking garage.

The building's developers were MOD Developments, and the building was designed by Hariri Pontarini Architects. The building was constructed by Tucker HiRise.
