= One Yonge Street =

Office and condo development

Coordinates: 43°38′32″N 79°22′28″W

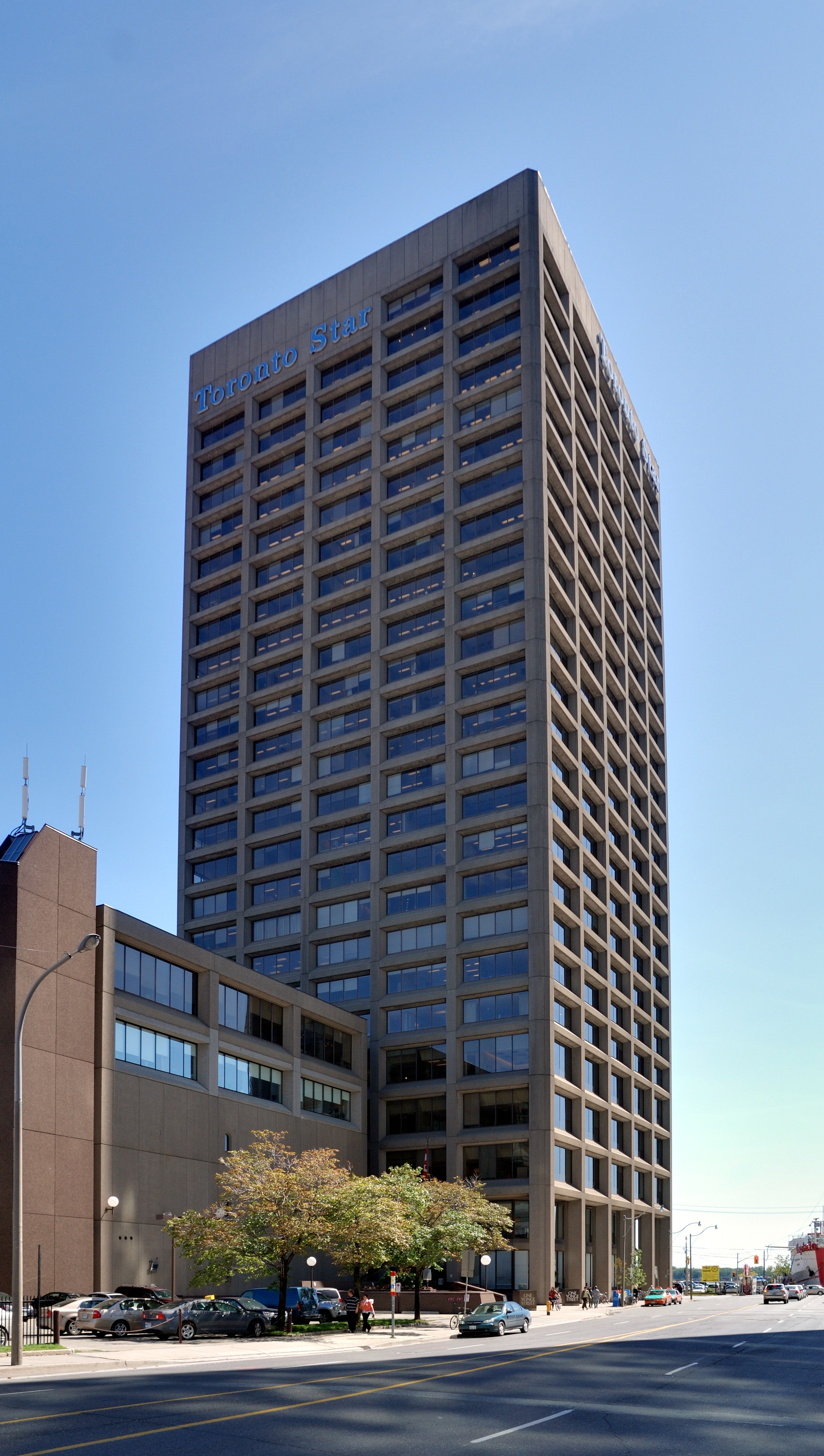
- One Yonge Street in 2008
- Alternative names: Toronto Star Building

General information
- Status: Completed
- Type: Office
- Location: 1 Yonge Street, Toronto, Ontario, Canada
- Current tenants: Liquor Control Board of Ontario, Ontario Clean Water Agency, Zeinact Ventures, Collège Boréal
- Completed: 1970
- Opened: 1971

Height
- Height: 101 metres (331 ft)

Technical details
- Floor count: 25

One Yonge Street (previously known as the Toronto Star Building) is a 25-storey office building in Toronto, Ontario, Canada. The building served as the headquarters of Torstar and its flagship newspaper, the Toronto Star, from 1971 to 2022. It is 101 metres (331 feet) tall and built in the Modernist architectural style. The building is located at the corner of Yonge Street and Queens Quay.

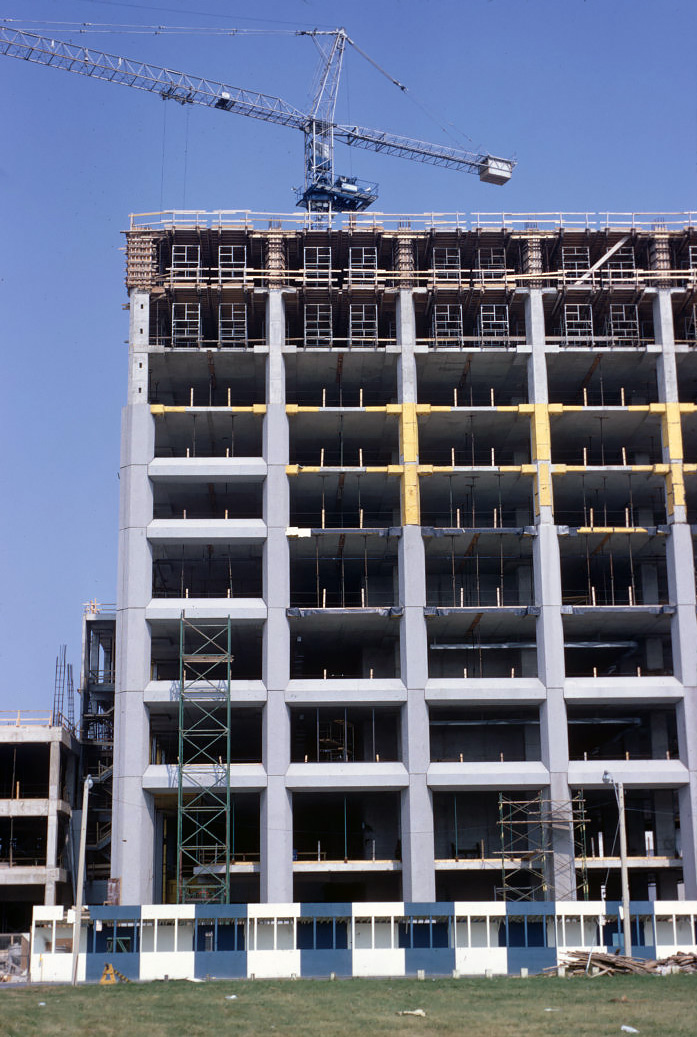
Construction of the Toronto Star Building in 1970

The building also housed the printing presses for the Toronto Star's print edition until 1992, when a new press centre opened in Vaughan, Ontario. The finished newspaper content is sent electronically to the plant where the plates are burnt and the paper is printed and distributed.

The office space at One Yonge Street is leased out to a variety of other companies, including Pinnacle International, the Liquor Control Board of Ontario, Ontario Cannabis Retail Corporation, RL Solutions, Starbucks, Luminus Financial, a dental office, and the downtown Toronto campus of Collège Boréal.

Torstar sold the building and its surrounding property to a private holding company in 2000 for $40 million, but the newspaper continued to occupy several floors of the building on a long-term lease. In December 2021, the Toronto Star announced that it would vacate the building and move its offices to The Well, an office complex that hosts other companies, in 2022. The move was completed in November 2022.

== Redevelopment ==
The parking lot and podium associated with this building are part of a high-profile development known as Pinnacle One Yonge by developer Pinnacle International and designed by Hariri Pontarini Architects. The project includes five skyscrapers on two parcels of land bisected by an eastern extension of Harbour Street. The tallest tower would reach 106 storeys for a total height of 352 metres, making it the tallest in Canada. The three residential towers would total 2,962 condo units, and the two commercial towers would provide 154,000 sq.m of space. In 2024, Pinnacle modified its plans for the former Toronto Star building as they applied for a demolition permit and plan to construct two additional buildings, each exceeding 90 stories in height.

== See also ==
- Old Globe and Mail Building
- Toronto Sun Building
- Toronto Star Press Centre
