= Konrad Pesudovs =

Australian optometrist and outcomes researcher in ophthalmology

Konrad Pesudovs AM
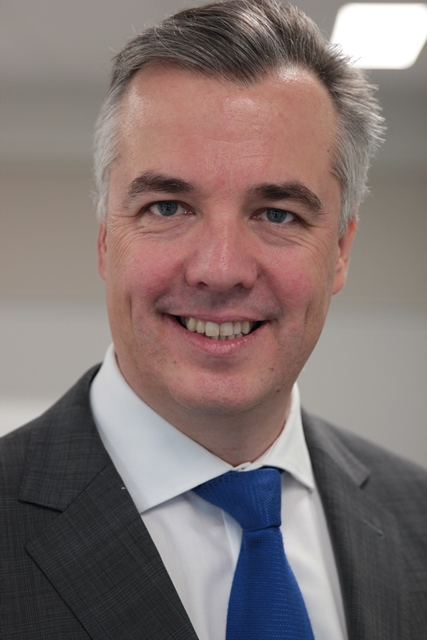
- Pesudovs at Flinders University 2014
- Born: Sydney
- Education: Trinity Grammar School (Victoria)
- Alma mater: University of Melbourne Flinders University
- Occupation: Professor of Optometry
- Organization: University of New South Wales

Konrad Pesudovs (born 1969) is an Australian optometrist and outcomes researcher in ophthalmology; recognised as the leading optometrist researcher worldwide in terms of H-Index and total citations. He is SHARP Professor of Optometry and Vision Science at the University of New South Wales (2020–). He was the Foundation Chair of Optometry and Vision Science at Flinders University from 2009 to 2017.

== Professional career ==
Pesudovs won a National Health and Medical Research Council (NHMRC) Sir Neil Hamilton Fairley Fellowship to be a post-doc at the University of Bradford with Prof David Elliott (2001–2003). He then moved to the University of Houston as a post-doc with Prof Raymond A. Applegate (2003–2004). In late 2004, he returned to Flinders University where he became a clinical research fellow funded by an NHMRC Career Development Fellowship. In 2005, he was Chief Investigator A on the successful funding of the NHMRC Centre of Clinical Research Excellence in Ophthalmology Outcomes Research. Since then he has received a number of NHMRC project grants with a career total NHMRC funding of over US$7million and total career grant funding of over US$15million.

In 2009, he was appointed Foundation Chair of Optometry and Vision Science at Flinders University and set the task of creating a new five-year optometry double degree program.

The course design incorporated innovative teaching and learning strategies including integrated teaching, case-based learning and other student-centred learning strategies, e-learning, communication skills, business skills, evidence-based practice, simulation, high volume clinical exposure, clinical placements using the parallel clinical consulting model, and regional, remote and indigenous student recruitment and training strategies. The Bachelor of Medical Science(Vision Science) /Master of Optometry double degree has been accredited by the Optometry Council of Australia and New Zealand and the Optometry Board of Australia. The first students graduated in 2015. He was the course coordinator of the optometry program, has administrative responsibility for the Discipline of Optometry and oversight of the clinical service: Flinders Vision until December 2017. He was the lead organiser of the annual Evidence-Based Optometry Conference (established 2014). He was also a Visiting Professor, School of Optometry and Ophthalmology and Eye Hospital, Wenzhou Medical College, Key Laboratory of Vision Science, Ministry of Health P.R. China, Wenzhou, Zhejiang, China. He sits on 3 journal editorial boards: Journal of Refractive Surgery, Journal of Cataract & Refractive Surgery, and Ophthalmic and Physiological Optics (2020-) having previously sat on 6 others: Archives of Medical Science (2007–2013), Clinical & Experimental Optometry (2007–2017), The Open Translational Medicine Journal (2008–2014), Journal of Optometry (2008–2016), Ophthalmic and Physiological Optics (2010–2015) and Optometry and Vision Science (2010–2015). He was Chairman of the Board of Administration of the National Vision Research Institute (2015–2016). He was a member of the Governing Council of the Australian College of Optometry (2010–2020), serving as president from 2016 to 2020. He also served as a member of the Steering Committee for the Australian College of Optometry Ocular Therapeutics Course (2011–2012). He has previously served as a state councillor of the Australian Optometrical Association (1992–1996) and the Contact Lens Society of Australia (1993–2000) including 3 years as President (1994–1996). He has been a Committee Member of the Publications Committee for the Association for Research in Vision and Ophthalmology (2012–2014) and was a member of the International Consortium for Health Outcomes Measurement (ICHOM) Health Outcomes Measurement for Cataract Surgery working group.

Pesudovs is trained in Contact Lenses (under AJ Phillips).

Wine

Konrad is passionate about wine, founding the Adelaide Single Bottle Club, is a member of the 2nd Thursday Club (est. 1966), has won the Winestate options competition, makes wine, and in 2018 gained a Diploma in Wine and Spirits from The Wine and Spirit Education Trust.

== Honours ==
Pesudovs was awarded the J Lloyd Hewitt Award in 1994 by the editorial board of Clinical and Experimental Optometry and the Australian Optometrical Association. He was awarded the Peter-Abel Preis in 2006 by Die Vereinigung Deutscher Contactlinsen-Spezialisten e.V. (VDC). He was awarded the Waring Medal in 2006 by the International Society of Refractive Surgery. He was awarded a Young Tall Poppy Science Award, South Australia, for 2007–2008 by the Australian Institute of Policy and Science. He was awarded the Irvin M. and Beatrice Borish Award by the American Academy of Optometry in 2008. He was awarded the Garland W. Clay Award by the American Academy of Optometry in 2009 and again in 2011. He shared The American Public Health Association Vision Care Section 2014 Outstanding Scientific Paper Award with the Vision Loss Expert Group of the Global Burden of Disease 2010. In 2018, Pesudovs was named International Optometrist of the Year. In 2020, he was awarded the H Barry Collin Medal by Optometry Australia. In 2021, he was identified as the leading optometrist researcher worldwide in terms of H-Index and total citations. In 2021, he was awarded the Glenn A Fry Lecture Award by The American Academy of Optometry.

He was appointed a Member of the Order of Australia in the 2026 King's Birthday Honours in recognition of his "significant service to optometry and ophthalmology research, and to clinical education and training".

== Selected works ==
Complete list of peer-reviewed journal articles on the PubMed:

- Search Results for author Pesudovs K on PubMed.

Book chapters:

- Elliott DB, Prokopich L, Pesudovs K. Variations in appearance of the normal eye. In Elliott DB ed. Clinical Procedures in Primary Eyecare. 3rd ed. Edinburgh: Elsevier Butterworth Heinemann, 2007, p222–235.
- Pesudovs K. Influence of Refractive Surgery Complications on Quality Of Life. In Alio JL, Azar D eds. Management of Complications in Refractive Surgery. Berlin: Springer-Verlag. 2008, p9–13.
- Pesudovs K. Assessment of Visual Performance in Keratoconus. In Wang M, Swartz T. Keratoconus and Keratectasia: New Modalities of Diagnosis, Prevention and Treatment. Thorofare, NJ: Slack. 2009.
- Pesudovs K, Elliott DB. Quality of Life after Laser Surgery for Eye Disorders. In Preedy VR, Watson RR eds. Handbook of Disease Burdens and Quality of Life Measures. New York: Springer. 2010, p2379–2394.
- Lamoureux E, Fenwick E, Pesudovs K. The impact of cataract, diabetic retinopathy, diabetic macular edema; and associated treatment interventions on quality of life. In Scholl, Massof RW, West S eds. Ophthalmology and the Ageing Society. Berlin: Springer; 2013, p141–164.
- Elliott DB, Pesudovs K. Variations in appearance of the normal eye. In Elliott DB ed. Clinical Procedures in Primary Eyecare. 4th ed. Edinburgh: Elsevier Butterworth Heinemann, 2013, p272–293.
