= Heiko Pult =

- Born: 1968 (age 57–58); Heidelberg, Germany
- Education: Munich College of Optometry, Pennsylvania College of Optometry, Cardiff University
- Occupation: research optometrist
- Known for: research in dry eye, contact lenses, tear film and visual acuity
- Notable work: founder of Dr. Heiko Pult - Optometry and Vision Research
- Awards: Awards

Heiko Pult (born 1968, Heidelberg, Germany) is a German research optometrist, specialising in research in dry eye, contact lenses, tear film, and visual acuity. He is the CEO of Horst Riede GmbH in Weinheim, Germany, and heads a research group, Dr Heiko Pult - Optometry and Vision Research, also based in Weinheim. He is also a professor at Cardiff University.

== Career ==
Pult initially trained as a dispensing optician in the 1980s. He graduated in 1994 as an optometrist from the Munich College of Optometry. He continued his studies with a Master of Science in Optometry at the Pennsylvania College of Optometry in the United States. He graduated in 1998 alongside 40 colleagues from Austria, Switzerland and Germany, and together this group founded the Academic Society of Optometry, with Pult as founding president, to promote optometry in their home countries.

He commenced a PhD at the School of Optometry and Vision Sciences, Cardiff University, UK, focusing on research in contact lenses and tear film. After graduating in 2008, he continued his research as a visiting research fellow at the university, and as a member of the Contact Lens and Anterior Eye Research (CLAER) Unit in Cardiff. In 2018 he was appointed as Professor at Cardiff University, at the School of Biomedical & Life Sciences, and lectures at the university's Wales Optometry Postgraduate Education Center (WOPEC). He is also an Honorary Academic Fellow at the Ophthalmic Research Group, Life and Health Sciences, Aston University, Birmingham. He was subcommittee member of many reports of the Tear Film and Ocular Surface Society and is ambassador of this society too.

== Work ==
Pult's areas of research include corneas, contact lenses, blinking, eyelids, tear film, and visual acuity. He is the founder of Dr. Heiko Pult - Optometry and Vision Research, a consultancy group specialised in clinical research, mainly focused on the anterior segment of the eye including tear film, dry eye, contact lenses, vision and Best Visual Acuity Certification. The group's research caters for industry clients, including clinical research projects, reviews of current literature, and publications at scientific conferences or in peer-reviewed journals or magazines.

Pult's work has been acknowledged by different awards and nomination from various working groups. He is one of the three German ambassadors of the Tear Film and Ocular Surface Society, serving on the society's subcommittees as part of international workshops on contact lens discomfort and dry eye. He was also co-Author of the TFOS DEWS II Report and TFOS Lifestyle Report. He co-authored also the CLEAR - Evidence-based contact lens practice - Report.

Pult has also served as CEO of the clinical optometry offices of Horst Riede GmbH in Weinheim, Germany, since 1998. He is a faculty member at Johnson & Johnson's Vision Care Institute in Prague, Czech Republic, a founding member/fellow of the European Academy of Optometry and Optics (EAOO), and a fellow of the American Academy of Optometry (FAAO) and British Contact Lens Association (FBCLA).

== Awards ==
- 2017 Rolf Weinschenk Poster Prize, VDCO: Trunk L., Niedernolte B, Wolffsohn J., Bandlitz S., Pult H. Evaluation of tear meniscus height using different methods. Contact 17, VDCO, Hamburg, Germany
- 2017 BCLA Poster Prize Runner`s Up: Bandlitz S., Purslow Ch., Murphy PJ., Pult H. The Usefulness of optical coherence topography in the evaluation of LIPCOF BCLA Conference, Liverpool, UK
- 2016: 'Exceptional Investigative Ophthalmology & Visual Science Review` - honoured for 'Exceptionally Good Review' by Investigative Ophthalmology & Visual Science (IOVS)
- 2015 Peter Abel Award, bestowed by the German Contact Lens & Optometry Association (VDCO) Bandlitz S, Murphy PJ, Purslow C, Pult H. 'The Importance of the Tear Meniscus in the Tear Film' [Die Bedeutung des Tränenmeniskus innerhalb des Tränenfilms].
- 2014 BCLA Poster Prize Runners Up: Pult H. and Riede-Pult BH. Impact of Soft Contact Lenses on Lid-Parallel Conjunctival Folds
- Irving Fatt Memorial Lecture 2014, BCLA
- 2010 Poster Prize 2010 of the European Academy of Optometry and Optics: Pult H., Murphy P.J., Purslow C. The Impact of Soft Contact Lens Wear on Ocular Signs with Increasing Experience
- 2009 Peter Abel Award, bestowed by the German Contact Lens & Optometry Association (VDCO): Pult H., Purslow C., Murphy P.J. The Predictive Ability of Clinical Tests for Dry Eye in Contact Lens Wear
- 2008 Dr Schamberger Award, bestowed by the VDCO: Michel M, Sickenberger W, Pult H. The Effectiveness of Questionnaires in the Determination of Contact Lens Induced Dry Eye.
- 2007 awarded by the ministry of Baden-Württemberg, Germany for exemplary scientific networking and social commitment
- 1993 awarded by the ministry of Bavaria, Germany for outstanding social engagement in Optometry in Burkina Faso/West Africa
