= 2015 Queen's Birthday Honours (Australia) =

The Queen's Birthday Honours 2015 for Australia were announced on 8 June 2015 by the Governor-General, Sir Peter Cosgrove.

The Birthday Honours were appointments by some of the 16 Commonwealth realms of Queen Elizabeth II to various orders and honours to reward and highlight good works by citizens of those countries. The Birthday Honours are awarded as part of the Queen's Official Birthday celebrations during the month of June.

== Order of Australia ==
General division ribbon

Military division ribbon

=== Companion (AC) ===
==== General Division ====
- Professor Kym Anderson – For eminent service to higher education as a leading academic and researcher, particularly in the field of agricultural economics, to the study of international trade and poverty reduction in developing countries, and to the viticulture industry.
- Distinguished Professor Judith Clements – For eminent service to the biological sciences and to education, through seminal contributions to improving the understanding of cancers, particularly prostate cancer, as an advocate for the development of biomedical research facilities, and to the training of scientists.
- Professor Nathan Efron – For eminent service to medicine in the field of clinical optometry, particularly to vision correction and corneal physiology, as an academic, researcher and author, to the treatment of juvenile diabetes, and through executive roles with national and international professional organisations.
- The Honourable Justice Patrick Keane, QC – For eminent service to the law and to the judiciary, through contributions to improved legal and public administration, as an advocate for increased access to justice, to ethical standards, and to a range of professional organisations.
- Professor Stephen Vincent Lynch – For eminent service to medicine, particularly through major advancements in the area of liver transplantation surgery and science, as a leading clinician, to medical education and training at a national and international level, and to professional organisations.
- The Honourable Justice Chris Maxwell, QC – For eminent service to the law and to the judiciary, particularly administrative reform of the appeals process, through contributions to legal education and professional development, and as a leading supporter of human rights and civil liberties.
- Professor Stephen James Simpson – For eminent service to biological and biomedical science as an educator, researcher and author, particularly in the areas of human nutrition, obesity and metabolic disease, to higher education, and through roles with a range of professional scientific organisations.
- Richard "Dick" Smith, AO – For eminent service to the community as a benefactor of a range of not-for-profit and conservation organisations, through support for major fundraising initiatives for humanitarian and social welfare programs, to medical research and the visual arts, and to aviation.

=== Officer (AO) ===
==== General Division ====
- Paul Vincent Abbott – For distinguished service to clinical dentistry, and to higher education, as an academic, researcher and author, to endodontics as a practitioner, and to professional organisations.
- Barry John Allen – For distinguished service to biomedical physics, particularly to radiation oncology and the development of innovative methods of cancer treatment, and to international professional scientific associations.
- Cheryl Ruth Barker – For distinguished service to the performing arts as an operatic soprano, as a mentor and role model, and through fundraising support for educational opportunities for the next generation of opera singers.
- John William Boldeman – For distinguished service to nuclear science and technology, particularly through the design and construction of the Australian Synchrotron particle accelerator, and as a mentor of young scientists.
- Simon Gareth Burke – For distinguished service to the performing arts as an actor, singer and producer, and through senior advocacy roles for performers' rights and access to professional development and education programs.
- Terence Ross Carney – For distinguished service to higher education as an academic, researcher and author, to the law and social welfare, and through leadership roles with national and international legal organisations.
- Lesley Irene Chenoweth – For distinguished service to higher education, particularly in the area of social work, as an academic and administrator, and as a leading supporter of people living with disabilities.
- William Peter Coleman – For distinguished service to the print media industry as a noted editor, journalist, biographer and author, to the Parliaments of Australia and New South Wales, and to the community.
- Peter Coleman-Wright – For distinguished service to the performing arts as an operatic baritone, as a mentor and role model for young singers, and through fundraising support for opera companies.
- Allan William Cripps – For distinguished service to tertiary education as a senior administrator, and to public health as a leading immunologist, academic and researcher in the area of mucosal immunisation.
- Bulent Hass Dellal OAM, Vic – For distinguished service to the multicultural community through leadership and advisory roles, to the advancement of inclusiveness and social harmony, to youth, and to the broadcast media.
- Thomas Stephan Dery – For distinguished service to the not-for-profit sector, particularly to cancer research, through the development of corporate governance structures and major fundraising initiatives, to the performing arts, and to business.
- David Russell Eiszele – For distinguished service to public administration in Western Australia, particularly to the electricity supply and natural gas sectors, to policy development and reform, and to eye-health research.
- Paolo Ferrari – For distinguished service to medicine in the discipline of nephrology, as a clinician scientist, to the establishment of innovative renal transplantation programs, and to medical education.
- Paula Grace Fox – For distinguished service to the community through philanthropic contributions to, and committed fundraising support and advocacy for, a range of arts, cultural, youth, research and social welfare organisations.
- Richard Townsend Gun – For distinguished service to medicine, particularly in the field of occupational health and safety, and to socially disadvantaged communities in regional Australia and Timor-Leste.
- Sarah Jane Halton PSM – For distinguished service to public administration, particularly to the health and aged care sectors, through the development and implementation of public policy, and to professional national and international organisations.
- Douglas Warrington Henderson – For distinguished service to medicine, particularly anatomical pathology, as a clinician and diagnostician, and to education as an academic and author in the field of asbestos-related diseases.
- Lauren Elizabeth Jackson – For distinguished service to basketball as an athlete at the national and international level, as a mentor for women in sport, and as a supporter of a range of cultural and social welfare groups.
- Alan Peter Jeary – For distinguished service to engineering, particularly in the building and construction industry, to higher education, and through roles with a range of national and international professional organisations.
- Nigel George Laing – For distinguished service to medicine in the field of neuromuscular disorders, as an academic and researcher, to medical education, and through contributions to professional associations.
- Christopher John Legoe QC – For distinguished service to the law and to the judiciary, to the development of professional standards and legal education, and to historical, artistic and environmental conservation groups.
- Paul Anthony Lennon – For distinguished service to the Parliament and community of Tasmania, to economic diversification and sustainability, to improved social welfare opportunities, to major infrastructure development, and to reconciliation.
- Alastair Field Lucas AM – For distinguished service to medical research and administration, through leadership and philanthropic support roles, to global public health and animal welfare, and to the finance and banking industries.
- Allan Luke – For distinguished service to higher education, particularly in the areas of literacy, curriculum reform, educational policy, applied linguistics and sociology, and to improved learning outcomes for Indigenous students.
- Ross David Milbourne – For distinguished service to higher education, to academic leadership and administration, to the promotion of excellence in teaching and research, as an economist, and to professional tertiary learning associations.
- Rupert Hordern Myer AM – For distinguished service to the visual and performing arts, through governance roles with leading cultural institutions, as a supporter and benefactor, to the promotion of philanthropy, and to the community.
- Gary Roy Nairn – For distinguished service to the Parliament of Australia, to the communities of New South Wales and the Northern Territory, to the surveying and spatial sciences, and to disability support groups.
- Hugh David Niall – For distinguished service to biomedical science, particularly in the field of hormone sequencing, to higher education and research commercialisation initiatives, and to student development programs.
- Monica Viviene Oliphant – For distinguished service to the renewable energy sector as a research scientist, particularly through pioneering roles in solar photovoltaics and power generation, and to national and international organisations.
- Philippa Eleanor Pattison – For distinguished service to higher education, particularly through contributions to the study of social network modelling, analysis and theory, and to university leadership and administration.
- Finn Axel Pratt PSM – For distinguished service to public administration, to social policy development and government service delivery reform, and to care and support for people with a disability, their families and carers.
- Lynette Maree Roberts AM – For distinguished service to community health through executive and governmental advisory roles in a range of public outreach and education initiatives aimed at improving cardiovascular wellbeing.
- Peter Damian Scanlon – For distinguished service to the community through philanthropic contributions to, and senior roles in, organisations and programs that foster social cohesion and the public benefits of diversity.
- Kerry Elizabeth Schott – For distinguished service to business and commerce through a range of public and private sector finance roles, to leadership in the delivery of government infrastructure projects, and to the community.
- Helen Elizabeth Silver – For distinguished service to public administration, particularly through innovation and whole-of-government coordination, to business and commerce, and to the community of Victoria.
- Karen Simmer – For distinguished service to medicine in the field of paediatrics, particularly neonatal and perinatal nutrition, to medical education as an academic, researcher and clinician, and to the community.
- Pierre William Slicer QC – For distinguished service to the judiciary and to the law, nationally and in the Pacific, to social justice and policy reform as a civil libertarian, and to the legal profession.
- Malcolm Walter Speed – For distinguished service to sport, particularly to cricket, through leading administrative and developmental roles, at the national and international level, to legal education, and to professional associations.
- John Douglas Story – For distinguished service to business and commerce through a range of corporate governance roles, as an industry leader and mentor in the public and private sectors, to the law, and to professional organisations.
- Kirsty Sword Gusmão – For distinguished service to Australia-Timor-Leste relations through the development of mutual cooperation and understanding, particularly in the education sector, and as an advocate for improved health and living conditions for the Timorese people.
- Peter James Taylor – For distinguished service to education, and to youth, particularly through the development of mathematical competitions and challenges for students, as an academic, and to professional learning associations.
- Deborah Jane Terry – For distinguished service to education in the tertiary sector through senior administrative roles, as an academic and researcher in the field of psychology, and as a mentor.
- Richard William Vincent – For distinguished service to the beef cattle industry through leadership roles with state, national and international livestock organisations, and to thoroughbred horse breeding and racing.
- Elvie Marelyn Wintour-Coghlan – For distinguished service to medical science in the field of physiology, particularly in the area of maternal and child health, to education as an academic, mentor and researcher, and to professional organisations.

=== Member (AM) ===
==== General Division ====
- David Sydney Abraham – For significant service to the community through health and medical research, education, and corporate governance organisations.
- Carla Lee Anderson – For significant service to people who are deafblind, through advocacy, support and service delivery roles, and to interpreter training.
- Marjorie Anderson – For significant service to the public relations and marketing sectors, to professional associations, and to education and training.
- William Richard Armstrong – For significant service to the commercial music recording industry through pioneering roles, and to the broadcast media sector.
- Clive Norman Austin – For significant service to people with disabilities, particularly rehabilitation program delivery, to the not-for-profit sector, and to the community.
- Ronald William Barry-Cotter – For significant service to the maritime construction industry, to powerboat racing, and as a benefactor and supporter of charitable organisations.
- Professor David Arthur Battersby – For significant service to tertiary education, as a senior administrator and academic, and as an advocate for improved community engagement.
- The Honourable Justice Robert James Benjamin – For significant service to the judiciary and to the law, to legal education, mediation and arbitration, and to professional standards.
- Stephen John Biddulph – For significant service to community health, particularly in the fields of child and adolescent psychology, and as an author and educator.
- Margaret Ann Black – For significant service to education, through leadership and governance roles, and to the fostering of improved learning outcomes for students.
- Judith Maree Boland – For significant service to secondary education in the Northern Territory, as a supporter of historical and heritage organisations, and to the community.
- Kevin James Brasch – For significant service to rugby league football, at the local, state and national level, to primary education, and to school sports.
- Professor Bruce James Brew – For significant service to medicine, particularly the neurological impacts of HIV/AIDS, as a clinician and researcher, and to medical education.
- Barry Desmond Buffier – For significant service to public administration through senior roles in the environment protection, primary industry, and state development sectors.
- Marion Anne Burgess – For significant service to science in the field of acoustics, particularly noise management, and to professional scientific organisations.
- Peter Myles Burnett – For significant service to the tourism and hospitality sector at the state and national level, and as a supporter of charitable and sporting groups.
- Dr Gordon Geoffrey Cable – For significant service to aerospace medicine, as a practitioner, to public health education, and to professional medical bodies.
- Maureen Patricia Cahill – For significant service to the visual arts, as a leading practitioner and promoter of contemporary glass art, and as an educator and mentor.
- Andrew Michael Cannon – For significant service to the community through fundraising and support roles with a range of organisations, and to Indigenous youth education.
- Carmelo Caruso – For significant service to the Italo-Australian community, to the promotion of cross-cultural relations, as a journalist, and to migrant families.
- Emeritus Professor Robert Walter Cattrall – For significant service to science, particularly analytical chemistry, as an academic, educator, researcher and author, and to cricket.
- John Joseph Cauchi – For significant service to the law, and to international relations, through leading public administration and legal roles in the South Pacific.
- Keith Frederick Chapman – For significant service to people with a disability, at the state and national level, to the judiciary, and to the community of Western Australia.
- Dr Barry Eastwood Christophers – For significant service to the Indigenous community through advocacy roles, and to medicine as a general practitioner.
- Dr Russell Donald Clark – For significant service to geriatric and rehabilitation medicine, and to international relations, as a clinician and educator in Asia and Africa.
- Samuel Stuart Clark – For significant service to the law, through senior roles with professional legal bodies, to strategic reform, and to the rural fire service.
- Michael Mervyn Clarke – For significant service to public health, particularly to HIV/AIDS awareness, to public administration, and to the community of Tasmania.
- Peter Stewartson Cockbain – For significant service to electrical engineering, particularly in the mining and energy sectors, and to professional organisations.
- Barry Frederick Collins – For significant service to chemical engineering, through contributions to the mining, paper, and steel industries, and to the community.
- Emeritus Professor Jann Patricia Conroy – For significant service to environmental science, particularly climate change and plant growth, as an academic, and as a mentor of young scientists.
- Dr Catherine Mary Crock – For significant service to medicine, particularly to improved patient and family care and community healthcare standards, and to the arts.
- Distinguished Professor Stuart Duncan Cunningham – For significant service to higher education, particularly to the study of media and communications, as an academic and researcher.
- Dianne Margaret Davidson – For significant service to the wine making industry, to horticultural management science, and to higher education administration.
- Adrianus De Bruin – For significant service to business, particularly to the timber and forestry sector, to the beef cattle industry, and to regional development.
- Susie Elelman – For significant service to the not-for-profit sector through major fundraising roles with a range of organisations, and to the broadcast media industry.
- Andrew Edwin Fairley – For significant service to the community through contributions to, and support for, a range of organisations, to the law, and to philanthropy.
- The Honourable Patrick Francis Farmer – For significant service to the community through fundraising support for charitable organisations, to ultra-marathon running, and to the Parliament of Australia.
- Ronald Arthur Finlay – For significant service to the law, particularly in the area of dispute resolution, through public infrastructure advisory roles, and to baseball.
- Dianne Blair Foggo – For significant service to tertiary education administration and development, to the advancement of women, and to industrial relations.
- Margot Elizabeth Foster – For significant service to sports administration and governance at the state and national level, as an elite athlete, and through support for women in sport.
- Stephen Anthony (Tony) Foster – For significant service to local government through leadership roles, to professional governance associations, and to the community of Brighton.
- Catherine Winifred Fowler – For significant service to the performing arts, particularly to youth and children's theatre, as a creative director and producer, and to education.
- Emeritus Professor David Ross Fraser – For significant service to tertiary science education, as an academic and researcher, and to the study of human disease and domestic animal production.
- Duncan Alistair Fraser – For significant service to primary industry, particularly agriculture, to professional associations, and to education and training.
- Roderick Douglas Fraser – For significant service to secondary education, to national and international learning development organisations, and to the community.
- Diane Elspeth Gardiner – For significant service to public administration, particularly in the heritage preservation and historical museum sectors, and to education.
- Julian Gardner – For significant service to the community through leadership roles with social welfare, mental health, legal aid and other legal organisations.
- The Reverend Dr Keith Vincent Garner – For significant service to the community as an advocate for people who are homeless and socially disadvantaged, and to pastoral care.
- Professor Ian Ronald Gough – For significant service to medicine as a clinician, to education as an academic, researcher and author, and through medical advisory roles.
- Ronald Graham – For significant service to rugby union football as an administrator at the state, national and international level, as a player, and to the community.
- Adjunct Professor John Charles Hamilton – For significant service to the print media as a leading journalist and editor, as an author and educator, and to the veteran community.
- The Reverend Neil Alfred Hampel – For significant service to the Indigenous communities of South Australia, and to the Lutheran Church through pastoral care roles.
- Valmai Audrey Hankel – For significant service to library and information services, particularly in South Australia, and to the wine industry as a writer.
- Professor Ian Andrew Harris – For significant service to medicine, particularly in the field of orthopaedics as a clinician, to education and research, and to professional bodies.
- Dr Dennis James Haskell – For significant service to literature, particularly poetry, as an academic, author, editor and critic, to tertiary education, and to inter-cultural understanding.
- Rhonda Clare Hawkins – For significant service to higher education through governance and leadership roles, and as an advocate for social justice and gender equity.
- Dr Hugh Hazard – For significant service to sports medicine as a physician, through contributions to professional medical groups, and to rugby league football.
- Professor Annemarie Hennessy – For significant service to tertiary education, and to medical research, particularly in the area of clinical hypertension and maternal health.
- Dr Michael McKenzie Henry – For significant service to the not-for-profit and cultural sectors through a range of roles, to business governance standards, and to the community.
- Clinical Professor Richard Peter Herrmann – For significant service to medicine, particularly to haematology as a clinician, to bone marrow transplantation services, and to education.
- Stephen Francis Higgs – For significant service to community health through leadership roles with medical research organisations, particularly to juvenile diabetes.
- Professor Ross Beresford Holland – For significant service to medicine in the discipline of anaesthesia, as a clinician, to healthcare standards, and to professional medical bodies.
- John Anthony Howie – For significant service to the community of Victoria, particularly through leadership of film, arts and sporting organisations, and to the law.
- Kay Elizabeth Hull – For significant service to the Parliament of Australia, and to the community of the Riverina as a leader and advocate.
- Dr Alan Isaacs – For significant service to medical education, particularly in the field of ophthalmology, and to professional organisations.
- Laurie Edmond James – For significant service to the law, particularly alternative dispute resolution, as a practitioner, and to professional organisations.
- Dr Jennifer Ann Johns – For significant service to medicine, particularly cardiology, as a physician, researcher and mentor, and to the not-for-profit sector.
- Mark Jones – For significant service to medical research through leadership and executive roles in not-for-profit organisations.
- Dr Anthony John Keller – For significant service to medicine, particularly transfusion and blood donor services, as a specialist, and through executive roles.
- John Eliott Kilpatrick – For significant service to the Greater Newcastle community, through leadership of social welfare organisations, and to local government.
- Dr Timothy Rex Kuchel – For significant service to veterinary science, particularly the humane care and treatment of animals in research activities.
- Professor Brij Vilash Lal – For significant service to education, through the preservation and teaching of Pacific history, as a scholar, author and commentator.
- Dr Michael William Lanigan – For significant service to medicine as a plastic and reconstructive surgeon, and through charitable and professional organisations.
- Henry Lanzer – For significant service to the community, particularly through a range of educational, research and arts organisations, and to the law.
- The Honourable Justice Lex Lasry – For significant service to the law, through pro bono advocacy and legal professional organisations, and to the judiciary.
- Richard John Lee – For significant service to business and commerce through a range of executive roles, and to sporting and charitable groups.
- Conjoint Professor Florence Levy – For significant service to medical education through seminal contributions to child and adolescent psychology research.
- Patrick John Lindsay – For significant service to the media as a television presenter and journalist, to international relations, and to literature as an author.
- The Reverend Graham Stuart Long – For significant service to the community through the provision of support to vulnerable and marginalised people in society.
- Dr Paul Graham Luckin – For significant service to the community through emergency medicine, and as an authority on survivability in search and rescue operations.
- Professor Robert James Lusby – For significant service to medicine as a cardiovascular surgeon and clinician, and to medical education and research as an academic and educator.
- Anthony David Mackay – For significant service to education through reform in the teaching profession, leadership in curriculum development and innovation in assessment and reporting.
- Associate Professor John Richard (Jack) Mackay – For significant service to medicine in the field of colorectal surgery, to clinical governance, and to professional organisations.
- Karen Mahlab – For significant service to the community through support for the not-for-profit sector and contributions to philanthropic initiatives.
- Lucy Marshall – For significant service to the community as an elder and leader, as an advocate for Indigenous Australians, and as a mentor to women in Derby.
- Elliot McAdam – For significant service to the community of Barkly, and to the Legislative Assembly of the Northern Territory.
- Catherine Jane Miller – For significant service to the community through social welfare organisations that support children and young people.
- Geoffrey Keith Morgan – For significant service to the Scouting Movement, and to the community through executive roles in business, Indigenous education and sporting organisations.
- William James Murray – For significant service to primary industry, particularly through the development of grain storage, export, and quality assurance programs.
- Robert Tasman Nation – For significant service to architecture and environmental design as a practitioner, to higher education, and to professional organisations.
- Graeme John Neate – For significant service to the law as a leading contributor to Indigenous land rights, and to legal education.
- Dr Ralph William Neller – For significant service to dentistry as a clinician, to improved community oral health outcomes, and to professional dental associations.
- Dr Anh-Tuan Ngo – For significant service to veterans and their families, as a supporter of ex-service groups, and to the Vietnamese community of South Australia.
- Professor Murray David Norris – For significant service to medical research as a molecular biologist, and through pioneering development of treatments for cancer in children.
- Dr William Terry O'Brien – For significant service to maritime engineering, to the development of innovative marine navigation equipment, and to education.
- Michael John Ockwell – For significant service to conservation and the environment, particularly in the Willandra Lakes Region World Heritage Area.
- Valerie Christine Parv – For significant service to the arts as a prolific author, and as a role model and mentor to young emerging writers.
- Keith Payne – For significant service to veterans and their families as an ambassador, patron and as an advocate for veterans' health and welfare.
- Dr William John Peasley – For significant service to the community as an inland explorer, historian and author, and as a general practitioner.
- Dr Clifford Walter Pollard – For significant service to medicine in the field of trauma care, and through contributions to health policy and reform in Queensland.
- The Honourable Michael Robert Polley – For significant service to the Parliament of Tasmania as Speaker of the House of Assembly, and to the community.
- Dr George Edward Rayment – For significant service to the primary industry sector through a range of expert roles in soil and plant analysis and research.
- Norman Stephen Reaburn – For significant service to the law, particularly through equality of access to legal and social justice in Tasmania.
- Lesley Ann Reece – For significant service to children through improving literacy skills and promoting Australian authors and illustrators.
- Archibald William Roach – For significant service to the performing arts as a singer, song-writer and guitarist, and to the community as a spokesman for social justice.
- Dr Robert Neil Roy – For significant service to medicine in the field of paediatrics, particularly through the development of neonatal transport services.
- Peter Mark Schouten – For significant service to the visual arts as a wildlife and scientific illustrator, and to the preservation and documentation of Australian natural history.
- Morris Zoltan Schwartz – For significant service to the print media industry as a publisher, and to the community through promoting Australian political and intellectual discourse.
- Anne-Marie Lucienne Schwirtlich – For significant service to the library and archives sector through leadership roles at state and national level, and to professional information management organisations.
- Professor John Francis Seymour – For significant service to medicine in the field of haematology, through a range of senior appointments in blood and bone marrow cancer research.
- Sabina Jane Shugg – For significant service to the mining industry through executive roles in the resources sector, and as a role model and mentor to women.
- Dr Robyn Joyce Sloggett – For significant service to the arts in the field of cultural heritage management and preservation as an academic, conservator and adviser.
- Helen Leslie Smith – For significant service to fencing as an Olympic athlete, coach and mentor, and through a range of leadership and administrative roles.
- The Honourable Susan Lynette Smith – For significant service to local government and the Parliament of Tasmania through leadership roles, and as a role model for women in politics.
- Dr William Hugh Smith – For significant service to higher education as an academic and researcher in the field of military sociology, and to the community.
- Margaret Ann Springgay – For significant service to community health, particularly through leadership and advocacy roles in the area of mental health services.
- David Alan Stanton – For significant service to the community through programs to improve the mental, emotional and social wellbeing of young Australians.
- Denis William Strangman – For significant service to community health through advocacy, public policy, and support organisations for people with brain tumours.
- Anthony Jona Tate – For significant service to the community through senior roles in peak Jewish welfare, advocacy and sporting organisations, and to tertiary education.
- Russell Charles Taylor – For significant service to the community as a cultural leader and public sector executive in the field of Indigenous affairs.
- Robert Norman Thompson – For significant service to the thoroughbred racing industry as an ambassador, a champion rider, and mentor to apprentice jockeys.
- Merle Estelle Thornton – For significant service to the community as an advocate for women, and Indigenous rights, and to the arts as a writer and director.
- Arvo Tinni – For significant service to engineering through contributions to the road construction sector, as an industry leader, innovator and mentor.
- Associate Professor Kevin Gerard Tolhurst – For significant service to science through land and bushfire management, and to the community through providing expert advice at fire emergencies.
- Robert Neville Tolson – For significant service to agriculture and food production as a mushroom farmer and industry leader, and to the community.
- David John Tongway – For significant service to science and research in the area of land management through the development of Landscape Function Analysis.
- Bruce Ronald Turner – For significant service to public administration through contributions to governance and risk management practices, and to the profession of internal auditing.
- John Albert Turner – For significant service to the community through policy direction and reform in public administration, and the social welfare sector, and to cricket.
- Heloise Racheal Waislitz – For significant service to the community through charitable and philanthropic support in the areas of health and social welfare.
- Graham Francis Walker – For significant service to veterans, particularly those who served in Vietnam, and their families as a researcher, author and spokesperson.
- The Honourable John Arthur Watkins – For significant service to the community through leadership positions with health organisations, to tertiary education, and to the Parliament of New South Wales.
- Stanton De Burgh Welch – For significant service to the performing arts as a ballet dancer, mentor, choreographer and artistic director.
- Janet Mary Whiting – For significant service to the community through contributions to the arts, health and major events sectors, and as a legal professional.
- Craig Whitworth – For significant service to sailing as a yachtsman, a sail maker and sponsor of youth training programs, and to business in the retail sector.
- Mary Therese Williams – For significant service to nursing as an advocate and spokesperson for post natal depression, and as a mental health administrator and clinician.
- Warren Robert Wilson – For significant service to business and commerce through the sports entertainment industry, and to the community of Western Sydney.
- Professor Fredrick Clive Wright – For significant service to dentistry, particularly in the area of population oral health, as an academic, educator, administrator and research scientist.
- Dr Bevis Graham Yaxley – For significant service to education in Tasmania, particularly through curriculum development, as an administrator and academic.

==== Military Division ====
===== Navy =====
- Rear Admiral Mark Gerard Campbell, CSC, RAN – For exceptional service as Head, Navy Capability and as a senior leader in the Royal Australian Navy aviation community.
- Commodore Adam Lloyd Grunsell, CSC, RAN – For exceptional performance of duty in the field of Navy warship maintenance and support.
- Captain Brett Chandler, RAN – For exceptional service to the Australian Defence Force, for peacekeeping operations with the United Nations, Command of HMAS Creswell, dedication to Navy leadership training, and as Commander of Shore Force between 2008 and 2014.

===== Army =====
- Brigadier Wayne Gregory Budd, CSC – For exceptional service as Director General Headquarters Joint Operations Command Project and Commander of the Counter Improvised Explosive Device Task Force.
- Brigadier Peter Campbell Gates, CSM – For exceptional performance of duty as Director General Defence Education and Training, Director General Defence Learning Branch, and Commandant Australian Command and Staff College.
- Brigadier Darren Scott Naumann – For exceptional service as Director General Capital Facilities and Infrastructure, Infrastructure Division, Defence Support and Reform Group, Department of Defence.
- Lieutenant Colonel G – For exceptional service in officer career management, development of strategic capability, and for command and leadership in the Special Air Service Regiment.

===== Air Force =====
- Air Vice-Marshal William Francis Henham, OAM – For exceptional service to the Australian Defence Force in coalition planning, command and control of joint air operations, and strategic capability development.
- Air Commodore Warren George McDonald, CSC – For exceptional performance of duty as Officer Commanding Number 92 Wing, Director General Capability Planning – Air Force, and Commander of Air Mobility Group.
- Group Captain Fiona Dorothy Dowse – For exceptional service to the Royal Australian Air Force in senior personnel management and international engagement.

=== Medal (OAM) ===
==== General Division ====
- Marie Frances Adams – For service to the community of Belmont, particularly through the Australian Red Cross.
- Pam Adams – For service to the community of Seaham.
- Robert Errol Adams – For service to the community of Seaham.
- Patricia Mary Alderman – For service to the community of the Hunter Valley.
- Sue Christina Aldridge – For service to the community of Numurkah.
- Craig Alexander – For service to sport as a triathlete, and to the community.
- Karen Ruth Alexander – For service to conservation and the environment, and to the community.
- Charles McPherson (Chas) Allen – For service to people with a disability.
- Grant Jackson Alley – For service to the performing arts, particularly theatre.
- Kevin John Andrews – For service to the community of the Central Coast.
- Irene Anestis – For service to the Greek community of New South Wales.
- Roy Lewis Arnott – For service to the preservation of military history, and to veterans.
- Dr Adel Asaid – For service to medicine as a general practitioner, and to the community of Bendigo.
- Dr Philip Stephen Bachelor – For service to the community, to the environment, and to cemetery management.
- Albert John Baker – For service to veterans, and to the community.
- Trevor Paul Baker – For service to basketball, particularly through administration roles.
- Maxwell Allen Baldwin – For service to sport, particularly through contributions to gymnastics and canoeing.
- James Robert Banks – For service to veterans and their families, and to the community.
- Heather Jean Barnes – For service to early childhood education.
- Warren John Barnes – For service to veterans and their families.
- Rita Daisy Barnett – For service to the community through charitable and veterans organisations.
- Raymond James Barry – For service to the cold storage industry, and to the community.
- Dr Vecihi (John) Basarin – For service to Australia-Turkey relations, to military history, and to the community.
- Marjorie Yvonne Batchelor – For service to nursing, and to international outreach programs.
- Stephen John Becsi – For service to the aged care industry.
- Joyce Mary Bennett – For service to music as a teacher, fundraiser and mentor.
- Noel William Bennett – For service to local government, and to the community of the Lachlan shire.
- Arthur Benjamin Bentley – For service to the community of Warracknabeal.
- Graham Leonard Berry – For service to the community through volunteer roles with service organisations.
- Ronald Sydney Birch – For service to the finance and banking industries.
- Catherine Mary Birrell – For service to nursing, particularly to professional education, and to the community.
- Paul Thomas Biscoe – For service to the community through volunteer roles with a range of organisations.
- Dr John Bruce Blackwell – For service to medicine, to professional organisations, and to medical education.
- Marion Helena Blair – For service to local government, to the community of Perth, and to women.
- Dr Philip Laurence Bliss – For service to the community through Jewish and multi-faith organisations.
- Graeme John Board – For service to primary industry, and to the community of Dubbo.
- Henry James (Ted) Books – For service to local government, and to the community of the Hawkesbury.
- Yvonne Dian Booth – For service to the community of Henty.
- John Henry Bowell – For service to local government, and to the community of Kempsey.
- Beryl Fay Bracken – For service to the community of Coffs Harbour, and to sport.
- Mark William Brandon – For service to public administration, and to health and aged care standards.
- John Charles Brent – For service to local government, and to the agriculture industry.
- Stephen Paul Brown – For service to the Catholic Church in Australia, and to the community of the Australian Capital Territory.
- Kevin John Burdett – For service to local government, and to the community of Karoonda.
- Matthew Burke – For service to rugby union as a player, and to sports broadcasting.
- Julia Helen Burton Taylor – For service to youth in rural and remote areas, and to the not-for-profit sector.
- Reginald Graham Butler – For service to the community as an historian.
- Colin John Campbell – For service to the community of Inverell.
- Phillip James Carswell – For service to community health, particularly for people living with HIV/AIDS.
- Wesley Carter – For service to the community, particularly through men's health programs.
- Reginald John Chapman – For service to the community through the preservation of the history of firearms.
- Dr Glen Chittleborough – For service to chemical science, to conservation, and to community music.
- Shanlian Anita Chong – For service to foreign language education as a teacher, and to professional organisations.
- The Reverend Kay Lynette Clark – For service to the Anglican Church in Australia.
- Michael John Close – For service to the sport of model aircraft aviation.
- Justin Bernard Coburn – For service to the community, particularly to indigenous peoples nationally and internationally.
- Charles Russell Collins – For service to business, particularly to the financial planning industry.
- Brigadier Keith Royce Colwill – For service to veterans and their families.
- Beryl Ethel Connah – For service to aged-care, and to midwifery education in developing countries.
- James Robert Conroy – For service to the cattle breeding industry in Australia, and to polo.
- Janice Ethel Conroy – For service to the performing arts through dance.
- Patricia M Cooper – For service to primary education in the Australian Capital Territory.
- Paul Allan Coppock – For service to veterans and their families.
- Janet Mary Corcoran – For service to the community of Far North Queensland.
- Dr Jennifer Joan Court – For service to the community, particularly through Oxfam Australia.
- Neville Cowgill – For service to the community of Eden, and to youth.
- Dr Nickless Hugh Craft – For service to public administration, and to the community, particularly in relation to the Commonwealth of Nations.
- Lenin George Cram – For service to the Australian opal mining industry.
- Elise Jane Crofts – For service to the community of Coffs Harbour, and to youth.
- Kevin Gerard Culliver – For service to rugby union in Victoria, and to school sports.
- The Reverend Dr Harold Geoffrey Cummins – For service to the community of Nundle through a range of organisations.
- Bernard Curtin – For service to local government, to aged care, and to the community of Berrigan.
- Albert Peter Da Cruz – For service to the community of Western Australia through multicultural organisations.
- Sister Susan Mary Daily – For service to Indigenous education as a teacher, and to the visual arts.
- Stephen Anthony Damiani – For service to medical research through charitable organisations.
- Brian Richard Darby – For service to the community of Dorrigo.
- James Henry Day – For service to veterans and their families.
- Diana Cecile De Vos-Beck – For service to the performing arts through dance.
- Graeme Harold Denholm – For service to local government, and to the community of the City of Tea Tree Gully.
- Dr Anthony John Dickinson – For service to dentistry as a practitioner and as an educator in prosthodontics, and to professional associations.
- William John Disney – For service to the community of Dudley.
- Damian Joseph Dixon – For service to veterans and their families.
- Raymond Lindsay Donald – For service to local government, and to the community of Nyngan.
- Nola Marcella Dooley – For service to the community of Gresford.
- John Alfred Dredge – For service to veterans and their families, and to the community of Ipswich.
- John Stuart Drury – For service to community history through a range of roles.
- Dr Bruce Graham Drysdale – For service to dentistry, and to the community.
- Sandra Madeleine Dudakov – For service to the community of Malvern through charitable organisations.
- Glenn Bruce Dudley – For service to the agricultural society movement in New South Wales.
- Donald Fraser Duffy – For service to horse racing, and to the community of Pakenham.
- Patricia Alison Dunk – For service to the Uniting Church in Australia, and to the community.
- Brian Kevin Dunn – For service to the community of Harden.
- Margaret Jean East – For service to the performing arts through dance administration roles.
- David Anthon Elliott – For service to science, particularly palaeontology.
- Professor Niki Maree Ellis – For service to medical research, particularly to occupational and public health.
- Lynne Maree Emblin – For service to youth through the Guiding movement, and to the community.
- David Sidney Evans – For service to Australian-American relations, and to the veteran community.
- Dr John Falzon – For service to the community through social welfare organisations.
- Rick Bruce Firman – For service to local government, and to the community of the Riverina.
- Denise Marilyn Follett – For service to youth particularly through mental health organisations.
- Edgar John Ford – For service to youth, and to the Uniting Church in Australia.
- John Gregory Foreman – For service to the performing arts, particularly as a musical event director and musician.
- Prudence Forster – For service to the community through a range of charitable organisations.
- Charles William Frew – For service to community health organisations through fundraising roles.
- Colin George Gale – For service to veterans and their families, and to the community.
- John Wallace Gambrill – For service to the community, particularly through palliative care programs.
- Geoffrey Robert Gardner – For service to the community of Norfolk Island through leadership roles, and to athletics.
- Graeme Roger Gibson – For service to the community of the Hunter Valley.
- Graham Charles Gibson – For service to the community of Taree.
- Margery Gibson – For service to the community of Blackwood.
- Peter Sydney Gill – For service to the community of South Australia through a range of organisations.
- Theo Glockemann – For service to youth, particularly in Timor Leste, and to the community.
- Donald Lyon Gobbett – For service to the community through charitable organisations.
- Dr Philip Kingsley Godden – For service to medicine and to community health.
- Sister Kerry Danelle Gordon – For service to the performing arts as a teacher, and to the community of Townsville.
- Hazel Enid Green – For service to the Indigenous community of New England.
- Peter Harry Green – For service to conservation and the environment, and to local government.
- Ronald William Greer – For service to the community of Tamworth.
- Keith Matthew Grima – For service to surf lifesaving, particularly through training and administration roles.
- Julie Ann Gunn – For service to youth through the Scouting movement.
- Wayne Philip Gunn – For service to youth through the Scouting movement.
- Pamela Margaret Guyer – For service to the community of Kempsey, and to netball.
- Noel Maurice Hamey – For service to surveying and mapping, and to education.
- James Peter Hannah – For service to community music on the Mid North Coast.
- John Edward Hardwick – For service to the community of South Perth, and to local government.
- Henrietta Hardy – For service to the community through volunteer roles with Jewish organisations.
- Allan John Harriman – For service to the building and construction industry through professional associations.
- Lesley Patricia Hawkins – For service to the community through horticulture, church and social welfare groups.
- Wendy Anne Hayes – For service to Australian-American relations.
- Philip Hugh Haynes – For service to veterans and their families.
- Douglas Thomas Herps – (Award wef 15 August 2014) For service to the preservation of Australian military history.
- Donald Kevin Hicks – For service to lawn bowls, and to sport in the Echuca region.
- Mark Anthony Hill – For service to the agricultural and livestock industries, and to the community of Tarlee.
- Norma Patricia Holdorf – For service to the community, particularly through family history and ex-service organisations.
- Dr David George Hollands – For service to medicine as a general practitioner, and to ornithology.
- Julie Ann Holschier – For service to nursing, particularly lactation education.
- Barbara Joan Hovard – For service to local government, and to the community of Maryborough.
- Dr David Howe – For service to children's health, and to the community of Orange.
- Brian Atlee Hunt – For service to surveying and mapping, and to the community of the Swan Valley.
- Alan Preston Hunter – For service to veterans and their families.
- Terrence Ben Hutchings – For service to Olympic sport, particularly canoeing and kayaking, and to surf life saving.
- Teresa Mary Isaacs – For service to Indigenous health in Western Australia.
- David Brian Jacka – For service to people with a disability, particularly through sport.
- Marion Elizabeth Jarratt – For service to the community through roles with the Burrendong Botanic Garden and Arboretum.
- Catherine Hamilton Jeffree – For service to community music and arts organisations.
- Graeme Alexander Johnson – For service to the community through charitable groups.
- Barry Raymond Jones – For service to the welfare of veterans and their families.
- Vione Mae Jorgensen – For service to the community of Ipswich, and to adult education.
- Helen Geraldine Jurcevic – For service to the community, particularly to women and seniors.
- Steven James Kaesler – For service to community music through a range of roles.
- Associate Professor Alyson Margaret Kakakios – For service to medicine in the field of paediatric allergy and immunology.
- Joseph Karl Kaplun – For service to the community, and to veterans and their families.
- Isabella Sophia Kearsley – For service to the community of Rosewood.
- Patrick Richard Keast – (Award wef 4 September 2014) For service to the agricultural society movement at the state and national level.
- Marilyn Joyce Kellett – For service to the community of Berry.
- Bob Kemnitz – For service to the community of the Blue Mountains.
- Desmond Noel Kennard – For service to the visual arts, particularly to the museums and galleries sector.
- Geoffrey Craig Kimberley – For service to the tourism industry, to sporting organisations, and to business.
- Emily May Kitchener – For service to veterans and their families, and to the community of Auburn.
- Manfred Klink – For service to the community of Caloundra, and to multicultural music.
- Carol Jean Klintfalt – (Award wef 5 November 2014) For service to community health, particularly as an advocate for people affected by asbestos-related illnesses.
- Daisy Kokkalis – For service to secondary education in New South Wales.
- Dr Patricia Jean Kotai-Ewers – For service to literature, and to people with Alzheimer's.
- Kenneth Milton Lambert – For service to the community of Vacy through a range of organisations.
- Evelyn Mary Langbein – For service to netball in New South Wales.
- Michael James Lange – For service to local government through roles with the Barossa Council.
- Ross William Lanyon – For service to thoroughbred horse racing, and to the community of Mildura.
- Shirley Olive Larney – For service to the community of Maleny.
- Margaret Agnes Lee – For service to the community through the Royal Children's Hospital.
- Lynette Marie Leerson – For service to the Indigenous community of Western Sydney, and to reconciliation.
- Emily Valda Lennie – For service to music, to musical education, and to the community.
- Wilhelm Lermer – For service to the community, particularly through the Jewish Holocaust Centre.
- Neville Joseph Lesina – For service to the community of Tweed Heads.
- Gregory Zalman Levine – For service to the law and the judiciary, to children, and to professional legal organisations.
- Malcolm Philip Levy – For service to sailing, and to architecture.
- Margaret Anne Littlehales – For service to youth through the Guiding movement, and to the Uniting Church in Australia.
- Anne Robyn Lord – For service to athletics as an administrator and competitor.
- Sandra Lunardi – For service to the community through fire and emergency service organisations.
- David Rodd Lusk – For service to the community, and to the game of bridge.
- Julie Dawn Lyford – For service to local government, and to the community of the Upper Hunter Valley.
- Dr Colin Geoffrey Macarthur – For service to medicine as a clinician, and to medical administration.
- The Reverend Robert Andrew Macintosh – For service to the community, particularly through church and veteran's organisations.
- Jan Margaret Macintyre – For service to youth through the Guiding movement, and to the community.
- Barbara Fay Maggs – For service to the community through charitable event organisation.
- James Walter Maitland – For service to local government, and to the community of Wakefield.
- Dr Ashim Kumar Majumdar – For service to the Indian community of Queensland.
- Darvill Alexander Malcolm – For service to veterans and their families, and to the community.
- Brian Dennis Martin – For service to the community through a range of volunteer roles.
- Juleen Barbara Maxfield – For service to netball.
- John Patrick McArdle – For service to the communities of Molong and Orange.
- Angela Therese McCann – For service to veterans and their families, and to the community of Coolamon.
- John Joseph McCarthy – For service to the community of Norlane through a range of social welfare organisations.
- Wendy Margaret McDougall – For service to the community of Chiltern.
- Dr Gillian McFeat Lin – For service to the community of the Australian Capital Territory.
- Charles Peter McGlinchey – For service to the communities of Kiama and the Shoalhaven.
- Anne Myrea McGovern – For service to the Indigenous communities of Mintabie and Mimili.
- John Robert (Jock) McIlwain – For service to the community of the Gold Coast through arts and educational organisations.
- Dr Gwendolyne Merna McKenzie – For service to science, particularly as a researcher.
- Dr Peter Willoughby McKerracher – For service to dentistry, to professional associations, and to dental education.
- Ian Herbert McKinnon – For service to the community of the Shoalhaven.
- Peter McMahon – For service to the community of Ipswich.
- Michael Arthur McMartin – For service to the performing arts, particularly to the music industry.
- Gregory Frederick Mead – For service to veterans and their families.
- Ross Lindsay Melville – For service to youth, and to the community.
- Raymond Paul Menhinnitt – For service to the community, particularly through swimming and water safety programs.
- Richard Reynolds Miles – For service to the community, particularly through roles with education organisations.
- Margaret Anne Millington – For service to the community of Nhill, to refugee support, and to social welfare organisations.
- James Bernard Mooney – For service to the broadcast media as a radio presenter, and to the community.
- Mary Eleanor Mortimer – For service to the communities of Pyrmont and Ultimo.
- Dr Amad Ismail Mtashar – For service to multicultural relations, and to the community of South Western Sydney.
- Nona June Mulcahy – For service to the community of Merriwa through a range of health and aged care groups.
- Dallas Phillip Mulhall – For service to the community through aged care and veteran welfare organisations.
- Commander Robert Browning Mummery – For service to youth, and to veterans organisations.
- William James Murray – For service to the community of Penola.
- Helen Margaret Musa – For service to the performing and visual arts as a critic and magazine editor.
- Gordon Leslie Nay – For service to the community of Manly.
- Peter Hutton Neve – For service to the preservation of Australian rail heritage.
- Douglas William Newall – For service to veterans and their families, and to the community of Smithfield.
- Alan Reginald Newing – For service to the community through finance roles in the age care sector.
- Marjorie Alberta Nicholas – For service to the not-for-profit sector, and to the community of Howlong.
- Anthony David Nicholson – For service to local government, and to the community of the Derwent Valley.
- Haydyn Dudley Nielsen – For service to local government, the community of Glenorchy, and to sport.
- Douglas Coulton Nolan – For service to military history, and to aviation.
- Dr Brian John Norcock – For service to rural medicine, and to the community of Naracoorte.
- Rodney Paul O'Donnell – For service to the community of Campbelltown through charitable organisations.
- Walter O'Hara – For service to gymnastics, and to education.
- James Meredith O'Ryan – For service to the community through the Prostate Cancer Foundation of Australia, and to golf.
- Dr Nicholas Gerard O'Ryan – For service to medicine as a general practitioner in the Canowindra region.
- Wendy Anne Oakes – For service to the community through music as a director, musician and teacher.
- Janet Stuart Oliver – For service to conservation and the environment, and to the community of the Mornington Peninsula.
- Hiro (Harry) Pamamull – (Award wef 24 February 2014) For service to the Indian community of Victoria.
- Darrell John Pannowitz – For service to the community of Umina.
- Francis Charles Peck – For service to education, and to professional organisations.
- Diane Mary Perkins – For service to the community, and to secondary education.
- Peter Lawrence Poland – For service to heritage preservation, and to the community of Woollahra.
- Noel Gregory Powell – For service to youth, and to the community of Redcliffe.
- Dr Shiva Prakash – For service to medicine as a general practitioner.
- Denis Winston Purcell – For service to the community through emergency response organisations.
- Rodney Edward Quantock – For service to the performing arts, and to conservation and sustainability.
- Olga Josephine Radke – For service to the community of Alice Springs.
- Fay Vera Rae – For service to the community of Camden.
- Paul John Rak – For service to golf, and to the community.
- Anthony John Ralph – For service to veterans and their families.
- Thomas Gordon Reid – For service to the community, and to people with a disability.
- Jane Laura Reilly – For service to the broadcast media, and to charitable groups.
- Lesley Marlene Reilly – For service to the community through health care advocacy and support roles.
- Edward Isaac Richards – For service to veterans and their families.
- Marina Bozica Ritossa – For service to the Royal Flying Doctor Service of Australia through fundraising endeavours, and to the international community.
- Joseph Toufic Rizk – For service to medical research, to Australia-Lebanon relations, and to the banking sector.
- Judith Anne Robbins – For service to children with a life-threatening illness and their families.
- Peter Robbins – For service to children with a life-threatening illness and their families.
- Dorothy Faye Robinson – (Award wef 23 April 2014) For service to the community of New Norfolk.
- Kevin Thomas Rose – For service to the community, and to Australian Rules football.
- Roma Lois Rubensohn – For service to youth, to the community, and to philanthropy.
- Robert Malcolm Russell – For service to lacrosse, and to the community.
- Sarah Saaroni – For service to the community, particularly through the promotion of tolerance and diversity.
- Elisabeth Lilian Sadler – For service to the community of Benalla through a range of roles.
- William Francis Sadler – For service to the community of Benalla through a range of roles.
- Sister Cecilia Edvige Salvadori – For service to the Catholic Church in Australia, and to the community of Fremantle.
- John Raymond Sanburg – For service to community health through international humanitarian programs.
- Ian George Saunders – For service to the families of Australian soldiers declared missing in action in the Korean War.
- Rodney Keith Savage – For service to youth through the Scouting movement in Victoria.
- His Honour Judge Stephen Hugh Scarlett – For service to the judiciary, to the law, and to professional organisations.
- Judith Elizabeth Schmidt – For service to veterans, and to the community of Lowood.
- Denise Marie Schumann – For service to the community through cultural heritage preservation.
- Kenneth George Shadie – For service to the film and television industries as a writer, and to veterans.
- Allan Coleman Sheldon – For service to military history, to music, and to the community of Newcastle.
- Diane Louise Shore – (Award wef 22 May 2014) For service to women's health, particularly to breast cancer support.
- Donald Spencer Slatter – For service to horse racing, and to the community of Gympie.
- Anne-Maria Slattery – For service to the community of Botany Bay, and to social welfare groups.
- Eva Slonim – For service to the community through Jewish cultural groups.
- Babette Alison Smith – For service to the community, particularly as an historian and author.
- Dr Geoffrey Paul Smith – For service to medicine, and to mental health.
- Graham Maxwell Smith – For service to surf lifesaving, and to the community.
- Keith Smith – For service to the community through emergency response organisations.
- Lizanne Margaret Smith – For service to music education as a teacher, and to the performing arts.
- Dr Tuck Meng Soo – For service to the community of the Australian Capital Territory as a medical practitioner.
- Christopher Peter Sperou – For service to aerobatic flying.
- Delphine Kay Stagg – For service to people with intellectual disabilities.
- Richard John Staniland – For service to aged care, and to the community of Ku-ring-gai.
- Derek George Stevens – For service to canoeing, and to youth through the Scouting movement.
- Noel Leslie Strohfeld – For service to local government, and to the community of Toowoomba.
- John Sullivan – For service to local government, and to the community of Narrandera.
- Christine Svenson – For service to the community of Paynesville.
- Kevin Charles Svenson – For service to the community of Paynesville.
- Thomas Henry Symonds – For service to surf lifesaving, and to the community.
- Dr Valerie Margaret Tarrant – For service to conservation and the environment, and to community history.
- Alfred Strangman Taylor – For service to the performing arts, and to the community of Gosford.
- Suzanne Thomas – For service to the community of the Hunter Valley.
- Richard Hugh Thompson – For service to veterans and naval history, and to Antarctic exploration.
- John Mcleod Thomson – For service to football at the state and national level, and to the community.
- Norma Thorburn – For service to the community of Kogarah through a range of volunteer roles.
- Joan Ticehurst – For service to the community of Inverell.
- The Honourable John Patrick Trainer – For service to state and local government in South Australia.
- Margaret Lesley Tremewen – For service to youth through the Scouting movement in Victoria, and to the community.
- Hamish Andrew Turner – For service to business, to the tourism industry, and to charitable organisations.
- Kenneth Maurice Twiddy – For service to veterans and their families, and to the community.
- Marie Irene Tysoe – For service to the performing arts, particularly as an opera singer, and to the community.
- Joan Vogels – For service to youth through the Guiding movement.
- Michael Baron Von Berg – For service to rugby union, particularly in South Australia.
- Edward John Vowles – For service to veterans and their families.
- Mary Beatrice Wakefield – (Award wef 14 November 2013) For service to the community of Launceston through social welfare organisations.
- Alan Wale – For service to the visual arts, and to craft and woodworking associations.
- Leonie Patricia Walker – For service to people with a disability, and to the community.
- Denis Walter – For service to the performing arts as a singer and entertainer, and to the broadcast media.
- David Colin Wansbrough – For service to hockey as an elite player, and to sports administration.
- Mary Anna Way – For service to the community of Adelaide through volunteer roles.
- Emeritus Professor Martin Edward Westbrooke – For service to ecology, and to environmental management.
- David George Wheen – For service to the international community through volunteer roles in Rwanda.
- Helen Amanda Wheen – For service to the international community through volunteer roles in Rwanda.
- Kathleen Carol Whelan – For service to the community of South Gippsland.
- Dr Susan Quilford White – For service to science, particularly to speleology, and to youth.
- Mervyn Victor Whybrow – For service to the community of Launceston.
- Barry Colin Williams – For service to the community, particularly through support for families.
- Dr Clive Williams – For service to psychology, and to conservation and the environment.
- Michael Floyd Williams – For service to business, particularly in the liquid natural gas sector.
- Valerie Joan Wilson – For service to the community of Mornington as an historian.
- Stephen James Wisbey – For service to the community through support for charitable organisations.
- Pauline Lesley Woodbridge – For service to women through social welfare and support organisations.
- Helen Beverley Worladge – For service to education, and to disadvantaged youth.
- Antoun Yacoub – For service to the Lebanese community of Victoria.
- Neta May Yallop – For service to the community of Canterbury.
- Robyn Rochelle Yates – For service to community health through support for people with cancer.
- Dr John Nickolas Yiannakis – For service to the Greek community of Western Australia.
- Jeannette Dorothy York – For service to the community of Drummoyne, and to local government.
- Ian James Young – For service to surf lifesaving, and to the community of Noosa.
- John Herbert Young – For service to children, and to the community of Newcastle.
- Gerard Zwart – For service to the community of Mapleton.

==== Military Division ====
===== Navy =====
- Commander Graeme Bruce Pedley, CSM, RANR – For meritorious service as Deputy Commander Mine Warfare, Clearance Diving, Hydrographic, Meteorological and Patrol Force, and Chief of Staff Amphibious and Afloat Support Group.
- Commander Roderick Charles Robinson, CSM, RANR – For meritorious service in the field of leadership, cultural change and organisational transformation, through the introduction and development of executive coaching within Navy.
- Petty Officer Amanda Louise McGrath – For meritorious service to the Royal Australian Navy in the field of Logistics support.

===== Army =====
- Lieutenant Colonel Gordon Ross Lambie, CSM – For meritorious performance of duty as the inaugural Commanding Officer of the Australian Army Band, the Director of Music – Army and the Commanding Officer of the Defence Force School of Music.'
- Major B – For meritorious service within Special Operations Command over an extended period of service.
- Major John Leslie Muir – For meritorious performance of duty as Staff Officer Grade Two Supply Chain Management at Headquarters Forces Command.
- Warrant Officer Class One Brian James Heenan – For meritorious service as Regimental Sergeant Major of the 1st Armoured Regiment, and as the Career Advisor Royal Australian Armoured Corps, Directorate of Soldier Career Management-Army.

===== Air Force =====
- Warrant Officer Wade Charles Godbee – For meritorious service as a Maintenance Manager in the Royal Australian Air Force.
- Flight Sergeant Brett Andrew Hooper – For meritorious service to the Royal Australian Air Force in the field of technical excellence in the development and sustainment of the E-7A Airborne Early Warning and Control aircraft and the KC 30A Multi Role Tanker Transport aircraft capabilities.

== Medal for Gallantry (MG) ==
Medal for Gallantry ribbon

=== Army ===
- Lance Corporal C – For acts of gallantry in action in hazardous circumstances on Operation SLIPPER, in Afghanistan in 2012.

== Distinguished Service Medal (DSM) ==
Distinguished Service Medal ribbon

=== Navy ===
- Commander Terence Michael Morrison, RAN – For distinguished leadership in warlike operations as Commanding Officer of HMAS Darwin on Operation SLIPPER in 2014.

== Commendation for Distinguished Service ==
Commendation for Distinguished Service ribbon

=== Navy ===
- Commodore Philip Spedding, DSC, AM, RAN – For distinguished performance of duty in warlike operations as Deputy Commander Joint Task Force 633 on Operation SLIPPER from 29 October 2013 to 14 May 2014.

=== Army ===
- Brigadier Michael Mahy, DSC – For distinguished performance of duty in warlike operations as Assistant Commander – Afghanistan Joint Task Force 633 on Operation SLIPPER from August 2013 to August 2014.
- Colonel Stuart Nicholas Kenny, CSC – For distinguished performance of duty in warlike operations as the Divisional Chief of Future Operations and Divisional Director of Operations Headquarters 4th Infantry Division, Regional Command South, during Operation SLIPPER, from 16 July 2013 to 9 July 2014.
- Lieutenant Colonel Ana Laura Duncan, CSC – For distinguished performance of duty in warlike operations as the Commanding Officer of Force Communication Unit Rotation 10, Operation SLIPPER, from November 2013 to July 2014.
- Lieutenant Colonel Rebecca Sue Talbot – For distinguished performance of duty in warlike operations as Commanding Officer, Force Support Unit Nine, on Operation SLIPPER in 2014.
- Major Simon Nathan Croft – For distinguished performance of duty in warlike operations as Operations and Plans Officer of the International Security Assistance Force, Special Operations Forces on Operation SLIPPER in Afghanistan from December 2013 to September 2014.
- Major R – For distinguished performance of duty in warlike operations on Operation SLIPPER from 2013 to 2014.

== Conspicuous Service Cross (CSC) ==
Conspicuous Service Cross ribbon

=== Navy ===
- Commodore Craig Douglas Bourke, RAN – For outstanding devotion to duty as Project Manager – Landing Helicopter Dock Project within the Defence Materiel Organisation.
- Captain Matthew Paul Buckley, RAN – For outstanding achievement as Director Submarine Capability, Navy Strategic Command during the period October 2012 to August 2014.
- Captain Colin Nicholas Dagg, RAN – For outstanding devotion to duty as Chief Staff Officer (Engineering) in Fleet Command during the period May 2010 to September 2014.
- Captain Allison Gai Norris, RAN – For outstanding achievement as Commanding Officer of HMAS Success and On Scene Commander for Operation SOUTHERN INDIAN OCEAN.

=== Army ===
- Colonel Kirk Edward Batty – For outstanding devotion to duty as Deputy Commander Network Operations Centre and Executive Director Service Integration and Service Management Branches Chief Information Officer Group.
- Colonel Marcus Jon Constable – For outstanding achievement as Commanding Officer of the School of Infantry.
- Colonel Jennifer Ann Woodward – For outstanding achievement as a Military Judge, Judge Advocate and Defence Force Magistrate.
- Lieutenant Colonel Paul Raymond Bassett – For outstanding achievement as Defence Materiel Organisation Liaison Officer, Headquarters Joint Operations Command, and Acting Director Military Operations and Liaison in support of operational capability.
- Lieutenant Colonel B – For outstanding performance of duty in the fields of logistics planning, support and sustainment.
- Lieutenant Colonel Tyron Adrian de Boer – For outstanding achievement in supporting the Australian Army's Chinook medium lift helicopter capability.
- Lieutenant Colonel Matthew Allan Gallagher – For outstanding devotion to duty as Staff Officer Grade One Establishment and as Acting Director Plans – Army, within Army Headquarters.
- Lieutenant Colonel Jason Stuart Groat, DSM – For outstanding achievement to the Australian Army in the field of officer career management.
- Lieutenant Colonel Jennifer Katherine Harris – For outstanding achievement as Brigade Major of the 6th Combat Support Brigade.
- Lieutenant Colonel Hugh Walter Meggitt – For outstanding achievement as Commanding Officer of the Special Operations Engineer Regiment.
- Lieutenant Colonel David Andrew Phillips – For outstanding achievement as Commanding Officer and Chief Instructor of the Army School of Electrical and Mechanical Engineering, from January 2012 to December 2014.
- Lieutenant Colonel Laura Sinclair – For outstanding achievement as Commanding Officer, Joint Health Unit North Queensland, Joint Health Command.
- The Reverend David Richard Niven – For outstanding devotion to duty as Staff Chaplain South Queensland Region, Army Headquarters.

=== Air Force ===
- Air Vice-Marshal Kenneth Noel Watson – For outstanding devotion to duty as Commander Northern Command.
- Air Commodore Andrew Craig Heap – For outstanding achievement as Commander Air Task Group in support of Operation SOUTHERN INDIAN OCEAN.
- Air Commodore Timothy Charles Innes – For outstanding achievement as Officer Commanding Number 84 Wing and Commander of Combat Support Group.
- Wing Commander Patrick James Keane, AM – For outstanding achievement as Chief Legal Officer in Military Strategic Commitments Division.
- Flight Lieutenant Cameron Finlay Warne – For outstanding devotion to duty as Aide de Camp to successive Ministers for Defence.

== Conspicuous Service Medal and Bar (CSM and Bar) ==
=== Army ===
- Lieutenant Colonel Grant Arthur Chambers, CSM – For meritorious achievement as Senior Instructor at Combat Command Wing, School of Armour.

== Conspicuous Service Medal (CSM) ==
Conspicuous Service Medal ribbon

=== Navy ===
- Commodore Peter James Leavy, RAN – For meritorious achievement as the Commander of Joint Task Force 658, Operation SOUTHERN INDIAN OCEAN from 26 March to 5 May 2014.
- Commander Troy Joshua Battishall, RAN – For meritorious service as Senior Marine Engineer Officer at Submarine Force Headquarters, HMAS Stirling, Western Australia.
- Lieutenant Commander Mark Andrew Wilson, RAN – For meritorious achievement as a Military Liaison Officer serving on Operation ASLAN as part of the United Nations Mission in South Sudan.
- Lieutenant Teri-Lee Ross, RAN – For meritorious devotion to duty as the Plans Officer and acting Operations Officer, Joint Logistics Unit (North Queensland).
- Warrant Officer Barry Vincent Brown – For meritorious devotion to duty as Fleet Warrant Officer Marine Technical (Electrical) in Fleet Command while implementing Electrical Compliance Safety Audits for HMA Ships and Submarines.
- Leading Seaman Christopher Lee Newbury – For meritorious achievement in the performance of duty as Leading Seaman Safety Management in the Navy Safety Systems Directorate.
- Able Seaman Kirstin Judith Hansch – For meritorious devotion to duty as Assistant Staff Officer Honours and Awards, Fleet Headquarters.

=== Army ===
- Colonel Jeremy Brian King – For meritorious achievement as the Deputy Commander of the Australian Contingent for Operation ASLAN and Force Headquarters Chief of Logistics, for the United Nations Mission in South Sudan.
- Lieutenant Colonel Anita Louise Gannon – For meritorious achievement as Personnel and Logistics Manager in Headquarters Joint Task Force 639.
- Lieutenant Colonel Ruth Elizabeth Perry – For meritorious achievement as Deputy Director International Logistics (Asia and Pacific) in Joint Logistics Command.
- Major Tam Malley – For meritorious achievement as Acting Commanding Officer of the 1st Signal Regiment.
- Major Richard John Moyses – For meritorious achievement as Detachment Commander and Staff Officer Grade Two Career Advisor, Career Advisory Group – Central in the Directorate of Reserve Officer Career Management – Army.
- Warrant Officer Class One Jason Graeme JarvisFor meritorious achievement as Drill Wing Sergeant Major at Royal Military College – Duntroon.
- Warrant Officer Class One Adam Stephen Lotts – For meritorious achievement as the senior Telecommunications Systems Engineer responsible for the introduction into service and operation of the Deployed Wide Area Network.
- Warrant Officer Class One Paul Walsh – For meritorious achievement as Operations Warrant Officer within the Directorate of Military Commitments – Army, Army Headquarters.
- Warrant Officer Class One Aaron Phillip Writer – For meritorious achievement as Assistant Maintenance Manager of Joint Logistics Unit (North) in providing logistic support to Operations and Units in the Northern Region of Australia.
- Warrant Officer Class Two Michael Leslie Coggan – For meritorious achievement as Company Sergeant Major of the 6th Battalion, the Royal Australian Regiment.
- Warrant Officer Class Two Carl Damon Hemberg – For meritorious achievement as the Registered Training Organisation Compliance and Standards Warrant Officer at the Warrant Officer and Non-Commissioned Officer Academy.
- Warrant Officer Class Two Jason Lee Watene – For meritorious devotion to duty as a Company Sergeant Major of the 3rd Battalion, the Royal Australian Regiment.
- Sergeant B – For meritorious achievement at the Parachute Training School.
- Sergeant Bianca June Mainella – For meritorious achievement as the inaugural Sergeant Supervisor of the Customer Service Support Team of the Army Personnel Administration Centre – Northern Territory/Kimberly.
- Sergeant Daniel Michael Marshhan – For meritorious achievement as Research, Investigation and Stocktaking Warrant Officer of the 5th Aviation Regiment.
- Corporal P – For meritorious achievement and contribution to a specialist capability.

=== Air Force ===
- Squadron Leader Kelly John Morris – For meritorious achievement as Officer in Charge Explosive Ordnance Disposal Flight at Number 1 Security Forces Squadron.
- Squadron Leader Andrew William Pickett – For meritorious devotion to duty as Facilities and Environmental Manager in the Joint Strike Fighter Project.
- Squadron Leader Anton Charles Vijkovic – For meritorious achievement as Senior Engineering Officer of Number 11 Squadron.
- Flight Lieutenant Elisha Brooke Kropp – For meritorious achievement as a Divisional Officer at the Australian Defence Force Academy.
- Flight Lieutenant Nicholas Raymond Nutt – For meritorious achievement as Tactical Airlift Operator at the Joint Electronic warfare Operational Support Unit.
- Warrant Officer Michael John Bahnisch – For meritorious devotion to duty as Acoustic Standardisation Officer for Operation SOUTHERN INDIAN OCEAN – Air Task Group during March and April 2014.
- Sergeant Christopher John Henderson – For meritorious achievement as a Quality Management System Desk Officer at Headquarters Air Combat Group.
- Corporal Jay Brian Joseph – For meritorious achievement as Technical Training Instructor and Safety Coordinator at Number 278 Squadron.
