= Jan E. Lovie-Kitchin =

Australian optometrist

Jan E. Lovie-Kitchin is an Australian optometrist, former professor at Queensland University of Technology and founder of the university's Vision Rehabilitation Centre. She was the co-developer of the Bailey-Lovie visual acuity chart.

== Biography ==
Lovie-Kitchin obtained her first degree from the Department of Optometry at the University of Melbourne in 1973 and got her master's three years later at the same place, under the guidance of Professor Ian Bailey, who had been the first optometry clinician to work at the Kooyong Low Vision Clinic in Melbourne. In 1976, she and Bailey created the Bailey-Lovie visual acuity chart, which is now used worldwide, particularly in research settings. The chart was described in 2009 as the most popular redesign of the Snellen chart.

By 1980, she became a clinical optometrist at the Victorian College of Optometry. Later she moved to Queensland, where she became a lecturer at the School of Optometry at Queensland University of Technology. In 1985, she published her first textbook. In 1992, Lovie-Kitchin was promoted to an associate professor and she completed a Ph.D. four years later.

In 1998, Lovie-Kitchin and Stephen G. Whittaker received the Garland W. Clay Award from the American Academy of Optometry (AAO), which is given to the authors of the most influential paper over the preceding five years in the journal Optometry and Vision Science. Lovie-Kitchin and Whittaker conducted research into the relationship between visual acuity and reading, coining the term acuity reserve to describe the difference between the threshold print size and the reading acuity. The AAO also named Lovie-Kitchin a Research Low Vision Diplomate in 2003. She was named a life member of the Australian College of Optometry in 2014.

Lovie-Kitchin was a consultant at the Kooyong Low Vision Clinic in Melbourne and the Low Vision Care Centre in Brisbane. In 1993 she founded the QUT Vision Rehabilitation Centre and in 2007 became a director of Vision Australia. Since retiring from her academic post in 2006, she has served as an adjunct professor at QUT and is a chairwoman of the University Human Research Ethics Committee.
