= Simmer (surname) =

Simmer is a German habitational surname for someone from Simmern. Notable people with the name include:

- Charlie Simmer (born 1954), Canadian former professional ice hockey forward
- Grant Simmer (born 1957), Australian sailor and yacht designer
- Judith Simmer-Brown, Tibetan buddhist from the United States
- Karen Simmer, Australian paediatrician
