= TFOS =

TFOS may refer to:

- Teenagers from Outer Space (role-playing game), a rules-light comedy role-playing game
- Tear Film and Ocular Surface Society, a 501(c)(3) nonprofit organization focused on eye health education
