= Jennifer Craig (academic) =

Scottish ophthalmologist

Academic background
- Education: Glasgow Caledonian University
- Thesis: Tear physiology in the normal and dry eye (1995)
- Doctoral advisor: Alan Tomlinson

Academic work
- Institutions: University of Auckland, University of Dundee

Jennifer P. Craig is a Scottish–New Zealand academic optometrist, and is a full professor at the University of Auckland, specialising in ocular surface disease.

== Academic career ==
Craig completed Bachelor of Science in optometry at Glasgow Caledonian University, followed by a Master of Science in cataract and refractive surgery at the University of Ulster. She returned to the Glasgow Caledonian University to complete a PhD titled Tear physiology in the normal and dry eye in 1995, supervised by Professor Alan Tomlinson. Craig lectured at the University of Dundee, before joining the faculty of the University of Auckland in New Zealand, rising to full professor in the ophthalmology department, where she leads the Ocular Surface Laboratory.

Craig's research focuses on dry eye disease, and meibomian gland dysfunction, and tear film dysfunction, and covers diagnosis, clinical trials, treatment and novel therapeutics. Craig has held visiting fellowships to Aston University, the University of Waterloo, the University of Montreal, and Wenzhou Medical University in China. She has been chair or vice-chair of a number of Tear Film and Ocular Surface Society working groups, and co-authored a book published by Elsevier, The Tear Film.

== Honours and awards ==
Craig was awarded a Life Fellowship of the College of Optometrists in 2019, for "her contribution to the development of the profession through teaching and education, especially in the area of ocular surface disease". Craig was appointed as a Global Ambassador for the British Contact Lens Association in 2021. She has been recognised as one of the top 60 optometry researchers in the world.

== Selected works ==
- Craig, Jennifer; Kelly K Nichols; Esen K Akpek; et al. (2017). "TFOS DEWS II Definition and Classification Report". The Ocular Surface. 15 (3): 276–283. doi:10.1016/j.jtos.2017.05.008. PMID 28736335. Wikidata Q38665717.
- J. Daniel Nelson; Jun Shimazaki; Jose M. Benitez-del-Castillo; Jennifer P. Craig; James P. McCulley; Seika Den; Gary N. Foulks (2011). "The international workshop on meibomian gland dysfunction: report of the definition and classification subcommittee". Investigative Ophthalmology & Visual Science. 52 (4): 1930–1937. doi:10.1167/iovs.10-6997b. PMC 3072158. PMID 21450914. Wikidata Q34769297.
- J P Craig; A Tomlinson (1997). "Importance of the lipid layer in human tear film stability and evaporation". Optometry and Vision Science. 74 (1): 8–13. doi:10.1097/00006324-199701000-00014. PMID 9148269. Wikidata Q53976696.
- Nichols, Jason; Mark D P Willcox; Anthony J Bron; et al. (2013). "The TFOS International Workshop on Contact Lens Discomfort: executive summary". Investigative Ophthalmology & Visual Science. 54 (11): TFOS7–TFOS13. doi:10.1167/iovs.13-13212. PMC 4686219. PMID 24058135. Wikidata Q38140828.
- Craig, Jennifer; Yen-Heng Chen; Turnbull, Philip (2015). "Prospective trial of intense pulsed light for the treatment of meibomian gland dysfunction". Investigative Ophthalmology & Visual Science. 56 (3): 1965–1970. doi:10.1167/iovs.14-15764. PMID 25678687. Wikidata Q34462573.
- Craig JP; Singh I; Tomlinson A; Morgan PB; Efron N (2000). "The role of tear physiology in ocular surface temperature". Eye. 14 ( Pt 4): 635–641. doi:10.1038/eye.2000.156. PMID 11040913. Wikidata Q73100152.
