= University of Waterloo School of Optometry and Vision Science =

School of optometry in Canada

School of Optometry and Vision Science
- Former name: School of Optometry
- Type: School
- Established: July 1, 1967
- Parent institution: Faculty of Science
- Affiliations: University of Waterloo
- Director: Dr. Stanley Woo
- Students: 90 per class
- Location: Waterloo, Ontario, Canada
- Website: uwaterloo.ca/optometry-vision-science/

The School of Optometry and Vision Science is a professional school at the University of Waterloo within the Faculty of Science. It is the only English-language optometry program in Canada; the French language Université de Montréal optometry program operates in Quebec. The school offers an accredited undergraduate Doctor of Optometry program and a Vision Science graduate degree program. It also operates two optometry clinics open to the public.

== History ==
The University of Waterloo School of Optometry opened on July 1, 1967, the Canadian Centennial. Before this time, optometrists were trained at the College of Optometry of Ontario in Toronto, which was not affiliated with any university. In those early days, the School did not have its own building and administrative offices were housed in the University’s Math building, while an optics laboratory was established in the then newly completed Biology 2 building. The clinic was established at 35 King Street North in Waterloo, an old post office building.

Dr. Edward J. Fisher, the Dean of the former College of Optometry of Ontario, served as the first director of the new school in Waterloo until he stepped down in 1975. Dr. Fisher was a leader in the field of optometry, being the first Canadian to serve as the president of the American Academy of Optometry from 1968-1970.

In 1972, the University established the Vision Science graduate program, offering a Master of Science (MSc) degree. The same year, construction began on the Optometry building on the University’s north campus, located on Columbia Street. The building was opened in the winter of 1974 and allowed for administration offices, lecture halls, research labs, and clinic facilities to be located in one place. The dedicated space allowed class size to grow from 50 students per year to 60.

A new pathway that led to a Doctor of Philosophy (PhD) degree in vision science opened in 1980. As the research activities in the school grew, further laboratory space and offices were needed, and a $3.2 million addition opened in 1995.

A 40,000-square-foot addition to the original building opened in 2009. The new wing expanded space for students with a new lecture theatre, study space, the new Witer Learning Resource Centre and a student commons space. The additional student space allowed yearly enrolment to gradually increase from 60 to 90 through the 2000s.

A downtown Kitchener satellite location of the school’s optometry clinic opened in 2010 in the University of Waterloo’s Health Sciences Campus at 10B Victoria St. S, Kitchener. The building also houses the Michael G. DeGroote School of Medicine of McMaster University and a location of the Centre for Family Medicine. The Kitchener optometry clinic offers comprehensive eye care and an optical dispensary.

The School of Optometry was renamed the School of Optometry and Vision Science in 2012. The new name was chosen to recognize the importance of the Vision Science graduate program.

Construction on the Waterloo Eye Institute, a renovation and expansion primarily of the school’s clinical space, began in 2024. The $53 million project, expected to be completed in fall 2026, will result in 68,000 square feet of new and renovated space. In addition to expanding and modernizing patient care space, it will add research space and a teleoptometry centre. The completion of the Waterloo Eye Institute will also allow the School to add six to eight student spaces a year, for a total intake of 96 to 98 first-year students starting in 2026.

Due to construction of the Waterloo Eye Institute, the Waterloo location of the school’s optometry clinic moved to an interim location at Unit C, 419 Phillip St., which opened on October 21, 2024.

== Programs ==
The School of Optometry and Vision Science offers an undergraduate Doctor of Optometry (OD) program accredited by the Accreditation Council on Optometric Education (ACOE). It also offers ACOE-accredited clinical residencies, the Advanced Standing Optometry Preparatory Program (ASOPP) for internationally trained optometrists, and research-based graduate studies programs in Vision Science.

== Doctor of Optometry Program ==
The OD program is a second-entry undergraduate program for students who have completed a minimum of three years of university-level studies in science. It is four years (nine terms) in length and prepares students to become practicing optometrists. In the first two years, students spend most of their time building their knowledge in core topics in health, disease, optics and visual sciences. Though students begin to gain clinical experience starting in first year, patient contact begins in earnest in third year. For the entirety of the fourth year, which runs for 12 continuous months, students participate in three separate, full-time clerkships in various clinical environments to prepare them for practice within Canada or the United States.

To be licensed as optometrists, students must successfully complete exams administered by the Optometry Examining Board of Canada and/or the U.S. National Board of Examiners in Optometry. They generally do this during or soon after their fourth years. Virtually all University of Waterloo students ultimately pass. To practice in Canada, candidates must also successfully complete jurisprudence exams for their provinces.

== Residencies ==
After successful completion of the OD program, students can apply to complete a residency program, which is a one-year postgraduate program designed to advance their skills in a particular clinical area. The residencies offered by the school are accredited by the ACOE and include:

- Dr. Gina Sorbara Cornea and Contact Lens Residency

- Vision Rehabilitation (Emphasis on Low Vision Rehabilitation)

- Ocular Disease (Emphasis on Glaucoma)

- Pediatric Optometry (Emphasis on Vision Therapy and Vision Rehabilitation)

== Advanced Standing Optometry Preparatory Program (ASOPP) ==
The Advanced Standing Optometry Preparatory Program (ASOPP) is designed for internationally trained optometrists to gain licensure in Canada. ASOPP replaced the International Optometric Bridging Program (IOBP) in 2022. Students who successfully complete the ASOPP program join the third year of the OD program.

== Continuing Professional Development ==
For current optometrists, the School of Optometry and Vision Science offers a variety of opportunities for continuing professional development. In addition to offering courses and certifications, the school holds two conferences a year: CE Weekend & Alumni Reunion in June, held in Waterloo, and the Waterloo Eye Institute Fall Conference and Trade Show in November, held in Markham. The Office-Based Laser and Minor Surgical Procedures for Optometrists course is also offered in a blended learning format every spring.

== Vision Science graduate programs ==
The Vision Science graduate programs provide research-based studies leading to an MSc or PhD. These programs typically take two or four years respectively of full-time study, though they can be done part time. An accelerated OD/MSc program is available for students in the Doctor of Optometry program who also want to complete a research degree. An accelerated PhD program is available for enrolled MSc students who show exceptional ability and progress.

== Optometry clinics ==
The School of Optometry and Vision Science operates two clinics open to the public: the flagship clinic in Waterloo and the Health Sciences Optometry Clinic (HSOC) in downtown Kitchener. Both locations offer comprehensive eye examinations for all ages and have on-site optical dispensaries that fill prescriptions for new eyewear and offer adjustment and repair services to current eyewear.

The clinics are staffed by upper-year students, who practice under the supervision of licensed optometrists; by residents, who are early-career optometrists being mentored to develop advanced skills in particular areas; and by experienced optometrists, including faculty.

In addition to comprehensive eye exams, the Waterloo location offers specialty services focusing on:

- Pediatric and special needs eye care

- Advanced contact lens services

- Myopia control

- Ocular disease

- Ocular imaging

- Binocular vision dysfunction

- Low vision

- Brain injury

- Sports vision

The Waterloo clinic, normally located at 200 Columbia St. W., Waterloo, moved to an interim location due to construction of the Waterloo Eye Institute. The interim location, at 419 Phillip St., Unit C, Waterloo, opened on October 21, 2024, and will remain open until construction is complete, expected to be in fall 2026.

== Research ==
Vision science is an interdisciplinary field encompassing biology, chemistry, physics, optometry, engineering, psychology, data science and medicine, in both laboratory and clinical settings. Research within the School of Optometry and Vision Science is organised around the three pillars of:

- Fundamental biosciences

- Applied studies

- Societal impact

In addition to individual faculty members’ labs, the school is home to two major research centres:

- Centre for Ocular Research & Education (CORE)

- George & Judy Woo Centre for Sight Enhancement.

The school is also a partner, along with Hong Kong Polytechnic University, in the Centre for Eye and Vision Research (CEVR), based in Hong Kong.

In 2021, the journal Clinical and Experimental Optometry ranked Waterloo’s School of Optometry and Vision Science fifth in research impact among 245 schools of optometry around the world.

== Admission to the OD Program ==
As the only English-language optometry school in Canada, admission to the OD program is competitive. Currently, 90 students are admitted into the first-year class each fall.There are a variety of academic and non-academic requirements students must meet to be admitted the OD program.

Academic requirements:

- Three or more years of university-level science studies

- Minimum overall university average of 75%

- Successful completion of prerequisite courses

- Successful completion of minimum six terms with a full course load.

Non-academic requirements:

- Optometry Admissions Test (OAT)

- CASPer test

- Admissions Information Form (AIF)

- Two confidential reference forms

- Citizenship requirements

- English-language requirements

- Job shadowing, work and volunteer experience

- Interview

The above are only the minimum requirements needed to be eligible for admission into the program. Successful applicants typically exceed all or most requirements. Once an applicant is accepted, there are other requirements they must meet:

- Criminal record vulnerable sector check

- Proof of immunizations

- Official transcripts by mid-June of the year of entry

- Completion of outstanding required courses by the end of winter term in the year of entry

== Museum of Vision Science ==
The School of Optometry and Vision Science houses the only vision science museum in Canada that is dedicated to preserving the history of vision science. Dr. Edward J. Fisher, the first director of the school and the founding curator, initiated the collection of various optometric spectacles, equipment and instruments. While the collection remains on display, the museum is currently not being actively curated and is not accepting donations of artifacts.
