= Rachel Wong =

American neuroscientist

Rachel Oi Lun Wong
- Education: Monash University; Australian National University
- Scientific career
- Workplaces: Stanford University; University of Queensland; Washington University in St. Louis; University of Washington
- Thesis: Ontogeny of the cat retinal ganglion cell layer (1985)

Rachel Wong is an American neuroscientist who is a professor of Biological Structure at the University of Washington. She studies the developmental mechanisms that determine synaptic connectivity in the central nervous system. She was elected to the National Vision Research Institute of Australia in 2018 and the National Academy of Sciences in 2021.

== Early life and education ==
Wong attended high school in Malaysia where she first became interested in physics. She would spend her lunch breaks examining living things, collected from a creek near her home, under the school microscope. Growing up, she learned to play musical instruments, much encouraged by her father. She moved to Monash University in Australia for her undergraduate degree, where she majored in physics and completed a research project in collaboration with the Biochemistry department. Specifically, her research used x-ray and neutron scattering to better understand muscular dystrophy. Wong earned her doctorate in vision science at the Australian National University. Her doctoral research, under the supervision of Professor Abbie Hughes, investigated the cellular organization and ontogeny of the cat retinal ganglion cell layer. She moved to the National Research Institute of Australia as a research associate, where she worked under Professor Abbie Hughes and Dr. David I. Vaney before moving to the United States. Wong was a C.J. Martin Fellow at Stanford University, mentored by Professor Carla J. Shatz. After a few years in the States, Wong returned to the University of Queensland as an R.D. Wright Fellow in Dr. Vaney's laboratory at the Vision, Touch and Hearing Research Center led by Professor Jack Pettigrew.

== Research and career ==
Wong joined the faculty of the Department of Anatomy and Neurobiology at Washington University School of Medicine in 1994, where she was promoted to Professor in 2004. In 2006, she moved to the University of Washington. to join the Department of Biological Structure and became the chair of department in 2017. Wong studies the developmental mechanisms that determine synaptic connectivity in the central nervous system. Her research has focussed on identifying the cellular mechanisms underlying the proper assembly of neural circuits in the vertebrate retina of a variety of species, including human, Danio rerio (Zebrafish) and mice. Wong investigates the development of neural circuitry in vivo and in vitro using cellular imaging approaches and molecular genetics.

Wong was appointed to the steering committee of the National Eye Institute Audacious Goals Initiative (AGI), a challenge which looks to identify and support the most promising research towards curing blindness. She was a Rothmans Fellow (Sydney University Endowment), an Alfred P. Sloan Fellow, an Esther A. and Joseph Klingenstein Fellow, and a Paul G. Allen Distinguished Investigator. Her research achievements in vision science are acknowledged by the Brian B. Boycott Prize (FASEB Retinal Neurobiology and Visual Processing), the Helen Keller Award (Department of Ophthalmology, University of Washington and the Lions Club of Multiple District 19), and the Friedenwald Award (the Association for Research in Vision and Ophthalmology). In 2021, she was elected to the National Academy of Sciences.

== Awards and honors ==
- 2018 Elected Fellow of the National Vision Research Institute of Australia
- 2021 Elected to the National Academy of Sciences

== Selected publications ==
- Markus Meister; Wong RO; Baylor DA; Shatz CJ (1 May 1991). "Synchronous bursts of action potentials in ganglion cells of the developing mammalian retina". Science. 252 (5008): 939–943. Bibcode:1991Sci...252..939M. doi:10.1126/science.2035024. ISSN 0036-8075. PMID 2035024. Wikidata Q44724239.
- Rachel O L Wong; Anirvan Ghosh (1 October 2002). "Activity-dependent regulation of dendritic growth and patterning". Nature Reviews Neuroscience. 3 (10): 803–812. doi:10.1038/nrn941. ISSN 1471-003X. PMID 12360324. Wikidata Q34932526.
- B Nadarajah; J E Brunstrom; J Grutzendler; R O Wong; A L Pearlman (February 2001). "Two modes of radial migration in early development of the cerebral cortex". Nature Neuroscience. 4 (2): 143–50. doi:10.1038/83967. ISSN 1097-6256. PMID 11175874. Wikidata Q28200075.
