= Max Snodderly =

Max Snodderly is an American professor of biology and ophthalmology, a Garland W. Clay Award recipient, and author of numerous research papers.

== Biography ==
Snodderly got a scholarship to attend MIT and received bachelor's and master's degrees in electrical engineering, followed by a doctorate in biology from the Rockefeller University. He completed postdoctoral training in psychology at the University of California, Berkeley and . As soon as he graduated he became faculty member at both Schepens Eye Research Institute and Harvard Medical School and was a professor of ophthalmology at the Medical College of Georgia before he came to the University of Texas. When he came there, he was appointed as professor of Nutritional Sciences in a course International Nutrition and Visual Neuroscience. In 2011 he switched his position to neurobiology and became a member of Institute for Neuroscience and the Center for Perceptual Systems.
