= Pip Pattison =

Australian academic (born 1952)

Pip Pattison AO FASSA FRSN
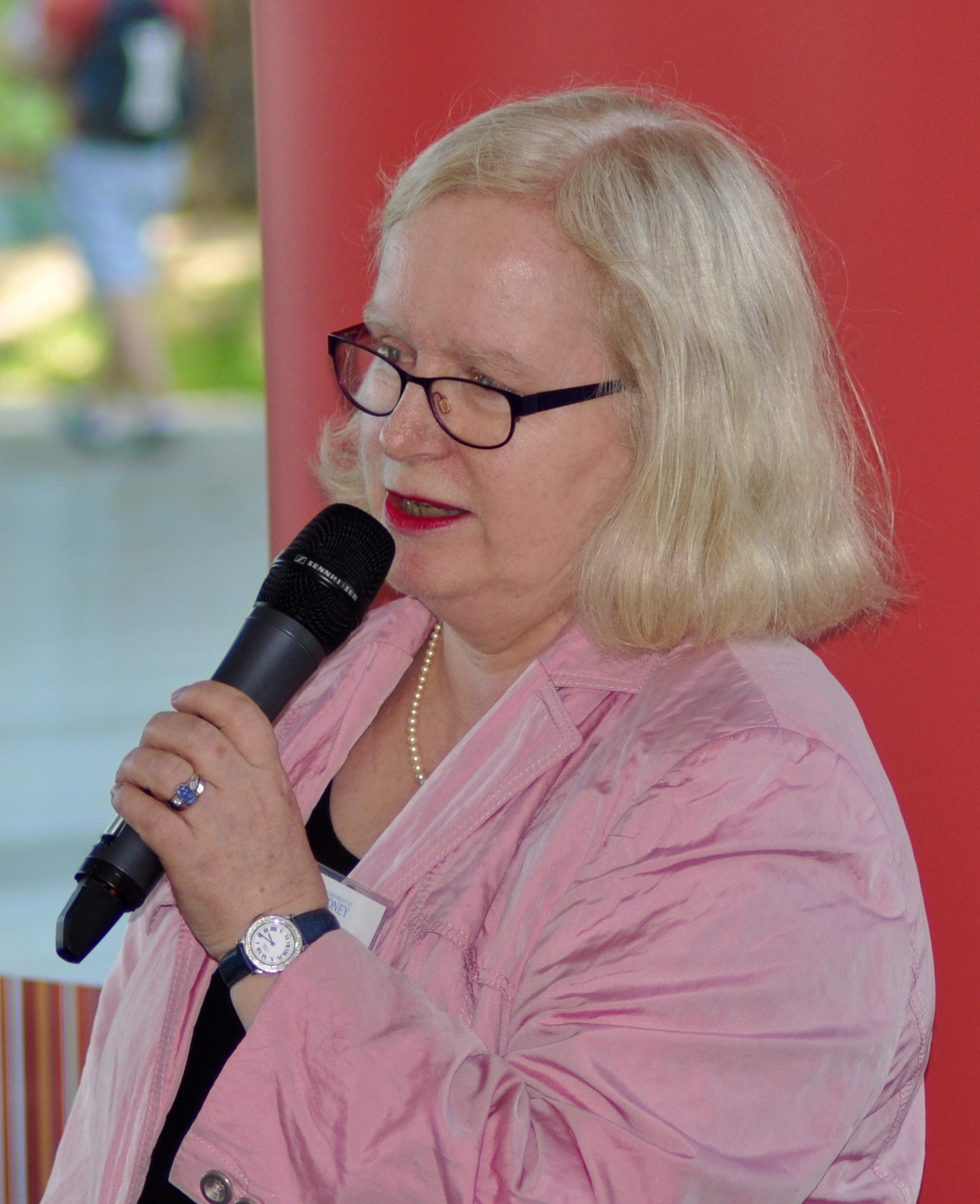
- Professor Pip Pattison speaking at the University of Sydney in 2014
- Born: Philippa Eleanor Padbury; 11 April 1952 (age 74); Perth, Western Australia
- Education: University of Melbourne
- Occupation: Quantitative psychologist
- Organization: University of Sydney
- Spouse: Ian Pattison (m. 1973)

Philippa Eleanor Pattison (born 11 April 1952) worked in the area of quantitative psychology and retired in December 2021 as the Deputy Vice-Chancellor Education at the University of Sydney. She is now an Emeritus Professor at the University of Sydney and the University of Melbourne.

== Early life ==
Pattison was born in Perth, Western Australia, and spent part of her childhood in Adelaide and Melbourne. She completed her education at the University of Melbourne, obtaining her BSc (Hons) in 1973 before being awarded a PhD in Psychology in 1980. She married Ian Pattison in 1973.

== Career ==
Pattison's full-time employment at the University of Melbourne began with a lecturing role in the Department of Psychology in 1977 while she was completing a PhD, and she continued to hold an appointment in Psychology until 2014. She was promoted to Professor in the Department of Psychology in 2000 and then took on leadership roles that included Head of the School of Behavioural Science, and Deputy Vice President, Vice President and President of the Academic Board. She became Pro Vice-Chancellor (Learning and Teaching) in 2009 and then Deputy Vice-Chancellor (Academic) in 2011. In a number of these roles she was involved in the introduction and implementation of the Melbourne Model (a restructure of the undergraduate curriculum to provide only generalist undergraduate courses and specialist postgraduate courses) and oversight of learning and teaching, including eLearning and the introduction of MOOCs to the University.

Pattison joined the University of Sydney in 2014 as Deputy Vice-Chancellor (DVC) Education. As DVC Education she is a member of the University’s senior executive group and leads the strategy for teaching and learning at Sydney.

Pattison was named on the Queen’s Birthday 2015 Honours List as an Officer of the Order of Australia for "distinguished service to higher education, particularly through contributions to the study of social network modelling, analysis and theory and to university leadership and administration".

== Research ==
Pattison’s research focuses on the development and application of mathematical and statistical models for social networks and network processes. Her work has broad application, from tracking the spread of infectious diseases to following the recovery of communities after the 2009 Victorian bushfires, and has been funded by competitive grants in Australia and the US.

Pattison has published several books and numerous book chapters and scholarly papers and is also a regular invited speaker to international conferences. She has supervised more than 30 PhD and DPsych graduates. In 1995 Pattison was elected a Fellow of the Academy of the Social Sciences in Australia. In 2014 Pattison was awarded Professor Emeritus from the University of Melbourne. She is a Fellow of the Royal Society of New South Wales.
