= Helen Silver =

Australian public servant

Silver at Melbourne Airport greeting Hillary Clinton, arriving for AUSMIN 2010

Helen Elizabeth Silver AO is Chief General Manager of the Workers Compensation Division at Allianz Australia. She was Secretary of the Victorian Government Department of Premier and Cabinet between 2008 and 2013.

Before her role at Premier and Cabinet, she worked as manager of government business at the National Australia Bank (NAB), and prior to that had been Deputy Secretary in the Department of Premier and Cabinet. Premier John Brumby's choice to appoint somebody from outside the public service surprised many and, according to some, risked upsetting senior public servants.

Silver was born in Melbourne and studied at Monash University where in 1980 she obtained a Bachelor of Economics (with first class honours) and in 1988 a Master of Economics.

In the 2015 Queen's Birthday Honours Silver was made an Officer of the Order of Australia "distinguished service to public administration, particularly through innovation and whole-of-government coordination, to business and commerce, and to the community of Victoria".
