= University of Waterloo Faculty of Science =

Academic division of the University of Waterloo, Canada

- Type: Public
- Parent institution: University of Waterloo
- Dean: Chris Houser
- Students: 6921
- Undergraduates: 6295
- Postgraduates: 626
- Location: Waterloo, Ontario, Canada
- Colours: Blue
- Website: uwaterloo.ca/science/

The University of Waterloo Faculty of Science is one of six faculties at the University of Waterloo in Ontario, Canada.

== History ==
In the fall of 1959, the first students were enrolled in the Faculty of Science. As of 2024, there are 6,295 full-time undergraduates and 626 full-time graduate students.

In 2004/05, Science attracted almost $42.5 million in research funding in areas such as aquatic ecology, microbiology, solid state chemistry, environmental biology and groundwater contamination clean-up. In 2013/14 brought in $65 million in research funds, accounting for 38% of the university's total research income.

In October 2002, the Institute for Quantum Computing was established, with the assistance of Mike Lazaridis, as well the Perimeter Institute for Theoretical Physics.

The current dean of the faculty is Dr. Chris Houser, who began his appointment July 1, 2023. He is the 10th Dean of Science at the University of Waterloo.

== Departments ==
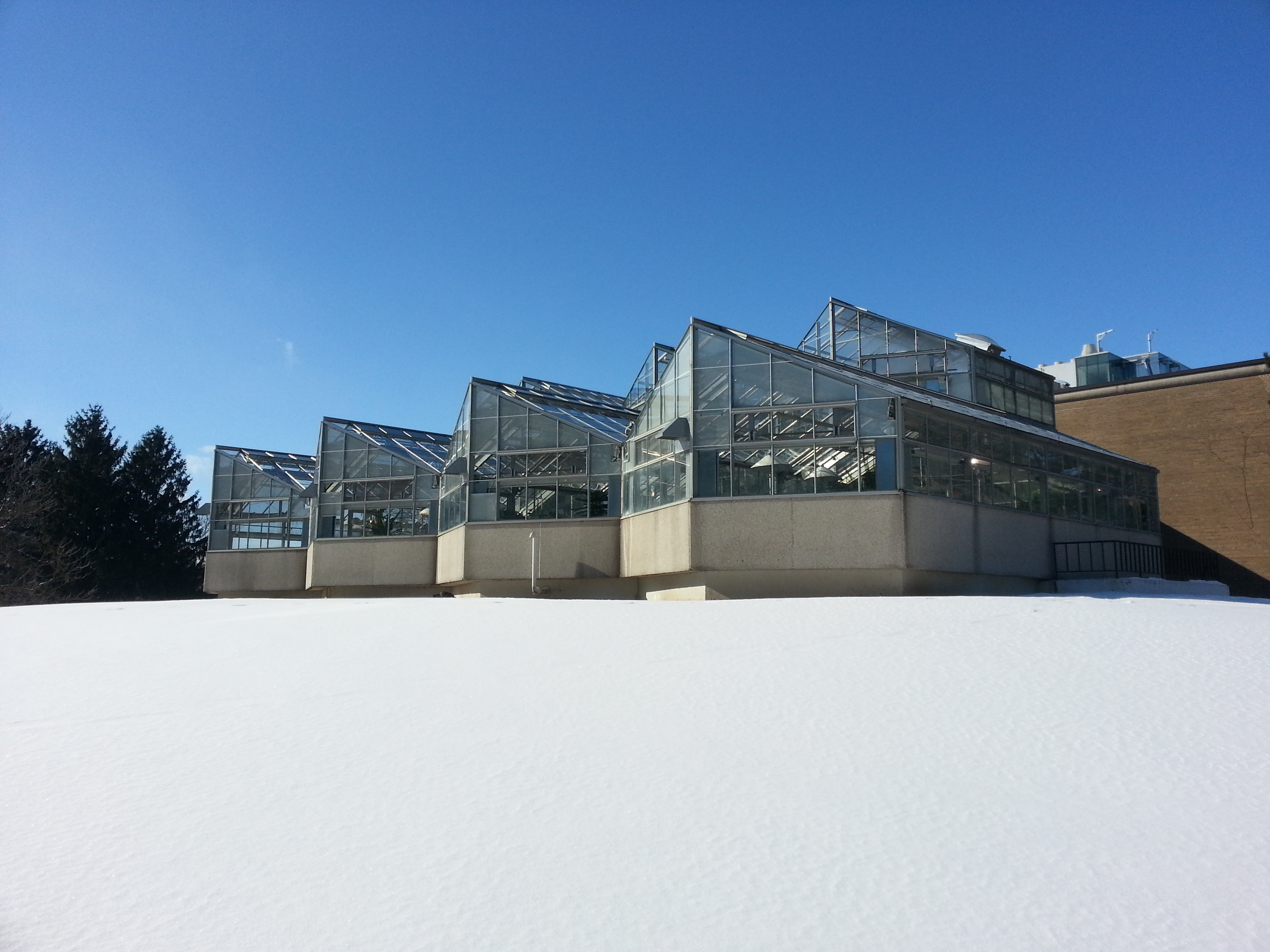
Biology greenhouse at the UW Campus

There are currently four departments in the Faculty of Science. They are the Departments of Biology, Chemistry, Earth & Environmental Sciences, and Physics & Astronomy. The Faculty of Science also runs the School of Optometry, and the School of Pharmacy. The School of Optometry is Canada's only English-language School of Optometry, renowned for its outreach programs and vision research. The Internationally renowned Perimeter Institute for Theoretical Physics is associated with the Department of Physics, and the Institute for Quantum Computing is also run through the Faculty of Science.

== Student life ==
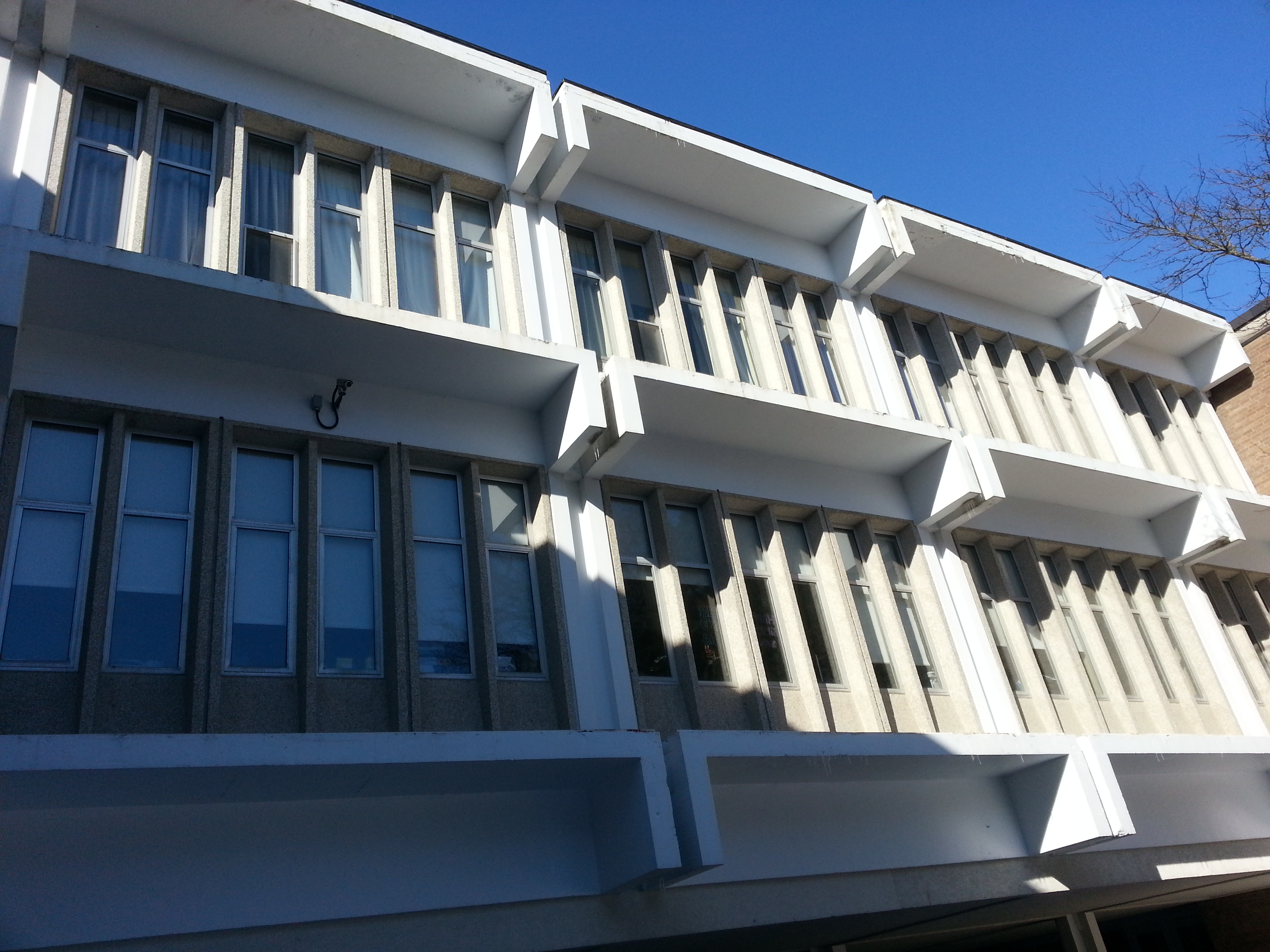
"The Link"

Students in the Faculty of Science are represented by the Science Society (SciSoc) which hosts social events, represents student interests to the university, and operates the Science C&D student coffee shop in the Biology 1 building. It used to be housed on the 3rd floor of The Link, between the Biology 1 and Earth Sciences & Chemistry (ESC) buildings, and consisted of an office holding a practice exam bank, and a lounge which had been a gathering place for students.

Answerable to SciSoc are the departmental clubs, which host social events and newsletters for students in a particular program. These clubs include the Biology UndergraduateSociety (BUGS), Biomedical Sciences Student Association (BMSA), Biochemistry Students' Association (BSA), Chemistry Club (Chemclub), Materials and Nanoscience Society (MNS), Physics Society (Physclub), Science and Business Students' Association (SBSA), and the Earth and Environmental Science Club (Watrox). Due to the wide range of departments in the faculty, the clubs are based out of the many different buildings that are part of the Faculty of Science.

Additionally, all students pay into the Waterloo Science Endowment Fund (WatSEF) which provides funding for updating lab equipment and ensuring students have access to latest technologies.

The mascot for the faculty of Science was Arriba the Amoeba. In 2023, it changed to a friendly, intelligent dinosaur name Cobalt.
