= Optometry and Vision Science =

Journal of the American Academy of Optometry

- Discipline: Optometry, vision science
- Language: English
- Edited by: David Elliott

Publication details
- Former names: American Journal of Optometry and Physiological Optics; American Journal of Optometry and Archives of the American Academy of Optometry; American Journal of Optometry
- History: 1924–present
- Publisher: Lippincott Williams & Wilkins
- Frequency: Monthly
- Impact factor: 2.4 (2025)

Standard abbreviations
- ISO 4: Optom. Vis. Sci.

Indexing
- CODEN: OVSCET
- ISSN: 1040-5488 (print); 1538-9235 (web)

Links
- Journal homepage; Online access; Online archive

Optometry and Vision Science is a monthly peer-reviewed medical journal published by Lippincott Williams & Wilkins on behalf of the American Academy of Optometry. The journal was established in 1924 as the American Journal of Optometry. It was renamed the American Journal of Optometry and Archives of the American Academy of Optometry in 1941, then to the American Journal of Optometry and Physiological Optics in 1974, before obtaining its current title in 1989. The editor-in-chief is David Elliott, PhD, FCOptom, FAAO.

== Abstracting and indexing ==
The journal is abstracted and indexed in Index Medicus/MEDLINE/PubMed, the Science Citation Index, and Current Contents/Clinical Medicine. According to the Journal Citation Reports, the journal has a 2025 impact factor of 2.4.

== Garland W. Clay Award ==
This award is given to the authors of the article published by the journal that has been most widely cited in the world of scientific literature in the preceding five years. Winners have included:

- Nathan Efron - 1980
- Jan E. Lovie-Kitchin - 1998
- Konrad Pesudovs - 2009 & 2011
- Max Snodderly
