= List of contact lens complications =

This is a list of complications that may result from the use of contact lenses.

== Eyelid ==
- Ptosis

== Conjunctiva ==
- Giant papillary conjunctivitis
- Superior limbic keratoconjunctivitis

== Cornea ==
- Epithelium
  - Corneal abrasion
  - Corneal erosion
  - Contact lens acute red eye (CLARE)
  - Corneal epithelial infiltrates
  - Keratitis
  - Corneal ulcer
- Corneal stroma
  - Corneal neovascularisation
  - Corneal oedema
  - Corneal infiltrates
- Corneal endothelium
  - Endothelial polymegathism

== See also ==
- Effects of long-term contact lens wear on the cornea
