= Raymond A. Applegate =

American optometrist

Raymond A. Applegate (born 1949) is an American optometrist and a co-founder of International Congress on Wavefront Sensing and Aberration-Free Refraction Correction. He is the Borish Chair in Optometry at the University of Houston.

Applegate earned an undergraduate degree, a Doctor of Optometry (OD), and a master's degree in physiological optics from Indiana University Bloomington. After entering private practice as an optometrist, Applegate returned to school for a PhD in physiological optics from the University of California, Berkeley. Early in his career, he served as an assistant professor at the University of Missouri–St. Louis.

In 1988 he became a faculty member at the University of Texas Health Science Center at San Antonio and by 1993 became a tenured professor there. In 2002, he became the Borish Chair in Optometry at the University of Houston. He was an editor of the Journal of the Optical Society of America and currently serves on an editorial board for such journals as the Journal of Optometry and Visual Science, the Journal of Refractive Surgery, and the Journal of Cataract and Refractive Surgery.
