= Nathan Efron =

Australian optometrist

Professor Nathan Efron AC
- Born: 3 September 1954 (age 72); Melbourne, Victoria, Australia
- Education: University of Melbourne; University of Manchester
- Scientific career
- Fields: Optometry
- Workplaces: University of Melbourne; University of Manchester; Queensland University of Technology
- Website: staff.qut.edu.au/staff/efron/

Nathan Efron AC (born 3 September 1954) is an Australian and British optometrist and an author of numerous research papers and nine books.

== Biography ==
Efron received undergraduate and Ph.D. degrees at the University of Melbourne in 1981 and the same year became a President of the Contact Lens Society of Australia. He left for postdoctoral studies at the University of California, Berkeley and the University of New South Wales. He returned to Melbourne as a lecturer then senior lecturer before becoming the chair of clinical optometry at the University of Manchester in 1990. He became a founding chairman of the clinical optometry at the University of Manchester, England where he also founded a contact lens research unit known as Eurolens Research.

Efron has served as president of the Australian College of Optometry since 2012. A recipient of a Doctor of Science from Manchester, Efron is also a past president of the British Contact Lens Association. In 2001 he was awarded a gold medal by the same association and began to serve as a dean at the University of Manchester from that year till 2004. In 2003 he received the Max Schapero Award and by 2006 he returned to his homeland as a research professor. He joined Institute of Health and Biomedical Innovation, School of Optometry at Queensland University of Technology the same year and currently has grants from the National Health and Medical Research Council, the Juvenile Diabetes Research Foundation International and the George Weaber Foundation Trust. in 2015, he was honoured in the Queens Birthdays honours list.
