= Stephen Lynch (professor) =

Australian liver transplant surgeon

Stephen Vincent Lynch AC is a liver transplant specialist who has worked on surgery to transplant liver tissue from adult donors to children. Lynch is the chairman of the division of surgery at Princess Alexandra Hospital in Brisbane.

Prof Stephen Lynch completed his undergraduate training at St Vincent's Hospital in Sydney. From there went on to complete fellowship training in Pittsburgh PA, USA.

He runs a private Hepatobiliary and Pancreatic Surgery practice at the Mater Medical Centre and is a Professor of Surgery at the University of Queensland. He is also the current chairman of both the Liver Transplant Unit and Surgical Services at the Princess Alexandra Hospital and Surgical Services Metro South.

Professor Lynch worked as a Member of Council, Asian Society of Transplantation, 2001–2012 and President of the Transplantation Society of Australia and New Zealand between 2001 and 2003. Lynch established the Australian and New Zealand Liver Transplantation Registry.
