= Karen Simmer =

Australian paediatrician and professor

Professor Karen Simmer AO FAHMS

Personal details
- Occupation: Paediatrician

Karen Simmer AO is an Australian paediatrician and professor of Newborn Medicine at the University of Western Australia and is director of two neonatal intensive care units at hospitals in Perth. She also runs the WA Human Milk Bank and is team leader, neonatal gut health, nutrition and development at the Telethon Kids Institute.

Simmer completed her secondary education at Abbotsleigh in Sydney and undertook an MB BS at the University of Sydney. She graduated from the University of London with a PhD in perinatal nutrition and later completed the Advanced Management Program at Harvard University.

== Honours ==
Simmer was appointed an Officer of the Order of Australia in the 2015 Queen's Birthday Honours for "distinguished service to medicine in the field of paediatrics, particularly neonatal and perinatal nutrition, to medical education as an academic, researcher and clinician, and to the community". She was elected Fellow of the Australian Academy of Health and Medical Sciences in 2017.

== Selected publications ==
- Makrides, M; Neumann, MA; Byard, RW; Simmer, K; Gibson, RA (1994). "Fatty acid composition of brain, retina, and erythrocytes in breast- and formula-fed infants". Am J Clin Nutr. 60 (2): 189–94. doi:10.1093/ajcn/60.2.189. PMID 7913291..
- Makrides, M; Neumann, M; Simmer, K; Pater, J; Gibson, R (1995). "Are long-chain polyunsaturated fatty acids essential nutrients in infancy?". Lancet. 345 (8963): 1463–8. doi:10.1016/s0140-6736(95)91035-2. PMID 7769900..
- Moon, K; Rao, SC; Schulzke, SM; Patole, SK; Simmer, K (2016). "Longchain polyunsaturated fatty acid supplementation in preterm infants". Cochrane Database Syst Rev. 12 (2) CD000375. doi:10.1002/14651858.CD000375.pub5. PMC 6463838. PMID 27995607.
- Jasani, B; Simmer, K; Patole, SK; Rao, SC (2017). "Long chain polyunsaturated fatty acid supplementation in infants born at term". Cochrane Database Syst Rev. 3 CD000376. doi:10.1002/14651858.CD000376.pub4. PMC 6464574. PMID 28281303.
- Hartmann, BT; Pang, WW; Keil, AD; Hartmann, PE; Simmer, K (2007). "Best practice guidelines for the operation of a donor human milk bank in an Australian NICU". Early Hum Dev. 83 (10): 667–73. doi:10.1016/j.earlhumdev.2007.07.012. PMID 17913402..
