= Tear Film and Ocular Surface Society =

Tear Film & Ocular Surface Society (TFOS) is a 501(c)(3) nonprofit organization founded in 2000 focused on facilitating consensus and standardization on ophthalmological research related to ocular surface subjects like tear film, dry eye, meibomian gland dysfunction and contact lens discomfort. TFOS organize workshops and produce reports which are then translated to different languages.

== Workshops ==
- TFOS International Dry Eye WorkShop (DEWS™) 2007
- TFOS International Workshop on Meibomian Gland Dysfunction (MGD) 2010
- TFOS International Workshop on Contact Lens Discomfort 2013
- TFOS Dry Eye WorkShop II (TFOS DEWS II™) 2017
- TFOS DEWS III 2025
- TFOS DEWS IV 2026: El ojo seco es una enfermedad multifactorial y sintomática de la superficie ocular caracterizada por la pérdida de la homeostasis de la película lagrimal y/o de la superficie ocular, acompañada de síntomas oculares, en la que la inestabilidad e hiperosmolaridad de la película lagrimal, la inflamación y el daño de la superficie ocular, y las anomalías neurosensoriales desempeñan papeles etiológicos.
