= Clinical and Experimental Optometry =

- Discipline: Optometry
- Language: English
- Edited by: Nathan Efron

Publication details
- Former names: Optical News; The Commonwealth Optometrist; Australasian Journal of Optometry; Australian Journal of Optometry
- History: 1911–present
- Publisher: Taylor & Francis
- Frequency: Bimonthly
- Impact factor: 2.742 (2020)

Standard abbreviations
- ISO 4: Clin. Exp. Optom.

Indexing
- ISSN: 0816-4622 (print); 1444-0938 (web)
- OCLC no.: 1057930953

Links
- Journal homepage; Online access; Online archive

Clinical and Experimental Optometry is a bimonthly peer-reviewed medical journal covering optometry. As of 2021, the journal has been published by Taylor & Francis on behalf of Optometry Australia, the New Zealand Association of Optometrists, the Hong Kong Society of Professional Optometrists, and the Singapore Optometric Association, of which it is the official journal. Previously it was published by John Wiley & Sons. The editor-in-chief is Professor Nathan Efron.

The 2020 Journal Citation Reports (Clarivate Analytics) ranks the journal 30/62 in the ophthalmology specialty.

== History ==
The journal was established in 1911 as Optical News, a medical and news publication of the New South Wales Institute of Ophthalmic Opticians. The journal was renamed to The Commonwealth Optometrist in 1918 after the founding of the Australian Optometrical Association in the same year. The journal was renamed to the Australasian Journal of Optometry in 1929, to the Australian Journal of Optometry in 1959, and to its current title in 1986. It became an exclusively scholarly journal when it stopped publishing news articles in 1979.
