= British Contact Lens Association =

The British Contact Lens Association is an educational and scientific membership organisation formed in 1977.

In 2013 it had 2000 members. It organises an annual clinical conference and exhibition. In 2015 the main themes were myopia management and presbyopia correction. It organised a research symposium in March 2016 with the Netherlands Contact Lens Congress.

== Global Ambassadors ==
The BCLA selects Global Ambassadors, who must be Fellows of the BCLA, and "work towards helping us reach a wider global audience by sharing BCLA news and updates with professional networks across the regions. Each of them play a key role in bringing research, skills and knowledge development to like-minded professionals with an interest in contact lens and anterior eye care." As of 2024, the Global Ambassadors are:

- Melissa Barnett (The Americas)
- David Berkow (Middle East/Africa)
- Nicole Carnt (Australasia)
- Karen Carrasquillo (The Americas)
- Jennifer Craig (Australasia)
- Daddi Fadel (Europe)
- Amod Gogate (Asia)
- Kurt Moody (The Americas)
- Pauline Cho (Asia)
- Fernando J Fernandez-Velazquez (Europe)
- Joserine Samson (Middle East/Africa)
- Jacinto Santodomingo-Rubido (Europe)
- Bridgitte Shen Lee (The Americas)
- Fabrizio Zeri (Europe)
