= American Academy of Optometry =

The American Academy of Optometry (AAO) is an organization of optometrists based in Orlando, Florida. Its goal is to maintain and enhance excellence in optometric practice, by both promoting research and the dissemination of knowledge.

The AAO holds an annual meeting, publishes a monthly scientific journal, gives credentials to optometrists through the fellowship process and publishes position statements.

The Academy is composed of optometrists, vision scientists, and other qualified professionals who have successfully met the standards required for the designation FAAO. In qualifying for Fellowship of AAO (FAAO), individuals are evaluated according to the highest standards of competence.

== See also ==
- Optometry and Vision Science: the AAO's journal
- American Optometric Association
- College of Optometrists in Vision Development
