= Australian College of Optometry =

Not-for-profit organisation in Australia for improving eye health

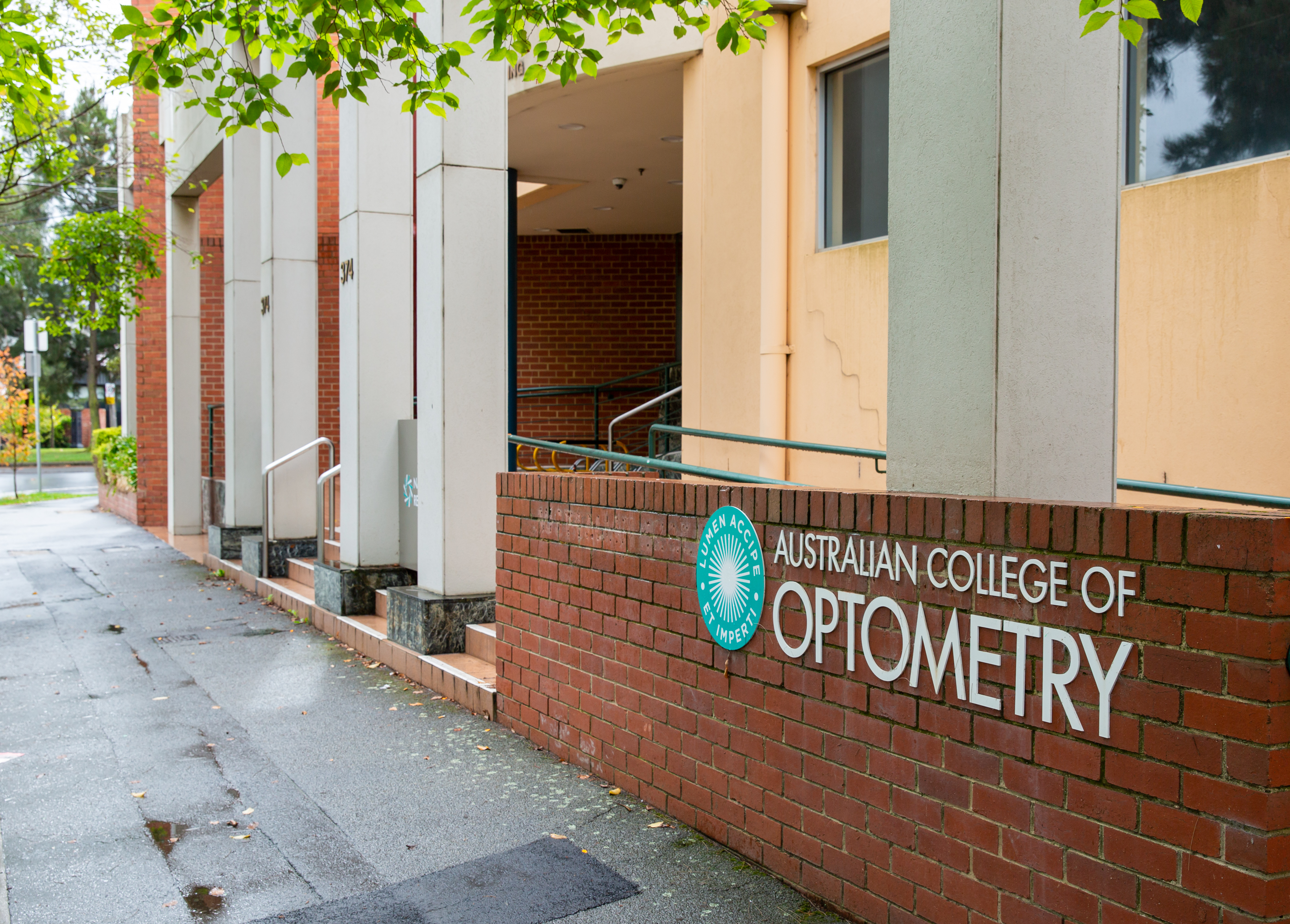
- ACO's Carlton site building
- Type: Optometry services, research, education
- Established: 1940
- CEO: Pete Haydon
- Location: Carlton, Victoria, Australia
- Website: aco.org.au

The Australian College of Optometry (ACO) is an Australian non-profit working to improve the eye health and well-being of various Australian communities. Established in 1940, the ACO's goal is to deliver public health optometry, vision research and professional education.

== Mission ==
ACO's mission is to improve the eye health and wellbeing of communities through providing practical clinical optometry services, undertaking research and providing education for optometrists.

== Governance and management ==
The ACO is governed by a council, that acts as the governing body to set the strategic direction of the organization. ACO councillors are elected by current ACO members to serve for a period of two years, alongside several skills-based appointments.

The organisation is as of October 2021 led by CEO Pete Haydon.

== Clinical services ==
The ACO delivers clinical care to communities across Victoria and South Australia by providing routine and advanced eye care services. The clinical team also works in collaboration with hospitals and community clinics.

As of 2021 ACO's largest clinic is based in Carlton, Victoria. This clinic has more than 25 consulting rooms and is equipped with advanced equipment. A mobile outreach eye care program complements a network of nine clinics across the two states. Services offered at the ACO include paediatric, contact lens, low vision and disability, ocular diseases, outreach and Aboriginal services, and visual functions.

Providing eye care to disadvantaged communities is a central part of the ACO's work. Since 1985, the ACO has managed and administered the Victorian Eyecare Service (VES), which was established and funded by the Victorian Government to deliver an integrated, coordinated public health eye care program. People are eligible for VES benefits if they are permanent residents of Victoria and either hold a concession card, are children in foster care, or identify as an Aboriginal and/or Torres Strait Islander person.

ACO's Outreach services began in 1998 for patients with disabilities, and has since expanded to provide clinical services for the aged, Indigenous communities, refugees and asylum seekers, children from disadvantaged schools, people experiencing homelessness and other high-risk groups.

The ACO continues to work towards closing the gap for vision in Aboriginal and Torres Strait Islander people. It has provided comprehensive eye care services at the Victorian Aboriginal Health Service in Fitzroy in Melbourne for over 20 years. It also works in partnership with several Aboriginal community-controlled health organisations across Victoria, as well as in the border regions of NSW and SA, to provide eye care services through the Visiting Optometry Scheme. Funded by the Rural Workforce Agency Victoria, this scheme facilitates accessibility to eye care for Aboriginal and Torres Strait Islander communities living in remote locations.

The ACO is involved in the Provision of Eye Health Equipment and Training Project, an Australian Government Department of Health-funded initiative. It works as part of a consortium to roll out retinal cameras and slit lamps, as well as training primary health clinics across Australia to improve eye health outcomes of First Nations people. The consortium members include Brien Holden Foundation, Aboriginal Health Council of South Australia, Centre for Eye Health and Optometry Australia.

== National Vision Research Institute of Australia ==
The National Vision Research Institute (NVRI) is the research arm of the ACO, which undertakes internationally-recognised research to help understand the complexities of vision and its disorders. Its principal goal is to conduct research that work towards preservation of sight and the prevention of blindness. Professor Michael Ibbotson has been leading the research team as the Director of the NVRI and Professor at the University of Melbourne since 2011.

Established in 1972, with bequests from the optometry community and generous donations from the Schultz Laubman Schultz Endowment Fund Trust, the NVRI is committed to understanding vision disorders and explaining how the brain processes vision. It conducts basic science, clinical and translational research while also supervising PhD students in partnership with universities.

NVRI's research priorities including neurotechnology, with a strong focus on the development of prosthetic vision devices (or bionic eyes) in partnership with Bionic Vision Australian (BVA) to restore vision in people with retinitis pigmentosa and age-related macular degeneration, clinical optometry and public health, to improve the understanding of vision science, vision care and treatment.

In 1976, NVRI garnered international recognition when researchers Ian Bailey and Jan Lovie developed the Bailey-Lovie LogMAR visual acuity charts (Logarithm of the Minimum Angle of Resolution). The chart is widely in use by ophthalmologists, orthoptists, optometrists, and vision scientists world over to estimate visual acuity.

Over the years NVRI has acquired a high profile for publishing output in top ranking scientific and medical journals and presenting at international conferences. This has been crucial in attracting several grants from the National Health and Medical Research Council (NHMRC), the Australian Research Council (ARC), including BVA, and other philanthropic grants. In 2014, the NVRI was announced as a node of the ARC Centre of Excellence for Integrative Brain Function, placing it in a research network among Australia's top six research universities.

== Education ==
Since its inception, the ACO has continued to build on its commitment to education. The organisation is a pioneer in continuing professional development opportunities for practicing optometrists as well as helping train and build a foundation for the next generation of optometrists.

Developed by experts in their fields, the ACO provides unique, innovative, and specialised education across a broad range of clinical areas. Advanced education programs have been developed to support optometrists to upskill to provide the best patient care. This is delivered through certificate courses, webinars, clinical workshops, conferences to meet the current and future needs of the wider optometry profession. The ACO has a long history in training optometry students across Australia. The clinical teaching program provides regular placements to students from Deakin University, the University of Melbourne, UNSW Sydney and Flinders University.
