= Terry Stepien =

Canadian computer scientist

- Born: 1958 (age 67–68)
- Occupation: computer scientist
- Known for: won two technical Oscar awards

Terry Stepien is a Canadian computer scientist, and protege of Wes Graham, an influential professor of Computer Science at Stepien's alma mater, the University of Waterloo. Stepien earned a Bachelor of Mathematics in 1981, and his Masters in 1988.

Stepien worked under Graham at the University's Computer Systems Group (CSG), the department that had developed the very successful Watfor, Watbol and Watiac. In 1981 senior members of CSG incorporated Watcom, the University's first software spin-off company. At Watcom Stepien was responsible for the development of its Structured Query Language (SQL) Anywhere software product. When Sybase acquired Watcom, Stepien continued to lead this effort. In 2000 Sybase had Stepien lead the spin-off of iAnywhere Solutions an "entrepreneurial subsidiary".

In 2001 he became the 7th awardee of the J.W. Graham Medal, named in honor of Graham, and annually awarded to an influential alumnus of the University's Faculty of Mathematics.

In 2004, under Stepien's direction, Sybase became the first tenant in a long-awaited technology park built on the University of Waterloo's large and undeveloped north campus.

When SAP SE acquired Sybase in 2010, Stepien became senior vice-president of emerging technologies at SAP Labs Canada.
