= J. W. Graham Medal =

Canadian technology award

The J.W. Graham Medal in Computing and Innovation is an award given annually by the University of Waterloo and the University of Waterloo Faculty of Mathematics to "recognize the leadership and many innovative contributions made to the University of Waterloo, and to the Canadian computer industry." Recipients of this award receive a gold medal and certificate. Recipients are graduates of the University of Waterloo Faculty of Mathematics from business, education, or government.

The medal was established in 1994 to recognize Canadian computer industry veteran James Wesley Graham (known as "Wes Graham"). Graham was born in Copper Cliff, Ontario on January 17, 1932. He enrolled in the University of Toronto in 1950, and graduated with a BA in Mathematics and Physics in 1954, and an MA in Mathematics in 1955. He worked as a systems engineer for IBM in Canada, and then joined the faculty of the University of Waterloo in 1959. A team of his students developed the WATFOR series of compilers starting in 1965. He formed a computer science research group, known as the "Computer Systems Group," to distribute and maintain the software, and was also responsible for several spin-off organizations, including Watcom in 1981. He was made a member of the Order of Canada in April 1999. He died later that year on August 23, 1999. In 2001 his papers formed the start of the J. Wesley Graham History of Computer Science Research Collection at the University of Waterloo library.

== Recipients ==
The following people have received the J. W. Graham Medal:

- 1995 - Ian McPhee
- 1996 - William Reeves
- 1997 - James G. Mitchell
- 1998 - Dan Dodge
- 1999 - Kim Davidson
- 2000 - Paul Van Oorschot
- 2001 - Terry Stepien
- 2002 - Peter Savich
- 2003 - F. David Boswell
- 2004 - David P. Yach
- 2005 - Garth A. Gibson
- 2006 - Deanne Farrar
- 2007 - Ricardo Baeza-Yates
- 2008 - Eric Veach
- 2009 - Craig Eisler
- 2010 - Steven Woods
- 2011 - Zack Urlocker
- 2012 - Stephen M. Watt
- 2013 - Jay Steele
- 2014 - Jeromy Carriere
- 2015 - Tom Duff
- 2016 - Tas Tsonis
- 2017 - Vicki Iverson
- 2018 - Alex Nicolaou
- 2019 - Eldon Sprickerhoff
- 2020 - Joanne McKinley
- 2021 - Don Cowan
- 2024 - Beryl Tomay and Brice Steven Nkengsa

== See also ==
- List of computer science awards
- Prizes named after people
