= F. David Boswell =

Canadian computer scientist (born 1956)

- Born: 1956 (age 69–70)
- Education: University of Waterloo (Masters in Computer Science)
- Occupations: Computer Scientist, software executive
- Known for: Awarded the J.W. Graham Medal in 2003

Franklin David Boswell (born c. 1956) is a Canadian computer scientist who was awarded the J.W. Graham Medal for his contributions to the field in 2003.

== Biography ==
Boswell earned his undergraduate and Masters in Computer Science at the University of Waterloo in Ontario, Canada. While he was a student and after he earned his masters in 1980, Boswell worked under J. Wesley Graham, a senior Computer Scientist at the University of Waterloo, who had broadly managed teams at Waterloo that developed several widely used computer language compilers.

One of the first languages that was his design was the ″Waterloo Systems Language″, intended for systems programming, which introduced some new flow control constructs.

Boswell worked in compiler design at the University of Waterloo's Computer Systems Group until 1988, when he was one of the founders of Watcom. Watcom's other products were written in the Waterloo Systems Language. Watcom developed Watcom C and several other successful products until it was acquired by Powersoft in 1994 for $100 million. Powersoft was in turn acquired by Sybase and Boswell was made a Sybase vice-president.

In 1998 Boswell left Sybase and was one of the founders of LivePage, in Waterloo. In 1999 Boswell was the President of LivePage when it merged or was acquired by Janna Systems, for $19 million.
