= David R. Cheriton School of Computer Science =

Professional school at the University of Waterloo

- Former names: Department of Applied Analysis and Computer Science (1967–1975); Department of Computer Science (1975–2002); School of Computer Science (2002–2005)
- Type: Professional school
- Parent institution: University of Waterloo Faculty of Mathematics
- Director: Raouf Boutaba
- Academic staff: 90
- Administrative staff: 50
- Undergraduates: 3600
- Postgraduates: 400
- Location: Waterloo, Ontario, Canada
- Website: cs.uwaterloo.ca

The David R. Cheriton School of Computer Science is a professional school within the Faculty of Mathematics at the University of Waterloo.

== History ==
In 1965, when Mathematics was still a department within the Faculty of Arts, four third-year mathematics students (Richard Shirley, Angus German, James G. Mitchell, and Bob Zarnke) wrote the WATFOR compiler for the FORTRAN programming language, under the direction of lecturer Peter Shantz. "Within a year it would be adopted by computing centres in over eight countries, and the number of student users at UW increased to over 2500." Later on in 1966, two mathematics lecturers (Paul Dirksen and Paul H. Cress) led a team that developed WATFOR 360, for which they received the 1972 Grace Murray Hopper Award from the Association for Computing Machinery.

UW's Faculty of Mathematics was later established in 1967. As a result, the Department of Applied Analysis and Computer Science (AA&CS) was created. By 1969, AA&CS had become the largest department in the faculty. At that point, the first two PhD degrees in computer science were awarded, to Byron L. Ehle, for a thesis on numerical analysis, and to Hugh Williams, for a thesis on computational number theory. In 1975 the department dropped the words "Applied Analysis" and became simply the Department of Computer Science.

In 1982, the Institute for Computer Research (ICR) was established. Its goals were "to foster computer research..., facilitate interaction with industry, and encourage advanced education in computer science and engineering." Also that year, the Ontario government announced plans to build the Davis Centre, current home of the School of Computer Science. The groundbreaking was in April 1985 and the Davis Centre was formally dedicated on November 10, 1988.

On May 1, 2002, the department officially became the School of Computer Science. On November 18, 2005, it was renamed again to the David R. Cheriton School of Computer Science, in recognition of the establishment of the David R. Cheriton Endowment for Excellence in Computer Science. Cheriton had recently donated $25 million to the university.

Support for computing within the School of Computer Science had been historically provided by the Computer Science Computing Facility (CSCF) and ICR.

== Programs ==
The David R. Cheriton School of Computer Science offers several diverse undergraduate programs including:

- Bachelor of Computer Science
  - Honours Computer Science
    - Business Option
    - Bioinformatics Option
    - Digital Hardware Option
    - Software Engineering Option
  - Honours Data Science
- Bachelor of Mathematics
  - Honours Computer Science
    - Business Option
    - Digital Hardware Option
- Bachelor of Software Engineering
- Bachelor of Computing and Financial Management

In general, the philosophy of the undergraduate program is to build a solid foundation of mathematics and computer science during the first three years of the program, allowing students more flexibility in fourth year. Required courses for all computer science programs include courses in combinatorics, data structures, algorithms, compilers, software engineering and operating systems. The curriculum is also designed to encourage either significant depth in an area outside of computer science (such as in the Bioinformatics Option) or exposure to a variety of areas outside of the computer science.

The school also offers Masters of Mathematics and Ph.D. graduate programs.

- Master of Mathematics (Computer Science)
- Ph.D. in Computer Science

== Reputation ==
QS World University Rankings ranked the David R. Cheriton School of Computer Science 21st in the world, 10th in North America and 2nd in Canada in Computer Science in 2024. U.S. News & World Report ranked the David R. Cheriton School of Computer Science 42nd in world and second in Canada.

The university is well-regarded in the field of Computer Science, where it ranks 41st in the world and fourth in Canada according to the Times Higher Education World University Rankings, and 22nd in the world and second in Canada in the QS World University Rankings in 2019.
