= Mark Giesbrecht =

Canadian computer scientist

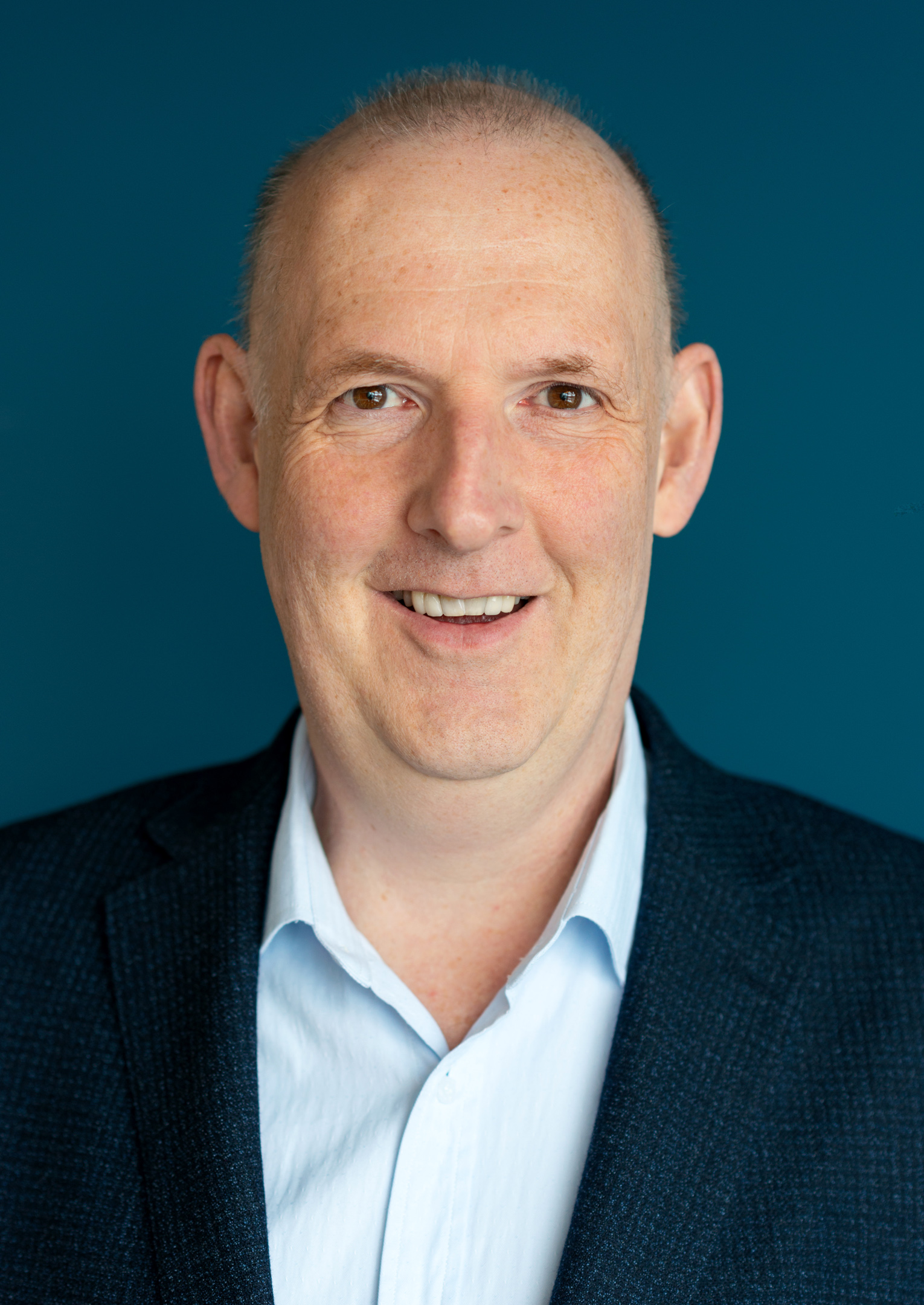
- Mark Giesbrecht in the Davis Centre, University of Waterloo
- Education: University of Toronto (1993, PhD, computer science) University of Toronto (1988, MSc, computer science) University of British Columbia (1986, BSc, computer science)
- Occupations: Computer Science Professor, University of Waterloo Faculty of Mathematics

Mark Giesbrecht is a Canadian computer scientist who served as the 12th dean of the University of Waterloo’s Faculty of Mathematics from July 1, 2020, to June 30, 2025. Previously, he was the Director of the David R. Cheriton School of Computer Science at the University of Waterloo, Canada from July 2014 until June 2020.

== Biography ==
Giesbrecht earned a PhD in computer science at the University of Toronto in 1993, under the supervision of Joachim von zur Gathen. He has been a professor at the University of Waterloo since 2001, following positions at the University of Manitoba (1994–98) and University of Western Ontario (1998–2001), as well as IBM Canada Ltd. (1991–93). He was the Director of the David R. Cheriton School of Computer Science at Waterloo from July 2014 until June 2020. On July 1, 2020, he became the Dean of the Faculty of Mathematics at the University of Waterloo, a position he held until June 30, 2025.

== Research ==
Giesbrecht's research is in computer algebra, where he has proved a number of fundamental results, including on the complexity of computing matrix normal forms, solving sparse diophantine linear systems, and non-commutative polynomial algebra. More recently he has been on the forefront of an optimization approach to symbolic-numeric algorithms for matrix polynomials.

== Awards ==
As a member of the Cheriton School of Computer Science's Symbolic Computation Group, Giesbrecht shared the 2004 NSERC Synergy prize for innovation under the prize's small- and medium-sized companies category. In 2012 he was named an ACM Distinguished Member.
