= David Boswell (disambiguation) =

David Boswell (born 1953) is a Canadian comic book writer and artist.

David or Dave Boswell may also refer to:

- Dave Boswell (baseball) (1945–2012), American right-handed pitcher
- F. David Boswell (born c.1956), Canadian computer scientist, awarded the J.W. Graham Medal in 2003
- David Boswell (Kentucky politician) (born 1949), former Democratic member of the Kentucky Senate
- David Boswell, British musician in Hiem
