= Dan Dodge =

Canadian businessman

Dan Dodge is a cocreator of the QNX microkernel real-time operating system, with Gordon Bell. They began the project while students at the University of Waterloo in 1980. Dodge then moved to Kanata, Ontario, a high-tech area inside Ottawa, to start Quantum Software Systems. It was later renamed QNX Software Systems to avoid confusion with a hard drive manufacturer. The first commercial version of QNX was released for the Intel 8088 central processing unit (CPU) in 1982.

In 1998, Dodge became the fourth awardee of the J. W. Graham Medal, named in honor of Wes Graham an early influential professor of computer science at the University of Waterloo, and annually awarded to an influential alumnus of the University's faculty of mathematics.

In 2002, Dodge and Bell were acclaimed as Heroes of Manufacturing by Fortune magazine.

Mr. Dodge holds a master's degree in mathematics and was the chief executive officer of QNX Software Systems, a division of BlackBerry Limited. In an earnings call on March 29, 2012, BlackBerry CEO Thorsten Heins stated "Dan Dodge is now [BlackBerry]'s lead software architect and is responsible for driving both the QNX business and the BlackBerry 10 platform vision."

Dan Dodge announced his retirement from QNX on 8 September 2015, effective at the end of the year. In late July 2016, it was reported that Dodge will join Apple at the company's new Kanata location, assisting with Apple's automotive team with Bob Mansfield.]

== See also ==
- List of University of Waterloo people
