= Ian McPhee =

Ian McPhee may refer to:

- Ian McPhee (footballer), Scottish footballer
- Ian Macphee, Australian politician
- Ian McPhee (computer scientist), co-founder of Watcom
