= Kim Davidson =

Canadian computer scientist and entrepreneur

- Born: 1955 (age 69–70)
- Occupation: computer scientist
- Known for: won two technical Oscar awards

Kim Davidson is a Canadian computer scientist, and founder and CEO of Side Effects software. He founded the firm in 1987.

In 1998 the Academy of Motion Pictures awarded Davidson a technical Oscar, the Academy Award for Technical Achievement. Davidson would later win a second Oscar.

In 1999, for a profile in Playback magazine Davidson, said he had been fascinated by the technical details of how animation worked since he was a child watching Saturday morning cartoons, like Magilla Gorilla. As a teenager Davidson had constructed his own small animation studio in his parents' home. Initially Davidson was planning to study animation at Sheridan College, but switched to the University of Waterloo's Architecture program—a field of study where he thought he could combine both his technical and artistic sides. However, after several years he added Computer Science, and graduated with a double major in both Architecture and Computer Science, in 1978.

In 1999 he became the fifth awardee of the J.W. Graham Medal, named in honor of Wes Graham an early influential Professor of Computer Science at the University of Waterloo, and annually awarded to an influential alumnus of the University's Faculty of Mathematics.
