= Raouf Boutaba =

Algerian-Canadian computer scientist

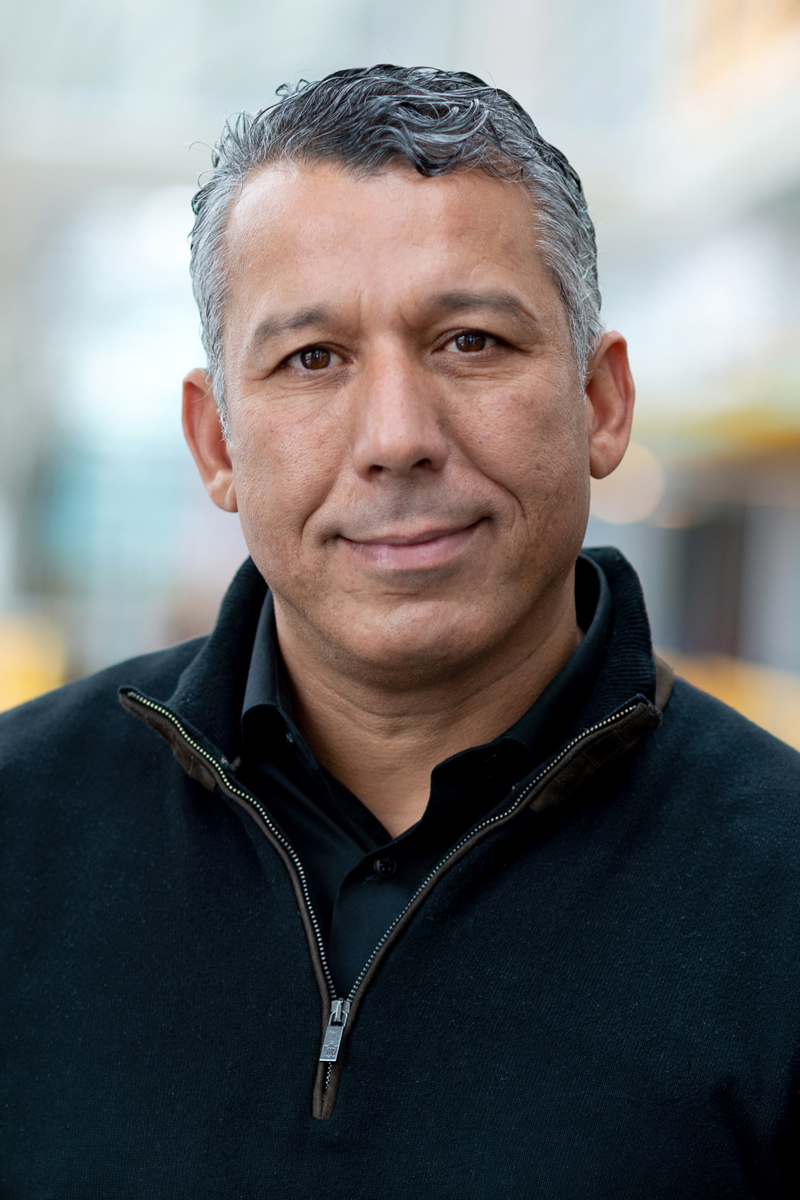
- Boutaba in 2019
- Born: December 31, 1966 (age 59)
- Citizenship: Canadian; Algerian
- Education: University of Annaba (BSc), Pierre and Marie Curie University (MSc, PhD)
- Known for: Automated network management, policy-based management, network virtualization, cloud computing, network softwarization, distributed pattern matching
- Scientific career
- Fields: Computer science
- Doctoral advisor: Guy Pujolle
- Website: rboutaba.cs.uwaterloo.ca

Raouf Boutaba (born December 31, 1966) is an Algerian Canadian computer scientist. His research interests are in resource, network and service management in wired and wireless networked systems. His work focuses on network virtualization, network softwarization, cloud computing, and network security.

He has been a full professor in the David R. Cheriton School of Computer Science since 2007. In 2016, he became the associate dean of research in the University of Waterloo’s Faculty of Mathematics, and in July 2019 was appointed its first associate dean of innovation and entrepreneurship. On July 1, 2020, he became the eighth director of the David R. Cheriton School of Computer Science. He holds a university research chair at the University of Waterloo, and an INRIA International Chair in France.

== Education and career ==
Boutaba was born in Tébessa, Algeria. After completing a BSc in computer engineering at the University of Annaba, Algeria in 1988, he completed an MSc in 1990 and a PhD in 1994 in computer science at Pierre and Marie Curie University, now part of Sorbonne University, in Paris, France.

In 1995, he joined the Centre de recherche en informatique de Montréal in Canada as the lead researcher, where he founded and lead the Telecommunications and Distributed Systems Research Division and later became its director. In 1999, he joined the University of Waterloo's David R. Cheriton School of Computer Science as an assistant professor. He was promoted to associate professor in 2002 and to full professor in 2007. In 2016, Boutaba became the associate dean of research in the Faculty of Mathematics and in July 2019 was appointed its first associate dean of innovation and entrepreneurship. He became a university research chair in 2018, a position typically held for seven years.

Boutaba held a Cheriton Faculty Fellowship at the University of Waterloo from 2007–2010 and again from 2012–2015. He also held a Faculty of Mathematics Fellowship from 2003–2005.

Boutaba held visiting professorships at the University of Toronto, Canada, the Pohang University of Science and Technology – POSTECH, Korea, the Universidade Federal do Rio de Janeiro, Brazil, the Université Pierre & Marie Curie – Paris VI, the Université de Versailles St-Quentin-en-Yvelines, Télécom ParisTech, Université Paris Nord – Paris XIII, Université Paris-Est-Marne-la-Vallée, Université Henry Descartes – Paris V, Lorraine Université d'Excellence, France.

Research contributions

Boutaba is known for his role in establishing automated network management, which directly led to the trend towards autonomic networking. His PhD thesis introduced fundamental concepts for automating network management tasks, including proactive and reactive management models, organizational management domains, goal-driven and policy-based management — the use of interpreted, easily modified policies to define rules for changes in networks’ behaviour facilitating network programmability and self-managing networks. Boutaba’s work on automated network management has been applied in various areas, including configuration, fault, and security management, and to various network technologies, including optical, wireless, and IP networks.

Boutaba is also known for his fundamental contributions to network virtualization, including virtual network resource allocation and management, user-controlled lightpaths, virtual network embedding, survivable virtual network embedding, multi-domain virtual network embedding, and data centre virtualization.

His research also includes major contributions to cloud resource management, software-defined networking, network function virtualization, resource management in wireless and mobile networks. His invention of distributed pattern matching — a generic framework for distributed search in large-scale environments — has applications in many areas, including Internet-scale service discovery, decentralized Web hosting, decentralized social networks, and information-centric networking.

Awards and honours

Boutaba was named a Fellow of the Institute of Electrical and Electronics Engineers in 2012 for contributions to network management methodologies and applications. He was named a Fellow of the Engineering Institute of Canada in 2013 for contributions to the management of communication networks and services, and Fellow of the Canadian Academy of Engineering in 2015 for pioneering contributions to automated and policy-based network management, which opened new exciting possibilities toward self-managing networks and autonomic computing, and groundbreaking work on network virtualization as a foundation for the future Internet architecture. In 2019, he was named a Fellow of the Royal Society of Canada, the country’s highest academic honour.

Boutaba received the 2009 Dan Stokesberry Award for particularly distinguished technical contribution to the growth of the network management field, the highest recognition for technical contributions in the area of network management. He was awarded the 2014 McNaughton Gold Medal, IEEE Canada's highest honour. In 2017, Boutaba was awarded an INRIA International Chair, a research position typically held for five years, and in 2018 a University Research Chair at the University of Waterloo, a position typically held of seven years.

Boutaba received several other national and international awards, including the following:

- 2016 IEEE Communications Society Technical Committee on Information Infrastructure and Networking technical achievement award for incredible contribution in the field of data communication infrastructure and network management
- 2016 IEEE Communications Society Donald W. McLellan Meritorious Service Award for dedicated and outstanding long-term service to the IEEE Communication Society and his high quality contributions to and his leadership in conferences, publications, standards and technical activities
- 2013 IBM Faculty Award for outstanding reputation and contributions in the field of service management automation
- 2012 Salah Aidarous Award for unremitting service and dedication to the IT and Telecommunications Network Operations and Management community
- 2011 Google Faculty Award for world-class research in cloud computing
- 2005–2009 IEEE Communications Society Distinguished Lecturer on Autonomic Computing and Communications
- 2009 IEEE Communications Society Joseph LoCicero Publications Award for outstanding service as founding Editor-in-Chief of the IEEE Transactions on Network & Service Management
- 2009 NSERC Discovery Accelerator Award awarded to 3% top researchers in science and engineering in Canada
- 2008 IEEE Communication Society 2008 Fred W. Ellersick Paper Prize
- 2007 IEEE Communications Society Harold Sobol Award for envisioning and implementing a converged strategy for the Society's network operations and management events that significantly increased their value to the industry and academic community in this field
- 2007 IFIP Silver Core for outstanding service to the International Federation for Information Processing as chair of the IFIP working group on network and distributed systems management
- 2005 Nortel Networks Award for Leadership Excellence in Technology Transfer
- 2002–2004 Distinguished speaker, IEEE Computer Society Distinguished Visitors Program
- 2004 Nortel Networks Research Excellence Award
- 2000 Premier’s Research Excellence Award
- 1998 Higher Education and Research Minister’s Prize for Best Graduating Computer Engineer
