= AOL TV =

Internet service

- Company type: Subsidiary of America Online
- Industry: Internet Protocol television
- Founded: June 2000; 25 years ago
- Defunct: 2002
- Fate: Discontinued
- Headquarters: New York, NY, United States
- Area served: nationwide in USA
- Key people: Anne Bentley (spokeswomen); David Nagel (board member); Tom Nagel (board member); James Barksdale (board member); Larry Ellison (board member); Mitchell Kertzman (early CEO and president); Philip Vachon (later CEO)
- Products: IPTV
- Parent: AOL
- Website: aoltv.com (Not active)

AOL TV was the name of both a thin client which uses a television for display (rather than a monitor), and the online service that supports it, both of which were launched in June 2000 to compete with WebTV.

The product and service were developed by America Online. While most thin clients developed in the mid-1990s were positioned as diskless workstations for corporate intranets, AOL TV was positioned as a consumer device for web access. Since the device was a dedicated web browser appliance, the cost of licensing a proprietary operating system could be avoided. The cost of licensing a proprietary operating system is substantial for inexpensive devices.

The set top box for AOL TV was developed by NCI/Liberate using a thin client and manufactured by Philips.

AOL TV discontinued sales in November 2002, although the service remained available to existing subscribers. The service is no longer supported by AOL and the documentation has been removed from their servers.
