= EDOS (software distribution system) =

EDOS (Electronic Distribution of Software) was a British point-of-sale software distribution system operated in the early 1990s by Software on Demand Ltd. It allowed computer retailers to produce licensed copies of software on demand by writing games held on local CD-ROM masters to cassette tape or floppy disk when they were purchased. The system was used by branches of John Menzies, Future Zone, and W. H. Smith, and by 1994 was installed in 138 locations and offered over 350 titles.

== Operation ==
Stores with an EDOS system were equipped with a dedicated computer containing a database of available software, hardware required to duplicate it onto the customer's chosen medium, and a modem to allow duplicates to be tracked for royalty purposes. Software masters were stored on encrypted CD-ROMs and could be written to several types of floppy disk or cassette tape. The system supported software for several formats including the Amiga, Atari ST, IBM PC compatibles, Amstrad CPC, Commodore 64, ZX Spectrum and MSX. More than 20 software companies supplied titles through EDOS, including Alternative Software, Codemasters, Titus, and Ocean Software.

EDOS was intended to allow retailers to offer a software catalogue without keeping a packaged copy of every title in stock, useful if sales were too low for shops to justify maintaining an inventory.

In 1992, Amiga Power magazine, in response to a letter to the editor from Software on Demand Ltd., criticised the inferior packaging and appearance of the duplicated disks. The magazine argued that these reduced the perceived value of an EDOS release compared with a conventionally manufactured copy.

Software on Demand Ltd. terminated its operating activities in 1994.

== See also ==
- Digital distribution
- Software distribution
- Nintendo Power, a later Nintendo game-writing service
