= WATIAC =

Tool for teaching assembly language

WATIAC was a virtual computer developed for teaching the principles of assembly language programming to undergraduates. WATIAC, and the WATMAP assembly language that ran on it were developed in 1973 by the newly founded Computer Systems Group, at the University of Waterloo, under the direction of Wes Graham.

In the 1970s most programming was conducted through batch stream processing, where the operating systems of the day, like IBM`s OS-360, would allow a single program to use all the resources of a large computer, for a limited period of time. Since student programs were only run a few times, possibly only once, after they had been successfully written, and debugged, efficient running of those programs was of relatively little importance, compared with quick compilation and relatively good error messages.

Waterloo had been a leader in writing single pass, compile-and-go teaching compilers, with first its WATFOR FORTRAN compiler, and its WATBOL COBOL compiler. WATMAP was developed to be a similar compile-and-go teaching compiler.
