= WASM =

WASM or wasm may refer to:

- WebAssembly (Wasm), a portable binary-code format and instruction set architecture
- WASM (FM), a radio station (91.1 FM) licensed to Natchez, Mississippi, United States
- Western Australian School of Mines, a mining education institution in Kalgoorlie and Perth, Western Australia
- Watcom Assembler, an x86 assembler
- Merdei Airport (ICAO code), in Indonesia
