= ICON (microcomputer) =

Personal computer

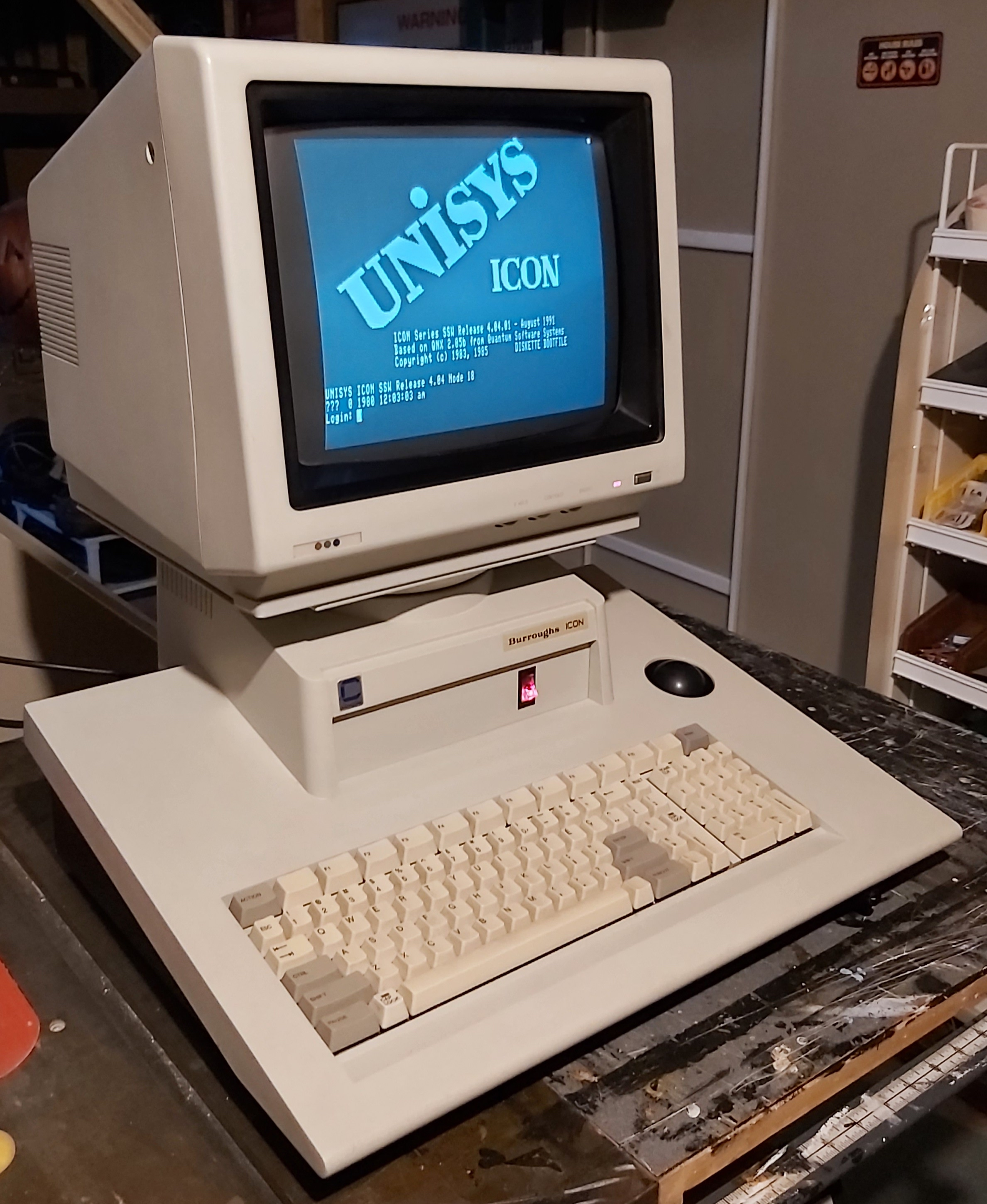
- An early model ICON from the Burroughs era
- Manufacturer: CEMCorp, Burroughs, Unisys
- Type: Personal computer
- Released: August 1984; 42 years ago
- Discontinued: 1994; 32 years ago (support ceased)
- Operating system: QNX
- CPU: Intel 80186 @ 7.16 MHz
- Memory: 384 KB; 1 MB in ICON-II
- Display: EGA monitor
- Graphics: HD46505SP video controller, NAPLPS
- Sound: TMS5220 speech chip

The ICON (also the CEMCorp ICON, Burroughs ICON, and Unisys ICON, and nicknamed the bionic beaver) was a networked personal computer built specifically for use in schools, to fill a standard created by the Ontario Ministry of Education. It was based on the Intel 80186 CPU and ran an early version of QNX, a Unix-like operating system. The system was packaged as an all-in-one machine similar to the Commodore PET, and included a trackball for mouse-like control. Over time, a number of GUI-like systems appeared for the platform, based on the system's NAPLPS-based graphics system.

The ICON was widely used in the mid to late 1980s, but disappeared after that time with the widespread introduction of PCs and Apple Macintoshes.

== History ==
=== Development ===
==== Origin ====
In 1981, four years after the first microcomputers for mainstream consumers appeared, the Ontario Ministry of Education sensed that microcomputers could be an important component of education. In June the Minister of Education, Bette Stephenson, announced the need for computer literacy for all students and formed the Advisory Committee on Computers in Education to guide their efforts. She stated that:

It is now clear that one of the major goals that education must add to its list of purposes, is computer literacy. The world of the very near future requires that all of us have some understanding of the processes and uses of computers.

According to several contemporary sources, Stephenson was the driving force behind the project; "whenever there was a problem she appears to have 'moved heaven and earth' to get it back on the tracks."

The Ministry recognized that a small proportion of teachers and other school personnel were already quite involved with microcomputers and that some schools were acquiring first-generation machines. These acquisitions were uneven, varying in brand and model not just between school boards, but among schools within boards and even classroom to classroom. Among the most popular were the Commodore PET which had a strong following in the new computer programming classes due to its tough all-in-one construction and built-in support for Microsoft BASIC, and the Apple II which had a wide variety of educational software, mostly aimed at early education.

The Ministry wanted to encourage uses of microcomputers that supported its curriculum guidelines and was willing to underwrite the development of software for that purpose. However, the wide variety of machines being used meant that development costs had to be spread over several platforms. Additionally, many of the curriculum topics they wanted to cover required more storage or graphics capability than at least some of the machines then in use, if not all of them. Educational software was in its infancy, and many hardware acquisitions were made without a clear provision for educational software or a plan for use.

A series of Policy Memos followed outlining the Committee's views. Policy Memo 47 stated that computers are to be used creatively, and for information retrieval; at the time most systems were used solely for programming. They also announced funding for the development of educational software on an estimated 6000 machines. The Ministry decided that standardizing the computers would reduce maintenance costs, and allow for the development of consistent educational software. The Ministry contracted the Canadian Advanced Technology Alliance (CATA) to help develop specifications for the new system.

==== Design selection ====
Policy Memos 68–73 followed in early 1983, stating that none of the existing platforms had all the qualities needed to be truly universal. The idea of a new machine quickly gained currency, with the added bonus that it would help develop a local microcomputer industry. In order to make the new machine attractive, the Ministry agreed to fund up to 75% of the purchase price from their own budget. When the plan was first announced there was widespread concern among educators. Their main complaint is that the Ministry would select a standard that was not powerful enough for their needs. A secondary concern was that the time delay between announcing and introducing the computer would be lengthy, a period in which existing purchases could be funded instead.

The first set of concerns were rendered moot when the specifications were introduced in March 1983 in the "Functional Requirements for Microcomputers for Educational Use in Ontario Schools—Stage I." The physical design required a PET-like all-in-one case, headphones output for voice and sound effects, and a trackball for mouse-like pointing support. Inside the case, the specification called for a processor and support systems to allow a multitasking operating system to be used, selecting the Intel 80186 as the CPU. Colour graphics were specified, at least as an option, along with monochrome and colour monitors on top. Voice synthesis was built in, and the keyboard provided for accented characters. Additionally, the systems would include no local storage at all, and would instead rely on a networked file server containing a hard drive.

The specification was considerably in advance of the state of the art of the time, and when it was delivered commentators immediately reversed their earlier concerns and suggested the machine was too powerful, and would therefore be available in too small numbers.

==== CEMCORP ====
To deliver such a machine, Robert Arn, a member of the CATA team, set up CEMCORP, the Canadian Educational Microprocessor Corporation. When the specification was announced in 1983, CEMCORP was announced as the winner of a $10 million contract to develop and supply the initial machines. An additional $5 million in funding was announced to cover development of new software applications, while the Ontario Institute for Studies in Education (OISE) was asked to convert 30 existing programs to the new machine. In order to be able to afford what was expected to be an expensive machine, the Ministry announced a special "Recognized Extraordinary Expenditure" (REE) grant that would provide for up to 75% of the purchase costs of machines meeting the "Grant Eligible Microcomputer Systems" or "G.E.M.S." specifications.

At the time, only the ICON met the GEMS requirements, which cut its purchase price from around CAD$2500 to a mere $495 (USD$2700 and $696) – less expensive than most existing microcomputers. The entire program was politically explosive throughout its gestation as a result, causing a continual stream of news stories. Critics complained that other machines could be bought for half the cost, but supporters pushed back that no other machine at that price point supported the GEMS specifications. The release of the IBM Personal Computer/AT in 1984 reopened the debate and made nightly news, as it used a newer and more advanced CPU than the ICON: the 80286. Around this time other platforms, such as the Waterloo PORT networking system, gained approval for the government support that had originally been the province of the ICON.

=== Production ===
The basic ICON design had reached "beta quality" after just over a year, using off the shelf parts, the hardware manufactured by Microtel and operating system from Quantum Software Systems. The original Microtel machines were first introduced to Ontario schools in 1984 in small numbers, packaged in a short-lived dark brown case. At this point Burroughs Canada was brought in to sell and support the machine. Soon, Sperry and Burroughs merged to form Unisys in 1986. Several generations of ICON machines were produced, evolving steadily to become more PC-like. They were built into the early 1990s, but by this point were used almost entirely for running MS-DOS and Windows programs.

=== Cancellation ===
Throughout the project's lifetime it was subject to continual debate and much political rhetoric. A 1992 article on the topic complained:

Bette Stephenson favoured top-down decision making and as a result got trapped by her tunnel vision. Her ICON computer fiasco drained millions from the provincial treasury and created a white elephant scorned by boards and shunned by teachers.... Computer resources were forced upon the school system as a result of a top-down government decision that was taken precipitously and without research.

The Ministry ceased all support for the ICON in 1994, making it orphaned technology, and the Archives of Ontario declined to take ICON hardware and copies of the ICON software, which were destroyed. This was controversial in its own right, as others maintained that it could be sent to other schools that lacked extensive Information Technology. Despite the development of the ICON program, equality among schools was not assured because each school community could afford different capital outlays depending on the parents' affluence.

== Design ==
The ICON system was based on a workstation/file server model, with no storage local to the workstations. The workstations and servers were internally similar, based on Intel 80186 microprocessors running at 7.16 MHz, and connected to each other using ARCNET. Several upgrades were introduced into the ICON line over time. The ICON2 sported a redesigned case, a detached keyboard with integrated trackball, expanded RAM, and facilities for an internal hard disk. The CPU was upgraded to the 386 in the Series III, while an "ICON-on-a-card" for PCs also appeared.

The original ICON workstations were housed in a large wedge-shaped steel case, with a full-sized keyboard mounted slightly left-of-centre and a trackball mounted to the right. A rubber bumper-strip ran along the front edge, a precaution against a particular type of cut users sometimes got from the PET's sharp case. Graphics were generated by a Hitachi HD46505 SP video controller, supporting NAPLPS. The EGA monitor was mounted on top of a tilt-and-swivel mount, a welcome improvement on the PET. It also included TI's TMS5220 speech chip, originally designed for the TI-99, and would speak the vaguely obscene word "dhtick" when starting up. Early Microtel machines were dark brown, but the vast majority of examples in the classroom were a more nondescript beige.

The fileserver, sometimes referred to as the LexICON, was a simple rectangular box with an internal 10MB hard drive and a 5.25" floppy drive opening to the front, and parallel port for a shared printer. Later Lexicons included a 64MB hard disk, divided into two partitions. User accounts on the ICON were created on the hard drive, and the users had to use Unix commands to copy files to a floppy if needed. This contrasts with the system seen on PET computers of the same era, where the user saved files directly to the shared floppy as if they were attached to the local machine.

Both the client and server ran the Unix-like QNX as their operating system with the addition of network file-sharing, the basic portions of it embedded in ROM. To this they added a NAPLPS/Telidon-based graphics system, which was intended to be used with the trackball to make interactive programs. The system included a Paint programme that used the trackball, but did not include a usable GUI, although there were several attempts to produce one. QNX 2.0.1 included a modest one called "House", and another was built at least to the prototype stage by Helicon Systems in Toronto and appeared in one form as Ambience, though its capabilities were limited. A later upgrade called ICONLook improved upon this greatly, but it was apparently too slow to use realistically. Helicon Systems also produced a MIDI interface for the original ICON.

The biggest problem for the machine was a lack of software. The ICON was originally designed to let teachers create and share their own lessonware, using a simple hypertext-based system where pages could either link to other pages or run programs written in C. The "anyone can create lessonware" model was rejected by the Ministry of Education before the ICON shipped (in favour of a model under which the Ministry funded and controlled all lessonware), leaving the ICON with only the QNX command line interface and the Cemcorp-developed text editor application.

The various Watcom programming languages were quickly ported to the system, but beyond that, the educational software teachers could expect was few and far between. The Ministry contracted for a number of applications, but the small target market and the sometimes difficult process required to secure such contracts were significant obstacles for realistic commercial development.

== Software ==
- The Bartlett Saga, a four-part game about the History of Canada; consisting of Part I: Refugees in the Wilderness: United Empire Loyalists, 1784-1793; Part II: The Rebels: Rebellion in Upper Canada, 1830-1844; Part III: United We Stand: Confederation, 1864-1873; Part IV: The Golden West: Settling the Plains, 1897-1911
- Build-A-Bird [Ergonomics Lab, University of Toronto]
- Cargo Sailor (1987), a game about delivering goods to different ports around the world, given the latitude and longitude.
- Crosscountry Canada, a game of travelling across Canada in a truck, picking up and delivering cargo.
- Ernie's Big Splash, a video game including Sesame Street characters.
- Logo, an implementation of the Logo programming language.
- Northwest Fur Trader, educational software simulating the fur trade in Canada.
- Lemonade Stand, an educational game of setting lemonade prices based on the weather forecast.
- A Day in the Life Of, a strange game following the life of a student. There was an arcade game inside it where you could catch rabbits.
- Spectricon, the drawing software. It used a relatively beautiful noise generator to create dithering patterns.
- Offshore Fishing, A fishing game that utilizes both a top down map view to choose your fishing location, and a 2D side view when fishing. You try to catch fish using a trolling boat and net, and sell them for money. However, it is best to avoid the shark at all costs as he will break through your fishing net.
- Watfor, the WATCOM FORTRAN programming language.
- Chat, the OS included facilities for sending system-wide messages, which students abused often.
- Robot R&D, a game of creating robots of various properties from various parts, then testing them through dropping, crushing and dunking
- Peggy's Way Home, A game where you help Peggy find her way home, so she can cook dinner for people in another game called Peggy's Potluck.
- Peggy's Potluck, A game where you place various ingredients of your choice into a cauldron, cook them, and then serve it to hungry people. It will then give you feedback on what the people think of your meal.
- Mathrace, a game where you would race against computer opponents either all as runners, bicyclists, or horseback riders, by solving math problems to move your avatar forward until you reach the finish line
- Math Maze, a game in which you would crawl through a dungeon, solving math problems to progress at certain points
- Phrase Animée, a french program in which you would select a noun, a verb, and another noun, and an animated graphic would act the scenario out
