= Tas Tsonis =

- Born: 1951 (age 74–75); Greece
- Other names: Anastasios Tsonis
- Occupation: computer scientist
- Known for: Entrepreneurship in the computer software industry since 1975

Tas Tsonis is a computer scientist who continues to play a prominent role in using graphical algorithms, computer science, and computational geometry to automate the personalization of apparel and accessories. He has been granted twelve US patents based on mathematical and graphical algorithms.

Tsonis co-founded Pulse Microsystems in 1982, with Brian Goldberg. Pulse is credited with "the first set of pattern archiving software, network management software and data acquisition software for embroidery industry." They patented methods to take artwork, stored using scalable vector graphics, and translate those into instruction for knitting and embroidery machines, enabling artwork to be incorporated into fabrics at the best resolution possible for the fabric under construction.

In 2004 Tsonis and Goldberg co-founded Viigo, a firm that developed app software.

Tsonis is a graduate of the University of Waterloo, and, in 2016, was honoured by the University with its annual J.W. Graham Medal. Each year the award recognizes one of the University's graduates who has played a significant role in the use of computers.
