= Ian Goulden =

Canadian and British mathematician

Ian P. Goulden
- Education: University of Waterloo
- Awards: Fellow, Royal Society of Canada (2012)
- Scientific career
- Fields: Mathematics
- Workplaces: University of Waterloo
- Thesis: Combinatorial Decompositions in the Theory of Algebraic Enumeration (1979)
- Doctoral advisor: David M. Jackson
- Website: uwaterloo.ca/math/ian-gouldens-home-page

Ian P. Goulden is a Canadian and British mathematician. He works as a professor at the University of Waterloo in the department of Combinatorics and Optimization. He obtained his PhD from the University of Waterloo in 1979 under the supervision of David M. Jackson. His PhD thesis was titled Combinatorial Decompositions in the Theory of Algebraic Enumeration. Goulden is well known for his contributions in enumerative combinatorics such as the Goulden-Jackson cluster method.

Goulden was the dean at the University of Waterloo Faculty of Mathematics from 2010 to 2015 and served as chair of the Department of Combinatorics and Optimization three times.

== Awards and honors ==
In 2010 Goulden was elected as a Fellow of the Royal Society of Canada. In 2009 received the University of Waterloo Faculty of Mathematics Award for Distinction in Teaching, and in 1976 he received the Alumni Gold Medal for highest academic achievement at the University of Waterloo.

== Contributions ==
Goulden and Jackson published the book Combinatorial Enumeration. Goulden also published the book Finite Mathematics with R.G. Dunkley, R.J. MacKay, K.S. Brown, R.F. de Peiza, D.A. DiFelice, and D.E. Matthews. He has written over 90 research articles in the fields of Combinatorics, Enumerative Combinatorics, and Algebraic Geometry.

== Selected publications ==
- Goulden, I. P. and Jackson, D. M. (2004). Combinatorial Enumeration. ISBN 0486435970.
- Goulden, I. P.; Jackson, David M.; Vakil, R. (2005). "Towards the Geometry of Double Hurwitz Numbers". Advances in Mathematics. 198: 43–92. arXiv:math/0309440. doi:10.1016/j.aim.2005.01.008. S2CID 8872816.
- Goulden, I. P.; Jackson, D. M.; Vainshtein, A (2000). "The number of ramified coverings of the sphere by the torus and surfaces of higher genera". Annals of Combinatorics. 4: 27–46. arXiv:math/9902125. doi:10.1007/PL00001274. S2CID 16725623.
- Goulden, I. P.; Jackson, D. M. (1997). "Transitive factorisations into transpositions and holomorphic mappings on the sphere". Proc. Amer. Math. Soc. 125: 381–436. doi:10.1090/S0002-9939-97-03880-X.

== See also ==
- List of University of Waterloo people
