= Ian McPhee (computer scientist) =

Canadian computer scientist

- Occupation: computer scientist

Ian McPhee is a Canadian computer scientist, entrepreneur, and philanthropist. He earned a Bachelor of Mathematics in 1973, and his Masters of Mathematics in 1979.

When McPhee was an undergraduate at the University of Waterloo he was a protege of influential professor Wes Graham. Graham assigned McPhee to work on Watfor, a Fortran compiler optimized for efficiently compiling the typical student program. McPhee continued to work for Graham, until 1981 when he co-founded Watcom with other associates of Graham. Watcom is characterized as the first spin-off company to come from Waterloo.

McPhee became Watcom's President, in 1986.

McPhee became an executive at Sybase when it acquired Watcom.

In 1995 McPhee became the first recipient of the annual J.W. Graham Medal, named after his mentor. Later he would chair the medal's annual selection committee.

McPhee would serve as an executive or director of several more successful software companies, currently being a director at NexJ Systems Inc. He is also a member of the University of Waterloo's Board of Governors, as well as making notable donations.
