= Adaptive partition scheduler =

Scheduling algorithm

Adaptive partition schedulers are a relatively new type of partition scheduler, which in turn is a kind of scheduling algorithm, pioneered with the most recent version of the QNX operating system. Adaptive partitioning, or AP, allows the real-time system designer to request that a percentage of processing resources be reserved for a particular partition (group of threads and/or processes making up a subsystem). The operating system's priority-driven pre-emptive scheduler will behave in the same way that a non-AP system would until the system is overloaded (i.e. system-wide there is more computation to perform than the processor is capable of sustaining over the long term). During overload, the AP scheduler enforces hard limits on total run-time for the subsystems within a partition, as dictated by the allocated percentage of processor bandwidth for the particular partition.

If the system is not overloaded, a partition that is allocated (for example) 10% of the processor bandwidth, can, in fact, use more than 10%, as it will borrow from the spare budget of other partitions (but will be required to pay it back later). This is very useful for the non real-time subsystems that experience variable load, since these subsystems can make use of spare budget from hard real-time partitions in order to make more forward progress than they would in a fixed partition scheduler such as ARINC-653, but without impacting the hard real-time subsystems' deadlines.

QNX Neutrino 6.3.2 and newer versions have this feature.
