= IvanAnywhere =

Ian and IvanAnywhere in a meeting

IvanAnywhere is a simple, remote-controlled telepresence robot created by Sybase iAnywhere programmers to enable their co-worker, Ivan Bowman, to efficiently remote work. The robot enables Bowman to be virtually present at conferences and presentations, and to discuss product development with other developers face-to-face. IvanAnywhere is powered by SAP's mobile database product, SQL Anywhere.

== IvanAnywhere evolution ==
Ivan Bowman has been a software developer at Sybase/iAnywhere/SAP since 1993, and now is an Engineering Director at SAP Canada. In 2002 his wife received a job in Halifax approximately 2,000 km (1,200 mi) from his place of work in Waterloo, Ontario, Canada, North America. His employers allowed him to remote work initially via email, instant messenger, and phone.

Using speakerphone during meetings was less than ideal because Ivan could not see his co-workers' visual communication clues, or what they wrote on the white board. The first solution was a stationary webcam with a speaker, which was kept in the corner of the office. The problem with this method was that the webcam was just that – stationary. Ivan could not see people if they were not standing near the webcam. More frustrating, perhaps, was that Ivan could hear distant conversations through the webcam's microphone, but was unable to contribute to the conversation if the impromptu meeting did not take place in his visual range.

=== Proof of concept ===
In November 2006, iAnywhere programmer Ian McHardy and Director of Engineering Glenn Paulley (Ivan’s immediate manager) conceived the idea of IvanAnywhere after Glenn saw a television commercial for a remote controlled toy blimp. In January 2007, after considering different possible designs and getting through a number of deadlines related to iAnywhere releases, Ian started working on a proof-of-concept: a tablet computer and webcam mounted on a radio-controlled toy truck.

In February 2007, even though the truck was challenging to drive and the webcam was only a few inches above the floor, Ivan was able to successfully drive the proof-of-concept from Halifax.

=== Full version ===
In May 2007, Ivan started using Ian's full version daily. The full version of IvanAnywhere consists of a wheeled base with 24-volt SuperDroid Robots motors. The motor and wheel assemblies support "tank drive" so that Ivan can negotiate through doorways and meeting rooms more easily. Above the motors sits a box filled with wires, various electronics, and batteries which power the robot for a full work day. The entire robot weighs approximately 40 kg or 88 Pounds.

A 1.5 meter (5 foot) aluminum bar supports a webcam with a gray foam ball mounted above it. The robot is equipped with a webcam, speakers, microphone, and a tablet computer with a live feed from Bowman's webcam to help coworkers to communicate with him more naturally. Infrared proximity sensors keep the robot from bumping into walls and cubicles.

The tablet PC mounted on IvanAnywhere runs a SQL Anywhere database server. One of the tasks of the SQL Anywhere database is to retain monitoring statistics on a wide variety of controls and sensors on the robot. This is so that Ian can monitor how far the robot travels in any particular period, how many times the proximity sensors have halted the robot's motion, the robot's network connectivity uptime, and other related statistics.

Ivan "drives" the robot from his home office in Halifax using a two-joystick PC gaming console. One joystick controls the webcam, the other the robot's drive system.

In October 2007, a digital camera was mounted on the bar so that Ivan could take high-resolution pictures of whiteboards, presentation slides, and overheads, or just look out the window.

The robot needs to be recharged at the end of every work day. Until recently, this required a Waterloo co-worker to plug it in before leaving for the night. In May 2008, Ian constructed a charging bay out of lumber that Ivan "drives" into - copper bars attached to the robot connect to copper springs on the charging unit which are directly connected to the battery charger and enabled through a relay circuit so that the charging bars are not live unless the robot is in the bay. The charging bay permits Ivan to recharge the robot at his convenience, and without assistance.

IvanAnywhere is very popular with other people in the building and the SAP Engineering floor has become a regular stop on visitor tours of the SAP building.

== Challenges of Being a Robot ==
Although most of Bowman's colleagues treat IvanAnywhere as one of their own, people who aren't used to the robot are sometimes uncomfortable talking to it instead of a human being.

== See also ==
- Computer-supported collaboration
- Homeshoring

== Bibliography ==
- THE GLOBE AND MAIL, Careers section, July 11, 2008
- Christian Science Monitor: Send Your Robot To Work
- YES Mag - Featured in the "Robot replacement" article (p. 7) of Jan/Feb 2008 edition of YES Mag
- The Record: Meet IvanAnywhere
- Guardian Unlimited: The Worker You Have to Plug In
- The Chronicle Herald: Ivan the mobile
