= PowerBuilder =

Software development tool

Appeon PowerBuilder
- Developer: SAP/Appeon
- Initial release: July 1992
- Stable release: PowerBuilder 2025 / May 7, 2025
- Preview release: None
- Written in: C++ and C#
- Operating system: Microsoft Windows
- Available in: English, Japanese for the IDE (numerous languages supported for deployed applications)
- Type: IDE
- License: Commercial
- Website: www.appeon.com

PowerBuilder is an integrated development environment owned by SAP since the acquisition of Sybase in 2010. On July 5, 2016, SAP and Appeon entered into an agreement whereby Appeon, an independent company, would be responsible for developing, selling, and supporting PowerBuilder.

Over the years, PowerBuilder has been updated with new standards. In 2010, a major upgrade of PowerBuilder was released to provide support for the Microsoft .NET Framework. In 2014, support was added for OData, dockable windows, and 64-bit native applications. In 2019 support was added for rapidly creating RESTful Web APIs and non-visual .NET assemblies using the C# language and the .NET Core framework. And PowerScript client app development was revamped with new UI technologies and cloud architecture. In 2025 the IDE was revamped with new code editor and a faster compiler.

Appeon has been releasing new features every 6-12 month cycles, which per the product roadmap focus on four key focus areas: sustaining core features, modernizing application UI, improving developer productivity, and incorporating more Cloud technology.

== Features ==
PowerBuilder has a native data-handling component called a DataWindow, which can be used to create, edit, and display data from a database. This object gives the programmer a number of tools for specifying and controlling user interface appearance and behavior, and also provides simplified access to database content and JSON or XML from Web services. To some extent, the DataWindow frees the programmer from considering the differences between Database Management Systems from different vendors. DataWindow can display data using multiple presentation styles and can connect to various data sources.

== Usage ==
PowerBuilder is used primarily for building business-oriented CRUD applications.

Although new software products are rarely built with PowerBuilder, many client-server ERP products and line-of-business applications built in the late 1980s to early 2000s with PowerBuilder still provide core database functions for large enterprises in government, higher education, manufacturing, insurance, banking, energy, and telecommunications.

== History ==
=== Early history ===
PowerBuilder originated from Computer Solutions Inc. (CSI), a software consulting firm founded in 1974 by Mitchell Kertzman in Massachusetts. CSI developed GrowthPower, an MRP II software package with integrated financial modules released in 1981, which ran exclusively on the HP 3000 platform and achieved over 1,000 customer installations at its peak.

In the late 1980s, as demand increased for graphical user interfaces amid the rise of Microsoft Windows, Kertzman partnered with Dave Litwack, former executive vice president of product development at Cullinet Software (acquired by Computer Associates in 1989). Litwack joined the company in 1988 as head of research and development to develop a client/server GUI tool, leading to its rebranding as Powersoft Corporation in 1990.

PowerBuilder 1.0 was released in July 1991 as a rapid application development tool featuring the DataWindow and PowerScript language. Powersoft went public on February 3, 1993, with shares closing at $38 from an initial $20 price.

Sybase announced its acquisition of Powersoft on November 15, 1994, in a stock swap valued at approximately $940 million; the merger closed on February 14, 1995, at a revised value of about $904 million due to Sybase's stock fluctuations.

=== Recent history ===
In December 2013 SAP announced the new version going directly to number 15 and released a beta version. Key features included support for the .NET Framework v4.5, SQL Server 2012, Oracle 12, Windows 8, OData and Dockable Windows. SAP later released this as version 12.6.

On May 31, 2019, PowerBuilder 2019 was released by Appeon. This release supports C# development. It provides a new C# IDE, .NET data access objects, C# migration solution, Web API client, and UI themes.

On April 3, 2020, PowerBuilder 2019 R2 was launched by Appeon. This release includes a first-ever PowerScript-to-C# code converter, which can automatically migrate 80-95% of PowerBuilder business logic and DataWindows to C#. Interoperability between PowerScript and .NET programming languages is also now supported. Many existing features have also been enhanced.

On January 22, 2021, PowerBuilder 2019 R3 was launched by Appeon. This release provides a groundbreaking new app deployment technology called PowerClient, which securely automates the installation and update of client apps over HTTPS. C# Web API development has been greatly enhanced with asynchronous programming and support for Amazon Aurora and Azure cloud databases. Aside from many other new features, PowerBuilder 2019 R3 is a long-term support (LTS) version that replaces previous LTS versions

On August 6, 2021, PowerBuilder 2021 was launched by Appeon. The Cloud deployment capability of the PowerBuilder 2021 IDE, in conjunction with the matching PowerServer 2021 runtime, was revamped, bringing PowerBuilder up-to-date with the latest .NET technologies. The presentation layer now executes PowerScript natively on Windows devices. The middle-tier has been rebuilt around REST API standard with a pure .NET Core implementation. A new CI/CD utility that integrates with Git/SVN and Jenkins, witch compiles all PowerBuilder projects using the command-line interface, was added alongside other features.

On September 4, 2022, PowerBuilder 2022 was launched by Appeon. This release brings enhancements to the productivity of developing both client/server & installable cloud apps and more security measures to safeguard your apps. It includes many new features, including Windows 11 support, introducing time-saving functionalities to the IDE, such as Tabbed Code Editor, Jump to Objects, and Quick Code Search, and supports the latest HTTP/2 and TLS 1.3 protocols and two-way TLS authentication.

On August 4, 2023, PowerBuilder 2022 R2 was launched by Appeon. This release introduces a range of new features aimed at helping developers build powerful, feature-rich, and secure client/server and installable cloud apps more efficiently, including tabbed windows, fillable PDFs, and SMTP client.

On January 8, 2024, PowerBuilder 2022 R3 was launched by Appeon. This release is a long-term support version. Features previously released in earlier releases have been enhanced and/or corrected.

On May 7, 2025, PowerBuilder 2025 was launched by Appeon. This release delivers a revamped IDE that boosts developer productivity throughout the SLDC—from writing and extending code to debugging, automating builds, and deploying applications. It features a new-generation code editor, ultra-fast compiler, automatic REST API creation, faster GIT operations, and codeless UI modernization features.

== Features ==
PowerBuilder is an object-oriented programming language. Nearly all of the visual and non-visual objects support inheritance, polymorphism, and encapsulation. The programmer may utilize a common code framework such as PowerBuilder Foundation Classes, also known as PFC, to inherit objects from and leverage pre-existing code.

The DataWindow is the key component (and selling point) of PowerBuilder. The DataWindow offers a visual SQL painter which supports outer joins, unions and subquery operations. It can convert SQL to visual representation and back, so the developer can use native SQL if desired. DataWindow updates are automatic — it produces the proper SQL at runtime based on the DBMS to which the user is currently connected. This feature makes it easier for developers who are not experienced with SQL.

The DataWindow also has the built-in ability to both retrieve data and update data via stored procedures or REST Web APIs as well as import/export JSON data. The RESTClient object introduced in PowerBuilder 2017 facilitates bridging the DataWindow with REST Web APIs and requiring minimal coding.

=== RDBMS interfaces ===
PowerBuilder offers native interfaces to all major databases, as well as ODBC and OLE-DB, in the Enterprise version. There are many connectivity options that allow performance monitoring and tuning, such as:

1. Integrated security
2. Tracing of all SQL
3. Isolation level
4. Password expiration dialog
5. Blocking factor
6. Number of SQL statements to cache
7. Use connection pool
8. Thread safety
9. Trace ODBC API calls

Due to the information about the database schema (such as primary key information) that are stored in PowerBuilder's data dictionary, the code required to implement data display and browsing is greatly simplified, because the dictionary information allows generation of the appropriate SQL behind the scenes.

PowerBuilder supports the following ways of interacting with a database:

DataWindow
this is the simplest approach, relying on automatically generated SQL.
Embedded SQL
Embedded SQL supports SELECT, INSERT, UPDATE, DELETE and cursors. This option is used when the developer desires more control than is available with the DataWindow option.

Example:

 UPDATE my_employee SET STATUS = 'A';
 IF sqlca.sqlcode <> 0 THEN ...

Dynamic SQL
This is a form of parameterized SQL, where the user builds a string that may optionally have bind variables. Dynamic SQL may be used to create cursors as well.

=== Integration with third-party software ===
PowerBuilder supports ActiveX and OCX controls, both visible and non-visible. It also can use OLE Automation as a client. However, PowerBuilder supports only late binding, not early binding. Therefore, when using OLE Automation, a dropdown of possible actions is not provided. PowerBuilder can also act as a DDE client or server, providing a further mechanism to interoperate with other applications.

PowerBuilder can make Windows and third-party API calls, and, in general, works well with third-party libraries in DLL files, however it does not directly support callback functions.

=== Compilation and debugging ===
PowerBuilder offers a "/pbdebug" (or variants: "-pbdebug", "-pbd", "/debug", "-debug", "-deb") runtime switch, which creates a log file. This can help track down a bug "in the field", as the user simply emails this log file to the developer. It has another feature which can log all SQL statements to a file. It also has built-in performance profiling, an integrated debugger, context-sensitive help, and an active newsgroup to provide support.

PowerBuilder applications are typically compiled to p-code, which is then interpreted by the PowerBuilder runtime environment. An application can also be compiled to machine code, which can sometimes offer a performance benefit.

== Criticism ==
Extensibility of the language was rather limited for older versions of PowerBuilder. To develop a solution that includes external C++ code may not only require a competent C++ developer, but also a PowerBuilder expert to guide the developer through the myriad subtleties of the language and the PowerBuilder Virtual Machine.

Inheritance and object-oriented features are limited to some object types (Windows, Userobjects and Menus). In particular, it is not possible to inherit from a DataWindow. A PowerBuilder user cannot open a descendant and a parent at the same time in the painter, though they can see all ancestors' code while working on the descendant.

To address these criticisms, Appeon has set a new roadmap for PowerBuilder, which it publishes openly on the Appeon Website. Amongst developers, the (classic) PowerScript language itself, which is still available for compatibility reasons, is known as a "language built around the DataWindow", and PowerBuilder is known as the "IDE built around the DataWindow". C# development centered around a new .NET DataWindow with automated migration of existing DataWindows was introduced in PowerBuilder 2019.

== Community ==
Since Appeon took over PowerBuilder, it has launched a new official community website for PowerBuilder developers. This community website offers technical articles, webinars, and Q&A, which are authored by community users. Appeon also hosts an annual user conference called Appeon Elevate, and recordings of the conference sessions are available from the conference website. There are a number of local user groups around the world that cooperate with Appeon to deliver abridged versions of the conference in seminar format and local language.

There are also a variety of grassroots community groups and resources for PowerBuilder developers to share and convene. PowerBuilderTV is series of webinars by PowerBuilder users and vendors that tend to focus on third party add-ons. PowerBuilder Central is a community initiative to create a single source for third party add-ons and services.

== PowerBuilder Tools ==
- Appeon PowerServer - Deploys existing or new PowerBuilder projects as cloud-native applications that runs on .NET Core with support for almost every single PowerBuilder feature, including the PFC framework.
- Visual Expert for PowerBuilder - Visual Expert helps in sharing the knowledge of your applications. It also automates impact analysis and checks code quality.
- Enable Multilingual - Enable makes PowerBuilder applications multilingual quickly and easily. Using Enable, developers can only need to make a few small changes to the original PowerBuilder code to go from monolingual to multilingual.
- ProDiff for PowerBuilder - ProDiff is designed to highlight the differences between versions of PowerBuilder development source code.
- Visual Guard for PowerBuilder - Visual Guard is an access control and application-level permissions tool. It helps you centralize view and control of users and their rights in PowerBuilder applications.
- STD Framework for PowerBuilder - A free object-oriented development framework for PowerBuilder Classic, Web Services, Appeon PowerServer Web and Mobile.
- Ultimate Suite for PB - A suite of controls, written in PowerScript, that modernizes the GUI of PowerBuilder applications; Ultimate Suite for PB gives applications a contemporary look and makes them more user-friendly.
- AscentialTest - Automated testing for PowerBuilder, web, and others. Deep integration with the PowerBuilder VM api's allow AT to see and understand PB objects.
- PowerGen - Automated build and regeneration of PowerBuilder applications. Supports building directly from Source Control.
