= Software distribution =

Process of delivering software and the content used in that process

Software distribution is the process of delivering software and it is the asset that contains the data used in the process.

== Free software distribution tools ==
GNU Autotools are widely used for which consist of source files written in C++ and the C programming language, but are not limited to these.

== Commercial software distribution tools ==
- LANDesk Management Suite provides software distribution for Windows, OS X, and Linux.
- Dell KACE provides remote administration, software distribution, and software installation to any Windows, Mac, or Linux desktop or server.

== Distribution tools for mobile devices ==
Distribution of software to small mobile devices such as phones, PDAs and other hand-held terminals is a particular challenge due to their inconsistent connection to the Internet. Some tools that cater to this category of devices are:

- Sybase iAnywhere Afaria

== See also ==
- Provisioning (technology)
