= Open Watcom Assembler =

X86 assembler

- Original author: Open Watcom Assembler
- Operating system: MS-DOS, Windows, Linux for x86-based PCs, OS/2 for x86-based PCs, FreeBSD for x86-based PCs.
- Available in: English
- Type: x86 assembler
- Website: www.openwatcom.com

Open Watcom Assembler (WASM) is an x86 assembler produced by Watcom, based on the Watcom Assembler found in Watcom C/C++ compiler and Watcom FORTRAN 77. Further development is being done on the 32- and 64-bit JWASM project, which more closely matches the syntax of Microsoft's assembler.

There are experimental assemblers for PowerPC, Alpha AXP, and MIPS.

== Technical details ==
=== Assembler ===
- Native support for output formats Intel OMF output formats.
- Supports Intel x86 (Pentium MMX, Pentium III-4, 3DNow!, SSE and SSE2) instruction sets.
- Supports Microsoft macro assembler (MASM) 5 and 6 syntax (incomplete).

=== Disassembler ===
There is an associated Watcom disassembler, wdis. The assembler does not have listing facilities; instead the use of wdis for generating listings is recommended. wdis can read OMF, COFF and ELF object files and PE and ELF executables. It supports 16-bit and 32-bit x86 instruction set including MMX, 3DNow!, SSE, SSE2, and SSE3. Support for PowerPC, Alpha AXP, MIPS, and SPARC V8 instruction sets is also built in.

== WASM forks ==
=== JWasm ===
JWasm is a fork of Wasm originated by Japheth with following features:

- Native support for output formats Intel OMF (16/32-bit), MS COFF (32-bit and 64-bit), ELF (32-bit and 64-bit), Bin and DOS MZ.
- Precompiled JWasm binaries are available for DOS, Windows and Linux. For OS/2 and FreeBSD, makefiles are supplied.
- Supports Intel x86 (8086, 80186, 80286, 80386, 80486, Pentium, Pentium Pro), x86-64 instruction sets with SIMD (MMX, 3DNow!, SSE, SSE2, SSE3 and SSSE3, SSE4.1/2 (since Jwasm), AVX (since JWasm 2.06), VMX (Intel VT-x; AMD SVM, the latter though already implemented, currently still inactive) extensions (since JWasm 2.09)).
- JWasm is written in C. The source is portable and has successfully been tested with Open Watcom, MS VC, GCC and more.
- On Windows, JWasm can be used with both Win32Inc and Masm32. Since v2.01, it will also work with Sven B. Schreiber's SBS WALK32 Win32 Assembly Language Kit
- C header files can be converted to include files for JWasm with Japheth's own dedicated h2incX.
- JWasm's source code is released under the Sybase Open Watcom Public License, which allows free commercial and non-commercial use.
- Fully supports Microsoft macro assembler 6 syntax, all MASM 8 instructions sets.

Japheth paused development (or rather, was out of contact) of JWASM in January 2014 with version 2.12pre, but currently continues work on project on GitHub, current (June 2024) version is 2.18. Also, others on the Masm32 forum picked up where Japheth once left off.

=== HJWasm ===
HJWasm, adding the prefix H in reference to Masm32 forum member Habran who started off this second WASM development continuation. Version 2.13pre was originally announced in 2016. New features include:

- Instructions:

- SIMD:

- MMX: MOVQ added in 2.13, to supplement MOVD.
- AVX2: VGATHERDPD, VGATHERQPD, VGATHERDPS, VGATHERQPS, VPGATHERDD, VPGATHERQD, VPGATHERDQ, VPGATHERQQ, VEX-encoded general purpose instructions added in 2.13. Remaining instructions added in 2.16.
- AVX-512: VCMPxxPD, VCMPxxPS, VCMPxxSD, VCMPxxPD, VCMPxxSS, AVX-512F set, EVEX-encoded instructions added in 2.13; VMOVQ added 2.13, to supplement MOVD. Remaining instructions added in 2.16.

- Random Number Generator: RDRAND, RDSEED added in 2.13.
- half-precision conversions: F16C (VCVTPH2PS, VCVTPS2PH) added in 2.13.
- Intel MPX: Added in 2.31.

- Registers: RIP, ZMM registers added in 2.13.
- OO language extension added in 2.25.

=== HASM ===
HASM is a renamed version of HJWASM, starting in version 2.33. The name was used following a MASM Forum discussion thread that originally proposed a replacement name. The name HASM was proposed by forum member habran in Reply #6, and was finalized at the end of discussion thread at Reply #33. No known features are added in HASM's release cycle.

=== UASM ===
The name was actually used in version 2.33 (dated 2017-05-20) at Terraspace ltd's product page, but it was only announced in version 2.34. Changes to HJWASM includes:

- Instruction sets: RDPID added in 2.38.

- AVX-512: VAESDEC added in 2.38
- Data transfer: MOVBE added in 2.47. MOVABS added in 2.48.
- Intel ADX: ADCX, ADOX added in 2.38
- Intel MPX: Support of BND prefix added in 2.34. BND prefix removed from JCXZ instruction group in 2.40.
- CLMUL instruction set: Added in 2.46.8, including pseudo-op forms of CLMUL.
- Hashing: SHA instruction set added in 2.46.8.
- Supervisor Mode Access Prevention: CLAC added in 2.38.
- Persistent Memory Extensions: CLFLUSHOPT added in 2.38.

- Addressing modes: 64-bit absolute immediate (2.37)
- Identified types

- Record types: fully supports registers and up to 32bit record fields in 2.41.

- Support for 128-bit SIMD: Added in 2.42, inline declaration with the type added in 2.43.1 / .2.

- Support of typedef chain on return types added in 2.46.8.
- m512 built-in types added in 2.47.

- Console color coding: Added for Windows, OSX and Linux in 2.43.1 / .2.
- Function calling: C-style function calling added in 2.46.
