= VX-REXX =

REXX GUI development system for OS/2

VX-REXX is a highly extensible REXX GUI development system for OS/2 developed by Watcom and initially released in 1993.

Much of the new code in eComStation and ArcaOS has been written using VX-REXX.

Though REXX is itself a 3GL, the VX-REXX interface allows you to build REXX programs using a combination of 3GL and 4GL techniques; its drag-and-drop interface to inserting code allows quite complex programs to be built without actually entering any code.

VX-REXX's interface is itself written in VX-REXX, which means that it can be extended and/or modified using REXX code; it also has a number of macro hooks which can be used to add to its functionality directly.

The toolbox contains a number of standard tools (static text, group box, push button, radio button, check box, picture box, image push/radio button, list box, combo box (and drop-down), single and multiline entry field, slider) and some more specialized ones (container, value-set, notebook, DDE client, timer). Additional controls can be built using SOM and distributed as .DLL files; anything from simple variants of existing controls (such as a tri-state check box, or a self-validating entry field) to completely custom-drawn controls (for example, a self-contained tic-tac-toe board) can be written in C, compiled, and added to a VX-REXX project.

VX-REXX won the Editors' Choice award from PC Magazine.
