= Gordon Bell (QNX) =

Canadian software developer and entrepreneur

Gordon Bell is a Canadian software developer and entrepreneur. He is one of the co-creators of the QNX microkernel real-time operating system.

== QNX ==
Bell and Dan Dodge began the project while students at the University of Waterloo in 1980. Bell and Dodge incorporated Quantum Software Systems in the Ottawa suburb of Kanata, Ontario to develop and sell the operating system, originally called QUNIX. AT&T requested the name be changed to avoid encroaching on their UNIX trademark, so QUNIX was renamed QNX. The company name was later changed to QNX Software Systems. The first commercial version of QNX was released for the Intel 8088 central processing unit (CPU) in 1982.

== See also ==
- List of University of Waterloo people
