= David M. Jackson =

Canadian mathematician

David M. R. Jackson
- Education: Cambridge University
- Awards: Fellow, Royal Society of Canada
- Scientific career
- Fields: Mathematics
- Workplaces: University of Waterloo
- Doctoral advisor: Roger Needham
- Doctoral students: Ian Goulden
- Website: www.math.uwaterloo.ca/~dmjackso/

David M.R. Jackson is a professor at the University of Waterloo in the department of combinatorics and optimization. He graduated from Cambridge University in 1969. Jackson has been responsible for many developments in enumerative combinatorics in his career, as well as being a mathematical consultant to the Oxford English Dictionary Project.

He is a Fellow of the Royal Society of Canada and a Member of the Academy of Mathematical and Physical Sciences.

With Ian Goulden, Jackson published the book Combinatorial Enumeration.

== Selected publications ==
- Goulden, I. P.; Jackson, D. M. (2004). Combinatorial Enumeration. ISBN 0486435970.
- Jackson, David M.; Goulden, I. P.; Vakil, R. (2005). "Towards the Geometry of Double Hurwitz Numbers". Advances in Mathematics. 198: 43–92. arXiv:math/0309440. doi:10.1016/j.aim.2005.01.008. S2CID 8872816.
- Jackson, D. M.; Goulden, I. P.; Vainshtein, A (2000). "The number of ramified coverings of the sphere by the torus and surfaces of higher genera". Annals of Combinatorics. 4: 27–46. arXiv:math/9902125. doi:10.1007/PL00001274. S2CID 16725623.
- Jackson, D. M.; Goulden, I. P. (1997). "Transitive factorisations into transpositions and holomorphic mappings on the sphere" (PDF). Proceedings of the American Mathematical Society. 125 (1): 381–436. JSTOR 2161793.

== See also ==
- List of University of Waterloo people
