= Paul H. Cress =

Canadian computer scientist (1939–2004)

- Born: 1939
- Died: October 20, 2004
- Awards: Grace Murray Hopper Award
- Scientific career
- Fields: Computer science
- Institutions: University of Waterloo

Paul H. Cress (1939–2004) was a Canadian computer scientist.

He was a young lecturer in computer science at the University of Waterloo (Waterloo, Ontario, Canada) when, starting in 1966, he and his colleague Paul Dirksen led a team of programmers developing a fast Fortran programming language compiler called WATFOR (WATerloo FORtran), for the IBM System/360 family of computers. The /360 WATFOR project was initiated by Professor J. Wesley Graham, following the successful implementation in 1965 of a WATFOR compiler for the IBM 7040 computer. An enhanced version of the /360 WATFOR compiler was called WATFIV, variously interpreted to mean "WATerloo Fortran IV" or "WATFOR-plus-one".

WATFOR and WATFIV made Fortran programming accessible to university students and researchers and even high schoolers, and largely established Waterloo's early reputation as a centre for software and Computer Science research. In 1972, Cress and Dirksen were joint winners of the Grace Murray Hopper Award from the Association for Computing Machinery, "For the creation of the WATFOR Compiler, the first member of a powerful new family of diagnostic and educational programming tools." Cress died August 20, 2004, aged 65.

== Publications ==
- Paul Cress; Paul Dirksen; James Wesley Graham (1968). FORTRAN IV with WATFOR. Prentice-Hall.
- Paul Cress (1968). Description of /360 WATFOR: a fortran-IV compiler. Dept. of Applied Analysis and Computer Science, Computing Centre, University of Waterloo.
- Paul Cress; Paul Dirksen; James Wesley Graham (1970). FORTRAN IV with WATFOR and WATFIV. Prentice-Hall. ISBN 978-0-13-329433-0.
- Paul Cress; Paul Dirksen; James Wesley Graham (January 1, 1980). Structured FORTRAN with WATFIV-S. Prentice-Hall. ISBN 978-0-13-854752-3.

== See also ==
- List of University of Waterloo people
