= James G. Mitchell =

Canadian computer scientist

James George Mitchell
- Born: Kitchener, Ontario, Canada
- Citizenship: United States
- Education: University of Waterloo, Carnegie Mellon University
- Known for: WATFOR compiler, Mesa (programming language), Spring (operating system), ARM architecture
- Awards: J.W. Graham Medal in Computing and Innovation
- Scientific career
- Fields: Computer science
- Workplaces: Oracle, Sun Microsystems, Acorn Computers, Xerox PARC, Curci Foundation
- Thesis: The design and construction of flexible and efficient interactive programming systems (1970)
- Academic advisors: J. Wesley Graham

James George Mitchell is a Canadian-born computer scientist. He has worked on programming language design and implementation (FORTRAN WATFOR, Mesa, Euclid, C++, Java), interactive programming systems, dynamic interpreting and compiling, document preparing systems, user interface design, distributed transactional file systems, and distributed, object-oriented operating systems. He has also worked on the design of hardware for computer graphics, high-level programming language execution, and audio input/output.

== Biography ==
Mitchell was born in Kitchener, Ontario, Canada. He grew up in Cambridge, Ontario, and graduated with a degree in mathematics from the University of Waterloo in 1966. Mitchell began working with computers in 1962 while a student at the University of Waterloo. He and three other undergraduates developed a fast compiler for the Fortran programming language named WATFOR (Waterloo FORTRAN), for the IBM 7040 computer. The project, initiated by Professor J. Wesley Graham, established Waterloo's early reputation as a centre for software and computer science research by helping the first generation of computer science majors learn to program. He then graduated with a PhD in computer science from Carnegie Mellon University in 1970. His dissertation is titled "The design and construction of flexible and efficient interactive programming systems".

== Career ==
From 1971 to 1984 Mitchell was at the Xerox Palo Alto Research Center (PARC) and eventually became a Xerox Fellow. In 1980–81, he was Senior Visiting Fellow at the University of Cambridge Computer Laboratory. He was head of research and development for Acorn Computers (U.K.), where he managed the development of the first ARM architecture reduced instruction set computer (RISC) chip and was President of the Acorn Research Centre in Palo Alto, California.

Mitchell joined Sun Microsystems in 1988 and was in charge of the Spring distributed, object-oriented operating system research in Sun Microsystems Laboratories and the SunSoft subsidiary. He became Vice President of Technology & Architecture in the JavaSoft Division and then Chief Technology Officer, Java Consumer & Embedded products. Later, he was vice president in charge of Sun Microsystems Laboratories. Subsequently, he became Principal Investigator on the High Productivity Computing Systems (HPCS) program sponsored by the Defense Advanced Research Projects Agency (DARPA) and Sun. When Oracle Corporation acquired Sun Microsystems in 2010, he was appointed Vice President of Photonics, Interconnects, and Packaging at Oracle Labs. On March 1, 2014, Mitchell retired from Oracle Labs. In 2013, he joined the board of directors of the Curci Foundation, which funds research in the life sciences. As of December 2021, he remains on the board, and is Science Advisory Board Chairperson.

== Honors ==
In 1997, he was awarded the J. W. Graham Medal in Computing and Innovation from the University of Waterloo.

In 2008, he was awarded the Fr. Norm Choate, CR, Distinguished Alumni Award from St. Jerome's University.

== See also ==
- Acorn Computers
- Java (programming language)
- List of University of Waterloo people
- Mesa (programming language)
- Olivetti
- Oracle Corporation
- Sun Fellow
- Sun Microsystems
- Xerox PARC
