= Watcom =

Software company

Watcom International Corporation
- Industry: Computer software
- Founded: Waterloo, Ontario (1981)
- Headquarters: Waterloo, Ontario
- Key people: Wes Graham, Ian McPhee, Fred Crigger, Jack Schueler
- Products: Watcom C/C++ compiler, Watcom SQL, VX-REXX
- Website: www.openwatcom.com

Watcom International Corporation was a software company, which was founded in 1981 by Wes Graham and Ian McPhee. Founding staff (Fred Crigger, Jack Schueler and McPhee) were formerly members of Professor Graham's Computer Systems Group at the University of Waterloo, in Waterloo, Ontario, Canada. Watcom produced a variety of tools, including the well-known Watcom C/C++ compiler introduced in 1988.

The first company started by Graham and McPhee was Structured Computing Systems, incorporated in 1974. Then the software development company, WATCOM Systems Inc, started in 1981 with three full-time employees, but had been incorporated two years earlier as Waterloo Basic Enterprises Limited. In 1984, the various subsidiary companies of The WATCOM Group software organization—marketing and sales, publications, seminars and systems (software development) -- were all renamed as WATCOM companies for consistent branding. These were later all merged into one full-service software company, WATCOM International Inc.

== History ==
Waterloo BASIC programming language was one of the earliest Watcom products and predates the existence of the company. During 1978 to 1979 Waterloo BASIC was developed targeting the IBM Series/1. In 1979 the system was ported to VM/CMS running on the IBM 370, 3030, and 4300 computers and an agreement was reached with IBM to market the compiler. Between 1980 and 1983 updated versions were released including ports to the MVS/TSO and VM/CMS. In addition to Waterloo BASIC some of the other early products included WATCOM APL, WATCOM GKS, WATCOM COBOL, WATCOM FORTRAN (WATFIV and WATFOR-77), WATCOM Pascal and the Waterloo 6809 Assembler. These were the basis and provided with the Commodore SuperPET.

In the mid 1980s Watcom developed compilers for the Unisys ICON computers running the QNX operating system. The Watcom C/C++ compiler with QNX developed a market for embedded applications.

In 1984, Maple 3.2 was ported to IBM VM/CMS.

In 1988, Watcom released their first C compiler for the IBM PC platform (and compatibles). It was released with a version number of 6 at a time when the latest version numbers of Borland's and Microsoft's C Compilers were version 5. These version numbers signified nothing and were used for marketing purposes. The compiler could create tighter and faster code than its competition.

In 1992, Watcom began a move into the client-server arena with the introduction of Watcom SQL, a SQL database server product. Being a very small company (about 8 developers) they managed to produce high quality software, famous among software developers. Watcom SQL is still in production, now under the name SAP SQL Anywhere.

In 1993, the VX-REXX system was released.

Watcom was acquired by Powersoft in 1994, and Powersoft merged with Sybase in 1995. In May 2000, Sybase spun off their mobile and embedded computing division into its own company, Sybase iAnywhere (formerly iAnywhere Solutions Inc.). Sybase tried to re-target the Watcom compiler into a visual RAD tool, Optima++, but in 2003, because the product competed directly with the Sybase offering PowerBuilder, the product was discontinued. Its sister product, Optima-J, was continued. In 2003, the Watcom C/C++ and Fortran compilers were released as an open source project under a new name, Open Watcom.

== Users and reception ==
Doom, Descent, Magic Carpet, Grand Theft Auto, System Shock, Fast Attack, Atomic Bomberman, Duke Nukem 3D and Fallout are among well known games that were compiled with Watcom C and DOS/4GW. As well as Command & Conquer Red Alert.

Novell's Netware386 and Fox Software's FoxPro 2 were compiled with Watcom C/C++.

== See also ==
- Sybase
