= Mitchell Kertzman =

American venture capitalist

Mitchell E. Kertzmann
- Born: c. 1949
- Education: Brandeis University
- Occupations: Venture capitalist, businessman
- Employer: Hummer Winblad Venture Partners

Mitchell E. Kertzman (born c. 1949) is an American venture capitalist with Hummer Winblad Venture Partners. He is the former CEO of Sybase, Powersoft, and Liberate Technologies.

== Early life and education ==
Kertzman grew up in the Brighton neighborhood of Boston. (His mother was Miriam Kertzman; she created the first corporate daycare center for American industry and ran it from 1971 to her death c. August 30, 1985.) He dropped out of Brandeis University in 1968, then pursued a career as a disk jockey (but was fired after only four months on the job). He then learned computer programming, and in 1974 founded the company that later became Powersoft as a one-person contract programming business.

== Career ==
During the 1992 Paul Tsongas presidential campaign, Kertzman advised Paul Tsongas; in fact, Tsongas chose Kertzman to introduce him when he introduced his candidacy in April 1991.

Kertzman sold Powersoft to Sybase in 1994 for $904 million. After Sybase purchased Powersoft in 1995, Kertzman became CEO and president of Sybase, but left after three years to become the president and CEO of Network Computer Incorporated, a company spun out of Oracle Corporation. During Kertzman's tenure, Network Computer Incorporated refocused its business from network computer hardware to interactive television, and changed its name to Liberate Technologies.

In 1998, Kertzman testified against Microsoft before the United States Senate Committee on the Judiciary about an incident where Microsoft advised him not to develop a competing product during an investigation into whether Microsoft was abusing monopoly power.

In 2003, David Lockwood replaced Kertzman as CEO of Liberate Technologies, and Kertzman joined Hummer Winblad Venture Partners, where as of 2014 he is "Managing Director".

== Personal life ==
Kertzman described himself as "socially liberal, fiscally conservative" but not wanting to run for public office. Kertzman is also "an admitted couch potato". During a jam session in an industry meeting, Kertzman gave a rendition of a song entitled "Wild Thing".
