= University of Waterloo Faculty of Mathematics =

Academic division of the University of Waterloo

Coordinates: 43.4721°N 80.5439°W

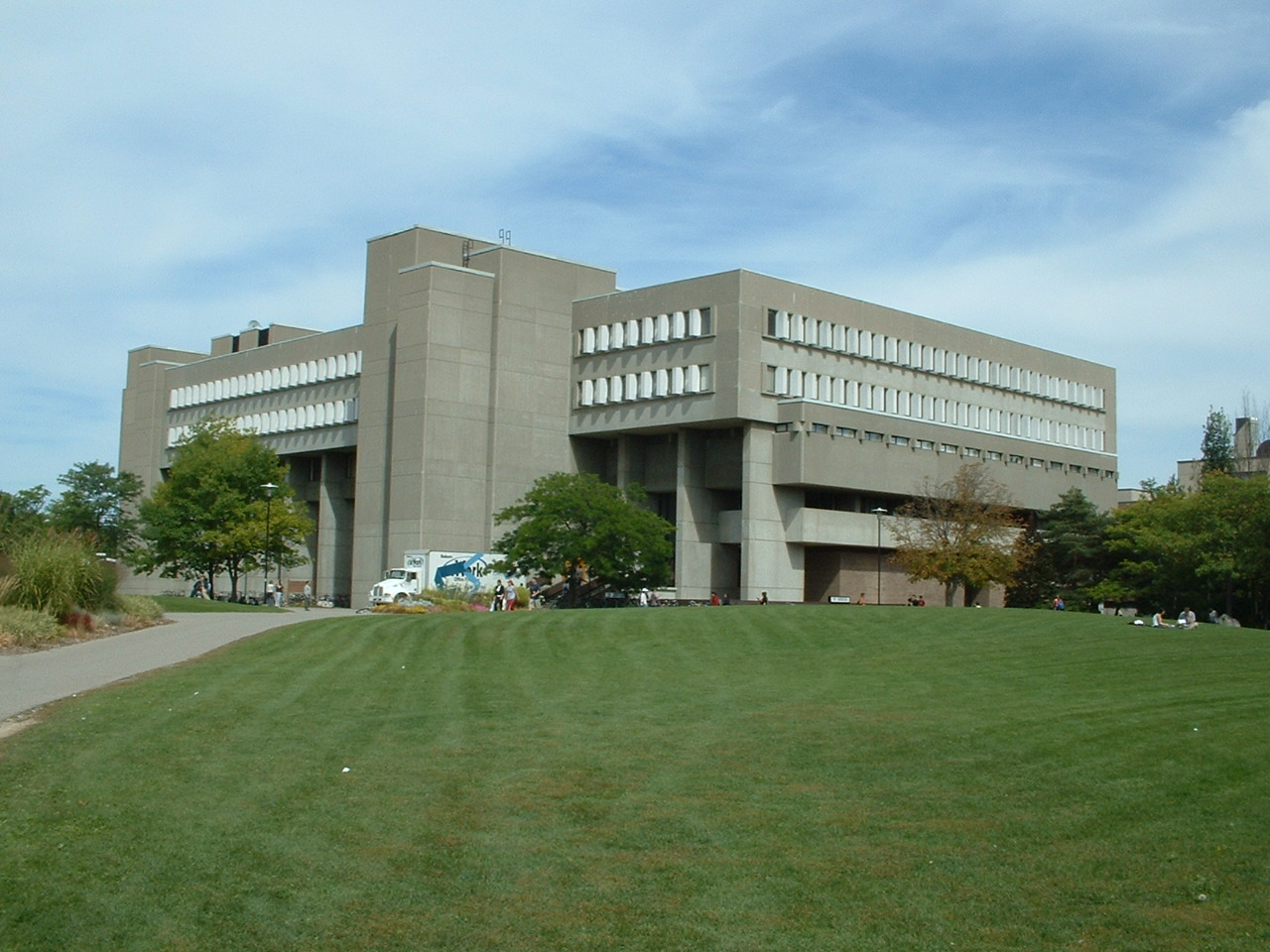
- Mathematics and Computer Building
- Type: Public
- Established: January 1, 1967
- Parent institution: University of Waterloo
- Dean: Jochen Koenemann
- Undergraduates: 6,936
- Postgraduates: 420
- Doctoral students: 337
- Location: Waterloo, Ontario, Canada
- Symbol: Pink tie
- Colours: Pink
- Website: uwaterloo.ca/math

The University of Waterloo Faculty of Mathematics is one of six faculties of the University of Waterloo in Waterloo, Ontario, offering more than 500 courses in mathematics, statistics and computer science. The faculty also houses the David R. Cheriton School of Computer Science, formerly the faculty's computer science department. There are more than 31,000 alumni.

== History ==
The faculty was founded on January 1, 1967, a successor to the University of Waterloo's Department of Mathematics, which had grown to be the largest department in the Faculty of Arts under the chairmanship of Ralph Stanton (and included such influential professors as W. T. Tutte). Initially located in the Physics building, the faculty was moved in May 1968 into the newly constructed Mathematics and Computing (MC) Building. Inspired by Stanton's famously gaudy ties, the students draped a large pink tie over the MC Building on the occasion of its opening, which later became a symbol of the faculty.

At the time of its founding, the faculty included five departments: Applied Analysis and Computer Science, Applied Mathematics, Combinatorics and Optimization, Pure Mathematics, and Statistics. In 1975 the Department of Applied Analysis and Computer Science became simply the Department of Computer Science; in 2005 it became the David R. Cheriton School of Computer Science. The Statistics Department also was later renamed the Department of Statistics and Actuarial Science. The Department of Combinatorics and Optimization is the only academic department in the world devoted to combinatorics.

The second building occupied by the Mathematics faculty was the Davis Centre, which was completed in 1988. This building includes a plethora of offices, along with various lecture halls and meeting rooms. (The Davis Centre is also home to the library originally known as the Engineering, Math, and Science [EMS] Library, which was originally housed on the fourth floor of the MC building.)

The Faculty of Mathematics finished construction of a third building, Mathematics 3 (M3), in 2011. This building now houses the Department of Statistics and Actuarial Science and a large lecture hall. An additional building, M4, is currently under construction.

== Academics ==
=== Degrees ===
The Faculty of Mathematics grants the BMath (Bachelor of Mathematics) degree for most of its undergraduate programs. Computer Science undergraduates can generally choose between graduating with a BMath or a BCS (Bachelor of Computer Science) degree. The former requires more coursework in mathematics. Specialized degrees exist for the Software Engineering program (the BSE, or Bachelor of Software Engineering) and Computing and Financial Management (BCFM, or Bachelor of Computing and Financial Management). Postgraduate students are generally awarded an MMath (Master of Mathematics) or PhD.

=== Rankings ===
In the 2025 QS World University Rankings, the University of Waterloo was ranked 39th globally for Mathematics (and 3rd in Canada) and 21st globally for Computer Science (and 2nd in Canada). The University was ranked third in Canada for Mathematics and second in Canada for Computer Science in 2018 by the Maclean's University Rankings.

== Student life ==
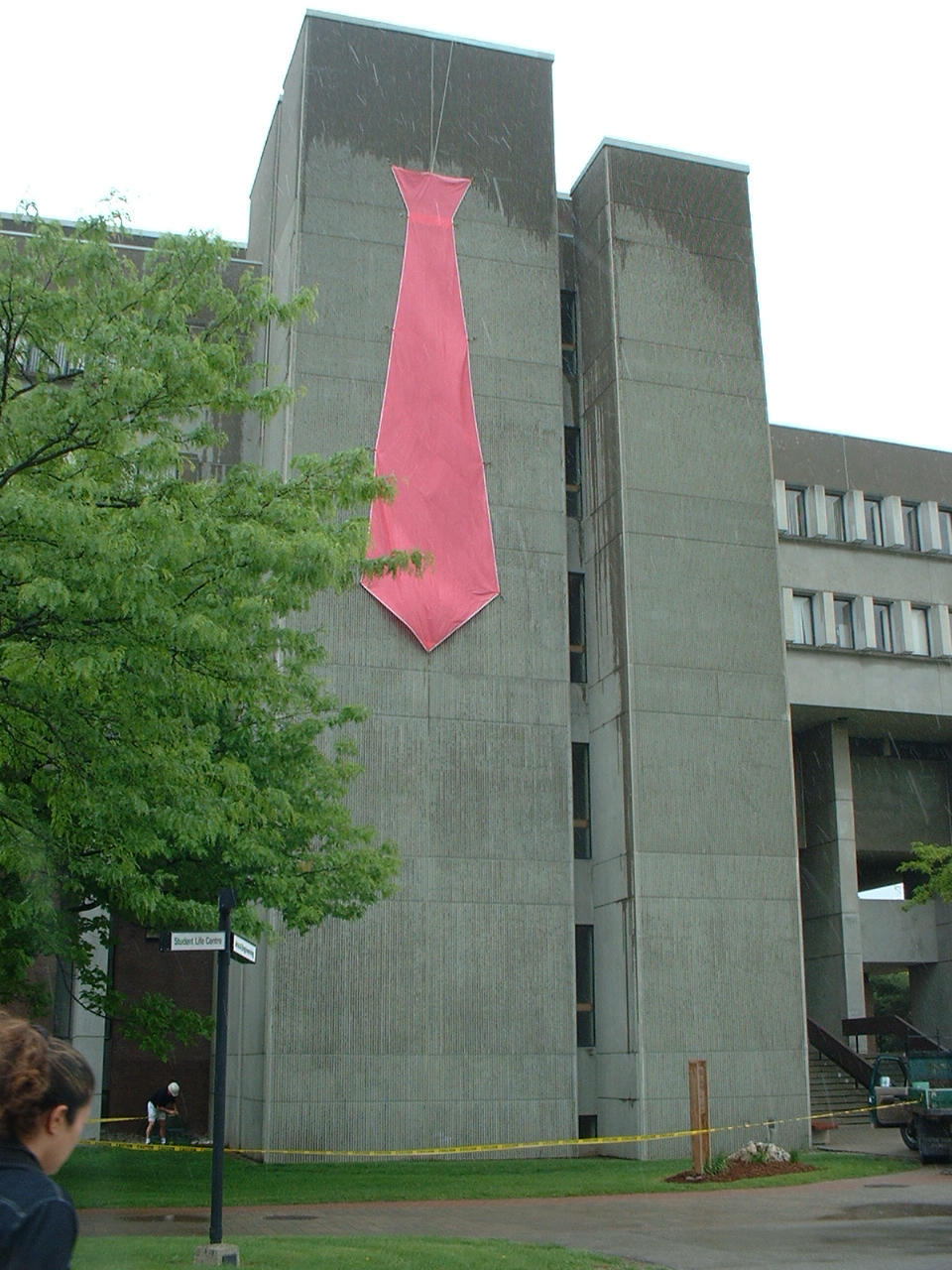
The Pink Tie

Students in the Faculty of Mathematics are represented by the Mathematics Society (MathSoc), which represents student interests to the university, operates the Math Coffee and Donut Shop, publishes the faculty newspaper mathNEWS, and runs student services including an exam bank and lounge space.

Pi Day is celebrated by the department in each term: on 14 March (3/14), on 22 July (22/7, Pi Approximation Day), and on 10 November (the 314th day of the year). Typical activities include throwing pie at MathSoc executives and/or popular professors, viewing mathematics-related films, competing in pi recitation contests, and eating pie (on 22/7, cake is served instead, which is approximately pie).

=== Tie Guard ===
A yearly tradition at the University of Waterloo, a group of senior math students volunteer for the position of Tie Guard each year, and are selected by the University of Waterloo Federation of Students representatives from the Faculty of Mathematics. It is expected that the appointed Tie Guard volunteers will be on hand 24 hours a day for the duration of the orientation week, to guard the Faculty's mascot (a 40-foot pink tie which hangs off the side of the building) and to provide first aid and information to incoming students.

The Tie Guard was founded in 1994 after several previous attempts on the Pink Tie resulted in both damaged mascots and injuries to students, the most notorious of which was the Tie Liberation Organization (TLO) kidnapping in 1988. In more recent years the tie guard has expanded and now several students are appointed to the Tie Guard each year. A new pink tie was draped over the Mathematics 3 Building in 2011.

== Notable members ==
- Mark Giesbrecht, dean, 2020–25
- George Alfred Barnard, lecturer
- Walter Benz, professor
- Jonathan Borwein OC FRSC, researcher (1991–93)
- Timothy Chan, professor
- C. B. Collins, professor
- Gordon Cormack
- Paul Cress, lecturer
- Kenneth Davidson FRSC, professor
- Jack Edmonds, professor
- Keith Geddes, professor
- Ian Goldberg, assistant professor
- Ian Goulden FRSC, professor
- Peter Ladislaw Hammer, professor
- Hiroshi Haruki, professor (1966–86)
- Ric Holt, professor
- David Jackson FRSC, professor
- Srinivasan Keshav, associate professor; Sloan Fellowship (1997–99)
- Murray Klamkin, professor
- Neal Koblitz, professor
- Kenneth Mackenzie, professor
- Alfred Menezes, professor
- Crispin Nash-Williams, professor
- Josef Paldus FRSC, professor (1968–2001)
- Vladimir Platonov, professor (1993–2001); Humboldt Prize (1993)
- Ronald Read, professor
- Jeffrey Shallit, professor
- Doug Stinson, professor
- W. T. Tutte OC FRS FRSC, professor (1962–85); CRM-Fields-PIMS Prize (2001)
- Scott Vanstone FRSC, professor
