= Build-A-Bird =

1986 educational software

- Developers: Ergonomics Lab, University of Toronto
- Release: 1986; 40 years ago
- Available in: English
- Type: Educational Software

Build-A-Bird (1986 or earlier) was educational software for the Unisys ICON II public school computer.

== Overview ==
Build-A-Bird was designed and developed by Ergonomics Lab, University of Toronto. Gameplay revolved around creating a bird by choosing from a selection of different body parts such as stork-like legs, short legs adapted to alighting on various natural surfaces, or predatory talons. Beak type and wing type were also among the changeable body part selections in Build-A-Bird. Upon selecting your preferred, various body part types the game would provide one or several real life birds that fit your selections. What happened next in the game involved educational material about your bird's range and habitat. The visual representations of the birds, their body parts and the bird habitats were in colour and vivid for the time but lacked animation.
