= Paul van Oorschot =

Cryptographer

Paul C. van Oorschot is a cryptographer and computer security researcher, currently a professor of computer science at Carleton University in Ottawa, Ontario, where he held a Canada Research Chair in authentication and computer security over the period 2002-2023. He is a Fellow of the Royal Society of Canada (FRSC). He is best known as a co-author of the Handbook of Applied Cryptography (ISBN 0-8493-8523-7), together with Alfred Menezes and Scott Vanstone. He is also the author of Computer Security and the Internet: Tools and Jewels from Malware to Bitcoin (ISBN 978-3-030-83410-4). Van Oorschot was awarded the 2000 J.W. Graham Medal in Computing Innovation. He also helped organize the first Selected Areas in Cryptography (SAC) workshop in 1994.

Van Oorschot received his Ph.D. in 1988 from the University of Waterloo. He was recognized (2016) as a Fellow of the Association for Computing Machinery for "contributions to applied cryptography, authentication and computer security." He is also a Fellow of the IEEE (2019). His most recent book is Computer Security and the Internet: Tools and Jewels from Malware to Bitcoin (2nd edition, 2021; Springer International).

== See also ==
- List of University of Waterloo people
