= Watcom C/C++ =

Commercial product for developing code

Open Watcom C/C++

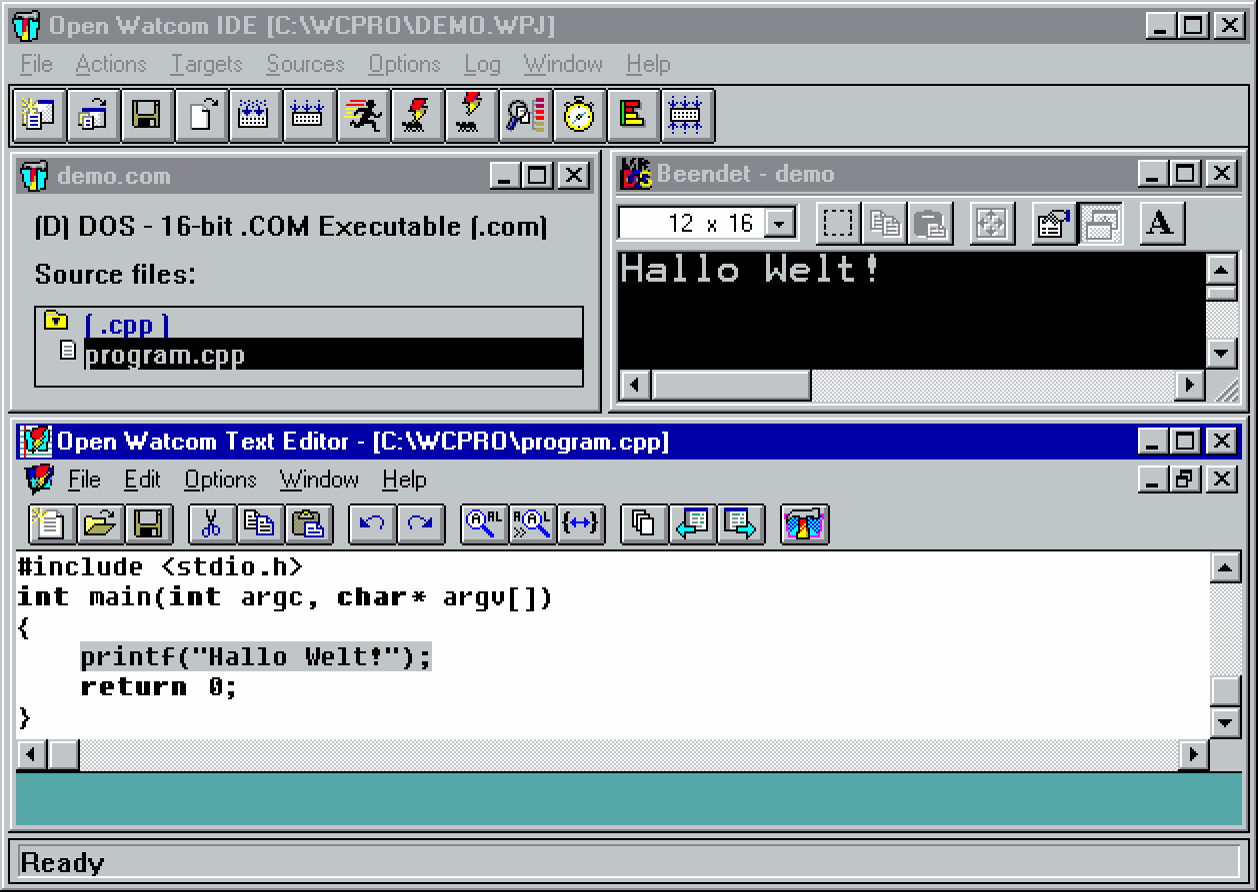
- Open Watcom IDE
- Original author: Watcom
- Developers: Sybase, SciTech Software
- Release: 1988; 38 years ago
- Stable release: 2.0 (continuous updates) / December 4, 2024; 22 months ago
- Written in: C, C++
- Operating system: DOS, Windows, OS/2, Linux
- Platform: x86, IA-32, x86-64
- Size: 66–84 MB
- Type: Integrated development environment
- License: Sybase Open Watcom Public License version 1.0
- Website: openwatcom.org open-watcom.github.io
- Repository: github.com/open-watcom/open-watcom-v2

Watcom C/C++ (currently Open Watcom C/C++) is an integrated development environment (IDE) product from Watcom International Corporation for the C, C++, and Fortran programming languages. Watcom C/C++ was a commercial product until it was discontinued, then released under the Sybase Open Watcom Public License as Open Watcom C/C++. It features tools for developing and debugging code for DOS, OS/2, Windows, and Linux operating systems, which are based upon 16-bit x86, 32-bit IA-32, or 64-bit x86-64 compatible processors.

== History ==
In 2000, Sybase, who owned Watcom International Corporation halted the commercial sale of the Watcom C/C++ and Fortran compilers. In 2003, SciTech Software Inc, a customer of Sybase, negotiated wth Sybase, to have the code for the compilers released as an open source project under a new name, Open Watcom. The Watcom C/C++ compiler and the Watcom Fortran compiler were made available free of charge as the Open Watcom package.

The last stable version endorsed by the original openwatcom.org team was 1.9, released in June 2010.

A community-based forked version 2.0 (with continuous updates under the same version moniker) was released after the original codebase was seemingly no longer developed by the original team. It includes miscellaneous bugfixes, supports 64-bit hosts (Windows and Linux), built-in text editor, 2-phase build system, and has a DOS version that supports long filenames (LFN).

=== Release history ===
The Open Watcom Wiki has a comprehensive history.

Release history table

Date	Product	Notes
1984	Waterloo C for S/370	
1985		Work on current code generator codebase started
1988	Watcom C 6.0	DOS host and target only; Included a debugger and full set of runtime libraries; Generated better code than other compilers at the time; Watcom C Version 6.5 contained Graphics Library similar to Microsoft Graphics Library; Real mode support only
1989	Watcom C 7.0	
1989	Watcom C 7.0/386	First 32-bit version, DOS host and target only; Supported Phar Lap DOS extender; Did not come with a linker or debugger
1990	Watcom C 8.0	
1990	Watcom C 8.0/386	Added linker, librarian, debugger, and profiler
1991	Watcom C 8.5	
1991	Watcom C 8.5/386	Shipped with DOS/4GW; Windows 3.0 supported (Win386 extender); Unicode support; OS/2 hosted executables added
1992	Watcom C 9.0	
1992	Watcom C 9.0/386	OS/2 2.0 host and target support; 486 optimizations; Based pointer support
	Watcom C 9.01/386	Windows 3.1 support
1993	Watcom C/C++ 9.5	
1993	Watcom C/C++ 9.5/386	C++ compiler added; Pentium optimizations; Windows NT host and target support
1994	Watcom C/C++ 10.0	MFC included; Precompiled header support; 16-bit and 32-bit tools merged into single package; Redesigned debugger; C++ class browser added; Windows resource editors added; Graphical IDE for Windows and OS/2
1995	Watcom C/C++ 10.5	Native C++ exception handling on OS/2 and Win32; Windows 95 and NT 3.5 support; TCP/IP remote debugging
1996	Watcom C/C++ 10.6	Structured exception handling in C; Improved compatibility with Microsoft compilers
1997 Q1	Watcom C/C++ 11.0	Namespace, RTTI, and new style cast support in C++ compiler; 64-bit integer support; Multi-byte character support in libraries; Incremental linking support; COFF and ELF object file support in linker and librarian; Microsoft clone tools added; DLL based tools for better IDE integration; MMX support, including debugging; Pentium Pro optimizations, including branch prediction; Novell NLM support
1998	Watcom C/C++ 11.0B	
1999-06-30		Sybase issues end-of-life notice for Watcom C/C++ 11.0
2000-08-22		Sybase announces open sourcing of Watcom tools
2001-09-27	Watcom C/C++ 11.0c Beta	
2002-12-21	Watcom C/C++ 11.0c	
2003-01-28	Open Watcom 1.0	
2003-08-12	Open Watcom 1.1	
2004-01-07	Open Watcom 1.2	
2004-08-03	Open Watcom 1.3	
2005-12-14	Open Watcom 1.4	
2006-04-26	Open Watcom 1.5	
2006-12-15	Open Watcom 1.6	
2007-08-18	Open Watcom 1.7	
2007-10-23	Open Watcom 1.7a	
2009-02-21	Open Watcom 1.8	
2010-06-02	Open Watcom 1.9	Last version released via https://www.openwatcom.org
initial release: 2015-04-02 (continuous updates later on, up until at least 2025)	Open Watcom v2 rolling	GitHub v2 fork, numerous fixes; Open Watcom ported to 64-bit hosts (Windows and Linux); Resource compiler and Resource editor support WIN64 executables; built-in text editor; two-phase build system; DOS version of tools support long filenames (LFN); add check box for C99 in the "2. Diagnostics Switches" panel of the GUI

== License ==
The Open Source Initiative has approved the license as open source, but Debian, Fedora and the Free Software Foundation have rejected it because "It requires you to publish the source code publicly whenever you “Deploy” the covered software, and “Deploy” is defined to include many kinds of private use."

== Design ==
The compiler can be operated from, and generate executable code for, the DOS, OS/2, Windows, Linux operating systems. It also supports NLM targets for Novell NetWare. There is ongoing work to extend the targeting to Linux and modern BSD (e.g., FreeBSD) operating systems, running on x86, PowerPC, and other processors.

The code is portable and, like many other open source compiler projects such as GCC or LCC the compiler backend (code generator) is retargetable.

== Uses ==
In the mid-1990s some of the most technically ambitious DOS computer games such as Doom, Descent, Duke Nukem 3D, Rise of the Triad, and Tomb Raider were built using Watcom C/C++ using the DOS/4GW protected mode extender with the Watcom compiler.

It was used to port the game Retro City Rampage to DOS in 2015.

It was used by VirtualBox to compile the BIOS.

Current development for FreeDOS requires that all C source code must be compilable by Open Watcom C.

Open Watcom is the recommended compiler for application and driver development for the OS/2-based ArcaOS operating system.

The Embeddable Linux Kernel Subset also supports using Open Watcom C.

== Compatibility ==
Open Watcom's syntax supports many conventions introduced by other compilers, such as Microsoft's and Borland's, including differing conventions regarding (for instance) the number of leading underscores on the "asm" tag. Code written specifically for another compiler rather than standard-compliant C or C++ will often compile with the Watcom compiler.

The C compiler supports ANSI C (C89, C90, ISO C) standard by default.

Open Watcom supports partial compatibility with the C99 standard. It implements the most commonly used parts of the standard, including inline variable declaration. However, they are enabled only through the undocumented command-line switch "-za99" (which needs to be added to the "Other options" field in "4. Miscellaneous Switches" panel in the GUI). In a more recent version of Open Watcom 2.0, a check box was added for C99 in the "2. Diagnostics Switches" panel in the GUI. Three C99 features have been bundled as C90 Extension since pre-v1.0: C++ style comments (//), flexible array members, trailing comma allowed in enum declaration.

The compiler currently doesn't support any new major C11 features, though the C library does include "Safe C" functions. It is specified in ISO/IEC TR 24731-1 and known as "Bounds-checking interfaces (Annex K)" in C11. Some function name examples are strcpy_s(), memcpy_s(), printf_s(). This library was released along with Open Watcom 1.5 in April 2006.

== Reception ==
In a February 1989 overview of optimizing C compilers, BYTE praised Watcom C 6.5's "unmatched execution speed" and noted that it was the most ANSI C-compliant. The magazine advised, "If speed is absolutely critical and OS/2 compatibility isn't, choose Watcom".

== See also ==
- Open Watcom Assembler
