= WATBOL =

Teaching compiler for COBOL

WATBOL is a teaching compiler for the COBOL programming language developed in 1969 at the University of Waterloo. The compiler was a companion product, built under the design philosophy, of Waterloo's earlier, widely used WATFOR teaching compiler. Since programs written by undergraduate students were unlikely to be run more than a few times, after they were successfully written and debugged, the efficiency of the program, once compiled was of secondary importance, compared with giving simpler, clearer error messages, and in simplifying the steps for the student to compile the program. At that time executing a program through the use of commercial compiler was a three-step process. First the Fortran, or COBOL, had to be compiled into assembly language, then the assembly language had to be assembled into binary code; finally the compiled and assembled code had to be linked with previously written libraries of subroutines. WATFOR and WATBOL allowed simple programs to be compiled, linked, and executed in a single step.

In 1982 Carol Vogt wrote that 230 other institutions were using WATBOL.
