= Wes Graham =

Canadian computer scientist and professor

James Wesley Graham
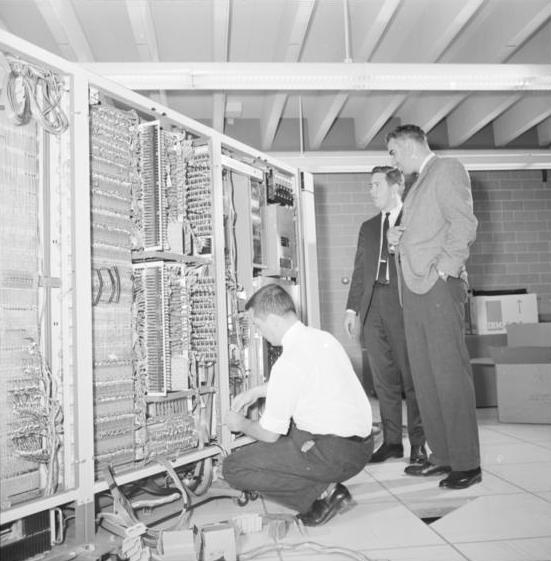
- Graham (right) supervising set up of IBM computer at the University of Waterloo in 1964.
- Born: January 17, 1932; Copper Cliff, Ontario
- Died: August 20, 1999 (aged 67); Waterloo, Ontario
- Other names: Wes Graham
- Occupation: Professor of Computer Science
- Known for: led teams that developed influential software projects

James Wesley Graham, OC was a Canadian professor of computer science at the University of Waterloo.

Graham was born on January 17, 1932, in Copper Cliff, Ontario. His interest in computing developed while studying math and physics at the University of Toronto. After working at IBM as a systems engineer, Graham accepted a position at the University of Waterloo in 1959 becoming one of the first computer science professors at the university. In 1962, Graham was named the director of Waterloo's Computing Centre when it was established as a separate entity from Department of Mathematics.

In 1965, Waterloo undergraduate James G. Mitchell wrote a paper on how to create a teaching compiler for Fortran. Graham created a team for Mitchell to create the compiler, which was eventually known as WATFOR, and was eventually to be used by students at 420 postsecondary institutions around the world. WATFOR was followed by similar teaching compilers, like WATBOL, for teaching COBOL, and WATIAC for teaching the principles of assembly language programming.

Graham is credited with convincing leading computer manufacturers to donate equipment to Waterloo. A total of $35 million CAD in donated equipment is credited to Graham's efforts.

Graham, some of his colleagues, and students and former students of theirs, formed the University spin-off software company Watcom, which was sold to Powersoft in 1994, for $100 million CAD. Powersoft was then acquired by Sybase in 1994 which was subsequently acquired by SAP SE in 2010.

Graham was named an Officer of the Order of Canada, in July 1999, but died of cancer before the formal award ceremony in September 1999. The J.W. Graham Medal for excellence in Computer Science was named in his honor.
