= Powersoft =

Italian audio equipment manufacturer based in Florence

Powersoft S.p.A.
- Company type: Public (S.p.A.)
- Industry: Electronics
- Founded: 1995; 30 years ago in Florence, Italy
- Founders: Luca Lastrucci; Claudio Lastrucci; Antonio Peruch
- Headquarters: Scandicci, Florence, Italy
- Area served: Worldwide
- Key people: Carlo Lastrucci; Luca Lastrucci; Claudio Lastrucci; Antonio Peruch; Luca Giorgi; Antonella Diana; Lorenzo Lepri
- Products: Amplifiers
- Website: www.powersoft.com

Powersoft S.p.A. is a worldwide company, headquartered in Scandicci, Florence, Italy, that specialises in design, production and marketing of high-end patented technologies for professional audio market.

== History ==
=== Founding ===
Powersoft was founded in 1995 in Florence, when Luca Lastrucci, Claudio Lastrucci and their childhood friend Antonio Peruch developed the company’s first project: a new, class-D amplifier that was able to reliably deliver high power levels.

=== Developments ===
During the COVID-19 pandemic, Powersoft pledged to donate a percentage of the proceeds from all of the touring amplifier platforms sold between 27th July and 15th October 2020 to assist touring and venue crews affected the pandemic.

In 2022, the company expanded its offices in the U.S. An expansion in China followed in 2023, and Japan later that year. In 2024, Powersoft announced it would open a new headquarters in Florence.

In 2023, it announced partnerships with Vega Global, STS and Strong/MDI. They also launched an amplifier with Bose and a technology partnership with Ferrari.

In 2025, the company won the InAVation Award Audio Technology – Unica. The same year, it acquired a majority stake in Italian loudspeaker manufacturer K-array.

Powersoft powers the immersive audio at the Las Vegas Sphere.

== See also ==
- List of companies of Italy
