= List of University of Waterloo people =

The University of Waterloo, located in Waterloo, Ontario, Canada, is a comprehensive public university that was founded in 1957 by Drs. Gerry Hagey and Ira G. Needles. It has grown into an institution of more than 42,000 students, faculty, and staff. The school is notable for being the first accredited university in North America to create a Faculty of Mathematics, which is now the world's largest, and for having the largest cooperative education program in the world. The school is also known for having more companies formed by its faculty, students, and alumni than any other Canadian university, and as such, it has been called the "MIT of the North".

The list includes notable faculty, alumni, staff, and former university presidents. The enrollment for 2020 was 36,057 undergraduate and 6,231 graduate students, with 1,350 faculty members and 2,596 staff. About 221,000 people have graduated from the university, and now reside in over 150 countries.

== Alumni and faculty ==
Fields with a "—" have unknown values.

=== Alumni ===
Name	Degree	Discipline	Known for	Notes
V. K. Aatre	Graduate	Electrical engineering	Scientist and former head of the Defence Research and Development Organisation	
Daniel Tyrie	Graduate	Political Science and Economics	Former Executive Director of the People's Party of Canada, co-founder and chairman of the Dominion Society of Canada	
Michael H. Albert	Undergraduate	Mathematics	Rhodes Scholar, professor at University of Otago	
Celeste Anderson	Undergraduate	Computer Science	King of the Nerds winner, competitive gamer	
Gordon Stewart Anderson	Undergraduate	—	Writer	
Mohammad H. Ansari	Graduate	Physics	Fundamental quantum theory research	
Andy Anstett	Graduate	Politics	Ministry of Municipal Affairs	
Paul Antrobus	Graduate	Psychology	Principal at Baptist Theological Seminary, Kakinada (India) and psychology professor at University of Regina, Regina, Saskatchewan (Canada)	
Omer Arbel	Undergraduate	Environmental studies	Designer, sculptor, creative director of Bocci	
Karen Autio	Undergraduate	Mathematics and computer science	Writer of children's fiction	
Calvin Ayre	Undergraduate	Science and Business	Bodog founder	
Ricardo Baeza-Yates	Graduate	Computer science	Director of Yahoo! Research labs	
Bill Ballinger	Undergraduate	Political science	Member of the Legislative Assembly of Ontario	
Lisa Feldman Barrett	Graduate	Psychology	Northeastern University professor	
Romesh Batra	Graduate	Mechanical engineering	Virginia Polytechnic Institute and State University professor	
Keith Beavers	Undergraduate	Kinesiology	Competed in swimming at the 2004 Summer Olympics	
Gordon Bell	Undergraduate	Computer science	QNX co-creator	
David Berman	Undergraduate	Computer science	Fellow of the Society of Graphic Designers of Canada	
Peter Besler	Undergraduate	Chemistry	Investment banker	
Art Binkowski	Undergraduate	Psychology	Heavyweight boxer	
Don Boudria	Undergraduate	Politics	Canadian Member of Parliament and cabinet minister	
Marie Bountrogianni	Undergraduate	Arts	Member of Ontario Parliament, minister of intergovernmental affairs, and dean of the G. Raymond Chang School of Continuing Education at Ryerson University	
Mark Bourrie	Undergraduate	History	Lawyer, author, and winner of the RBC Taylor Prize for literary non-fiction	
Gail Bowen	Graduate	English	Playwright and writer of mystery novels	
Brad Bradford	Graduate	Planning	Toronto city councillor	
Mike Bradley	Undergraduate	Athletics	Canadian Football League running back	
Peter Braid	Undergraduate	International relations	Member of Parliament	
Andrew Brandt	Undergraduate	Business	Former Canadian cabinet minister	
Fiona Brinkman	Undergraduate	Biochemistry	Associate professor at Simon Fraser University	
Alison Brooks	Undergraduate	Architecture	Stirling Prize Award-winning Architect	
Edward Burger	Graduate	Mathematics	Professor at Williams College	
Amanda Burk	Undergraduate	Fine Arts	Artist, associate professor at Nipissing University	
Vitalik Buterin	Dropout	Computer science	Co-founder of Ethereum, co-founder of Bitcoin Magazine	
Wayne Cao	Undergraduate	Computer science	Member of the Legislative Assembly of Alberta	
Colin Carrie	Undergraduate	Politics	Member of Parliament	
Jeromy Carriere	Undergraduate	Computer science	Computer architect	
Bardish Chagger	Undergraduate	Science	Member of Parliament	
David Cheriton	Graduate	Mathematics	Stanford University professor and Granite Systems co-founder	
Václav Chvátal	Graduate	Mathematics	Canada Research Chair in Combinatorial Optimization and former professor at McGill and Stanford	
Ian Clark	Graduate	Earth science	Professor in the Department of Earth Sciences at the University of Ottawa	
George Elliott Clarke	Undergraduate	Entertainment	Poet and playwright; Governor General's Award for poetry recipient	
Rod Coutts	Undergraduate	Electrical Engineering	Founder of Teklogix; namesake of the Rod Coutts Engineering Lecture Building at University of Waterloo	
Clifford Cunningham	Undergraduate	Physics & Classical studies	Astronomer	
Julie E. Czerneda	Undergraduate	Literature	Science fiction and fantasy author	
Heather Dale	Undergraduate	Entertainment	Celtic singer	
Liane Davey	Graduate	Industrial/Organizational Psychology	Leadership consultant, public speaker, and New York Times bestselling author	
Erik Demaine	Graduate	Computer science	Youngest professor ever at MIT	
Dan Dodge	Undergraduate	Computer science	QNX co-creator	
Andrew Drummond	Undergraduate	Arts	Frances Hodgkins Fellow	
Richard Ducharme	Undergraduate	Civil engineering	General manager of transportation for Edmonton	
Tom Duff	Undergraduate	Computer science	Computer scientist	
Garfield Dunlop	Undergraduate	Politics	Member of the Legislative Assembly of Ontario	
David Eby	Undergraduate	English	Premier of British Columbia	
Fred Eisenberger	Undergraduate	—	Politician	
Jon Evans	Undergraduate	Engineering	Arthur Ellis Awards winner	
Anne Fleming	Undergraduate	English	Fiction writer	
Joe Fontana	Undergraduate	Chemistry	Member of Parliament	
Godwin Friday	Graduate	History	Prime minister of Saint Vincent and the Grenadines	
John Friedlander	Graduate	Mathematics	Fellow of the Royal Society of Canada and American Mathematical Society and winner of the CRM-Fields-PIMS prize	
Curwin Friesen	Undergraduate	Economics	Chief executive officer of Friesens	
James Alan Gardner	Graduate	Mathematics	Science fiction author	
J. Alan George	Graduate	Computer science	Dean of the University of Waterloo Faculty of Mathematics	
Garth A. Gibson	Undergraduate	Computer Science	Computer scientist at Carnegie Mellon University	
Brad Goddard	Undergraduate	Theatre	Actor	
W. G. Godfrey	Graduate	Canadian history	Canadian historian	
Gaston Gonnet	Graduate	Computer science	Computer scientist and entrepreneur	
Gary Goodyear	Undergraduate	Politics	Canadian member of Parliament	
Rick Green	Undergraduate	Entertainment	Comedian and member of The Frantics	
Chris Hadfield	Graduate	Mechanical engineering	Astronaut, commander of the International Space Station (2013)	
Fariborz Haghighat	Graduate	System Design Engineering	Professor at the Concordia University	
Ann Hansen	Undergraduate	—	Urban guerrilla	
Dianne Haskett	Undergraduate	Arts	Mayor of London, Ontario	
Deen Hergott	Undergraduate	—	Chess International Master	
Cyd Ho	Undergraduate	Politics	Member of the Legislative Council of Hong Kong	
Glenn Howard	Undergraduate	Environmental studies	Three-time World Curling Champion	
Kimmo Innanen	Graduate	Mathematics	Astronomer and professor	
Leslie John	Undergraduate	Psychology and Arts & Business	Author, behavioral scientist, professor at Harvard Business School	
David Johnson	Graduate	Mathematics	Mayor of East York, Ontario	
Rupi Kaur	Undergraduate	English	Poet, illustrator, and author; best known for her debut book, Milk and Honey	
Humayun Akhtar Khan	Undergraduate	Business mathematics	Commerce minister of Pakistan	
Arounna Khounnoraj	Graduate	Fine arts	Multi-disciplinary artist, teacher, author and co-founder of Bookhou	
Don Knight	Undergraduate	Accounting	Former member of the Legislative Assembly of Ontario	
Tony Knowles	Graduate	Physical chemistry	President of the British Columbia Institute of Technology	
Mike Lazaridis	Undergraduate	Electrical engineering	Research in Motion founder	
William Lawrence Kocay	Graduate	Mathematics	Professor of mathematics	
Serge LeClerc	Undergraduate	Sociology	Co-author of Untwisted	
William C. Leggett	Graduate	Zoology	Principal of Queen's University	
Rasmus Lerdorf	Undergraduate	Systems Design Engineering	PHP creator	
David X Li	Graduate	Actuarial science	Pioneer of Gaussian copula pricing models for collateralized debt obligations	
Michael Lysko		—	Former Canadian Football League commissioner	
Manas K. Mandal	Graduate	Biology	Director of the Defence Institute of Psychological Research	
Scott Manning	Undergraduate	—	Stunt pilot and CFL veteran	
Peter Masak	Undergraduate	Mechanical engineering	Glider pilot	
Ingrid Mattson	Undergraduate	—	Islamic Society of North America president	
Konris Maynard	Undergraduate	—	Winner of the Saint Kitts and Nevis National Calypso Show	
E. J. McGuire	Graduate	Psychology	Former director of the NHL Central Scouting Services	
David I. McKay	Undergraduate	Mathematics	Current president & CEO of Royal Bank of Canada	
Peter McLaren	Undergraduate	English literature	Critical pedagogy	
Nenad Medić	Undergraduate	—	Professional poker player	
Stella Meghie	Undergraduate	—	Film director and screenwriter	
James G. Mitchell	Undergraduate	Computer science	Computer scientist	
Parker Mitchell	Undergraduate	—	Engineers Without Borders co-founder	
Faron Moller	Graduate	Computer science	Computer scientist	
David Morrell	Undergraduate	Arts	Novelist of First Blood and the creator of the character John Rambo; the book was adapted into the 1982 film of the same name	
Michele Mosca	Undergraduate	Computer science	Co-founder of the IQC and the PITP	
Heather Moyse	Undergraduate	Kinesiology	Two-time Olympic gold medalist in bobsleigh; represented Canada's national rugby team at both the 2006 and 2010 Women's Rugby World Cup	
Walt Neubrand	Undergraduate	—	Keeper of the Stanley Cup	
Kevin O'Leary	Undergraduate	Environmental studies	Canadian businessman, author, politician, and television personality	
Paul van Oorschot	Graduate	Cryptography	Carleton University professor	
Chamath Palihapitiya	Undergraduate	Electrical engineering	Venture capitalist, engineer, SPAC sponsor, founder and CEO of Social Capital	
Steve Paul-Ambrose	Undergraduate	Science and Business	Poker player	
Cole Pearn	Graduate	Mechanical engineering	NASCAR crew chief	
Jean Poirier	Undergraduate	Environmental studies	Member of the Legislative Assembly of Ontario	
Karen Redman	Undergraduate	Politics	Canadian member of Parliament	
William Reeves	Undergraduate	Entertainment	Academy Award recipient for Toy Story	
John Reimer	Undergraduate	Education	Member of Parliament	
Neil Robertson	Graduate	Mathematics	Professor at the Ohio State University	
Robert Rosehart	Graduate	Engineering	President of Wilfrid Laurier University	
George Roter	Undergraduate	Engineering	Co-CEO of Engineers Without Borders (Canada)	
Bimal Kumar Roy	Graduate	Mathematics	Cryptologist	
Sandra Sabatini	Graduate	English literature	Writer	
Khaled Al Sabawi	Undergraduate	Computer science	Entrepreneur; named one of the "World's Top Energy Entrepreneurs" by Global Post in 2010	
Reihaneh Safavi-Naini	Graduate	Cryptography	University of Wollongong professor	
George Samis	Graduate	Political science	Member of the Legislative Assembly of Ontario	
Liz Sandals	Graduate	Mathematics	Member of Ontario Parliament	
Prem Saran Satsangi	Graduate	Electrical engineering	Spiritual leader of Radhasoami faith, Dayalbagh, chairman (ACE), Dayalbagh Educational Institute, ex-vice-chancellor of Dayalbagh Educational Institute, dean (academics) at IIT Delhi, system scientist, physicist	
Jonathan Schaeffer	Graduate	Researcher	Professor at the University of Alberta	
Beckie Scott	Undergraduate	English	Olympic gold medalist, first Canadian and first North American woman to win an Olympic medal in cross-country skiing; Officer of the Order of Canada and chair of the World Anti-Doping Agency	
Hersh Shefrin	Graduate	Mathematics	Behavioral finance	
Ron Sider	Undergraduate	Theology	Founder of Evangelicals for Social Action	
Bruce Smith	Undergraduate	Arts	Member of the Legislative Assembly of Ontario	
James K. A. Smith	Undergraduate	Philosophy	Associate professor of philosophy at Calvin College	
Steve Smith	Undergraduate	Entertainment	Actor in The Red Green Show	
Thomas Strothotte	Graduate	Computer science	Rector of the University of Rostock	
John Sullivan	Undergraduate	—	Canadian Football League player	
Vahid Tarokh	Graduate	Engineering	Professor at Harvard University	
Andrew Telegdi	Undergraduate	Politics	Canadian member of Parliament	
Brad Templeton	Undergraduate	Software	Software engineer and entrepreneur	
Carsten Thomassen	Graduate	Mathematics	Professor of graph theory at the Technical University of Denmark	
Susan Tighe	Graduate	Civil engineering	Canada Research Chair in Sustainable Pavement and Infrastructure Management	
Disguised Toast	Undergraduate	Computer Science/Mathematics	Gamer, influencer	
Claire J. Tomlin	Undergraduate	Science	Researcher	
Eric Veach	Undergraduate	Computer Science	Computer graphics	
Douglas N. Walton	Undergraduate	Arts	Author on argumentation, logical fallacies, and informal logic	
Judy Wasylycia-Leis	Undergraduate	Political science	Manitoba cabinet minister	
Elizabeth Weir	Undergraduate	Political science	Leader of the New Brunswick New Democratic Party	
David A. Weitz	Undergraduate	Physics	Mallinckrodt Professor of Physics & Applied Physics; professor of Systems Biology at Harvard University; director of the Harvard Materials Research Science & Engineering Center	
Chris Williams	Undergraduate	Fine arts	Animator, film director, screenwriter, and voice actor	
Jeff Wincott	Undergraduate	Kinesiology	Actor and athlete	
Elizabeth Witmer	Graduate	Politics	Member of Ontario provincial parliament	
Alexander Wong	Graduate/undergraduate	Computer Science	Scientist	
Bob Wong	Undergraduate	Science	Member of the Legislative Assembly of Ontario	
Ardeth Wood	Graduate	Philosophy	Died in a forcible drowning; the two-year search for her killer was one of the largest manhunts in Canada	
Steven Woods	Graduate/undergraduate	Mathematics	Founder of Quack.com	
John Wynne	Undergraduate	Sports	Ice hockey defenceman	
Tim Wynne-Jones	Undergraduate	Literature	Author of children's literature	
Catalina Yue	Undergraduate	Arts	Miss Universe Canada	
Matei Zaharia	Undergraduate	Computer science	Co-founder and CTO of Databricks, creator of Apache Spark, and co-creator of Apache Mesos	

=== Faculty ===
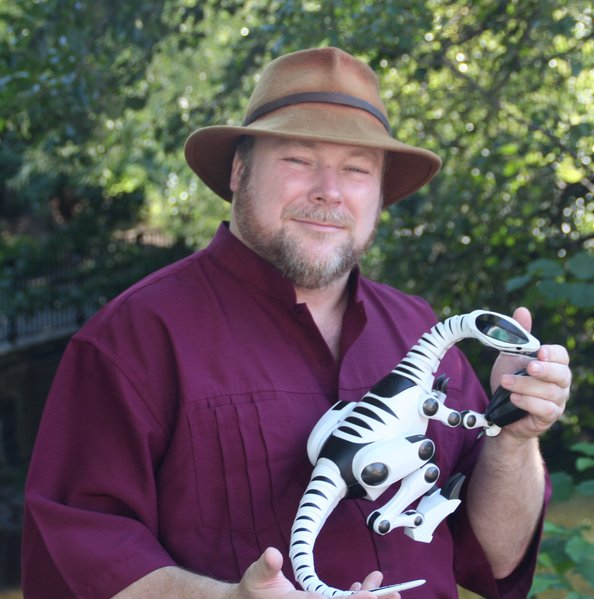
Mark Tilden, robotics researcher

Name	Relationship	Discipline	Known for	Notes
Gordon Agnew	Professor	Cryptography	Professor	
George Alfred Barnard	Lecturer	Mathematics	Statistics and quality control	
Walter Benz	Professor	Mathematics	Geometer	
Vijay Bhargava	Professor	Electrical engineering	Professor at the University of British Columbia	
Jonathan Borwein	Researcher	Mathematics	Mathematics researcher	
Phelim Boyle	Chairman	—	J Page R Wadsworth chairman at the University of Waterloo	
Tim Bray	Manager	—	Software developer and entrepreneur	
Thomas Brzustowski	Professor	Mechanical engineering	Engineer, academic, and civil servant	
Arthur Carty	Professor	Chemistry	National science advisor to the Government of Canada	
David Clausi	Professor	Systems design engineering	Design engineer	
Ken Coates	Dean	History	Dean of the Faculty of Arts	
C. B. Collins	Professor	Mathematics	Professor at the University of Texas at Dallas	
Gordon Cormack	Professor	Computer science	Dynamic Markov Compression co-creator	
David G. Cory	Professor	Chemistry	Canada Excellence Research Chair in quantum information processing	
Douglas E. Cowan	Professor	Religious studies	Professor at the University of Waterloo	
Purdy Crawford	Governor	—	Governor of the University of Waterloo	
Paul H. Cress	Lecturer	Computer science	WATFIV creator	
Kenneth Davidson	Professor	Mathematics	Fields Institute director	
Jon Dellandrea	Professor	Literature	Pro-vice-chancellor at the University of Oxford	
Jack Edmonds	Professor	Mathematics	Mathematician	
Mohamed Elmasry	Professor	Engineering	Writer for The Globe and Mail	
John R. English	Professor	Politics	Liberal member of Parliament for Kitchener	
Richard Epp	Professor	Physics		
Carla Fehr	Professor	Philosophy		
Eugene Forsey	Professor	History	Member of the Canadian Senate	
Bertram Fraser-Reid	Professor	Chemistry	2007 Musgrave gold medal winner from the Institute of Jamaica	
Keith Geddes	Professor	Mathematics	Maple co-creator	
Ian Goldberg	Professor	Cryptography	Radialpoint chief scientist	
Ian Goulden	Dean	Mathematics	Dean of the Faculty of Mathematics	
Art Green	Professor	Arts	Professor at the University of Waterloo	
Richard Gwyn	Chancellor	—	Chancellor of St. Jerome's University at the University of Waterloo	
Peter L. Hammer	Professor	Mathematics	Operations research and applied discrete mathematics	
Hiroshi Haruki	Professor	Mathematics	Mathematician	
Geraldine Heaney	Coach	—	Head coach for the University of Waterloo women's hockey team	
Ric Holt	Professor	Computer science	Turing creator	
Thomas Homer-Dixon	Professor	Environmental studies	Professor at the University of Waterloo	
Harold Horwood	Writer	—	Novelist and non-fiction writer	
David M. Jackson	Professor	Mathematics	Professor of combinatorics and optimization	
James Jupp	Professor	Political science	Political scientist and author	
James J. Kay	Associate professor	Ecology	Associate professor of environment and research studies	
Bryce Kendrick	Assistant professor	Biology	Assistant professor at the University of Waterloo	
Murray S. Klamkin	Professor	Mathematics	Mathematician	
Tuffy Knight	Coach	—	Football coach at the University of Waterloo	
Neal Koblitz	Professor	Cryptography	Professor at the University of Washington	
Maurice Kugler	Professor	Anthropology	Social anthropology	
Ziva Kunda	Professor	Arts	Psychologist	
Anita Layton	Professor	Applied Mathematics	Researcher and professor	
Brenda Lee	Lecturer	Science	Lecturer	
Anthony James Leggett	Researcher	Physics	Physics professor at the University of Illinois at Urbana–Champaign	
Melvin J. Lerner	Professor	Psychology	Just-world phenomenon	-
Robert J. LeRoy	Professor	Chemistry	Chemist	
Kenneth D. Mackenzie	Professor	Mathematics	Author of Organizational Hologram	
Lorenzo Magnani	Researcher	Philosophy	Philosopher	
Charles Malik	Lecturer	Philosophy	Diplomat	
Lee Maracle	Professor	Canadian culture	First Nations poet and author	
Fotini Markopoulou-Kalamara	Professor	Physics	Theoretical physicist	
Alfred Menezes	Professor	Cryptography	Certicom research associate, MQV co-inventor	
Wendy Mitchinson	Chairman	History	Canada Research Chair in gender history and medicine history	
John Moffat	Professor	Physics	Professor emeritus at the University of Toronto	
Bruce Muirhead	Professor	Arts	Historian	
Robert Mundell	Chairman	Economics	Nobel laureate in economics (1999), known for the Mundell–Fleming model; chairman of the Department of Economics at the University of Waterloo, 1972–1974	
Barton Myers	Professor	Architecture	President of Barton Myers Associates	
Robert Myers	Professor	Physics	Theoretical physicist, Royal Society of Canada Fellow	
Jan Narveson	Professor	Arts	Philosopher	
Crispin Nash-Williams	Professor	Combinatorics	Mathematician	
Brian Orend	Professor	Arts	Philosopher	
Josef Paldus	Professor	Mathematics	Professor of mathematics at the University of Waterloo	
Joe Paopao	Coach	—	Offensive coordinator for the Waterloo Warriors	
François Paré	Chairman	French literature	Chair of French Studies	
Raj Pathria	Professor (retired)	Physics	Distinguished Professor Emeritus	
William Richard Peltier	Professor	Earth sciences	Physics professor at the University of Toronto	
Vladimir Platonov	Professor	Mathematics	Professor of mathematics	
Victor Hugo Quintana	Professor (retired)	Engineering	Distinguished Professor Emeritus	
Ronald C. Read	Professor	Mathematics	Professor of mathematics at the University of Waterloo	
A. James Reimer	Professor	Theology	Professor at Conrad Grebel University College at UW	
Giacinto Scoles	Professor	Chemistry	Molecular beam methods for studying weak van der Waals forces	
Adel Sedra	Dean	Engineering	Dean of the University of Waterloo Faculty of Engineering	
Jeffrey Shallit	Professor	Computer science	Professor	
Gordon Slethaug	Professor	English	Professor of English at the University of Southern Denmark	
Lee Smolin	Professor	Physics	Theoretical physicist	
Paul G. Socken	Professor	Jewish studies	Professor of Jewish Studies at the University of Waterloo	
Doug Stinson	Professor	Mathematics	Member of Centre for Applied Cryptographic Research	
Donna Strickland	Professor	Physics	Awarded the Nobel Prize in Physics in 2018, together with Gérard Mourou, for the practical implementation of chirped pulse amplification	
John Stubbs	Professor	History	President of Trent University and Simon Fraser University	
Paul Thagard	Professor	Arts	Philosopher and cognitive scientist	
Robert Tibshirani	Undergraduate	Mathematics	Stanford professor and fellow of the Royal Society of Canada	
Mark Tilden	Professor	—	Robotics researcher	
Frank Tompa	Professor	Computer Science	Database researcher	
W. T. Tutte	Professor	Mathematics	World War II code breaker and founder of the Department of Combinatorics and Optimization at the University of Waterloo	
Robert Jan van Pelt	Professor	History	Architectural historian	
Scott Vanstone	Professor	Cryptography	Certicom founder, MQV co-inventor	
Sally Weaver	Professor	Anthropology	Chair of Anthropology	
Paul S. Wesson	Professor	Physics	Professor of physics at the University of Waterloo	
Zoey Williams	Pilot-in-residence	Aviation	Pilot-in-residence, the first to hold this position	
Lynne Woolstencroft	Professor	Political science	Former mayor of Waterloo, Ontario	
Douglas T. Wright	Professor	Civil engineering	Civil engineer, UW president emeritus	
Karen Yeats	Professor/undergraduate	Mathematics	Mathematical physicist	
Mark Zanna	Professor	Arts	Social psychologist	
Anne Zeller	Professor	Anthropology	Chair of Anthropology	

== Administration ==
=== Chancellors ===
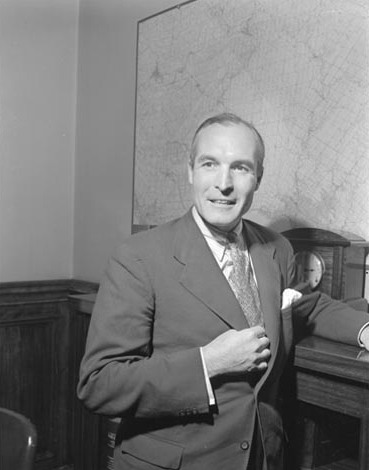
Dana Porter, the university's first chancellor

#	Name	Term	References
1	Dana Porter	1960–1966	
2	Ira G. Needles	1966–1975	
3	Carl Arthur Pollock	1975–1978	
4	Josef Kates	1979–1985	
5	J. Page Wadsworth	1985–1991	
6	Sylvia Ostry	1991–1997	
7	Val O'Donovan	1997–2003	
8	Mike Lazaridis	2003–2009	
9	Prem Watsa	2009–2014	
10	Tom Jenkins	2014–2018	
11	Dominic Barton	2018–2024	
12	Jagdeep Singh Bachher	2024–present	

=== Presidents ===
#	Name	Term	Note	References
1	Gerry Hagey	July 1, 1957 – January 31, 1969		
	Howard Petch	February 1, 1969 – June 30, 1970	President pro tem	
2	Burt Matthews	July 1, 1970 – June 30, 1981		
3	Douglas T. Wright	July 1, 1981 – April 14, 1993		
4	James Downey	April 15, 1993 – May 31, 1999		
5	David Lloyd Johnston	June 1, 1999 – September 30, 2010		
6	Feridun Hamdullahpur	October 1, 2010 – June 30, 2021		
7	Vivek Goel	July 1, 2021 – June 30, 2026		
8	Bill Rosehart	July 1, 2026 – present	current president	
