= Traditions and anecdotes associated with the Stanley Cup =

Informal history associated with Stanley Cup trophy

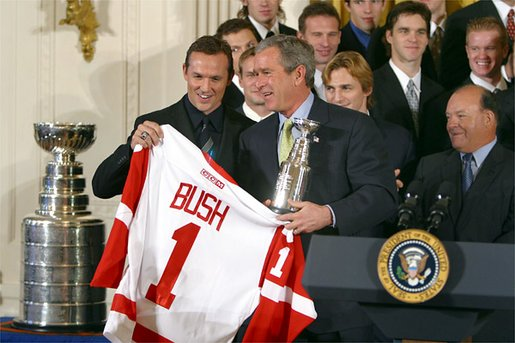
With the Stanley Cup present (l), U.S. President George W. Bush receives a commemorative jersey and mini-Cup from 2002 Stanley Cup Champion Detroit Red Wings captain Steve Yzerman. Detroit coach Scotty Bowman is at lower right.

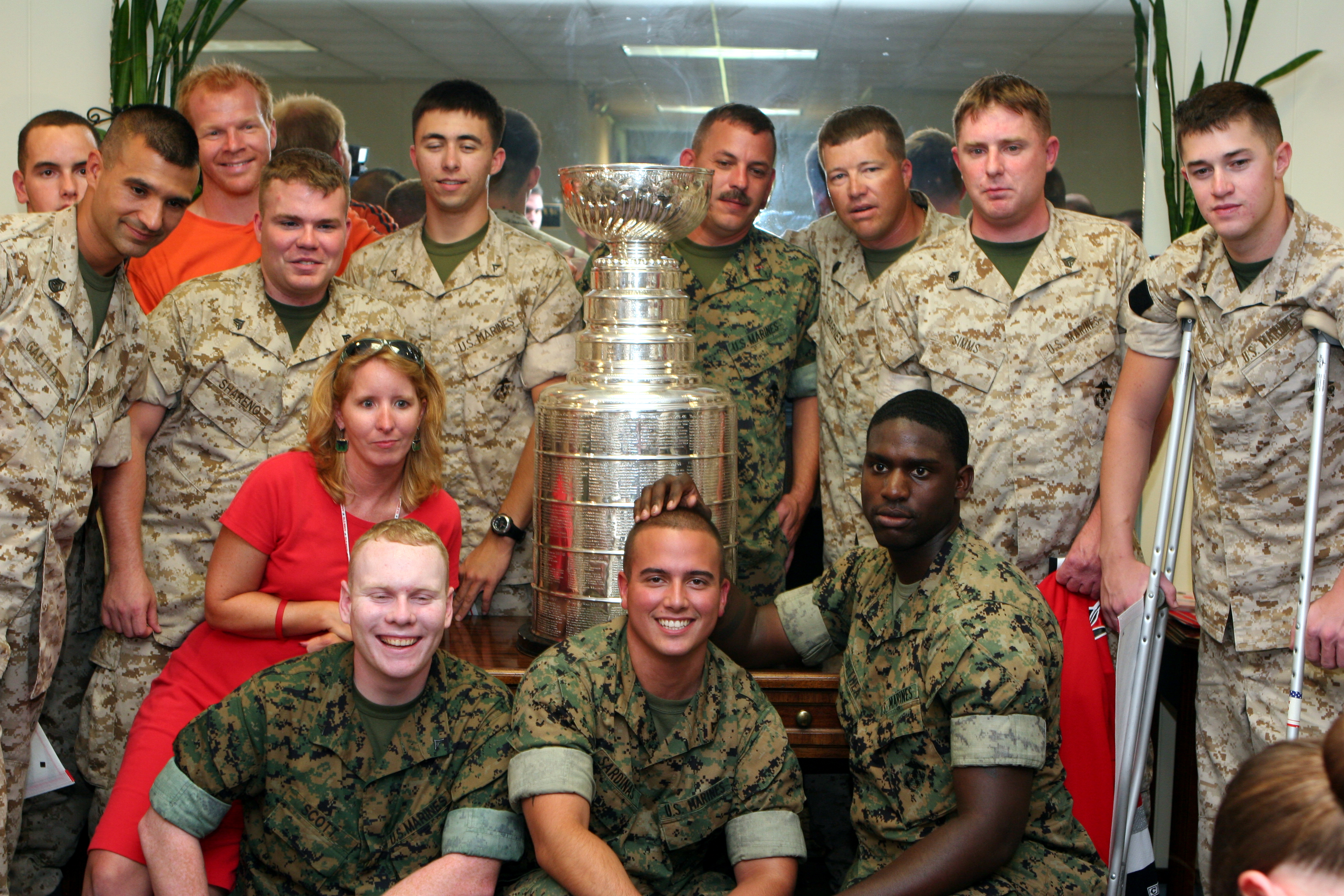
Wounded United States Marines pose with the Stanley Cup, with Glen Wesley of the 2006 Stanley Cup Champion Carolina Hurricanes in the background (upper left, in orange).

There are many traditions and anecdotes associated with the Stanley Cup. The Stanley Cup is the championship trophy of the National Hockey League (NHL), the major professional ice hockey league in Canada and the United States. It is commonly referred to as simply "The Cup", "The Holy Grail" or facetiously (chiefly by sportswriters) as "Lord Stanley's Mug".

Unlike the trophies awarded by the other three major professional sports leagues in the United States and Canada, a new Stanley Cup is not made annually; the champions keep the Cup until a new champion is crowned. It is also one of only two trophies in professional North American sports, which has the name of the winning players, coaches, management, and club staff engraved upon it, the other being the CFL's Grey Cup.

It is at the centre of several legends and superstitions. Many of these anecdotes involve the Stanley Cup being mistreated in some way. It is the most-travelled championship trophy in the world.

== Traditions ==
=== Drinking ===
One of the oldest traditions, started by the 1896 Winnipeg Victorias, dictates that the winning team drink champagne from the top bowl after their victory. During a Late Show with David Letterman Top Ten list entitled "Perks of Winning the Stanley Cup", which happened after the New York Rangers won the Cup in 1994, number one was "My friend, you can't drink beer out of a Nobel Prize!"

=== On-ice presentation ===
Another tradition is the on-ice presentation of the Cup by the NHL commissioner to the captain of the winning team after the series-winning victory. This differs from the championship trophy ceremonies in the other three major professional sports leagues in the United States and Canada, where the commissioners of Major League Baseball, National Basketball Association, and National Football League instead present the Commissioner's Trophy, Larry O'Brien Championship Trophy, and Vince Lombardi Trophy, respectively, to the owners of the winning team. The on-ice presentation of the Cup is typically preceded by the presentation of the Conn Smythe Trophy, in contrast to the other three leagues who usually present the World Series MVP, NBA Finals MVP, and Super Bowl MVP awards, respectively, after their championship trophy.

Possibly the first time that the Cup was awarded on the ice was to the 1932 Toronto Maple Leafs, and the practice became an annual tradition in the 1950s.

=== Captain hoisting the Cup ===
After receiving the Cup, the captain of the winning team traditionally takes a lap around the ice with the trophy hoisted above his head. The Cup is then handed off to each member of the victorious club so they can also skate with the trophy. Normally, the alternate captain who has waited the longest to win the Cup gets the first lap after the captain. Ted Lindsay of the 1950 Cup champion Detroit Red Wings became the first player (Sid Abel was captain of Red Wings in 1950) to skate around with it, slightly raised for the crowd. The hoisting of the Cup above their heads is sometimes credited to Frank Mahovlich of the Toronto Maple Leafs, who was photographed doing so after the 1963 Stanley Cup Final). There are a few exceptions:

==== 1988 ====
In what would be Wayne Gretzky's final Cup win and final game as a member of the Edmonton Oilers, he gathered his teammates, coaches, trainers, and others from the Oilers organization to join at centre ice for an impromptu team photo with the trophy. This tradition has been continued by every subsequent Stanley Cup champion.

==== 1993 ====
The 1993 championship was won by the Montreal Canadiens. As Gary Bettman presented the Cup to Canadiens' captain Guy Carbonneau, Carbonneau waved to Denis Savard to come join him. Savard, who had played 10 seasons for the Chicago Blackhawks before being traded to Montreal in 1990–91 (the Blackhawks had since been to the Stanley Cup Final in 1992), had not played in the Cup Final in his career. Carbonneau let Savard hoist the Cup in his place.

==== 1998 ====
The 1998 championship was won by the defending champions Detroit Red Wings. The previous year, several days after their first Stanley Cup in 42 years, Vladimir Konstantinov had been paralyzed in an automobile accident that also paralyzed team masseur Sergei Mnatsakanov. As Bettman gave the Cup to Red Wings' captain Steve Yzerman, he hoisted it before putting it on Konstantinov's lap and helping him parade with the trophy.

==== 2001 ====
The 2001 championship was won by the Colorado Avalanche. Until requesting a trade on March 6, 2000, Ray Bourque had played his entire career with the Boston Bruins. The seventh game of the 2001 Finals was the last of Bourque's 22-year NHL career. Though Bourque reached the Stanley Cup Final twice with the Bruins in 1988 and 1990, the Bruins fell both times to the Edmonton Oilers, and Bourque had never been on a Cup-winning team until joining the Avalanche. When captain Joe Sakic received the trophy, he did not hoist it, but instead immediately handed it to Bourque for him to hoist. Sakic then followed Bourque in hoisting the trophy.

=== Touching the Cup and Conference Trophies ===
Another tradition (or rather superstition) that is prevalent among today's NHL players is that no player should touch the Cup itself until his team has rightfully won the Cup. Adding to this superstition is some players' choice to neither touch nor hoist the conference trophies (Clarence S. Campbell Bowl and Prince of Wales Trophy) when these series have been won; the players feel that the Stanley Cup is the true championship trophy, and only it should be hoisted. However, many examples exist where the Stanley Cup champion picked up their respective conference trophy.

New York Islanders captain Denis Potvin hoisted the Wales Trophy during the 1982 and 1983 playoffs en route to the club successfully defending the Cup each time, sweeping the Vancouver Canucks in 1982 and the Edmonton Oilers in 1983. Prior to this, no conference championship trophy was presented during the playoffs; instead, the Wales Trophy and the Campbell Bowl were awarded to the teams with the best regular season records in the respective conferences (the Islanders won the Campbell Bowl in 1980–81).

However, in 1994, Stephane Matteau, then of the New York Rangers, admitted that he tapped the Wales Trophy with his stick's blade before the overtime period in game seven of the Eastern Conference Final. Matteau subsequently scored the game-winning goal in double overtime against the New Jersey Devils. Following the game, Mark Messier, the captain of the Rangers, picked up and raised the Wales Trophy after it was awarded to the team. After winning the Western Conference, Vancouver Canucks captain Trevor Linden lifted the Campbell trophy. The Rangers prevailed over the Canucks in a seven-game series to win the Cup.

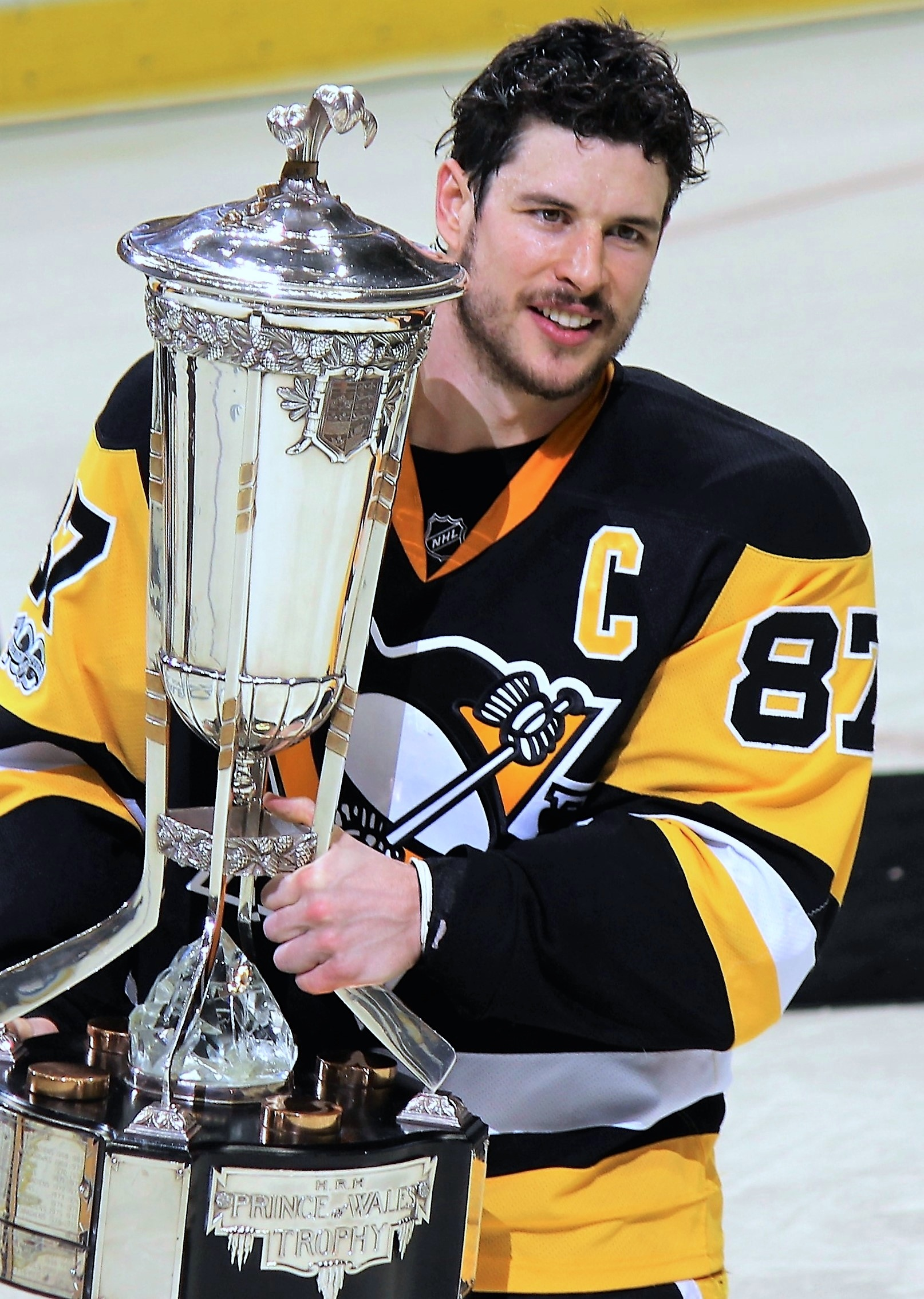
Sidney Crosby with the Prince of Wales Trophy in 2017

Between 2011 and 2015, none of the Stanley Cup finalists touched either the Campbell or the Wales trophies. The 2012 Los Angeles Kings, after defeating the Phoenix Coyotes in five games, went so far as leaving the Campbell Bowl in Phoenix. Tim Leiweke, President and CEO of Anschutz Entertainment Group (owner of the Kings), later drove the trophy in his car trunk from Phoenix to Los Angeles and showed it to 10,000+ fans that waited at LAX Airport to show their support. The Kings later went on to win the Stanley Cup that year.

Six of the last ten Stanley Cup champions from the Eastern Conference have picked up the Prince of Wales Trophy. The four exceptions were the 2011 Boston Bruins, the 2024 and 2025 Florida Panthers, and the 2026 Carolina Hurricanes. Out of the last ten Cup champions from the Western Conference, only the 2022 Colorado Avalanche chose to pick up the Campbell Bowl.

=== "Win today and we walk together forever" ===
This quote, written by Hockey Hall of Fame Philadelphia Flyers coach Fred Shero on the chalkboard in the team's locker room at the Spectrum before game 6 of the 1974 finals, which the Flyers won, has become synonymous with Stanley Cup-winning teams, particularly the 1974 Flyers as mentioned earlier.

== Adventures ==
One of the most recognized trophies in professional sports in the US and Canada, the Cup has logged more than 640,000 kilometres (400,000 mi) during the past five seasons alone, due to the tradition of giving the players on the winning team a day of celebration with the trophy during the summer off-season following the playoffs.

=== Players' day with Cup ===
Players have unofficially had a private day with the Cup, a tradition that started with the New Jersey Devils in 1995 wherein each member of the Cup-winning team is allowed personal possession of the Cup for a day. It is always accompanied by at least one representative from the Hockey Hall of Fame. The tradition became subject of an ESPN marketing campaign which showed players using the Cup: Ken Daneyko ate cereal out of it, Derian Hatcher used it as a cooler at a party, and Brett Hull locked himself out of his vehicle with the Cup inside while out shopping with Mike Modano. Tomas Holmström's cousin, Robert, used the trophy to baptize his seven-week-old daughter during Tomas' day with the Cup. Clark Gillies of the New York Islanders allowed his dog to eat out of the Cup. Dustin Brown of the Los Angeles Kings had his two older boys drink chocolate milk out of the Cup. In 2015, Chico Resch, 1979-80 Stanley Cup champion with the New York Islanders, was arranged for the opportunity to spend his day with the Trophy, an honor that was unavailable in his playing days. This happened upon his retirement as a color commentator for New Jersey Devils. A 2023 promo ad for ESPN's SportsCenter showed Stanley Cup champions Jack Eichel and Jonathan Marchessault of the Vegas Golden Knights running the trophy through a dishwasher, cleaning it up after a summer of day-with-a-player activities in preparation for the 2023–24 NHL season.

=== Europe ===
The Cup first left North America in 1996 when it went to Sweden with Peter Forsberg; he took it to Stockholm as well as to his hometown Örnsköldsvik. In Russia, it has been to Red Square and a soccer game at Luzhniki Stadium in Moscow, and to a monument near Yekaterinburg marking the geographic boundary between Europe and Asia. It went west to Kyiv, Ukraine, for the first time with Tampa Bay Game-7 hero Ruslan Fedotenko; Carolina Hurricanes defenceman Anton Babchuk returned with it, again to Kyiv. After 114 years, the Cup made a trip in April 2006 back to London, where it was originally purchased. A plaque was placed at the site of the store where Lord Stanley purchased the Cup. In 2007, the Cup went to Helsinki, Finland, with Anaheim Ducks' forward Teemu Selänne. Tomas Holmström took the trophy to his hometown Piteå in Sweden in the summer of 2008. He used the trophy as a baptismal font for his niece, and also as a serving dish for pitepalt. Boston Bruins' captain Zdeno Chára took the Cup to Slovakia after winning it in 2011. In 2012, Anze Kopitar took the Cup to his home country of Slovenia and hoisted it atop Bled Castle after the Los Angeles Kings won that year.

=== North America ===
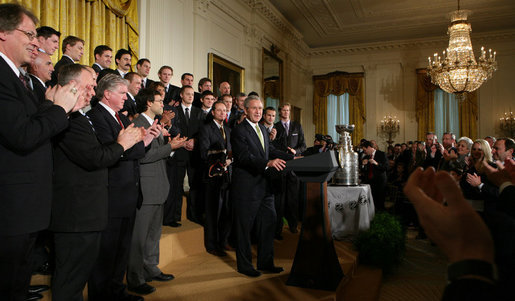
George W. Bush welcomes the 2007 champion Anaheim Ducks.

The Stanley Cup went to Port Dover, Ontario, with Jassen Cullimore when the Tampa Bay Lightning won the Cup. He was the fourth NHLer to take the Cup to this small hockey town on the shore of Lake Erie. It went to Simcoe, Ontario with Rob Blake when the Colorado Avalanche won the Cup. A parade was held in his honor, and a private party was thrown for family and friends. Assistant Coach Colin Campbell took it to his hometown Tillsonburg, Ontario after the New York Rangers won in 1994. Daniel Cleary took the Cup to his hometown of Harbour Grace, Newfoundland. As the first Newfoundlander to win the Cup, he attracted an estimated crowd of 27,000 to the tiny community of just over 3,000. The Cup went to the top of Fisher Peak, near Cranbrook, British Columbia and the top of Mount Elbert in Colorado. Brad Richards from Murray Harbour, Prince Edward Island took the Stanley Cup out on a fishing boat after the Tampa Bay Lightning won the Cup. It went to an Aboriginal Métis Nation Settlement, and it went to an igloo in Rankin Inlet. It served as the engagement ring bearer for the Tampa Bay Lightning's André Roy while in a helicopter flown by Guy Lafleur. In 2022, Nazem Kadri brought the Stanley Cup with him to the London Muslim Mosque in his hometown of London, Ontario, becoming the first NHL player to bring the trophy to a Muslim place of worship.

The Cup has experienced Los Angeles celebrity glamour, having been taken on a roller coaster ride at Universal Studios Hollywood, and to the Hollywood Sign by Luc Robitaille. It also took part in the 2008 Tournament of Roses Parade as part of Anaheim city's float, accompanied by player Brad May as his Anaheim Ducks team were the current reigning champions.

It was also a White House guest of Ronald Reagan, George H. W. Bush, Bill Clinton, George W. Bush, Barack Obama, Donald Trump, and Joe Biden, and it is currently a tradition of the U.S. president to invite the NHL champion if the team is from an American city. It is a similar tradition for the Prime Minister of Canada to invite the winners, if it is a Canadian team that wins, to Ottawa (however, no Canadian team has won the Cup since the Montreal Canadiens did so in 1993). The Cup has appeared on The Pat McAfee Show, Corner Gas, the Late Show with David Letterman, Meet the Press with Tim Russert, Late Night with Conan O'Brien, The Tonight Show with Jay Leno, and The Tonight Show with Jimmy Fallon. It has served as the baptismal font for Sylvain Lefebvre's daughter.

The Cup has even gained experience as an "actor". It has appeared in several scenes of the long-running soap opera Guiding Light. It also appeared on Boston Legal where William Shatner knocked it off a balcony, and on the 30 Rock episode "Subway Hero". It also appeared on Chicago Fire along with the Keeper of the Cup, Phil Pritchard.

On a humanitarian note, the Cup visited wounded United States Marines at Camp Lejeune with Glen Wesley after his Carolina Hurricanes won the Cup in 2006.

After the Chicago Blackhawks win in 2010 the Cup appeared in the 2010 Chicago Gay Pride Parade, with team representative defenceman Brent Sopel. Sopel appeared to honor his friend, Toronto Maple Leafs general manager Brian Burke, Burke's late son, Brendan and the Burkes' example of family support and tolerance.

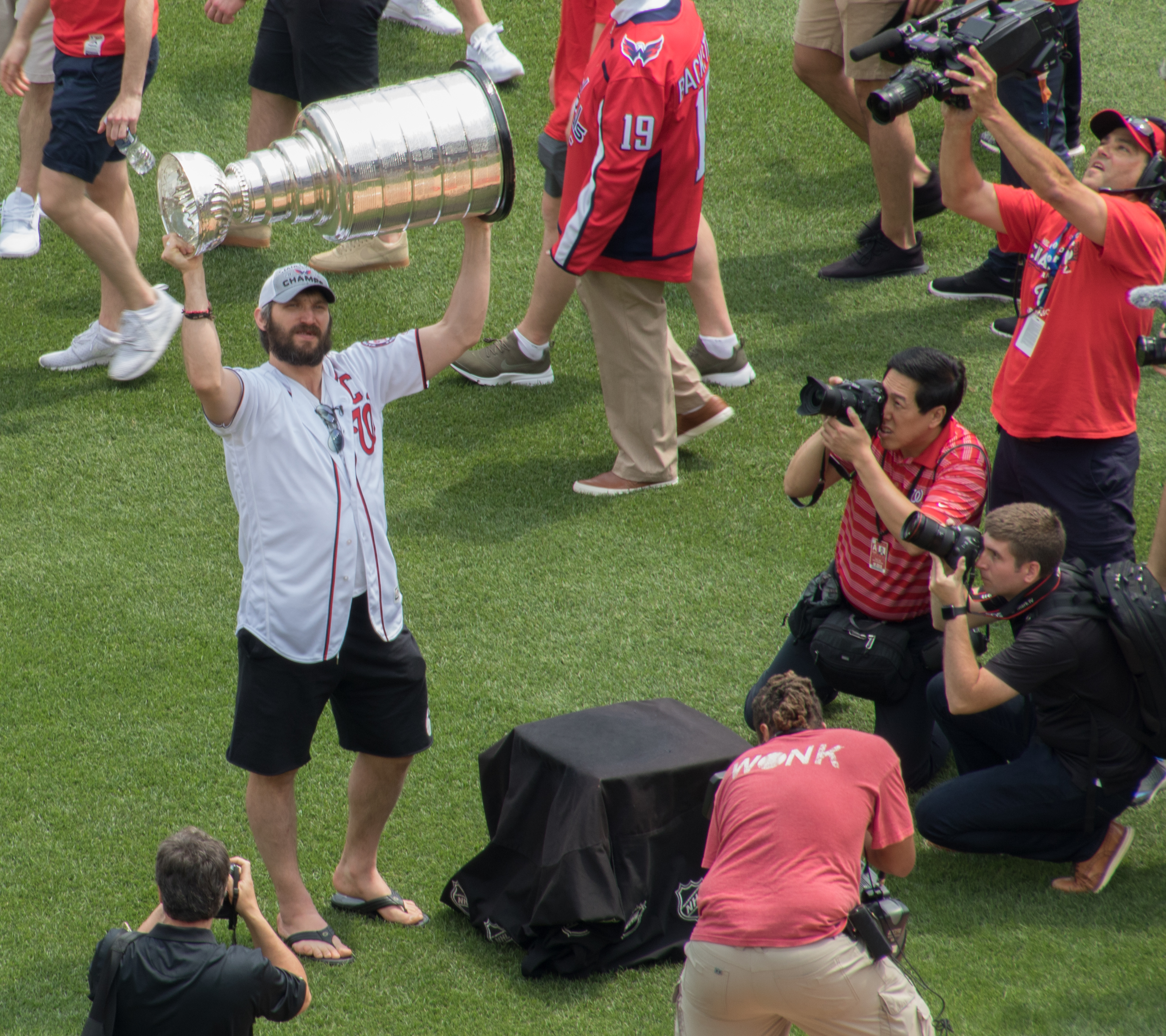
Alex Ovechkin celebrating with the Stanley Cup at Nationals Park while attending a Nationals game in 2018

During decommissioning of the Space Shuttle Atlantis, the Cup visited the orbiter's flight deck after being taken to Florida. Jeremy Jacobs, the owner of the 2011 NHL champion Boston Bruins, took the Cup to Florida for employees involved in the decommissioning to view and photograph.

On May 7, 2016, the morning of the Kentucky Derby, the NHL brought the Cup to Churchill Downs in Louisville, Kentucky for a photo session with race favorite Nyquist, named after then-Detroit Red Wings player Gustav Nyquist. Nyquist would go on to win the Derby.

When the Washington Capitals won the Cup in 2018, team captain Alex Ovechkin and his teammates took the Cup around Washington, DC and celebrated with the team's fans. Among the many locations where Ovechkin took the Cup included other sporting events and public squares.

=== Afghanistan ===
On May 2, 2007, the Stanley Cup arrived in Kandahar on a Canadian Forces C-130 Hercules transport aircraft. Seventeen former players played a ball hockey game versus Canadian soldiers on a concrete rink in the Afghan desert.

== Misadventures ==
The Cup has also been mistreated, misplaced, or otherwise misused on numerous occasions.

One legend is that in 1905, a member of the Ottawa Senators (also known as the "Ottawa Silver Seven") tried to drop kick the Cup across the Rideau Canal after the championship banquet. The attempt failed, and the Cup was not retrieved until the next day; the canal was still frozen over. The Ottawas had been celebrating their decisive Stanley Cup win over the Dawson City Nuggets. Several of the Ottawa players were also members of the Ottawa Football Club. However, Bill Westwick, Ottawa Journal sports editor and the son of Silver Seven player Rat Westwick, and NHL commissioner Frank Calder both deny it ever happened. No contemporary reports support the legend, although champagne was drunk from the Cup that night.

In 1906, weeks after members of the Montreal Wanderers left it at a photographer's studio, officials learned that the photographer's mother was using the Cup to plant geraniums. In 1907, a Kenora Thistles team manager threatened to throw the Cup into the Lake of the Woods in a dispute over the eligibility of two Thistles players.

In 1924, members of the Montreal Canadiens, en route to celebrate their win at owner Leo Dandurand's home, left it by the road after repairing a flat tire. The Cup was recovered exactly where they left it. In 1925, Lynn and Muzz Patrick, the sons of Victoria Cougars manager-coach Lester Patrick, discovered the Cup in the basement of their home, and scratched their names on it with a nail. In 1940, their names were properly engraved on it as members of the champion New York Rangers. They also urinated in the Cup with teammates.

During the 1940–41 NHL season, the mortgage on Madison Square Garden was paid. The management publicly celebrated by burning the mortgage in the Cup. Some fans claimed this act "desecrated" the Cup, leading to the Curse of 1940, which allegedly caused the Rangers to wait 54 years for another win.

In 1957, Maurice "Rocket" Richard chipped both of his front teeth while drinking from the Stanley Cup.

In the Chicago Stadium, in the spring of 1961, the Montreal Canadiens were losing the final game of a playoff series to the Chicago Black Hawks. A Montreal fan (Ken Kilander) in the stands was upset, so he left his seat, ran down to the front lobby and broke into the glass showcase where the Stanley Cup was on display. He grabbed the Cup, hoisted it over his shoulders and made for the exit before he was arrested. In court, he explained his behaviour to the judge: "Your Honor, I was simply bringing the Cup back to Montreal where it belongs."

In 1962, the Toronto Maple Leafs won the Stanley Cup. During a party after the win, the trophy was dropped in a bonfire and badly damaged. It was repaired at the expense of the team.

In 1964, Red Kelly of the Toronto Maple Leafs posed for a photo with his infant son sitting in the Cup, only to find the child had urinated in it. Kelly was quoted years later as saying it has always since made him laugh to see players drinking out of the Cup.

In 1970, after much wear and tear, the Cup was fully replaced with a duplicate known as the "Presentation Cup" made in 1963 and a second duplicate called the "Permanent Cup", which remains at the Hockey Hall of Fame. From this point on, in official functions and player days with the Cup, it is the Presentation Cup that is in circulation.

Clark Gillies of the New York Islanders filled the Cup with dog food and let his dog eat out of it. He defended doing so by saying "He's a good dog."

The New York Islanders' Bryan Trottier admitted to sleeping with the Cup (as have, apparently, dozens of players).

In 1987, the Edmonton Oilers' Mark Messier took it to his favourite club in his hometown of St. Albert, Alberta, and let fans drink out of it. It wound up slightly bent in various places for unknown reasons. It was repaired at a local automotive shop, and shipped back to the Hockey Hall of Fame.

The 1991 Pittsburgh Penguins and 1993 Montreal Canadiens decided to test its buoyancy by tossing it into Mario Lemieux's and Patrick Roy's respective pools (then–Canadiens' captain Guy Carbonneau observed "The Stanley Cup does not float.") Dominik Hašek had his 2002 visit with the Cup cut short for doing the same.

After the parade in their honor in 1994, members of the New York Rangers, including Mike Richter, took the Cup to McSorley's Old Ale House, locked the doors, and for 45 minutes allowed the patrons to hoist it above their heads and drink McSorley's Dark and Light out of it. The New York Post reported the next day that the Cup was taken back by the league for "repairs" to its base. Later, several New York Rangers took the Cup to Belmont Park, filled it with oats, and let Kentucky Derby winner Go for Gin eat out of it.

The 1999 Dallas Stars' Stanley Cup party was hosted at the house of Stars defenceman Craig Ludwig and Pantera drummer Vinnie Paul. At the party, Stars forward Guy Carbonneau (apparently having forgotten the Cup's lack of buoyancy from his 1993 adventures) allegedly attempted to throw the Cup from the upstairs deck into the house's Crown Royal shaped pool below. The Cup caught the lip of the pool, producing a large dent. Mike Bolt, one of the "Keepers of the Cup" for the NHL, stated that this never happened. "What happened was that one of the players was posing with it next to the pool when someone pushed him into the water, and it went in with him. It was in the water maybe two seconds," Bolt said. "It was a real good party from what I understand." The trophy was dented the previous day, when a player dropped it during a locker room celebration, Bolt said.

In 1999 and 2003, the Cup made a trip to Joe Nieuwendyk's alma mater, Cornell University, both times visiting a local college bar. In 2003, Martin Brodeur ate popcorn out of the Cup. It had butter stains and salt damage for the next eight days before Jamie Langenbrunner cleaned it. In 2003, the Cup was slated to make its first-ever visit to Slovakia with New Jersey Devils' Jiri Bicek, but was left behind in Canada; it was on the next flight out of Toronto. Finally, on August 22, 2004, Walter Neubrand, keeper of the Cup, boarded a plane to Fort St. John, British Columbia, to deliver it to Tampa Bay Lightning head scout Jake Goertzen. However, Air Canada officials at Vancouver International Airport removed it before takeoff because of weight restrictions. The Cup spent the night in the luggage area, 1,200 kilometres (750 mi) away. It was flown to Fort St. John the following day.

In 2007, a photoshoot on the set of the NBC television series Heroes showed actors Milo Ventimiglia and Hayden Panettiere "goofing off" with the Cup, including worshiping, walking with, and Hayden licking and kissing the trophy.

Also, in May 2007, the Cup made it to the set of ABC's Boston Legal, a series written and created by former college hockey player David E. Kelley. In the Episode "Duck and Cover", Denny Crane pulls some strings to get his hands on the Cup for a day. While on loan, he takes it up to his office where he decides to engrave his name on it, noting that, "They'll never notice. It's got so many dings on it already." That evening, he takes it to his penthouse office patio where he decides to drink scotch out of it with Alan Shore. After they take turns drinking out of the Cup, Denny sets it on the balcony ledge in preparation for taking pictures with it, but accidentally knocks it over. With a long, speechless pause, they watch the Cup tumble off the balcony to land on the street below. And with a loud, graceless metallic 'clunk', Alan comments, "That will leave a significant ding!"

On June 7, 2007, after the Anaheim Ducks won the Cup, their captain Scott Niedermayer brought the trophy to the set in Los Angeles of Jim Rome is Burning. While the Cup was on set, the associate producer of JRIB, Travis Rodgers, hoisted and posed with the Cup. The images were then posted on Jim Rome's website, which upset many Canadians, who called Rome's radio show on June 8 to complain that Rodgers had disrespected the Cup. Don Cherry called into the program to defend Rodgers, stating his belief that he did not disrespect the Cup at all.

On June 6, 2008, after the Red Wings' Stanley Cup Parade, the Stanley Cup was pushed off a table at Chris Chelios' Chili Bar in Detroit, Michigan and received a dent, which was later smoothed out. After the 2008 NHL Awards, it was revealed that the damage was more extensive than originally realized.

A week after the same Detroit team won the Cup, Kris Draper's newborn daughter defecated in the Cup as she sat in it. The Cup was thoroughly cleaned and Draper reportedly drank from it that same day.

On October 9, 2008, Def Leppard's Joe Elliott placed the Cup upside down on a pedestal on the stage during one of their NHL Face-Off Rocks segments at the Fox Theater in Detroit. Red Wings defenseman Chris Chelios claimed the musician disgraced the Cup on purpose. Shortly after the incident, an article on Def Leppard's website appeared with Elliott claiming that every other sports Cup he had ever seen before then was smaller at its base than at the top, so he thought this Cup was no different.

On June 17, 2010, the Chicago Tribune swabbed the Cup for germs. A lab tech for EMSL Analytical stated no staph, salmonella or E. coli were found and the general bacteria count was 4% of what is typically found on an office desk. On April 21, 2011, it was traveling in Quebec City when its vehicle broke down forcing keeper of the Cup Mike Bolt to hitchhike with the Cup.

On August 30, 2011, during Michael Ryder's day with the Cup, it fell off a table at a media event in St. John's, Newfoundland and Labrador. This was just prior to the Cup's departure to Ryder's home town of Bonavista, Newfoundland and Labrador.

On July 12, 2021, during a strong thunderstorm at an outdoor celebration following the conclusion of the Tampa Bay Lightning's victory parade, Patrick Maroon accidentally dropped the Stanley Cup due to the rainy conditions, damaging the bowl. The Cup had to be sent back to be repaired in Montreal before the players could have their day with the trophy.

On June 26, 2022, during the on-ice celebrations immediately after winning the Stanley Cup, Nicolas Aubé-Kubel of the Colorado Avalanche tripped on his way to the team photo and fell to the ice denting the base of the Cup in the process. Later that week, the Cup handlers delivered the Cup to the wrong house. The handlers intended to deliver the Cup to Avalanche player Gabriel Landeskog, however instead delivered it to a Denver couple who reportedly had a similar address to Landeskog. In that same week, another mishap occurred, involving Kurtis MacDermid. MacDermid fell in a Denver bar while holding the Cup, however he kept it safe by falling backwards, which kept the Cup from any contact with the ground.

The day after the Florida Panthers won their first Stanley Cup in team history in 2024, alternate Captain Matthew Tkachuk and some other players from the Panthers took the Cup to celebrate with fans at the Elbo Room in Fort Lauderdale. After pouring beer onto fans from the balcony, Tkachuk carried the Cup across the street where he jumped in the Atlantic Ocean with the Cup.
