= Douglas Tyndall Wright =

Canadian civil engineer (1927–2020)

Douglas Tyndall Wright OC

President of the University of Waterloo
- In office 1981–1993
- Preceded by: Burt Matthews
- Succeeded by: James Downey

Personal details
- Born: October 4, 1927 Toronto, Ontario
- Died: May 21, 2020 (aged 92)
- Spouse(s): Margaret Maxwell, Zella Wolofsky
- Children: William Maxwell, Matthew Clyde, Robert Tyndall, Sarah Jane, Anna Marie

Douglas Tyndall Wright, OC (October 4, 1927 – May 21, 2020) was a Canadian civil engineer, civil servant, and university president.

Wright was born in Toronto, Ontario, the son of Etta Frances Tyndall and George Charles Wright. He received a B.A.Sc. from the University of Toronto in 1949, a Master of Science degree in 1952 from the University of Illinois Urbana-Champaign, and a Ph.D. from Trinity College, Cambridge in 1954. In 1954, he joined the Department of Civil Engineering at Queen's University becoming Associate Professor by 1958. In 1958, he became a Professor of Civil Engineering at the University of Waterloo. He was Chairman of the Department of Civil Engineering from 1958 to 1963 and was Dean of the Faculty of Engineering from 1959 to 1966.

From 1967 to 1972, he was the Chairman of the Committee on University Affairs for the Province of Ontario. From 1969 to 1972, he was the Chairman of the Commission on Post Secondary Education in Ontario. From 1972 to 1979, he was Deputy Provincial Secretary for Social Development and from 1979 to 1980, he was Deputy Minister of Culture and Recreation. From 1981 to 1993, he was the President, and Vice-Chancellor of the University of Waterloo. During Wright's tenure at University of Waterloo, and in part because of his influence, The Kitchener-Waterloo region became established as a high-tech mecca and became known as "Silicon Valley North". From 1995 to July 2007, he was a member of the Board of Directors of Research in Motion, Bell Canada, Meloche Monnix Insurance, London Life Insurance Company, Perimeter Institute, Stratford Festival, McMichael Canadian Art Collection, and many more.

In 1991, he was made an Officer of the Order of Canada. In 1993, he was made a Knight (chevalier) in France's Ordre National du Mérite. In 1995, he received the Sir John Kennedy Medal from the Engineering Institute of Canada. He was a Fellow of the Canadian Academy of Engineering and of the Engineering Institute of Canada. He received honorary degrees from Carleton University, Brock University, Memorial University of Newfoundland, Concordia University, Northeastern University, Strathclyde University, Université de Technologie de Compiègne, Université de Sherbrooke, Queen's University, McMaster University, University of Toronto, and the University of Waterloo.

Wright was visiting professor Universidad Nacional Autónoma de Mexico, 1964, 1966, Université de Sherbrooke, 1966-1967. Construction engineering Netherlands and MexicanPavilions Expo, 1967, Palacio de los Deportes (Olympic Sports Palace), Mexico City, 1968, Ontario Place Dome and Forum, 1971.

He was a Technical Advisor for Toronto Skydome, 1984-1992, renamed Rogers Centre. A member of the Premier's Council on Science and Technology, Ontario, 1985-1991, as well as The Prime Minister of Canada National Advisory Board for Science and Technology, 1985-1991.

Dr Wright was also Canada's representative on Council for International Institute for Applied Systems Analysis IIASA Laxenburg, Austria, 1986-1997, and Prime Minister's personal representative to Council of Ministers of Education, 1990-1991.

He died on May 21, 2020.

== See also ==
- List of University of Waterloo people
