= James Kay =

James Kay may refer to:

- James Kay (British inventor) (1774–1857), British inventor
- James J. Kay (1954–2004), ecological scientist and policy-maker
- Sir James Kay-Shuttleworth, 1st Baronet (1804–1877), British politician and educationalist
- James Kay (artist) (1858–1942), Scottish artist
- James Franklin Kay (born 1948), American professor
- James Ellsworth De Kay (1792–1851), American zoologist
- James Kay (Kentucky politician) (born 1982), member of the Kentucky House of Representatives
- James Kay (golfer) (1855–1927), Scottish golfer

== See also ==
- James Kaye (disambiguation)
