= Ira Needles =

Chancellor of the University of Waterloo from 1966 to 1975

2nd Chancellor of the University of Waterloo
- In office 1966–1975
- Preceded by: Dana Porter
- Succeeded by: Carl Pollock
- President/Vice Chancellor: Gerry Hagey (1966–1969); Burt Matthews (1969–1975)

Personal details
- Born: 1893 Mount Vernon, Iowa, U.S.
- Died: January 6, 1986 (aged 92–93)
- Children: William Needles
- Education: Coe College (undergraduate); Northwestern University (graduate)

Ira George Needles (1893 – January 6, 1986) was the second chancellor of the University of Waterloo, holding the position from 1966 to 1975.

== Personal life ==
Needles was born in Mount Vernon, Iowa, in 1893. He received his undergraduate degree at Coe College in Cedar Rapids, Iowa, and his graduate degree in business administration at Northwestern University in Evanston, Illinois. He had a daughter and two sons, Lauranna Jones, William and Myron (Bud), with his wife Marian. Needles died at his home in Waterloo on January 6, 1986.

== B. F. Goodrich ==
After school, Needles began working at B. F. Goodrich (now known as Goodrich Corporation) in 1916 in Akron, Ohio. He moved to Waterloo, Ontario, Canada in 1925 after Goodrich purchased the Ames-Holden Rubber Company, and worked at its office as an assistant sales manager, and was eventually promoted to several positions including general manager of the tire division (1930), vice-president of sales, and chairman of the board (1958). After 26 years, he eventually rose to the position of president of B.F. Goodrich Canada, in 1951. He resigned from B.F. Goodrich in 1960.

During World War II, Needles served as a technical advisor for the Government of Canada to help ration rubber, which was a strategic material during the war.

== University of Waterloo ==
In the summer of 1956, Needles gave a speech at the Rotary Club of Kitchener-Waterloo entitled WANTED: 150,000 Engineers – The Waterloo Plan. In this presentation, Needles offered a different approach to education that would include both studies in the classroom and training in industry that would eventually become the basis of the cooperative education program at the University of Waterloo. Needles suggested that universities and industry should work together to fill the growing need for skilled graduates. In 1958, he was named the first Kitchener-Waterloo Citizen of the Year by the K-W Jaycees and was a member of the Kitchener Chamber of Commerce.

Waterloo College (now Wilfrid Laurier University) planned to open a science faculty that would become known as the Waterloo College Associate Faculties in 1957. Needles—along with his B.F. Goodrich colleague, then-president of Waterloo College, and first president of the University of Waterloo, Gerald Hagey—founded the Waterloo College Associate Faculties, which later became the University of Waterloo, with Needles' vision of a cooperative education program that involved industry. After founding the university, Needles served as chairman of its board of governors from 1956 to 1966 and then became chancellor from 1966 to 1975.

== See also ==
- List of University of Waterloo people
