= Tony Knowles =

Tony Knowles may refer to:

- Tony Knowles (politician) (born 1943), former governor of the U.S. state of Alaska
- Tony Knowles (snooker player) (born 1955), English snooker player
- Tony Knowles (chemist), former president, British Columbia Institute of Technology

== See also ==
- Tony Knowles Coastal Trail, a bike trail in Anchorage, Alaska named for the American politician
