= Howard Petch =

Canadian academic administrator

Howard Earle Petch
- Born: May 12, 1925; Agincourt, Ontario
- Died: November 26, 2018 (aged 93); Victoria, British Columbia
- Awards: Order of British Columbia

Howard Earle Petch, OBC FRSC (12 May 1925 – 26 November 2018) was a Canadian academic administrator. Petch was the president of the University of Waterloo and the University of Victoria.

He received a Bachelor of Science, honours in physics and chemistry from McMaster University in 1949. He received his Ph.D. in physics from the University of British Columbia in 1952. He joined the department of physics at McMaster University in 1954. From 1958 to 1961 he was the chairman of the department of metallurgical engineering and was the director of research from 1961 to 1963. From 1963 to 1967, he was the principal of Hamilton College.

In 1967, he became the vice-president (academic) and a professor of physics at the University of Waterloo. From 1969 to 1970, he was the president pro tem of the University of Waterloo. In 1975, he became president and vice-chancellor of the University of Victoria. He also was a professor of physics. He retired in 1990.

In 1990, he was awarded the Order of British Columbia. He was a Fellow of the Royal Society of Canada.

The Petch building at the University of Victoria, which houses the department of Biochemistry and Microbiology, was named in his honour.

== See also ==
- List of University of Waterloo people

Academic offices
Preceded by Stephen A. Jennings, acting	President of the University of Victoria; 1975–1990	Succeeded by David F. Strong
