= Kenneth D. Mackenzie =

American organizational theorist (born 1937)

Kenneth D. Mackenzie (born 1937) is an American organizational theorist, former professor at the University of Kansas and management consultant. He is known for his early work on the "Theory of Group Structures" and his later work on organizational design

== Biography ==
Mackenzie received his BA in mathematics with a minor in Physics in 1960 from the University of California, Berkeley, where in 1964 he also obtained his Ph.D. in Business Administration.

After his graduation Mackenzie started his academic career in 1964 at the Carnegie-Mellon University as assistant professor of economics. In 1967 he moved to the Wharton School of the University of Pennsylvania at the University of Pennsylvania. In 1972 he moved to the University of Kansas, where he was appointed Edmund P. Learned Distinguished Professor from January 1972 to January 2006. He further taught at U.C. Berkeley, University of Waterloo, and KU. In 2000 Mackenzie founded the consultancy firm EMAC Assessments, LLC.

Mackenzie has served on numerous editorial boards including Management Science, Organizational studies, International Journal of Organizational Analysis, Journal of Management Inquiry, Human Systems Management, and Engineering Management Research.

He has published 19 books and over 100 articles.

== Work ==
Mackenzie research interests have been in the fields of organization theories, organization design processual models, organizational leadership, multi-level research and the discoverer of the organizational hologram.

=== Representing Group and Organizational Structures and Processes ===
As a researcher, a teacher, an author, and an editor, he frequently encounters the difficulty of how to represent fundamental concepts such as leadership, structure, and process. In particular, the representations of structure and group and organizational processes are especially interesting and important because they cut across the group and organizational sciences.

In this regard, he has learned two things worth mentioning produced over a course of many years of research into organizational phenomena: the representation of group and organizational (a) structures and (b) processes. Both concepts are central to discussions of group and organizational processes (GOPs). And neither is represented consistently among scholars and practitioners. The result is confusion and barriers to cumulation. For how can one build on another's results when the other's methods and concepts are inconsistent with one's own?

=== Representing Group and Organizational Structures ===
A structure, S_{n}, of a group or organization of n agents, X_{n} = (x_{1}, x_{2}, ..., x_{i}, ..., x_{n}) can be represented by this equation:

S_{n} = (X_{n}; R) (Equation 1)

where the matrix R has n rows and n columns and entries r_{ij} where row i corresponds to the "sender," x_{i}, the column j corresponds to the "receiver," x_{j}, and the value of an entry r_{ij} is a measure of an interaction from x_{i} to x_{j}. The value of r_{ij} can range from a binary relation such as a boss-subordinate to how many thousands of board feet of douglas fir, 4-side finished, eight foot 2 x 4's were sold by wholesaler i to retailer j during a specified time period.

The x_{i} ϵ X are engaged Processual Agents such as individuals, groups (e.g. committees, task forces, virtual teams, etc.), and even organizations. The dimension and measures for the entries, r_{ij}, are chosen for the purposes of an analysis. In this representation of group and organizational structures, the entries r_{ij} reflect the actual relationship between its members relevant to the purposes of the study. Please note the asymmetry: r_{ij} rarely equals r_{ji} . Also, in some applications, not all of the Processual Agents x_{i} ϵ X are, in fact, human.

Given this representation of group and organizational structures, the following conclusions have strong empirical support:

1. Structures are more accurately viewed as effects rather than causes of behavior.
2. Different tasks may have different structures.
3. Groups and organizations have multiple structures.
4. These structures are interdependent.
5. Structures can and do change.
6. A structure represents a need satisfying interaction pattern. As needs change, so will the structures to satisfy them as long as there is net benefit for the change.
7. These structural change processes can be modeled and explained.
8. Most group and organizational behavior takes place "outside" of the formal lines of authority. Departures from the organizational chart are normal.
9. Processes and their structures are independent.

=== Representing Group and Organizational Processes ===
Any group and organizational process (GOP) can be represented as:

Y = F(C) (Equation 2)

where C is a vector of considerations or steps in a GOP, F is a network illustrating the linkages between each of the considerations or steps, and Y is the set of outcomes of the GOP.

Intuitively, a GOP is a time dependent sequence of behaviors governed by a process framework given by equation (2). The GOP representation of equation (2) is derived from these six ontological axioms:

1. A GOP involves one or more processual agents.
2. A GOP involves two or more linked process elements.
3. A GOP is not random.
4. A GOP is linked to at least one other GOP.
5. A GOP representation requires process resources and involves their characteristics-in-use.
6. A GOP has more than one level.

== Bibliography ==
=== Books ===
- Mackenzie, Kenneth D. (1976). A theory of group structures. New York: Gordon and Breach. 2 vols.
- Mackenzie, Kenneth D. "Organizational design: The organizational audit and analysis technology." Ablex Pub, 1986.
- Mackenzie, K. D., (1991). "The Organizational Hologram: The Effective Management of Organizational Change." Boston, MA: Kluwer Academic Publishers.
- Mackenzie, K. D., (2015). "Group and Organizational Processes, Volume I: The Quest to Discover Their Essence." Saarbrücken, Deutschland / Germany: Lambert Academic Publishing.

=== Articles ===
- Bernhardt Irwin, Mackenzie Kenneth D (1972). "Some problems in using diffusion models for new products" (PDF). Management Science. 19 (2): 187–200. doi:10.1287/mnsc.19.2.187.
- Mackenzie Kenneth D., House Robert (1978). "Paradigm development in the social sciences: A proposed research strategy". Academy of Management Review. 3 (1): 7–23. doi:10.2307/257572. JSTOR 257572.
- Mackenzie Kenneth D (1986). "Virtual positions and power". Management Science. 32 (5): 622–642. doi:10.1287/mnsc.32.5.622.
- Mackenzie, Kenneth D. (Jan 2000). "Processes and their frameworks". Management Science. 46 (1): 110–125. doi:10.1287/mnsc.46.1.110.15126.
- Mackenzie, Kenneth D. "Group and organizational processes." In S. M. Dahlgaard-Park (Ed.), "The Sage Encyclopedia of Quality and the Service Economy." Los Angeles, CA: Sage Reference, pp. 269–275.
- Mackenzie, Kenneth D. "Organizational hologram." In S. M. Dahlgaard-Park (Ed.), "The Sage Encyclopedia of Quality and the Service Economy." Los Angeles, CA: Sage Reference, pp. 467–170.

== See also ==
- List of University of Waterloo people
