= Amanda Burk =

Canadian artist

- Education: BA Hons. University of Waterloo MFA NSCAD University
- Known for: Drawing
- Website: amandaburk.com

Amanda Burk is an artist from Ontario who specializes in drawing. Burk previously taught as an Associate Professor at Nipissing University in the Department of Fine Arts and Visual Arts.

== Early life and education ==
Burk grew up in Kitchener-Waterloo, Ontario. She attended the University of Waterloo and graduated with an Honours BA Fine Arts Studio Specialization, English Minor in 2001. Burk also received a Masters of Fine Arts from the Nova Scotia College of Art and Design in 2003.

== Career ==
=== Artistic practice ===
Burk's art is represented by Halde Galerie in Widen, Switzerland and Graphite Galleries in New Orleans, Louisiana. Her work has been exhibited internationally in Los Angeles, Miami and Peoria, Illinois.

In 2009, Burk moved to North Bay, Ontario and began featuring wild animals in her drawings. Burk's most recent solo exhibition, Stories of Contentment and Other Fables, was held at the Thunder Bay Art Gallery from January 13 to March 26, 2017. This exhibition featured large-scale drawings of mammals found in Northern Ontario and explored the ideas of human survival instincts and innate behaviours using animal imagery. This exhibition was supported by a grant from the Ontario Arts Council.

Burk's work, Full Circle (unrest), was selected for Manifest's International Drawing Annual (INDA 11). The 2017 publication features 120 works by 81 artists and an essay by Morgan Laurens.

=== The Line Gallery ===
The Line Gallery in North Bay was founded by Burk in 2011, which is the first gallery in Canada dedicated to exhibiting contemporary Canadian drawing. Since its inception, the gallery has held twenty-five solo exhibitions of Canadian artists who specialize in drawing.

== See also ==
- List of University of Waterloo people
