= Hiroshi Haruki =

Japanese mathematician

Hiroshi Haruki (春木 博, Haruki Hiroshi; died September 13, 1997) was a Japanese mathematician. A world-renowned expert in functional equations, he is best known for discovering Haruki's theorem and Haruki's lemma in plane geometry.

Some of his published work, such as: "On a Characteristic Property of Confocal Conic Sections" is available (open source) on Project Euclid.

Haruki earned his MSc and PhD from Osaka University and taught there. He was a professor at the University of Waterloo in Canada from 1966 till his retirement in 1986. He was a founding member of the university's computer science department (1967).

== See also ==
- List of University of Waterloo people
