= Fotini Markopoulou-Kalamara =

Greek physicist (born 1971)

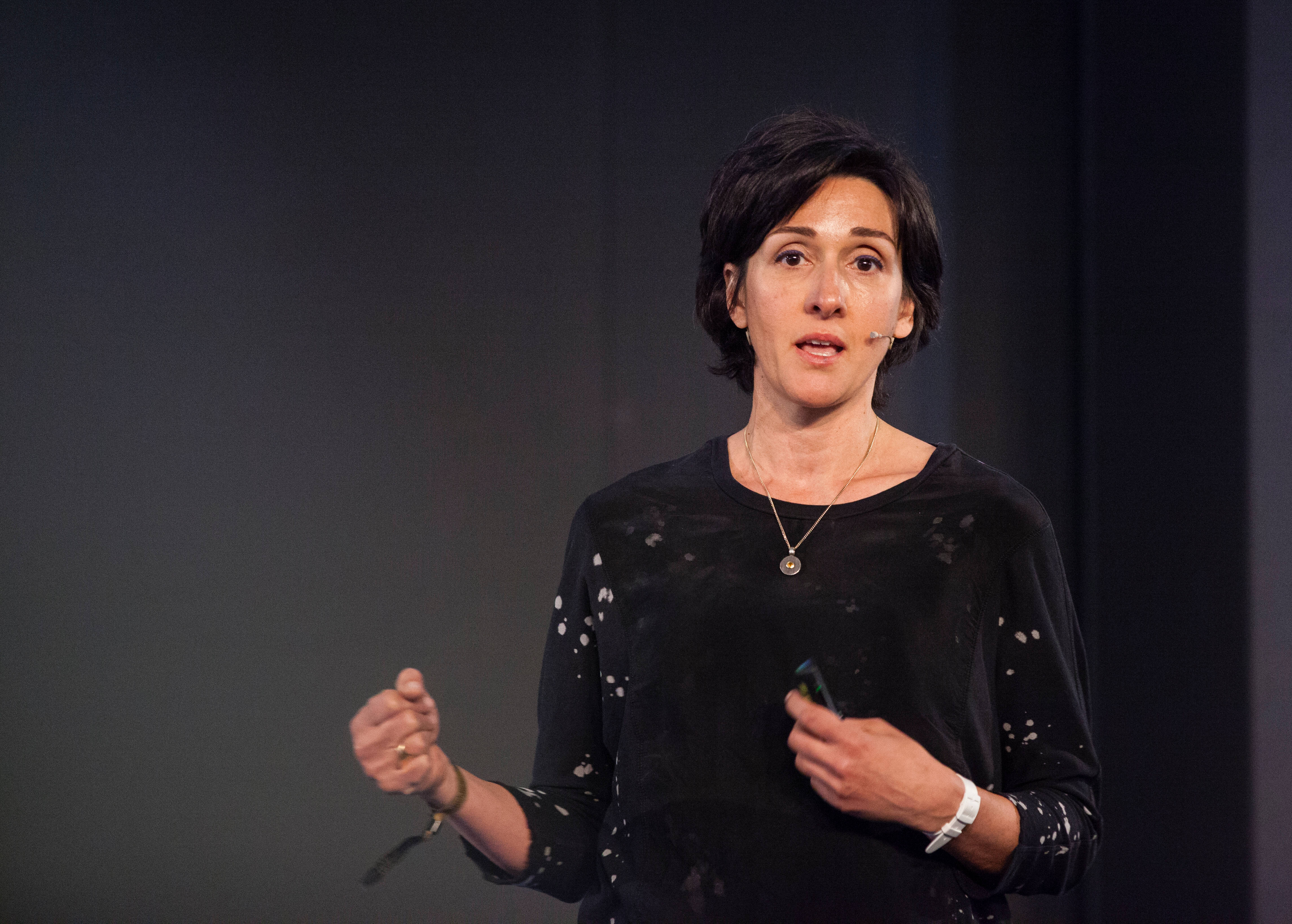
- Born: April 3, 1971 (age 55); Athens, Greece
- Education: Queen Mary University of London; Imperial College London; Royal College of Art
- Scientific career
- Fields: Theoretical physics Design engineering Technology
- Workplaces: Pennsylvania State University; Imperial College London; Max Planck Institute for Gravitational Physics; Santa Fe Institute; Perimeter Institute for Theoretical Physics
- Academic advisors: Christopher Isham

Fotini G. Markopoulou-Kalamara (Greek: Φωτεινή Μαρκοπούλου-Καλαμαρά; Born April 3, 1971) is a Greek theoretical physicist and design engineer. She has worked in quantum gravity, quantum mechanics and quantum cosmology, technological evolution in complex systems, embodied cognition technologies, and the design of organizations that foster innovation and science research. Markopoulou is principal at ComplexReal, an interdisciplinary collective tracking sensitive intervention points (SIPs) in the interface between science, technology and culture. She was a founding faculty member at Perimeter Institute for Theoretical Physics and co-founder and CEO of Empathic Technologies.

== Background ==
Markopoulou was born in Athens to sculptors Dimitris Kalamaras and Maria Vassilatou. She received her PhD from Imperial College London (1998). Markopoulou held postdoctoral positions at the Max Planck Institute for Gravitational Physics, Imperial College London, and the Pennsylvania State University and was a visiting professor at the Massachusetts Institute of Technology and the Santa Fe Institute for Complex Systems. She shared First Prize in the Ultimate Reality Symposium in honor of J.A. Wheeler at Princeton, New Jersey and received the Alexander von Humboldt Award for Experienced Researchers (2010).

In 2014, Markopoulou received a Double Masters in Innovation Design Engineering (IDE) from the Royal College of Art and Imperial College London (2014), an interdisciplinary program focused on impactful innovation through critical observation, design thinking, emergent technologies and enterprise activities. Her Masters group project won the Deutsche Bank Award for Creative Enterprise (Design Category) 2014 and was exhibited at the John Lewis Future Store.

== Quantum Gravity ==
In her interdisciplinary paper "The Internal Description of a Causal Set: What the Universe Looks Like from the Inside", Markopoulou instantiates some abstract terms from mathematical category theory to develop straightforward models of space-time. It proposes simple quantum models of space-time based on category-theoretic notions of a topos and its subobject classifier (which has a Heyting algebra structure, but not necessarily a Boolean algebra structure). For example, hard-to-picture category-theoretic "presheaves" from topos theory become easy-to-picture "evolving (or varying) sets" in her discussions of quantum spacetime.

In 2008, Markopoulou, Tomasz Konopka, Mohammad H. Ansari, and Simone Severini initiated the study of a new background independent model of evolutionary space called quantum graphity. As described in George Musser's book, Spooky Action at a Distance, in the quantum graphity model, points in spacetime are represented by nodes on a graph connected by links that can be on or off. This indicates whether or not the two points are directly connected as if they are next to each other in spacetime. When they are on the links have additional state variables which are used to define the random dynamics of the graph under the influence of quantum fluctuations and temperature. At high temperature the graph is in Phase I where all the points are connected to each other and no concept of spacetime as we know it exists. As the universe cools, the model undergoes a phase transition to Phase II where spacetime emerges as low connectivity and geometrical symmetries in the model graph. The hypothesis of quantum graphity is that this geometrogenesis models the condensation of spacetime in the Big Bang. A second model, related to ideas around quantum graphity, has been published.

Markopoulou is one of the quantum gravity researchers that use the quantum computation framework to formulate new quantum theories of gravity. In her paper The Computing Spacetime she has given an easily accessible overview of these ideas.

== Perimeter Institute ==
In 1999, Dr. Markopoulou was invited, along with Rob Myers and Lee Smolin, to found the Perimeter Institute for Theoretical Physics in Waterloo, Canada. With an initial donation of $100 million from Mike Lazaridis (founder of Blackberry), the Perimeter Institute describes itself as one of the “world’s foremost centers for research, graduate training, and educational outreach in theoretical physics, uniting public and private partners, and the world’s best scientific minds, in a shared enterprise to achieve breakthroughs that will transform our future.” Markopoulou left Perimeter in 2011, after Perimeter's new director Neil Turok decided to change the Institute's focus and strategy.

== Empathic Technologies ==
From 2014 to 2022, Dr. Markopoulou was co-founder and CEO at Empathic Technologies, employing cutting-edge discoveries in embodied cognition to create technologies that change how people perceive, feel, and behave. Empathic's wearable product, doppel, is a wristband that reduces stress. Peer-reviewed trial results found that doppel had a significant calming effect during a socially stressful situation. She received a U.S. Patent for this invention in 2016, and won the Best Female-Led Investment 2018 Award from the UK Business Angels Association.

== Evolution of Technologies ==
With Eric Beinhocker, Doyne Farmer and Steen Rasmussen, Markopoulou participated in the Working Group on The Growing Gap between Social and Physical Technologies. In complex systems, physical technologies are ways to organize matter, energy or information, while social technologies are ways to organize people and their behavior (for example institutions, laws, norms and narratives). Several times throughout history, situations have emerged when our physical technology has outpaced our social technology. She co-organized two workshops at SFI to bring together engineers, scientists, writers, historians, lawyers, futurists, economists, philosophers, founders, philanthropists, and policymakers, to identify tracking indicators for such transitions and create roadmaps of scenarios and options. An account of the outcomes was published in the 2020 Aeon article "Collaborators in Creation". The two workshops were filmed and formed the basis of the award-winning documentary Solutions by Pernille Rose Grønkjær.

Prompted by the impact of the COVID-19 pandemic on mental health, Markopoulou expanded the focus of Empathic and led an interdisciplinary research team on an intensive year-long project on the future of emotions and emotion technologies.
