= Gordon Stewart Anderson =

Canadian writer (1958–1991)

Gordon Stewart Anderson (1958 – July 8, 1991) was a Canadian writer, whose novel The Toronto You Are Leaving was published by his mother 15 years after his death.

Anderson was born in Hamilton, Ontario, raised in Sault Ste. Marie and lived for many years in Toronto. He graduated from the University of Waterloo and the University of Western Ontario. A gay man, Anderson died of AIDS-related causes. He is remembered on the Canadian AIDS Memorial Quilt.

A number of years after his death, his mother Marlene Lloyd discovered that a small publishing house had an unpublished manuscript for The Toronto You Are Leaving, a novel Anderson had written about life in Toronto's gay community in the late 1970s. She submitted the manuscript to several other publishers without success, and eventually edited and self-published the novel herself in 2006. The novel garnered a strong review in The Globe and Mail, as well as significant attention in Canada's gay press.

Marlene Lloyd had also previously published a book of her own, Not a Total Waste: The True Story of a Mother, Her Son and AIDS, about Anderson's death. She subsequently pitched a screenplay adaptation of Anderson's novel, although the film was never produced.

== See also ==
- List of University of Waterloo people
