= Alexander Wong (scientist) =

Chinese-Canadian scientist

- Education: University of Waterloo
- Known for: Artificial Intelligence, quantitative explainable AI (XAI), automatic machine learning (AutoML)
- Scientific career
- Doctoral advisor: David Clausi, Paul Fieguth
- Website: http://eng.uwaterloo.ca/~a28wong

Alexander Wong is a professor in the Department of Systems Design Engineering and a Co-Director of the Vision and Image Processing Research Group at the University of Waterloo. He is the Canada Research Chair in Artificial Intelligence and Medical Imaging, a Founding Member of the Waterloo Artificial Intelligence Institute and a Member of the College of the Royal Society of Canada and a Fellow of the Institute of Engineering and Technology. He is also a Fellow of the Institute of Physics, a Fellow in the International Society for Design and Development in Education, a Fellow of the Royal Society for Public Health and a Fellow of the Royal Society of Medicine.

== Education ==
Wong was educated at the University of Waterloo, where he holds a BSc in computer engineering, a MSc degree in Electrical and Computer Engineering, and a PhD in systems design engineering. He held an NSERC postdoctoral research fellowship at Sunnybrook Health Sciences Centre, Ontario Canada.

== Career ==
Wong has authored and co-authored over 600 scientific articles and holds over 30 patents and patent applications in various fields ranging from computational imaging to artificial intelligence, and computer vision to multimedia systems. Wong is particularly noted for his significant research contributions in quantitative explainable AI (XAI), trust quantification, automatic machine learning (AutoML), and computational imaging methods such as correlated diffusion imaging

== Selected publications ==
- Kumar, Devinder; Wong, Alexander; Clausi, David A. (June 2015). "Lung Nodule Classification Using Deep Features in CT Images". 2015 12th Conference on Computer and Robot Vision. Halifax, NS, Canada: IEEE. pp. 133–138. doi:10.1109/CRV.2015.25. ISBN 978-1-4799-1986-4. S2CID 10423518.
- Wong, Alexander; Clausi, David A. (May 2007). "ARRSI: Automatic Registration of Remote-Sensing Images". IEEE Transactions on Geoscience and Remote Sensing. 45 (5): 1483–1493. Bibcode:2007ITGRS..45.1483W. doi:10.1109/TGRS.2007.892601. ISSN 0196-2892. S2CID 3134193.
- Wang, Linda; Lin, Zhong Qiu; Wong, Alexander (11 November 2020). "COVID-Net: a tailored deep convolutional neural network design for detection of COVID-19 cases from chest X-ray images". Scientific Reports. 10 (1): 19549. arXiv:2003.09871. Bibcode:2020NatSR..1019549W. doi:10.1038/s41598-020-76550-z. ISSN 2045-2322. PMC 7658227. PMID 33177550.
- Mishra, A.; Wong, A.; Bizheva, K.; Clausi, D. A. (2009). "Intra-retinal layer segmentation in optical coherence tomography images". Optics Express. 17 (26): 23719–23728. Bibcode:2009OExpr..1723719M. doi:10.1364/oe.17.023719. PMID 20052083.
- Shafiee, Mohammad Javad; Chywl, Brendan; Li, Francis; Wong, Alexander (18 September 2017). "Fast YOLO: A Fast You Only Look Once System for Real-time Embedded Object Detection in Video". arXiv:1709.05943 [cs.CV].
- Orchard, Jeff; Ebrahimi, Mehran; Wong, Alexander (October 2008). "Efficient nonlocal-means denoising using the SVD". 2008 15th IEEE International Conference on Image Processing. pp. 1732–1735. doi:10.1109/ICIP.2008.4712109. ISBN 978-1-4244-1765-0. S2CID 2490560.

== See also ==
- List of University of Waterloo people
- YOLO Object Detection Guide
