= Victor Hugo Quintana =

Distinguished professor emeritus from University of Waterloo

Victor Hugo Quintana (born November 25, 1936) is a retired distinguished professor emeritus from the University of Waterloo.

== Career ==
Victor Hugo Quintana graduated from the Federico Santa María Technical University in 1959 with Dipl. Ing. degree. He graduated from the Electrical Engineering program at the University of Wisconsin–Madison, in 1965 with a M.Sc. degree where he developed the Y-Transform. He graduated from the University of Toronto in 1970 with a Ph.D. degree focused on numerical methods for solving optimal control problems.

He was on faculty with the University of Waterloo, Department of Electrical and Computer Engineering, from 1973 until 2002 and was part of the Power and Energy Systems Group.

His research interests focused on numerical optimization techniques, state estimation, control theory, power transmission lines, economics markets, and de-regulated power systems. He has published over 100 scientific journal papers and has over 3,200 citations. He has given invited lectures and short courses in Australia, Brazil, Belgium, Canada, Chile, China, Colombia, Egypt, Mexico, Trinidad and Tobago, Spain, and the United States of America.

== Honors ==
Quintana was elected by the Institute of Electric and Electronic Engineers (IEEE) as a Fellow on January 1, 2001, for his research contributions to power system optimization techniques and power engineering education. He was recognized as a “distinguished professor emeritus” by the University of Waterloo on June 17, 2011.

== Personal life ==
Quintana was in Temuco, Chile, and raised in Pucon, Chile, located in the Province of Cautín, Araucanía Region. He married Mone Quintana in Santiago, Chile, in 1960. They had two sons.

== See also ==
- List of University of Waterloo people
