= Haruki's Theorem =

Geometry Theorem

Illustration of Haruki's Theorem: $\frac{s_1}{s_2} \cdot \frac{s_3}{s_4} \cdot \frac{s_5}{s_6} = 1$

Haruki's Theorem says that given three intersecting circles that only intersect each other at two points that the lines connecting the inner intersecting points to the outer satisfy:
$$s_1 \cdot s_3 \cdot s_5 = s_2 \cdot s_4 \cdot s_6$$
where $s_1, s_2, s_3, s_4, s_5, s_6$ are the measure of segments connecting the inner and outer intersection points.

The theorem is named after the Japanese mathematician Hiroshi Haruki.
