= W. G. Godfrey =

Canadian historian

William G. Godfrey (1941–2008) was a Canadian historian that specialized in the history of the Maritime Provinces. He received his BA and MA degrees from the University of Waterloo and his PhD from Queen's University. He was department chair at Mount Allison University. In 2007 Godfrey was granted the title of Professor Emeritus at Mount Allison University.

== Select publications ==
- "Some Thoughts on the Dictionary of Canadian Biography and Maritime Historiography." Acadiensis 7.2 (1978), 107–115.
- "Canadian History Text Books and the Maritimes." Acadiensis 10.1 (1980), 131–135.
- Pursuit of Profit and Preferment in Colonial North America: John Bradstreet's Quest. Waterloo, Ontario: Wilfrid Laurier University Press, 1982.
- "'A New Golden Age': Recent Historical Writing on the Maritimes." Queens Quarterly 91.2 (1984): 350–382.
- "Some Participants Missing but a Great Deal Present." Acadiensis 20.2 (1990), 249–253.
- "'A Vision Beyond Reach':Some Recent Atlantic Canadian Studies." Journal of Canadian Studies 28 (1993–94)
- "'Into the Hands of the Ladies': The Birth of the Moncton Hospital." Acadiensis 27 (1997)
- "'The Peoples in Between': Phips, Eddy and Acadie/Nova Scotia." Acadiensis 29.2 (2000), 147–155.
- The Struggle to Serve : A History of the Moncton Hospital, 1895 to 1953. Montreal: McGill-Queen's University Press, 2004.
- "A Fortified Town and a World War Profitably Re-Examined." Acadiensis 33 (2004).
- "'The Trickle is Worth Noting':Common Law and Consumerism in Early Newfoundland History. Acadiensis 35 (2005).

== See also ==
- List of University of Waterloo people
