= Gordon Agnew =

Canadian engineering professor

Academic background
- Education: University of Waterloo (BASc, PhD)

Academic work
- Discipline: Engineering
- Sub-discipline: Encryption; Data security
- Institutions: University of Waterloo

Gordon B. Agnew is a Canadian engineering professor at the University of Waterloo. Agnew's primary research interests are in the fields of encryption and data security.

== Education ==
Agnew earned a B.A.Sc. degree in electrical engineering from the University of Waterloo in 1978 and a Ph.D. in 1982.

== Career ==
After earning his PhD, Agnew joined the electrical and computer engineering department of University of Waterloo. Agnew also co-founded Certicom, which was later acquired by BlackBerry Limited. Agnew joined Peer Ledger as Co-CEO in 2019.

Agnew is a Foundation Fellow of the Institute of Combinatorics and its Applications and is a Fellow of the Canadian Academy of Engineering.

== See also ==
- List of University of Waterloo people
