= Paul G. Socken =

Canadian literary critic

Paul G. Socken

Paul G. Socken (born 1945) is a professor emeritus at the University of Waterloo in Waterloo, Ontario, Canada and a leading scholar on the work of French-Canadian author Gabrielle Roy. He is also the founder of the department of Jewish Studies at the University of Waterloo.

Socken holds a B.A. and a Ph.D. (1974) from the University of Toronto. He is a specialist in French-Canadian literature, particularly in the novel. He has done research on the thematic and stylistic aspects of Gabrielle Roy's writing, and currently publishes in the area of mythology and French-Canadian literature.

Socken has written over a hundred articles for the Canadian Jewish News, the Algemeiner and the Jewish Journal of LA.

== Personal life and career ==
Socken was born to Jewish immigrants in 1945 in downtown Toronto. His father was a factory worker at a purse factory in the city. At the age of 11 his mother died, and a few years later his father remarried to a Jewish immigrant from Romania. Socken attended local schools throughout his childhood.

He attended the University of Toronto, then earned his master's at the University of Iowa. He then returned to Toronto, where he worked on his Phd in French Canadian literature.

He met his wife Rochelle Ash, daughter of Jewish Polish holocaust survivors, during these formative years of his life. They married in 1970.

In 1973 they moved to Waterloo Ontario, where he served as associate professor. He attained full professor status and eventually served as chair of the department of French Literature for six years. He remained at the university for 37 years.

While living in Waterloo, Socken and his wife had two daughters, Suzanne and Deborah. The family was prominent in the local synagogue, Beth Jacob, led by Rabbi Philip Rosenzweig. Socken served as president of the synagogue for some time, and Rochelle taught in the Jewish after-school program. The Socken family returned to Toronto in 1990.

== Works ==
=== Books ===
- The Edge of the Precipice: Why Read Literature in the Digital Age? (2013)
- Why Study Talmud in the Twenty-First Century?: The Relevance of the Ancient Jewish Text to Our World (2009)
- Intimate Strangers (2004)
- Gabrielle Roy Today / Gabrielle Roy aujourd'hui (2003)
- The French They Never Taught You (with José Binamé) (2002, ISBN 1-55130-214-4)
- Patrimoines: La Francophonie en Amérique du nord (with P.H. Dubé and Ann Dubé) (1992)
- The Myth of the Lost Paradise in the Novels of Jacques Poulin (1993)
- Concordance de Bonheur d'occasion de Gabrielle Roy (1982)
- Myth and Morality in Alexandre Chenevert by G. Roy (1987)

=== Chapters/articles in books ===
- "Gabrielle Roy: An Annotated Bibliography": The Annotated Bibliography of Canada's Major Authors (1979)

== Professional and community affiliations ==
- Association of Quebec and Canadian Studies
- Association of Canadian Studies in the United States
- Association française d'études canadiennes

== See also ==
- List of University of Waterloo people
