= Peter Besler =

Canadian investment advisor and author

Peter Besler (born October 5, 1963) is an investment advisor and author residing in Toronto, Ontario, Canada. Born in Waterloo, Ontario, Besler is known for raising public funds in order to finance Canadian companies conducting research into the treatment of serious and terminal illnesses. Since 1986, his efforts have benefitted numerous biotechnology and medical research companies conducting pre-clinical and phase I, II, and III human clinical trials.

== Biography ==
Besler was a co-op chemistry student at University of Waterloo. In 1982, he grew concerned that scientific research in Canada was inadequately funded. He co-led the Progressive Conservative Party Campus Youth in 1983. Switching his area of study, he graduated with a degree in Economics in 1986. Shortly after graduation he moved to Toronto and studied investment banking under Gerszon Taichman. In 1994, Besler traveled to China with the purpose of establishing in-vitro fertilization clinics with researchers from Cornell University. In 2001, he became aware of promising research conducted by Dr. Ingrid Katz at the University of Edmonton into a treatment for multiple sclerosis . In 2003, he was instrumental in obtaining the financing required to receive Health Canada approval for advancing this research through phase II human clinical trials. The trials received FDA fast track approval in 2008.

Besler is involved in philanthropic and volunteer work for several Canadian charitable organizations.

== Medical research ==
Besler's fundraising has financed areas of medical research including, scleroderma, diabetes, cardiovascular disease, prostate cancer, breast cancer and multiple sclerosis. He has directed his support towards researchers with promising results who no longer are receiving research grants from charitable organizations. "It is surprising to the public that most advanced research into treatments for serious illnesses is not funded by charities nor governments. Private investors are often the only source available to companies seeking to cover the enormous funding costs associated with clinical trials." Besler has stated.

== Investment advice ==
Besler has authored several books on finance and investment including The PEARL Approach - Protected Effective Asset Risk Limitation investment strategy and Investment Advisor Training Guide. In addition, Besler was a featured columnist in Canadian Money Saver with Morris I. Bubbis. In 2012, Besler became the most widely read feature columnist for The Northern Miner newspaper and Mining Markets magazine.

== See also ==
- List of University of Waterloo people
