= Gordon Slethaug =

American Canadian professor of English

Gordon E. Slethaug is an American Canadian professor of English currently working at the University of Southern Denmark, Campus Kolding. He was the head of the American Studies Programme at the University of Hong Kong. He worked also at the University of Waterloo at Waterloo, Ontario, Canada.

== Books ==
- Teaching Abroad: International Education and the Cross-cultural Classroom. In Google Books.
- Beautiful Chaos: Chaos Theory and Metachaotics in Recent American Fiction. In Google Books.
- The Play of the Double in Postmodern American Fiction In Google Books.
- Understanding John Barth, (by Stan Fogel and Gordon Slethaug).

== See also ==
- List of University of Waterloo people
- Intercultural Communication
