= Khaled Al Sabawi =

- Born: October 1, 1983 (age 42)
- Education: University of Waterloo
- Employer(s): Union Construction and Investment, MENA Geothermal, Open Screenplay
- Notable work: TABO, Etihad Villas
- Board member of: Union Construction and Investment, Ahlia Insurance
- Spouse: Daliah Vakili
- Children: Darius Noah Sabawi
- Parent: Dr. Mohammad Al Sabawi
- Awards: Young Alumni Achievement Medal, University of Waterloo; Young Entrepreneur Award for 2013, Takreem Awards.; Ranked 195th Most Influential Arab, Arabian Business Magazine (Top 500), 2012.; Named "Accomplished Palestinian", Institute for Middle East Understanding, 2011.; Energy Globe Award Recipient, 2011.; World Top Energy Entrepreneur, Global Post, 2010.; Energy Globe Award Recipient, 2009.
- Website: Khaled Al Sabawi on Facebook

Khaled Al Sabawi (born October 1, 1983) is a Canadian serial-entrepreneur, engineer, impact investor, screenwriter, and executive producer. He is the Founder & CEO of Open Screenplay, Inc; CEO & Vice Chairman of Union Construction (UCI), Co-Founder of TABO Palestine; and Founder & President of MENA Geothermal. The son of Palestinian refugees from Gaza, he received his degree in Computer Engineering from the University of Waterloo in Canada in 2006 and later became the first certified Geothermal Engineer in the Arab Middle East Khaled was named "One of the World's Top Energy Entrepreneurs" by Global Post in 2010, and was ranked the 195th Most Influential Arab by Arabian Business Magazines in their Top 500 Most Influential Arabs ranking for 2012. In 2013, Khaled received the Takreem Award for Young Entrepreneur at their highly publicized awards ceremony in Paris, France. In October 2014, Khaled was featured on the cover of Forbes Middle East with the caption beside his picture reading "Industry of the Impossible" in Arabic along with the a feature article titled "The Good Deed" in English. On November 25, 2014 Khaled received the Young Alumni Achievement Medal from the University of Waterloo’s Faculty of Engineering in Canada, one of the most renowned faculties of engineering in the world. In 2015 Khaled was selected as a Young Global Leader by the World Economic Forum.

As part of MENA Geothermal, a green energy business, Khaled installed the first geothermal systems in Palestine in 2007. MENA Geothermal was a two-time winner of the Energy Globe Award in 2008 and 2011 and has installed the largest geothermal system in the Middle East at the American University of Madaba in Jordan.

While at UCI, one of the largest impact investment real-estate development companies in Palestine, Khaled Co-Founded TABO, Arabic for "title deed," a development project which revolutionized the real-estate market in the West Bank by offering affordable, registered plots of residential land in the West Bank. It is a response to the increasing cost of land purchase in Palestine and also protects land against Israeli annexation through title deed registration. Khaled grew UCI to lead its national real-estate market for years.

On January 15, 2019, Khaled launched Open Screenplay, an online platform and marketplace with a patented technology that services businesses looking for original story concepts or screenplays with a community of storytellers looking to get discovered, learn, collaborate, get paid and produced. Open Screenplay has revolutionized the way businesses create stories for marketing, allowing businesses such as RBC Royal Bank, Canada’s largest bank, to generate hundreds of authentic stories from a diverse community of writers on marketing topics of their choice - at a fraction of the cost compared to using a traditional advertising agency.

In 2010, Khaled gave a speech at the TEDxRamallah Conference, titled "Keeping Palestine Cool: A Different Kind of Underground Movement" went viral on YouTube influencing over 100,000 viewers. In 2018, Khaled gave a second TEDx talk title TABO - Every Palestinian Needs a Title.

== Political views ==
Khaled has spoken about Israel's "campaign of entry denials and visa restrictions directed towards foreign nationals working in Palestine," citing his denial of entry by Israel three times in the span of seven months in 2009. Khaled has also spoken out against the negative impact that the "massive amount of foreign aid that is injected into the Palestinian economy, now totaling 30 percent of the Palestinian GDP" has had on the development of an independent economy. Among other things, he argues foreign aid undermines the Palestinian private sector's ability to recruit educated Palestinian professionals.

== See also ==
- List of University of Waterloo people
