= Manas Kumar Mandal =

Indian neuropsychologist

Dr. Manas Kumar Mandal
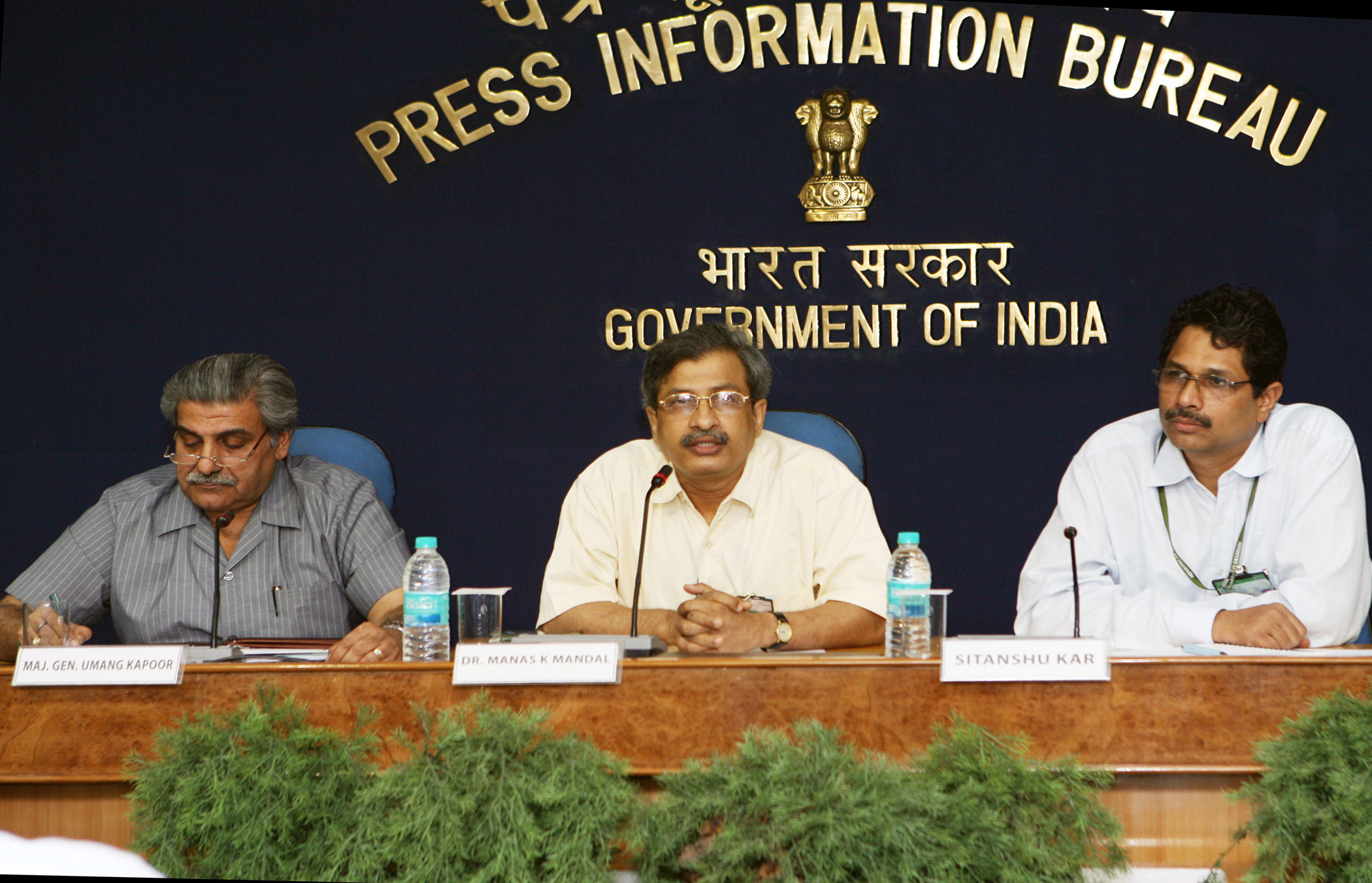
- Education: University of Calcutta
- Scientific career
- Fields: Cognitive Neuropsychology

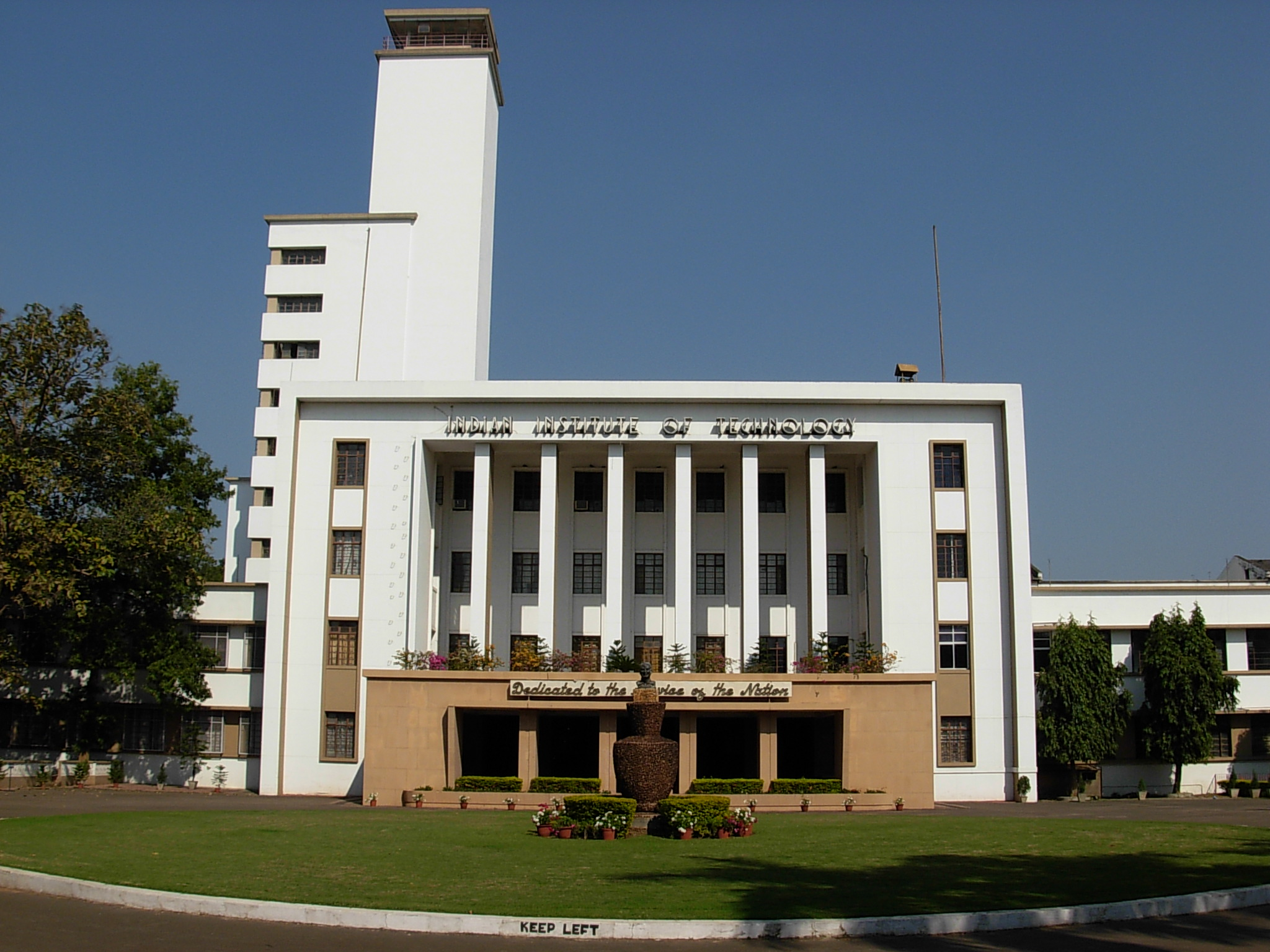
Main building of IIT Kharagpur

Manas K Mandal is a cognitive neuropsychologist serving as the distinguished visiting professor at Indian Institute of Technology – Kharagpur.

== Research areas ==
Mandal specializes in the areas of neuropsychology and cognitive sciences. His research interests areas include hemispheric lateralization and affective architecture of the brain. He has been mentioned in 14 books and over 100 research papers in international and Indian journals of high repute.

== Career ==
Mandal holds a Ph.D. degree from Calcutta University and started his career as lecturer at Banaras Hindu University in 1983. Mandal completed his postdoctoral research at the University of Delaware as a Fulbright Fellow from 1986 to 1987. He also studied at the University of Waterloo as an International Scientific Exchange Awardee and as an Indo-Canadian Shastri Fellow from 1993 to 1994.

Mandal was a professor of psychology at the Indian Institute of Technology-Kharagpur till 2003. He joined the Defence Research and Development Organization (DRDO) in 2004 as the director – Defense Institute of Psychological Research and remained there for nine years before he took over as the chief-controller R&D of Life Sciences. Thereafter Mandal became distinguished scientist and director-general (LS), DRDO. Mandal was also a visiting professor at Kyushu University in Japan in 1997 and from 2010 to 2011; a Fulbright Visiting Lecturer at Harvard University, 2003; and a visiting Fulbright-Nehru professor at the University of Pennsylvania. Currently, he serves as the distinguished visiting professor at Indian Institute of Technology – Kharagpur. He is also an adjunct professor at the National Institute of Advanced Studies, IISc campus, in Bangalore. He is also an honorary professor at Sri Sri University's Faculty of Contemplative and Behavioural Sciences

== Fellowships and awards ==
Mandal has received various research fellowships and awards at national and international levels for his work. In 2005, Mandal and his team were given away 'Agni Award for Excellence in self-reliance' for the contribution towards the development of 'Computerized Pilot Selection System' for Air Force. For his overall contribution to psychological sciences, he was elected as the Fellow of National Association of Psychology in India in 2012; and for his contribution to Military Psychology, he was given away the ‘Technology Leadership Award’ by the Defense Minister of India and the 'Scientist of the Year' award by the prime minister of India in 2006 (DRDO). Some of the other awards he has been given include:

- Indo-Canadian Shastri fellowship
- Natural Sciences & Engineering Research Council of Canada award
- Fulbright fellowship
- Seymour Kety award
- German Academic Exchange (DAAD) fellowship
- Career Award, U.G.C.
- Young Scientist Award, ISCA
- National Association of Medical Sciences Award
- DRDO Spin-off Technology Award
- Fulbright-Nehru Fellow
- Technology Leadership Award

== See also ==
- List of University of Waterloo people
