= Sandra Sabatini =

Canadian writer (born 1959)

Sandra Sabatini (born 21 November 1959) is a Canadian writer.

Born in Guelph, Ontario, Sabatini is a graduate of the doctoral program in English Literature at the University of Waterloo. She also has a master's degree in creative writing from the University of Guelph where she currently teaches.

Her first collection of short stories, The One with the News (2000), a collection of linked stories exploring the impact of Alzheimer's disease on a family, was shortlisted for the McClelland Stewart Writers Trust Journey and for the Upper Canada Writers' Craft Award. Sabatini's second book, Making Babies: Infants in Canadian Fiction (2004), explored how babies are becoming more predominant in contemporary Canadian fiction and developing their own literary identity. Her second collection of short stories, The Dolphins at Sainte-Marie (2006), explores small town living in Southern Ontario and the curiosities of youth and inexperience.

Her latest book, Dante's War, a novel, is about an Italian soldier stationed in Africa during the Second World War. It is said to be the first novel written in English to present the Italian point of view on World War II.

== Bibliography ==
- The One with the News – 2000
- Making Babies: Infants in Canadian Fiction – 2004
- The Dolphins at Sainte-Marie – 2006
- Dante's War – 2009

== See also ==
- List of University of Waterloo people
