= Anne Zeller =

American anthropologist

Anne C. Zeller is a physical anthropologist. She attended the University of Toronto.

Zeller began teaching full-time at the University of Waterloo in the Department of Anthropology in 1982, and spent several years as the Chair or Head of Anthropology after 1993. Zeller also held a series of positions at the University of Alberta, the University of Victoria and the University of Toronto. She retired from teaching in 2009.

== Career ==
Anne Zeller was a professor at the University of Waterloo in the department of anthropology from 1982 to 2010. As well as a primatologist who specialized in the study of macaques. She focused mainly on their behavior, travelling to many places such as Africa, Indonesia, Costa Rica, Texas, Florida, France, Italy, and Japan. Through her Field work she became a filmmaker, documenting the work that she did and what she saw on her trips.

== Filmography ==
- Chimpanzees Today
- Five Species
- Hominid Evolution 1: The Early Stages
- Hominid Evolution 2: The Genus Homo
- Images From the Field: Baboons
- Lemurs of Madagascar
- New World Monkeys
- Primate-Human Interaction
- Primate Patterns II
- Sifakas of Madagascar
- What Do Primatologists Do?

== Select publications ==
=== Journal articles ===
- Zeller, Anne (1 January 1980). "Primate facial gestures: A study of communication". Paper in Linguistics. 13 (4): 565–605. doi:10.1080/08351818009370512. ISSN 0031-1251.
- Zeller, Anne (1982). "Speaking of Clever Apes". Recherches sémiotiques / Semiotic Inquiry. 2 (3): 276–308.
- "Component Patterns in Gesture Formation in Macaca sylvanus of Gibraltar" (PDF). Canadian Review of Physical Anthropology. 4 (2): 35–42. 1985.
- Zeller, A. C. (September 1987). "A Role for Children in Hominid Evolution". Man. 22 (3): 528–557. doi:10.2307/2802504. JSTOR 2802504.
- Zeller, Anne C. (1 January 1990). "Arctic Hysteria in Salem?". Anthropologica. 32 (2): 239–264. JSTOR 25605580.
- Zeller, Anne C. (1 January 1991). "Human Response to Primate Deviance". Anthropologica. 33 (1/2): 39–68. doi:10.2307/25605600. JSTOR 25605600.
- Zeller, Anne (1 January 1992). "Grooming interactions over infants in four species of primate". Visual Anthropology. 5 (1): 63–86. doi:10.1080/08949468.1992.9966578. ISSN 0894-9468.
- Zeller, Anne (March 2001). "Chimpanzee Grooming as Social Custom:Chimpanzee Grooming as Social Custom". American Anthropologist. 103 (1): 194–196. doi:10.1525/aa.2001.103.1.194.
- Zeller, Anne (1 January 2004). "Socioecology or Tradition". Reviews in Anthropology. 33 (1): 19–41. doi:10.1080/713649338. ISSN 0093-8157. S2CID 162297711.

=== Book chapters ===
- Taub, David M.; King, Frederick A. (1986). "Comparison of Component Patterns in Threatening and Friendly Gestures in Macaca sylvanus of Gibraltar". Current perspectives in primate social dynamics. New York: Van Nostrand Reinhold. ISBN 9780442282899.
- Smuts, Barbara B.; Cheney, D.L.; Seyfarth, R.M. (1987). "Communication by Sight and Smell". Primate societies. Chicago: University of Chicago Press. pp. 433–439. ISBN 9780226102405.
- Burton, Frances D. (1992). "Communication in the Social Unit". Social processes and mental abilities in non-human primates : evidences from longitudinal field studies. Lewiston u.a.: Edwin Mellen Press. pp. 61–89. ISBN 9780773495371.
- Roeder, Jean-Jacques; Anderson, James Russell (1990). "The Study of Visual and Vocal Communication". Primates : recherches actuelles. Paris: Masson. ISBN 2225819696.
- Counts, David R.; Counts, Dorothy A. (1991). Coping with the final tragedy : cultural variation in dying and grieving. Amityville, N.Y.: Baywood Pub. Co. ISBN 9780895030818.
- Gardner, R.A.; Chiarelli, Brunetto; Plooij, Frans C., eds. (1994). "Evidence of Structure in Macaque Communication". Ethological roots of culture. Netherlands: Kluwer Academic Publishers. pp. 15–39. ISBN 978-94-010-4433-2.
- "Out of Awareness: Into Perception". Journal of the Steward Anthropological Society. 27 (1–2): 63–73. 2001.
- Mitchell, Robert W. (2002). "Pretending in Monkeys". Pretending and Imagination in Animals and Children. Cambridge University Press. ISBN 9781139439442.
- Fa, John E.; Lindburg, Donald G. (2005). "The Interplay of Kinship Organisation and Facial Communication in the Macaques". Evolution and ecology of macaque societies. Cambridge: Cambridge University Press. ISBN 9780521021715.

== Related filmmakers ==
- Robert Gardner
- Tim Asch

== See also ==
- List of University of Waterloo people
