= Walt Neubrand =

Keeper of the Stanley Cup

Walter Neubrand is one of three men, called the Keepers of the Cup, who keep and maintain the Stanley Cup during its trips around the world.

== Early life ==
Neubrand was born in Toronto, Ontario, in June 1969, where he grew up as a hockey fan. He learned how to play the sport on the frozen Credit River during his childhood. After finishing high school at Port Credit Secondary School, he went on to study at the University of Waterloo where he received an honours degree in Environmental Studies. In 1995, he graduated with a Bachelor of Education degree from the University of Toronto.

== Hockey Hall of Fame ==
After graduating from university, Neubrand worked for the Hockey Hall of Fame in 1995 as a guest services associate. In 1997 Neubrand worked with the Stanley Cup when he was asked to accompany the Cup to Scotty Bowman's home in Buffalo, NY after his team, the Detroit Red Wings, had won the 1997 Stanley Cup Playoffs. Aside from a brief absence in 2000, he has been a Keeper of the Cup since.

In 1999, Neubrand would accompany the cup to Tampa Bay, where the 1999 NHL All-Star Game was taking place. Here he met his wife Laura and they married in South Lyon, Michigan, on August 23, 2003.

The 2000 Neubrand left the Hockey Hall of Fame to become a police officer with the Peel Regional Police. He graduated from the academy, but realized that being a police officer wasn't the right career for him, and returned to his former position.

Neubrand is one of three Keepers of the Cup (the other two being Phil Pritchard and Mike Blot), who share the duties on a rotational basis.

== See also ==
- List of University of Waterloo people
