= James Kaye (disambiguation) =

James Kaye is a British driver.

James Kaye is also the name of:

- James Kaye (cricketer)

== See also ==
- James Kay (disambiguation)
