= James J. Kay =

Canadian physicist

- Born: June 18, 1954
- Died: May 30, 2004 (aged 49)
- Education: McGill University; University of Waterloo
- Scientific career
- Fields: complexity and thermodynamics
- Workplaces: University of Waterloo; University of Guelph

James J. Kay (June 18, 1954 – May 30, 2004) was an ecological scientist and policy-maker. He was a respected physicist best known for his theoretical work on complexity and thermodynamics.

== Biography ==
James Kay held a BS in physics from McGill University and a Ph.D. in systems design engineering from the University of Waterloo. His Ph.D. thesis was entitled Self-Organization in Living Systems. Much of his work relates to integrating thermodynamics into an understanding of self-organization in biological systems. For example, when water in a pot is heated, it will spontaneously form convection currents such as Bénard_cell. This is an example where as the amount of energy available to a system increases, the system self-organizes in order to dissipate energy more efficiently. Kay has examined how similar types of self-organization can occur within living systems at the level of individual organisms and ecosystems. In other words, organisms and ecosystems evolve to use the maximum amount of energy available to them. This has been backed up by studies showing that more mature ecosystems such as old growth forests are cooler (i.e. dissipate more incoming energy) than clear cuts or bare rock that receive the same amount of energy.

Kay was an associate professor of environment and resource studies at the University of Waterloo, with cross-appointments in systems design engineering, geography, management sciences, and the School of Planning. He was also cross-posted to the School of Rural Planning and Development at the University of Guelph.

== Public Policy ==
=== Local ===
Kay was founding chair of the University of Waterloo's Greening the Campus Committee (1990–1996), which is responsible for overseeing the transition to a sustainable campus. He was also a founding member of the City of Kitchener's Environment Committee, which developed a Strategic Plan for the Environment and an ecosystem-based plan for the Huron Natural Area. He sat on the committee which developed the award-winning (Canadian Institute of Planners) bicycle master plan for Kitchener, and was on the city's committee for the transition to a hydrogen economy.

=== Provincial and National ===
Kay served as an adviser to the Ontario Ministry of the Environment and delivered guest lectures to the National Ministry of the Environment. He served on the Long Term Ecosystem Research and Monitoring Panel of the Royal Society of Canada.

=== International ===
Kay was a member of the Royal Swedish Academy of Sciences, Beijer Institute, Working Group on Complex Ecological Economic Systems Modeling. He was also an active member of the United States National Science Foundation Advisory Committee on Environmental Research and Education.

== Publications ==
- Waltner-Toews, D., Kay, J.J., and Lister, N. "The Ecosystem Approach: Complexity, Uncertainty, and Managing for Sustainability" for the Columbia University press series: Complexity in Ecological Systems. New York: Columbia University Press, 2008.
- Manuel-Navarrete, D., Kay J.J., and Dolderman D. 2004. "Ecological integrity discourses: linking ecology with cultural transformation." Human Ecology Review 11.3: 215–229.
- W Murray, T., Kay, J., Waltner-Toews D., Raez-Luna, E.; 2002. "Linking Human and Ecosystem Health on the Amazon Frontier: An Adaptive Ecosystem Approach", Aguirre, A. A., R. S. Ostfeld, C. A. House, G. M. Tabor and M. C. Pearl (eds.), Conservation Medicine: Ecological Health in Practice Oxford University Press. (Chapter 23)
- Waltner-Toews D., Kay, J., 2002. "An Ecosystem Approach to Health", LEISA, 18:1, March 2002.
- Kay, J., 2002, "On Complexity Theory, Exergy and Industrial Ecology: Some Implications for Construction Ecology" in Kibert, C., Sendzimir, J. (eds), Guy, B., Construction Ecology: Nature as a Basis for Green Buildings, Spon Press, pp. 72–107.
- Boyle, M., Kay. J., and Pond, B., 2001. Monitoring in Support of Policy: an Adaptive Ecosystem Approach, in Munn, T., (editor in chief), Vol.4 Encyclopedia of Global Environmental Change, London, John Wiley and Son. pp. 116–137.
- Regier, H.A., Kay, J.J., 2001. "Phase Shifts Or Flip-Flops In Complex Systems", in Munn, R., editor in chief. Vol. 5, Encyclopedia of global environmental change. London: Wiley; 2001; pp. 422–429.
- Kay, J, 2001. "Ecosystems, Science and Sustainability", in Ulgiati, S., Brown, M.T., Giampietro, M., Herendeen, R., Mayumi, K., (eds) Proceedings of the international workshop: Advances in Energy Studies: exploring supplies, constraints and strategies, Porto Venere, Italy, 23–27 May 2000 pp. 319–328
- Kay, J, Allen, T., Fraser, R., Luvall, J., Ulanowicz, R., 2001. "Can we use energy based indicators to characterize and measure the status of ecosystems, human, disturbed and natural?" in Ulgiati, S., Brown, M.T., Giampietro, M., Herendeen, R., Mayumi, K., (eds) Proceedings of the international workshop: Advances in Energy Studies: exploring supplies, constraints and strategies, Porto Venere, Italy, 23–27 May 2000 pp 121–133.
- Kay. J., Regier, H., 2000. "Uncertainty, Complexity, And Ecological Integrity: Insights from an Ecosystem Approach", in P. Crabbe, A. Holland, L. Ryszkowski and L. Westra (eds), Implementing Ecological Integrity: Restoring Regional and Global Environmental and Human Health, Kluwer, NATO Science Series, Environmental Security pp. 121–156.
- Kay. J. 2000. "Ecosystems as Self-organizing Holarchic Open Systems : Narratives and the Second Law of Thermodynamics" in Sven Erik Jorgensen, Felix Muller (eds), Handbook of Ecosystems Theories and Management, CRC Press – Lewis Publishers. pp 135–160
- Waltner-Toews, D., Murray, T., Kay, J., Gitau, T., Raez-Luna, E., McDermot, J., 2000, "One Assumption, Two Observations, Some Guiding Questions and a Process for the Investigation and Practice of Agroecosystem Health", in Jabbar, M.A., Peden, D.G., Saleem, M., Li Pub, H. (eds), Agro-ecosystems, natural resources management and human health related research in East Africa: Proceedings of an IDRC-ILRI international workshop held at ILRI, Addis Ababa, Ethiopia, 11–15 May 1998. Published by International Livestock Research Institute, Nairobi. pp. 7–14
- Lister, N., Kay, J.J., 1999, "Celebrating Diversity: Adaptive Planning and Biodiversity Conservation", in S. Bocking (ed), Biodiversity in Canada: An Introduction to Environmental Studies, Broadview Press. pp. 189–218.
- Kay. J., Regier, H., Boyle, M. and Francis, G. 1999. "An Ecosystem Approach for Sustainability: Addressing the Challenge of Complexity" Futures Vol 31, #7, Sept. 1999, pp. 721–742.
- Kay, J.J., Foster, J., 1999, "About Teaching Systems Thinking" in Savage, G., Roe, P. (eds), Proceedings of the HKK conference, 14–16 June 1999, University of Waterloo, Ontario, pp. 165–172
- Kay. J., Regier, H., 1999. "An Ecosystem Approach to Erie's Ecology" in M. Munawar, T.Edsall, I.F. Munawar, (eds), International Symposium. The State of Lake Erie (SOLE) - Past, Present and Future. A tribute to Drs. Joe Leach & Henry Regier, Backhuys Academic Publishers, Netherlands, pp. 511–533
- Regier, H.A., Kay, J.J., 1996 "An Heuristic Model of Transformations of the Aquatic Ecosystems of the Great Lakes-St. Lawrence River Basin", Journal of Aquatic Ecosystem Health, Vol. 5: pp. 3–21
- Schneider, E.D, Kay, J.J., 1995, "Order from Disorder: The Thermodynamics of Complexity in Biology", in Michael P. Murphy, Luke A.J. O'Neill (ed), "What is Life: The Next Fifty Years. Reflections on the Future of Biology", Cambridge University Press, pp. 161–172
- Schneider, E.D, Kay, J.J., 1994 "Complexity and Thermodynamics: Towards a New Ecology", Futures 24 (6) pp. 626–647, August 1994
- Kay, J, Schneider, E.D,. 1994, "Embracing Complexity, The Challenge of the Ecosystem Approach", Alternatives Vol 20 No.3 pp. 32– 38
- Schneider, E.D, Kay, J.J., 1994, "Life as a Manifestation of the Second Law of Thermodynamics", Mathematical and Computer Modelling, Vol 19, No. 6-8, pp. 25–48. Also available in pdf format. Included in Readings in Ecology (Oxford University Press, 1999).
- Tobias, T., Kay, J.J., 1994, "The Bush Harvest in the Northern Village of Pinehouse" Arctic Vol 47, No. 3. pp. 207–221.
- Kay, J.J., 1993, "On the Nature of Ecological Integrity: Some Closing Comments" in S. Woodley, J. Kay, G. Francis (Eds.), 1993. Ecological Integrity and the Management of Ecosystems, St. Lucie Press, Delray, Florida, pp. 201–212.
- Schneider, E.D, Kay, J.J., 1993, "Exergy Degradation, Thermodynamics, and the Development of Ecosystems" in Tsatsaronis G., Szargut, J., Kolenda, Z., Ziebik, Z.,(eds) Energy, Systems, and Ecology, Volume 1, Proceedings of ENSEC' 93, July 5–9 Cracow, Poland., pp. 33–42.
- Kay, J.J., Schneider, E.D., 1992. "Thermodynamics and Measures of Ecosystem Integrity" in Ecological Indicators, Volume 1, D.H. McKenzie, D.E. Hyatt, V.J. Mc Donald (eds.), Proceedings of the International Symposium on Ecological Indicators, Fort Lauderdale, Florida, Elsevier, pp. 159–182.
- Kay, J.J., 1991. "A Non-equilibrium Thermodynamic Framework for Discussing Ecosystem Integrity", Environmental Management, Vol 15, No.4, pp. 483–495
- Kay, J.J., L. Graham, R.E., Ulanowicz. 1989. "A Detailed Guide to Network Analysis" in Network Analysis in Marine Ecology: Methods and Applications, F. Wulff, J. Field, K. Mann (Eds.), pp. 15–61, Springer-Verlag.

== See also ==
- List of University of Waterloo people
