= Tony Knowles (chemist) =

Dr. Tony Knowles was the President of the British Columbia Institute of Technology (BCIT). A chemist by training, Knowles has been awarded the Queen's Golden Jubilee Medal.

Knowles has a BSc and PhD in physical chemistry from the University of Waterloo. Following a variety of private sector and academic posts he was appointed President of BCIT in 2000 and stepped down in May 2007.

== See also ==
- List of University of Waterloo people
