= Mohammad H. Ansari =

Iranian physicist

Mohammad Ansari
- Education: PhD in Theoretical Physics, University of Waterloo
- Known for: Quantum physics
- Awards: John Brodie Prize Perimeter Institute for Theoretical Physics
- Scientific career
- Fields: Physics
- Doctoral advisor: Lee Smolin

Mohammad Ansari is a theoretical physicist expert in quantum physics. In 2006, he proposed that quantum gravitational effects can be seen on top of Hawking radiation of black hole. He was the first winner of the John Brodie prize from the Perimeter Institute for Theoretical Physics.

In 2015, Ansari and Nazarov proposed a quantum version of the fluctuation-dissipation theorem in quantum heat engines that is an exact correspondence between Rényi entropy and Full Counting Statistics (FCS) of energy transfers.

Ansari has recently reported a novel symmetry in quantum computation that helps to liberate quantum bits from fundamental parasitic interactions. In 2020, experimenters from IBM Watson Research Center verified the symmetry and eliminated the redundant interactions between qubits.

== See also ==
- List of University of Waterloo people
