= David Clausi =

Canadian design engineer

- Education: University of Waterloo
- Occupation: Design engineer

David Clausi is a Canadian design engineer. He is the University Research Chair Professor in the department of systems design engineering at the University of Waterloo.

In 2026, Clausi was named a fellow of the Institute of Electrical and Electronics Engineers, "for contributions to computer vision and machine learning for automated interpretation of remote sensing imagery".
