= James Downey (academic) =

Canadian academic (1939–2022)

James Downey OC
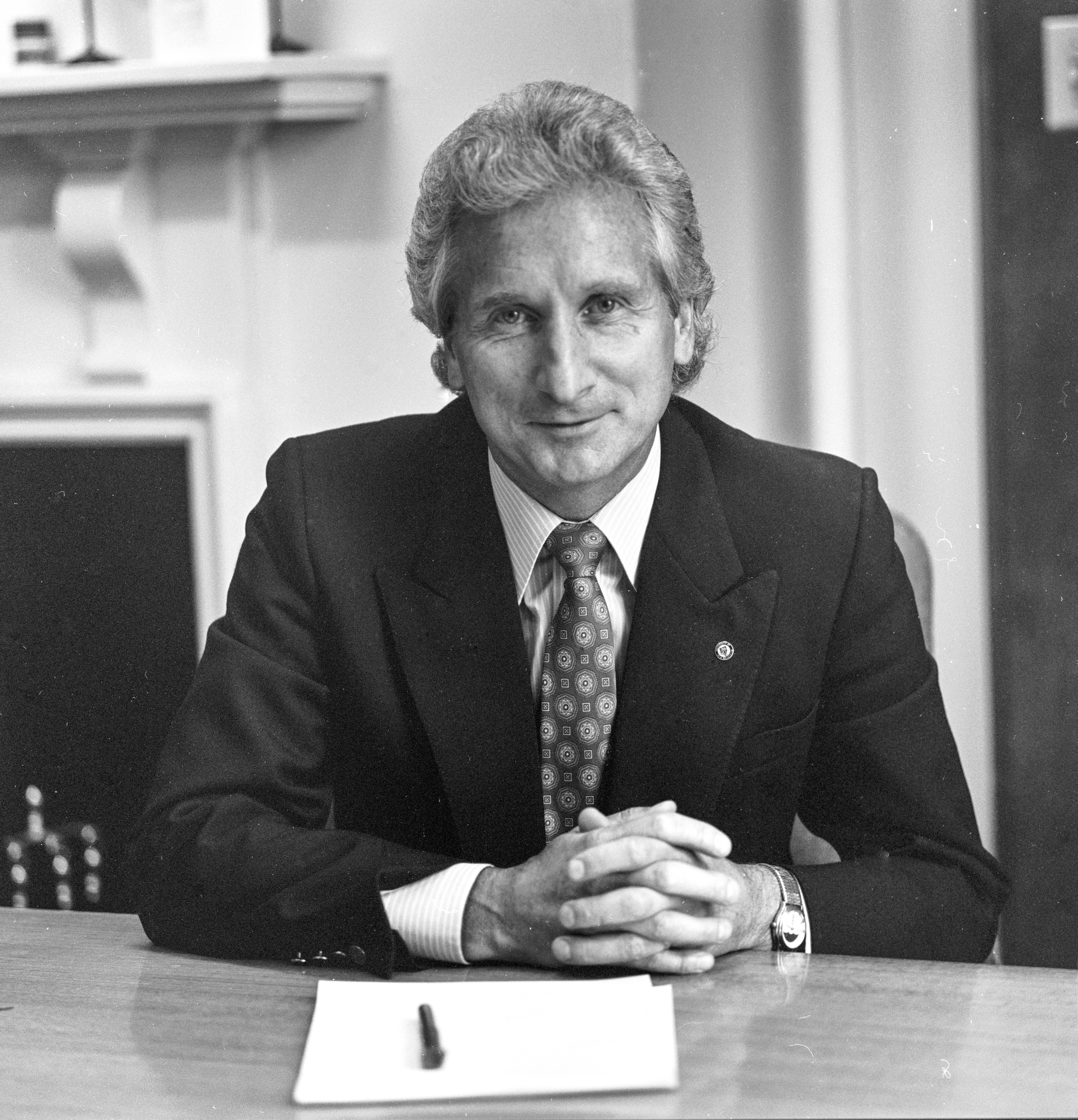
- Downey in 1989
- Born: April 20, 1939; Winterton, Newfoundland
- Died: March 23, 2022 (aged 82); Waterloo, Ontario
- Occupation: Academic
- Spouse: Laura Downey (married 1964)
- Children: 2
- Parents: Ernest Downey (father); Mimi Downey (mother)
- Awards: Officer of the Order of Canada

James Downey OC (April 20, 1939 – March 23, 2022) was a Canadian academic.

== Biography ==
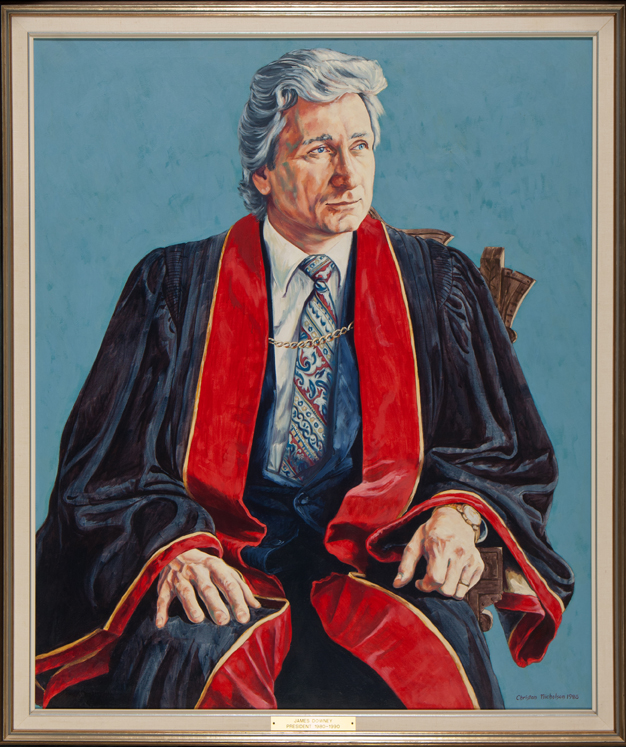
Portrait of Dr. James Downey by Christian Nicholson

Born in Winterton, Newfoundland, Downey was a graduate of Memorial University of Newfoundland and of the University of London where, as a Rothermere Fellow, he earned a PhD in English literature in 1966.

At Carleton University, where he began his career, he held a series of academic and administrative posts, including chairman of the English department, dean of the faculty of arts, vice-president (academic) and interim president for the first five months of 1979.

From 1980 to 1990 he was President of the University of New Brunswick. During that period he also served terms as president of the Canadian Bureau for International Education, chairman of the Association of Atlantic Universities and chairman of the Corporate-Higher Education Forum.

From 1990 to 1993 he was special advisor to the Premier of New Brunswick and co-chairman of the New Brunswick Commission on Excellence in Education, which published two reports that guided educational reform in that province.

Downey was president of the University of Waterloo from 1993 to 1999, during which time he also served terms as chairman of the Council of Ontario Universities and Chair of the Association of Commonwealth Universities.

His publications include The Eighteenth Century Pulpit (Oxford University Press, 1969), Fearful Joy (McGill-Queens University Press, 1973), Schools For A New Century and To Live and Learn (reports of the New Brunswick Commission on Excellence in Education, 1992, 1993), Innovation: Essays by Leading Canadian Researchers, edited with Lois Claxton (Key Porter Books, 2002), and Lord Beaverbrook and the Kennedys (University of New Brunswick, 2012).

Among his awards are honorary degrees from six Canadian and two American universities. In 2000 he was the recipient of the Association of Commonwealth Universities of the Symons Medal for outstanding service to higher education in the Commonwealth, and in 2003 he received the David C. Smith Award from the Council of Ontario Universities for his contributions to universities and public policy in Canada.

Downey met Laura Parsons at university and the couple married in 1964. They would go on to have two children, Sarah and Geoffrey.

In an interview with The Record Valerie Hill writes: "He had a tremendous impact on Sarah growing up, his daughter said. But that influence wasn’t just about encouraging his children to achieve academically or professionally. Most of all, he wanted his kids to be good people. She remembered when her father was looking over the tax return from her first job. He wasn’t interested in how much she earned but rather how much she donated to charity.“You need to give money,” she recalls him saying."

In 2005, he was appointed Chairman of the Board of Governors of the Royal Military College of Canada.

He was made an Officer of the Order of Canada in 1996.

Downey died in Waterloo, Ontario on March 23, 2022, at the age of 82.

== See also ==
- List of University of Waterloo people
