= Organizational hologram =

Organizational method theory

Organizational hologram is the method of organization theories described in the book The Organizational Hologram: The Effective Management of Organizational Change (1991), by Kenneth D. Mackenzie.

The method claims that if an organization had twelve holonomic processes working, it would have the property of achieving and maintaining dynamic congruency and would be simultaneously efficient and adaptable.

Holonomic theory states that an organization has 12 management processes (HPs) that drive performance on six desired organizational characteristics (DOCs).

== Desired organizational characteristics ==
- DOC-1 Clarity of Direction
- DOC-2 Clarity of Structures
- DOC-3 Clarity of Measurement
- DOC-4 Successful Goal Achievement
- DOC-5 Results Oriented Problem Solving
- DOC-6 Associates Are Assets and Resources

== Holonomic processes ==
- HP-1 Establishing and Maintaining Clear Strategic Direction
- HP-2 Defining and Updating the Organizational Logic
- HP-3 Ensuring Best Decision Making
- HP-4 Adapting to Ensure Position Clarity
- HP-5 Ensuring Systematic Planning that is Workable, Involved, and Understood
- HP-6 Integrating Employee Selection, Development, and Flow with the Strategic Direction
- HP-7 Nurturing and Rewarding Opportunistic and Innovative Problem Solving
- HP-8 Ensuring Healthy Problem Solving Throughout the Organization
- HP-9 Setting Tough and Realistic Performance Standards
- HP-10 Operating Equitable and Effective Rewards Systems
- HP-11 Ensuring Compatibility of Interests
- HP-12 Encouraging and Rewarding Ethical Behavior for All Associates

== Sources ==
- Glossary for the Holonomic Model
