= Burt Matthews =

Canadian soil scientist and academic administrator (1926-2004)

- Born: Burton Clare Matthews; December 16, 1926; Kerwood, Ontario
- Died: January 2, 2004 (aged 77); Waterloo, Ontario
- Education: University of Toronto B.S.A. University of Missouri A.M. Cornell University Ph.D.
- Occupations: soil scientist and academic administrator
- Known for: President of the University of Waterloo and University of Guelph

Burton Clare Matthews (December 16, 1926 – January 2, 2004) was a Canadian soil scientist and an academic administrator. He was President of the University of Waterloo from 1970 to 1981 and the University of Guelph from 1983 to 1988.

== Early life ==
Born in Kerwood, Middlesex County, Ontario, Matthews received a B.S.A. from the University of Toronto in 1947, a A.M. from the University of Missouri in 1948, and a Ph.D. from Cornell University in 1952. From 1961 to 1962, he studied at Oxford University as a Nuffield Foundation Post-Doctorate Fellow.

== Academic career ==
Matthews began his academic career at the Ontario Agricultural College as an assistant professor of soil science in 1952 becoming an associate professor in 1956 and a full professor in 1958. From 1962 to 1966, he was the head of the department of soil science.

In 1966, he was appointed vice-president (Academic) at the University of Guelph. In 1970, he was appointed president and Vice-Chancellor of the University of Waterloo and was reappointed for a second six-year term in 1975. From 1982 to 1984, he was the chairman of the Ontario Council of University Affairs. From 1983 to 1988, he was president and Vice-Chancellor of the University of Guelph.

== Later life ==
In 1987, Matthews was appointed to the board of trustees of the International Center for the Improvement of Maize and Wheat and became its chair in 1990. He was a director of a number of corporations, including Mutual Life of Canada, Mutual Trust, Campbell Soup Company Ltd., John Wiley and Sons (Canada), as well as serving as president of the Canadian Society of Soil Science. He was a member of Sigma Xi: The Scientific Research Society, a Freemason, and an Anglican.

He died in Waterloo, Ontario in 2004 of natural causes.

== See also ==
- List of University of Waterloo people
