= Phil Pritchard (ice hockey) =

Hockey Hall of Fame curator

- Born: 1960 or 1961 (age 64–65); Oakville, Ontario, Canada
- Education: Business Accounting (Sheridan College); Sport administration
- Title: Vice-president of the Hockey Hall of Fame; Curator of the Hockey Hall of Fame; Keeper of the Cup (informal title)
- Spouse: Diane
- Children: 3

Phil Pritchard (b. 1960 or 1961) is the current vice-president of the Resource Centre and curator of the Hockey Hall of Fame. His duties include being the "Keeper of the Cup".

== Biography ==
Phil Pritchard was born in 1960 or 1961 in Oakville, Ontario to British-born parents. He started playing ice hockey through minor ice hockey (Bantam) at 13 years old, although he had been playing road hockey for years.

Pritchard graduated in business accounting at the Pilon School of Business of Sheridan College in 1984. He majored in sports administration and interned at the Ontario Hockey League. This led him to join the Hockey Hall of Fame on 27 September 1988. Since his first week on the job, he was tasked with travelling with the Stanley Cup.

Pritchard is the Keeper of the Cup. He takes care of the Stanley Cup's safety and integrity and travels with it. Since 1994 Pritchard walks the Stanley Cup out to the ice to be presented to the champions. He also oversees the process of engraving the winner's names unto the Cup. Pritchard travels over 150 days a year as the Cup is given to each of the winning team's player for one day. By 2020, he had traveled to 24 countries with the Stanley Cup and to more than 35 countries in total.

Pritchard has served on the Board of Directors for the International Sports Heritage Association (ISHA) and the Canadian Association of Sport Heritage (C.A.S.H). He sits on the Lester Patrick Award committee and the Ice Hockey Federation's Historical Committee.

He was featured in the "priceless" Mastercard, the Discover Peggy, the Honda Fit and Enterprise commercials, and was in multiple television shows and specials promoting the Stanley Cup.

He was inducted in the Sheridan College Hall of Fame in 2006 and received the ISHA's highest award, the Schroeder Award, in 2009.

Pritchard offers a History of Hockey Course with Sports Management Worldwide.

Pritchard has a wife, Diane, and three children. He lives in Burlington, Ontario. There, he is involved in Oldtimers hockey, minor sport, charities and fundraisers. He is also an ex-member of the Selection Committee for the Sports Hall of Fame of the town.
