= VPA =

VPA may refer to:

== Companies and organizations ==
- Danube Wings (ICAO airline code), a former Slovakia-based airline
- Vermont Principals' Association, governing body of Vermont's high school athletics
- Volunteer Pilots Association, American public benefit flying group
- Vietnam People's Army, official name of the armed forces of the Socialist Republic of Vietnam

== Science and technology ==
- Valproic acid, chemical compound that has found clinical use as an anticonvulsant and mood-stabilizing drug
- Virtual Payment Address, a type of ID in the Unified Payments Interface
- Virtual personal assistant, a software agent
- Visibly pushdown automaton, an automaton model in computer science

== Other uses ==
- Voluntary Partnership Agreement, trade agreement between the EU and some timber producing countries
