= Forest Law Enforcement and Governance Program =

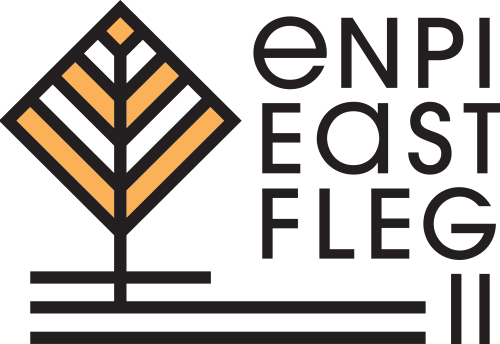
FLEG II Program logotype

European Neighborhood and Partnership Instrument Forest Law Enforcement and Governance Program (ENPI FLEG) is a program that aims to improve forest law enforcement and governance in 7 countries: Armenia, Azerbaijan, Belarus, Georgia, Moldova, Russia, and Ukraine. It comprises two parts, FLEG I, implemented in 2008–12, and FLEG II, implemented in 2012–16. The program is implemented by the World Bank, IUCN, and WWF. The Program is mostly funded by European Commission through the European Neighbourhood and Partnership Instrument; some activities are funded by the Austrian Development Cooperation. The program has been developed in response to the growing problem of illegal forest activities in the participating countries. The Program aims to:

- At the regional level, implement the St. Petersburg FLEG Ministerial Declaration, which was signed at the Europe and North Asia Ministerial Conference on Forest Law Enforcement and Governance in St. Petersburg, Russia, in 2005, by 44 governments from Europe and North Asia region. In the Declaration, the governments expressed their commitment to take action to address illegal logging and associated forest crimes.
- At the national level, review or revise forest sector policies and legal and administrative structures; improve knowledge of and support for sustainable forest management and good forest governance (including the impact of EU timber regulation) in the participating countries;
- At the local (sub-national) level, test and demonstrate best practices for sustainable forest management and the feasibility of improved forest governance practices on a pilot basis in all participating countries.

Through legislative changes, stakeholder involvement, education and training, and other activities that strengthen governance and anti-corruption measures, the ENPI FLEG Program has created an approach that engages and links governments with the business, academic, civil society, and rural communities.

== See also ==
- EU FLEGT Action Plan
- Illegal logging
