= TFF =

TFF may stand for:

== Festivals ==
- Taipei Film Festival, an annual film festival in Taipei, Taiwan
- Taormina Film Fest, international film festival in Taormina
- Telluride Film Festival, an annual film festival in Telluride, Colorado, USA
- TFF Rudolstadt, a music festival
- Torino Film Festival, international film festival in Turin
- Tribeca Film Festival, an annual event in New York City, USA

== Sports ==
- Tajikistan Football Federation
- Tanzania Football Federation
- Trelleborgs FF, a Swedish football club
- Turkish Football Federation

== Others ==
- Tangential Flow Filtration, a technique in biochemistry
- Telematics Freedom Foundation, a non-profit organization based in Rome, Italy
- Tears for Fears, an English band
- Texas Furry Fiesta, an annual furry convention held in Dallas, Texas, USA

== See also ==
- Time to first fix (TTFF), the time it takes the receiver to calculate a valid GPS position for navigation after it has been switched on
- TTF (disambiguation)
