= EU FLEGT Action Plan =

The European Union Forest Law Enforcement, Governance and Trade Action Plan (or EU FLEGT Action Plan) is a European Union initiative to address illegal logging and the social, economic and environmental harm it causes. The EU adopted the Action Plan in 2003. The plan includes activities in the EU and in tropical countries that export timber and timber products to the EU. These measures include a regulation that prohibits EU businesses from importing or trading illegal timber, and bilateral trade agreements with timber-exporting countries. Much of the FLEGT Action Plan focuses on promoting trade in legal timber products and creating disincentives for trade in illegal products. However, the Action Plan's measures go further by addressing aspects of poor governance that enable illegal logging to persist.

== Measures ==
The EU FLEGT Action Plan envisages action in seven areas:

- Use of legislation
- Promoting legal trade
- Support to timber-exporting countries
- Financing and investment safeguards
- Support to private-sector initiatives
- Public procurement policies
- Action to address conflict timber

== Progress ==
=== EU Timber Regulation ===
As envisaged in the EU FLEGT Action Plan, in 2003, the EU adopted new legislation called the EU Timber Regulation. The regulation requires timber importers and traders in the EU to trade only in legal timber and adopt due diligence procedures to ensure their supply chains are legal. It requires EU member states to have legislation, procedures and penalties in place to enforce the regulation. By July 2015, 24 of the 28 EU member states had implemented the EU Timber Regulation. The EC has issued pre-infringement notices against the remaining four countries (Greece, Hungary, Romania and Spain). On 21 October 2015, WWF filed a complaint at the Federal Forest Office in Vienna against Austrian company Holzindustrie Schweighofer for alleged violations of the European Union Timber Regulation.

=== Voluntary Partnership Agreements (VPAs) ===
Under the FLEGT Action Plan, in 2005, the EU adopted the FLEGT Regulation. The FLEGT Regulation empowers the European Commission to negotiate bilateral trade deals called Voluntary Partnership Agreements with timber-exporting countries. Under a VPA, the partner country agrees to export only legal timber products to the EU, while the EU agrees to give verified legal ('FLEGT-licensed) timber products automatic access to the EU market. VPAs are also intended to strengthen forest governance in timber-exporting countries by improving transparency, accountability and stakeholder participation. The core of each VPA is the description of a timber legality assurance system the partner country will implement to verify the legality of timber products and issue verified legal products with a FLEGT licence.

As of June 2015, six countries were implementing VPAs they have ratified with the EU (Cameroon, Central African Republic, Ghana, Liberia, Indonesia, Republic of the Congo) and nine more countries were negotiating Voluntary Partnership Agreements with the EU (Côte d'Ivoire, Democratic Republic of the Congo, Gabon, Guyana, Honduras, Laos, Malaysia, Thailand, Vietnam). Together these 15 countries supply 80 percent of the EU's tropical timber.

On 21 April 2016, the presidents of Indonesia, the European Commission and the European Council confirmed that Indonesia had met the final major requirement of its VPA and was on course to become the world's first country to issue 'FLEGT' licences. As of 15 November 2016, Indonesia is issuing these licences, i.e. only timber that is FLEGT licensed can enter the EU.

In August 2025, Ghana became the first African country and the second globally after Indonesia to issue a FLEGT license.

This 'milestone' came against a backdrop in which the European Commission announced plans to unilaterally terminate two of its African VPAs, in Cameroon and Liberia, and move towards looser, nonbinding trade arrangements – a response, argued science writer and author Fred Pearce, to “a political climate in which the EU appears to be retreating from many of its commitments to protect nature.”

Liberia’s former President Ellen Johnson Sirleaf warned that axing her country’s VPA would seriously undermine its efforts to end illegal logging. Writing in The Guardian, Johnson Sirleaf said that the VPA had been “an important signal that Liberia was serious about gaining control over logging… This agreement was one of the first critical steps implemented by my government.” She added that the EU’s move to cancel the agreement threatened a key segment of Liberia’s economy.

== Perspectives ==
Criticisms of the FLEGT Action Plan include the considerable amount of time and resources it takes to negotiate a Voluntary Partnership Agreement and then implement a FLEGT licensing programme. Supporters of the FLEGT Action Plan say the time taken to deliver FLEGT licences indicates the rigour and credibility of the process. For instance, Saskia Ozinga of the campaigning organisation FERN described the FLEGT Action Plan as "the EU's best-ever policy on tropical forests, since it's the first scheme of its kind to address the root causes of illegal logging", and gave evidence of improved governance in Ghana, Liberia and Vietnam.

Anand Punja of the UK Timber Trade Federation said the Action Plan "has strongly help create a fairer and more partnership approach to sourcing than before. UK Importers are now much more likely to invest in their supply chains and work in partnership to help their suppliers, some of whom are smaller businesses, to put into place the right procedures and practices to ensure a better approach to forest and timber supply chain management."

Timber trade analyst Rupert Oliver said: "From what I've seen of FLEGT processes in Ghana, Liberia and Indonesia, they have succeeded in bringing groups together who for decades have been at loggerheads and including those who were excluded in the past. There is a strong sense of progress and direction which has often been lacking in other policy initiatives. More importantly they are succeeding in building consensus on key issues in the forest sector beyond what has actually been achieved in many industrialised nations."

== European Court of Auditors report ==
On 22 October 2015, the European Court of Auditors issued a report that was critical of the European Commission's management of the FLEGT Action Plan. The report included a detailed response and rebuttal from the European Commission.

== Independent evaluation of the EU FLEGT Action Plan ==
In July 2014, the European Commission initiated an independent evaluation of the implementation of the EU FLEGT Action Plan. The evaluation team was formed by independent experts from the TEREA – Terre Environnement Aménagement consultancy. The report of the independent evaluation, published on 4 May 2016, confirmed that the EU FLEGT Action Plan is a relevant and innovative response to the challenge of illegal logging and that the Action Plan had improved forest governance in all target countries.

== Related initiatives ==
Since the EU adopted the FLEGT Action Plan, other markets have taken steps to prevent trade in illegal timber products. These include:

- In the United States, the 2008 amendment to the Lacey Act
- In Australia, the Illegal Logging Prohibition Act of 2014

== See also ==
- Forest Law Enforcement and Governance Program
- Illegal logging
