= Fleg =

Fleg or FLEG may refer to:

- Edmond Fleg, a Jewish French writer and intellectual
- Fleg (cartoonist) (1963–2025), Canadian editorial cartoonist
- Belfast City Hall flag protests, derived from the pronunciation of “flag” in a strong Belfast accent
- Fédération Libanaise des Eclaireuses et des Guides, also known by the acronym FLEG
- Forest Law Enforcement and Governance Program (FLEG), a forest management program
