= National Timber Group =

UK timber company

National Timber Group (NTG) is one of the largest independent timber distribution and processing groups in the UK. The group has 60 processing and branch/distribution sites across the UK providing nationwide coverage, and employs at least 1450 people.

On 14 November 2025, each of NTG’s business entities filed a notice of intention to enter administration, with leadership citing “difficult trading conditions” facing the UK timber sector. NTG stated that as well as implementing cost saving measures, they were looking for additional sources of funding and were considering selling the business, either in part or in whole. They later confirmed they were in talks with a prospective buyer to sell off a large part of the business. On 26 November 2025, NTG appointed administrators. 13 out of their 47 branches were shut down effective immediately, with 561 of their 1,150 strong workforce made redundant.

== Formation ==
The group was formed in 2018 by specialist private equity investment firm Cairngorm Capital through the acquisition of Thornbridge, NYTimber, Rembrand and Arnold Laver. The CEO is Scott Cairns.

NTG acquired Scotia Roofing & Building Supplies and Glow Insulation - both Rembrand subsidiary companies - in June 2019, the assets of Cotswold Manufacturing in November 2019, independent timber merchant Hymor Timber in February 2021, and Orchard Timber Products in November 2021. In September 2022 SV Timber was acquired.

Four new brands - National Timber Systems, Timberworld.co.uk, Intelligent Door Solutions and Alco Timber - have been developed within the group.

Through the companies, NTG's customer base includes carpenters and joiners, housebuilders and building contractors. It is a supplier to large-scale infrastructure projects.

Group turnover is over £350 million. They have sites from the north of Scotland to London and the south west of England, providing customers with high quality timber, panel, decorative surfaces and engineered wood products supported by comprehensive timber knowledge and expertise.

NTG is a member of the Timber Trade Federation and is listed on Companies House.

== Locations ==
1. Aberdeen
2. Alfreton
3. Ayr
4. Birmingham
5. Borehamwood
6. Bradford
7. Bristol
8. Brompton on Swale
9. Cannock
10. Cambridge
11. Coventry
12. Croydon
13. Dalbeattie
14. Darlington
15. Dumbarton
16. Dumfries
17. Dundee
18. Edinburgh
19. Elgin
20. Forfar
21. Glasgow
22. Glenrothes
23. Grangemouth
24. Hebburn, Newcastle
25. Ilkeston
26. Inverness
27. Inverurie
28. Irvine
29. Kidderminster
30. Kingston upon Hull
31. Leeds
32. Leicester
33. Livingston
34. Manchester
35. Middlesbrough
36. Milton Keynes
37. Motherwell
38. Newton Stewart
39. North Shields
40. Northallerton
41. Oban
42. Oldbury
43. Peterborough
44. Rainham, Kent
45. Reading
46. Richmond, North Yorkshire
47. Sheffield
48. Selkirk
49. Skye
50. Stirling
51. Stoke-on-Trent
52. Sunderland
53. Thornaby
54. Thurso
