= TTF =

TTF may refer to:

== Science and technology ==
- TESLA Test Facility, testing particle accelerator technology
- Tetrathiafulvalene, an organic compound used in materials science
- Trend type forecast, an aviation weather forecast
- TrueType, an outline font standard originally developed by Apple
- Tumor treating fields (TTFields), a medical therapy to treat cancerous tumors with alternating electric fields

== Music ==
- Ten Thousand Fists, an album by the hard rock band Disturbed
- The Time Frequency, Scottish techno band
- Throw the Fight, an American rock band
- Tunnel Trance Force, a long-running trance mix CD series from Tunnel Records

== Other uses ==
- Custer Airport (IATA code), Monroe, Michigan, US
- Tanker Task Force
- Tax transparent fund, the proposed authorised collective investment scheme structure in the UK
- Timber Trade Federation, federation of British timber industries based in London
- Title Transfer Facility, a virtual trading point for natural gas in the Netherlands
- Titus the Fox, a platform game by Titus Interactive
- Tuvalu Trust Fund, an international fund developed by Tuvalu
- Title Transfer Facility, a natural gas trading hub

== See also ==
- TFF (disambiguation)
- Transcription termination factor, RNA polymerase I (TTF1), a protein that regulates transcription of genes
- Thyroid transcription factor 1 (TTF-1), another protein that regulates transcription of genes
