= EU Regulation on Deforestation-free products =

EU regulation on the prevention of further deforestation

Regulation (EU) 2023/1115
- European Union regulation
- Text with EEA relevance
- Title: Regulation on the making available on the Union market and the export from the Union of certain commodities and products associated with deforestation and forest degradation and repealing Regulation (EU) No 995/2010
- Made by: European Parliament and Council of the European Union
- Journal reference: L150, 9 June 2023, p. 206–247

History
- Date made: 31 May 2023
- Entry into force: 29 June 2023
- Implementation date: 9 December 2024
- Applies from: 29 June 2023 Large Enterprises; ~~30 December 2024~~ (postponed); ~~30 December 2025~~ (postponed) SMEs; ~~30 June 2025~~ (postponed) Large and Medium Enterprises; 30 December 2026 Micro and Small Enterprises; ~~30 June 2026~~ (postponed); 30 June 2027

Other legislation
- Replaces: Timber Regulation 2010

The EU Regulation on Deforestation-free products (Regulation (EU) 2023/1115, abbreviated EUDR) is a European Union regulation on deforestation. The goal of the EUDR is to guarantee that the products European Union (EU) citizens consume do not contribute to deforestation or forest degradation worldwide.

The EUDR is a part of a bigger set of EU policies aimed at fighting climate change and biodiversity reduction, as codified in the European Green Deal. It supersedes the Timber Regulation 2010. It was formally adopted in May 2023 and applies to products placed on the market from 30 December 2024 by medium or big businesses and from 30 June 2025 by small businesses.

The regulation applies to operators who either place on the EU market or export from it, a specific set of commodities or products: palm oil, cattle, soy, coffee, cocoa, timber and rubber, as well as derived products such as beef, furniture, and chocolate. Businesses must carry out due diligence to ensure the products do not come from land that was deforested after 31 December 2020. This includes collecting the geographic coordinates of the plots of land where the commodities were produced. Commodity production must also comply with the laws in the country where they were produced. Operators who cannot provide the required information must refrain from placing their products on the EU market. Those who do anyway face fines up to 4% of their EU turnover.

Reception of the regulation has been mixed. The Economist listed it as one of their top 5 sustainability wins for 2023. The New York Times reported it being hailed as "gold standard in climate policy". Greenpeace called it the EU's "big first step" to end its complicity in the "reckless destruction" of forests. Various exporting countries have protested and warned the EU of severe economic impacts. In the coffee sector, by December 2023 traders were reported to have already started to shift activities away from African countries where many of the world's smallholder farmers reside. Further, the intended effects of the EUDR could potentially be diluted due to trade reallocation effects, particularly when the EU’s market share is relatively small in global trade—for example, in the case of soy.

At the same time, the EUDR’s advocates claimed that even before implementation, it was having a positive impact. In the Financial Times, Nadia Hadad, Executive Director of Indonesian NGO Yayasan MADANI Berkelanjuta, said: “We’ve seen how it [the EUDR] has helped drive legal reforms, increased transparency and improved the traceability of oil palm and other commodities the law covers, as Indonesian institutions have readied themselves for the law’s implementation… Postponing or weakening the law would squander this momentum and send a dangerous message: that EU climate and human rights commitments are negotiable under political pressure.”

In October 2024, Following pressure from global partners and stakeholders about the imminent entry into effect of the regulation the European Commission has proposed a delay of 12 months to the implementation and issued guidance to offer additional support. In a joint statement on 6 November 2024, Nestlé, Michelin and more than 50 other companies have said the EU’s decision to delay its deforestation law is causing uncertainty across business and putting investment at risk.

After this first delay, the obligations were set to apply from 30 December 2025 for large operators and traders, and from 30 June 2026 for micro and small enterprises.

By 26th of November 2025 the EUDR was again postponed and decision of simplification was made. The amending regulation, (EU) 2025/2650, was published in the Official Journal on 23 December 2025. It moved the start dates back by one more year, to 30 December 2026 for large and medium operators and 30 June 2027 for micro and small enterprises. On May 3, 2026, the European Commission published its report on options to simplify the EUDR: the so-called ‘simplification package’ agreed by EU lawmakers the previous December. It proposed removing leather from the EUDR’s rules, but paved the way for the law to be implemented by the end of 2026. Jessika Roswall, EU Environment Commissioner, said that the simplication measures were “expected to reduce annual compliance costs [for the EUDR] by about 75%.”

In a joint statement, COCERAL, FEDIOL and FEFAC, bodies representing European food and feed groups, said that the “simplification package does not improve legal certainty for companies”. In contrast, an earlier report by nonprofit Global Canopy, the Forest 500 Report 2026, said that the EUDR “has already steered business expectations, galvanised investment and driven supply chain action by some of the most influential companies in the deforestation economy.” The report said that in its assessment of 500 companies that play a key role in importing commodities, 313 had taken some steps to address deforestation. Improved satellite data was a key in this, especially being able to track where deforestation has taken place and mapping it to commodity supply chains.

== WTO cases ==
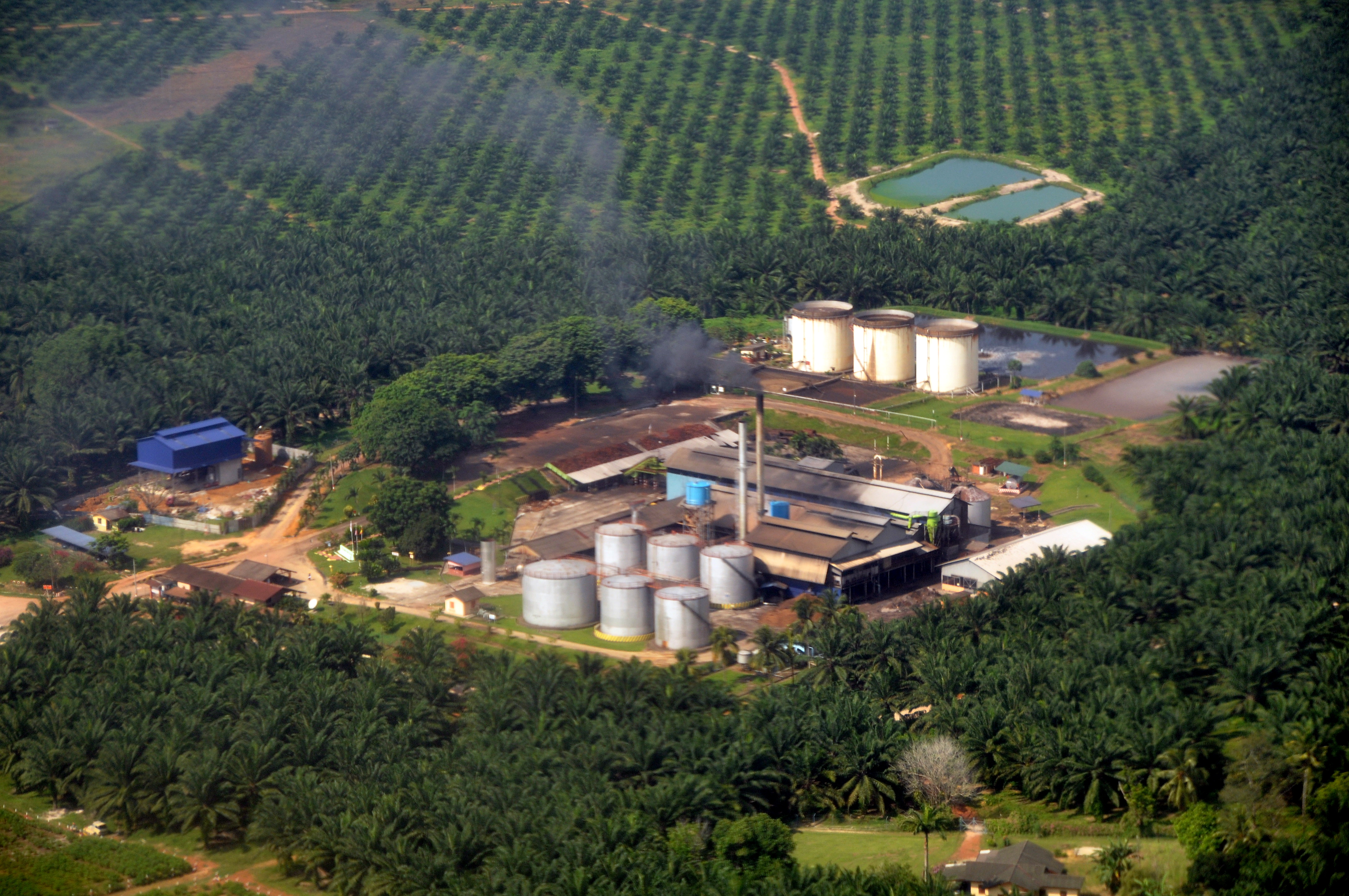
Palm oil plantation in Malaysia

Malaysia and Indonesia filed complaints against the EU at the World Trade Organization (WTO), claiming the EUDR to be discriminatory. The WTO decided Malaysia’s complaint, filed in January 2021, in favour of the EU in March 2024. While the WTO noted that the EU unjustifiably discriminated against Malaysia in the formulation of its policy, it maintained that the EU had the right to introduce rules against the import of crop-based fuels for environmental reasons. The EU thus does not need to withdraw the EUDR, but must adjust it to make it less discriminatory.

Indonesia's complaint, about biodiesel, was filed in August 2023 and retracted one day before the verdict in Malaysia’s case was published. The two cases had been handled by the same WTO panel, and the verdict expected to be revealed at the same time.
