= Compassion flight =

Flight made for benevolent reasons

A compassion flight or public benefit flying mission is an aircraft flight provided in support of humanitarian, charitable, or public benefit purposes. Both the Air Care Alliance and the Federal Aviation Administration in the United States have long referred to these types of flights. Most Compassion Flights are provided by volunteer pilots who are members of public benefit flying organizations, and who donate their time, flying skills, and aircraft for charitable and public service purposes.

Compassion flight are also known as mercy flights or angel flights. These flights are typically offered by charitable organizations or volunteer pilots who donate their time, aircraft, and resources to help patients and their families access medical treatments and facilities that might be otherwise difficult or impossible to reach by conventional means.

== Compassion flights can provide transportation for various reasons, including ==
- Long-distance travel for specialized medical treatment or consultations.
- Transportation for patients who are unable to travel by commercial airlines due to their medical condition or the need for medical equipment.
- Returning patients to their homes after receiving treatment or being discharged from a distant hospital.
- Providing relief during natural disasters, humanitarian crises, or other emergencies when conventional transportation is not available or feasible.

These flights are generally provided free of charge or at a significantly reduced cost for those in need, removing financial barriers to essential medical care. The pilots and organizations involved in compassion flights are dedicated to making a difference in the lives of patients and their families by providing a vital service in times of need.

Some well-known organizations that coordinate compassion flights include Angel Flight, Corporate Angel Network, and Mercy Medical Airlift, among others. These organizations help connect volunteer pilots with individuals and families in need of air transportation for medical reasons.
