= Partecs =

ParTecs, Participatory Technologies, was an international software company specialized in Open Source Software and Free Software solutions based in Rome, Italy.

ParTecs maintained administrative offices in Rome and Brussels and a research and development center in Bangalore, India with over 20 people.

All ParTecs activities and areas of expertise have been incorporated by the Telematics Freedom Foundation since January 2007.

== Products ==
ParTecs' flagship product was the PARTECS Platform from 2001 to 2006, basically a Political Social Networking platform for 2-way communication that enabled members or officials of large multi-language organizations to complement their regular face-to-face meetings, with effective participation in formal and informal deliberative processes via Internet, Email, Mail-in and Fax-in forms. Several pieces and documentation of the platform are still accessible on the web.

The PARTECS platform was presented at the World Summit on the Information Society in 2005, as a result of a partnership with UNESCO.

It has also released many Open Source components for Content Management System (CMS) webmasters to best manage and integrate their sites:

- PloneSkype: Provides Skype presence information inside a Plone portal.
- PloneCaptcha: Helps prevent plone web sites from being abused by spam robots.
- PloneInvite: A tool for plone portal members to invite new users to register into the portal.
- TestableEmailer: Enables you to write automated tests for emailing functionality.
- DateBox: Widget that will allow users to enter dates in a variety of different ways.
- MultiFile: Widget that will allow users to upload multiple files from the same screen. It was forked and is currently available in the Python Package Index (PyPI).

== Licensing ==
ParTecs also tried to promote the PPL (ParTecs Public License), an Open source license which introduced a "delay" period of 12 months before the code becoming fully GPL'ed, as a way to incentive businesses to invest capital in development of new open source software without the risk of having their competition offering the same code the day after the first public release.
