= Air Care Alliance =

- Formation: 1990
- Type: humanitarian air transport
- Headquarters: Lindrith, New Mexico
- Location: United States
- Official language: English
- Chairman and President: Jeff Kahn and Jim Hesseman
- Key people: Kris Luke
- Website: www.aircarealliance.org

The Air Care Alliance (ACA) is an American group founded in 1990 that acts as an umbrella organization for volunteer pilot based Public Benefit Flying (PBF) organizations. PBF organization members use their aircraft to transport needy patients, to assist in disaster relief, to fly environmental support missions, to relocate wild or domestic animals, to provide educational flights for youth, and for many other missions of community and humanitarian support. Such flights are generically referred to as Compassion Flights.

Most PBF group members are volunteer pilots, thus many PBFs are also called Volunteer Pilot Organizations (VPOs). The ACA website's Directory of Groups is the only place where all such groups as are known are listed for the benefit of patients, social workers, medical referral groups, agencies needing assistance, or the volunteer pilots who wish to find all groups they might want to join. In addition the website features an online automated referral system that, using a form filled out by someone making inquiry, will provide a list of appropriate groups serving the states where a flight is needed. Then with one click the information in the form can be sent to each organization the person wishes to be contacted.

The Air Care Alliance is a nonprofit organization, chartered as a 501(c)(3) group, and thus it serves the public benefit first. ACA exists to support and promote Public Benefit Flying so that patients and others can learn about the services provided by volunteer pilots and charitable aviation groups and so that information can be shared among the groups, improving the quality of their services and the safety of their flights. ACA encourages communications and cooperation among all PBF organizations in order that their members share experiences and learn from one another. ACA has held annual "Air Care" conferences since 1990 where leaders in Public Benefit Flying gather to meet one another and learn the latest about this charitable activity.

ACA volunteers also work with aviation organizations such as the Aircraft Owners and Pilots Association, the Experimental Aircraft Association, the National Business Aircraft Association, the General Aviation Manufacturers Association, the National Aeronautic Association, and many others to promote the work of the volunteers who run the groups and provide the flights. ACA representatives also work with the Federal Aviation Administration and the National Transportation Safety Board to ensure that appropriate regulations apply to the flights in the interests of maximizing their benefit to those in need and our communities while enhancing the safety of flight.

Most Public Benefit Flying organizations are chartered as non-profit organizations, permitting their members to take the costs of a flight as a charitable donation. The groups generally do not offer flying services themselves, rather they connect someone seeking a flight with a member pilot or pilots willing to provide it.

== History ==
In 1990, the first national conference of public benefit flying organizations, AIR MED 90, was conceived by Bill Worden, and organized by him and co-founder Rol Murrow at the headquarters of the Aircraft Owners and Pilots Association, supported by AOPA's VP of Communications Patricia Weil Coates. At the meeting the delegates from many VPO's resolved to form the Alliance to better serve the needs of the public and to work in mutual support.

== How service is provided ==
While the Air Care Alliance lists all known PBF organizations, whether ACA Members or not, it does not arrange missions itself. A person or group needing air support services refers to the Air Care Alliance listings and chooses one or more organizations serving its geographic area and type of mission. The person then contacts those PBF organizations directly.

== PBF missions ==
Many PBF organizations have a primary mission of helping patients get to distant locations when the patients cannot afford other transport, a drive would be too long, or circumstances prevent commercial airline flight, such as being in a rural area where no commercial air service is available or having an immune-compromised condition such that flight by airline would expose them to too many strangers. PBF organizations that provide these services include Angel Flight, LifeLine Pilots, Volunteer Pilots Association, and many, many more.

Some PBF organizations specialize in disaster and emergency preparedness. Their pilots fly surveillance missions, send data back to emergency operations centers, transport emergency workers and supplies, and fly search and rescue missions. Examples include the largest such PBF group, the Civil Air Patrol, and the Emergency Volunteer Air Corps (EVAC). EVAC works to promote the idea that many thousands of general aviation pilots and aircraft can provide lifesaving services following a disaster, and encourages all volunteer pilot groups to organize their pilots to that end. The Air Care Alliance has provided seminars on emergency preparedness conducted by EVAC representatives and others, and now most member PBF organizations have an auxiliary mission of providing relief missions when the need arises. See the ACA site for information about such relief efforts after the 9/11 attacks, hurricanes such as Katrina, and earthquakes such as Loma Prieta and Haiti.

Some PBF organizations provide even more specialized services. These include organizations whose pilots fly environmental support missions, such as LightHawk and SouthWings, and groups whose pilots fly terminally ill children on Make-A-Wish and similar flights. Some PBF organizations are also given commercial airline tickets and allocate them to needy individuals. The Veterans Airlift Command flies military veterans for care. Volunteer pilots for the EAA Young Eagles program fly youth ages 8 through 17 on introductory educational flights for free, and as of late 2013 have flown more than 1,800,000 young people. Several groups' volunteers such as those for Pilots 'n Paws transport animals, such as to distant shelters or new habitats.

Note that most of the aircraft are small and cannot cross oceans and in general can't support long international flights. ACA does list VPOs in other countries, notably Canada and Australia, though, and hopes that this kinds of service spreads to many other countries. Some United States based groups operate clinics and relief facilities in other countries, such as Mexico.

== Requirements for service ==
The requirements for patients for flights and for the volunteer pilots who might provide them vary considerably from group to group. Patients typically must demonstrate financial or other compelling need. Generally most groups require that they must also be ambulatory, able to sit in a seat on a small plane and not require professional medical care enroute. Often a physician's signoff is required, along with that of a social worker at a medical facility attesting to financial need. There are also a few groups who do fly non-ambulatory (stretcher) patients, and at least one group has a fully certified charitable air ambulance.

Pilots generally must have qualifications appropriate for each group's kinds of missions flown and for the weather and circumstances of the area where they will be flying. These vary considerably from group to group, so pilots need to inquire of each group in which they may be interested to see if they meet that group's requirements.
