= Voluntary Partnership Agreement =

A Voluntary Partnership Agreement (VPA) is a bilateral timber-trade agreement between the European Union and a timber-exporting country outside the EU. VPAs are a key element of the EU FLEGT Action Plan, which aims to address illegal logging.

Under a VPA, the partner country agrees to export only legal timber products to the EU. The EU agrees to give verified legal ('FLEGT-licensed) timber products from the country free access to the EU market. The EU also commits to denying entry to any timber shipments from a VPA partner country that lack FLEGT licences and must therefore be illegal.

The aim is to use trade as an incentive, as FLEGT-licensed timber automatically meets the requirements of the EU Timber Regulation, which requires EU operators to use due diligence to prevent illegal wood entering the market. FLEGT licensed timber will not be subject to those checks so will have a green light to enter the EU.

The core of each VPA is the description of a timber legality assurance system the partner country will implement in order to verify the legality of timber products and issue verified legal products with FLEGT licences. Each timber legality assurance system must have the following five components: a legality definition, supply chain controls, verification of compliance, FLEGT licensing and independent audit of the whole system.

VPAs are also intended to strengthen forest governance in timber-exporting countries by improving transparency, accountability and stakeholder participation. Such gains may result from commitments the partner country makes in the VPA text and annexes, or from the very process of negotiating and implementing a VPA.

The FLEGT Regulation, which the EU adopted in 2005 under the FLEGT Action Plan, empowers the European Commission to negotiate VPAs with timber-exporting countries.

On 21 April 2016, the Presidents of Indonesia, the European Commission and the European Council confirmed that Indonesia had met the final major requirement of its VPA and was on course to become the world's first country to issue ‘FLEGT’ licences. Among other VPA partner countries, Ghana is also in an advanced stage of implementing its timber legality assurance system ahead of FLEGT licensing.

== Overview of VPAs ==
Together, the 15 countries negotiating or implementing VPAs supply 80 percent of the EU's tropical timber.

Countries negotiating VPAs: Nine countries are negotiating VPAs with the EU: Côte d'Ivoire, Democratic Republic of the Congo, Gabon, Guyana, Honduras, Laos, Malaysia, Thailand, Vietnam

Countries implementing VPAs: Six countries have completed VPA negotiations and, together with the EU, are implementing their agreements: Cameroon, Central African Republic, Ghana, Liberia, Indonesia, Republic of the Congo Indonesia became the first country to issue FLEGT licenses, followed in october 2025 by Ghana.

Countries with active licensing practice: As of 2026, Indonesia and Ghana are the only countries which are issuing FLEGT licences for verified legal timber. The timber is automatically fulfilling the European Union Timber Regulation and can be imported to and traded within the EU.

Other countries: Other countries in Africa (Sierra Leone), South East Asia (Myanmar and Cambodia), Latin America (Bolivia, Colombia, Ecuador, Guatemala, Nicaragua and Peru) and the South Pacific (Papua New Guinea and the Solomon Islands) have also participated in informal VPA discussions with the EU.

== VPA processes ==
VPA processes can be divided into three broad phases, whose boundaries may blur: pre-negotiation, negotiation and implementation. The EU advocates for stakeholder participation throughout VPA processes in order to foster national ownership of the VPA and its commitments. VPA negotiations do not only take place between the EU and the partner country. Negotiations within and among stakeholder groups are what shape the contents, scope and ambition of each VPA.

In 2014, the FAO-EU FLEGT Programme of the Food and Agriculture Organization of the United Nations published The Voluntary Partnership Agreement (VPA) process in Central and West Africa: from theory to practice,^{[17]} which documents and discusses good practices for stakeholders in partner countries that are negotiating a VPA - or due to enter into such negotiations.

== See also ==
- Illegal logging
- EU FLEGT Action Plan
- EU Timber Regulation
