= COCERAL =

European trade association

- Formation: 8 June 1958
- Headquarters: Brussels, Belgium
- Members: 21 National Associations in 15 countries
- Website: www.coceral.com

COCERAL (Acronym for Comité du Commerce des céréales, aliments du bétail, oléagineux, huile d'olive, huiles et graisses et agrofournitures) is a European association, representing the trade in cereals, rice, feedstuffs, oilseeds, olive oil, oils and fats and agrosupply.

== History ==
COCERAL was founded in Antwerp, Belgium, on 8 June 1958 by a committee representing the cereals and feedstuffs traders called COCERAL - a section of the now dissolved "Union Européenne des Grains". It became an organisation in parallel to the development of the European Community. Its membership has grown from 6 to 9 member countries in 1973, 10 in 1981, 12 in 1985, 15 in 1995 and 25 in 2004. The European association representing agribulk storers, Unistock Europe , became full member of COCERAL in 2004. In 2003 Euromalt , representing the European malting industry and Euromaisiers, the European Maize milling industry moved their Secretariats to the COCERAL premises to form closer links with other actors in the grain business and related supply chain.

== Mission and activity ==
COCERAL represents the interests of the European trade in grains and oilseeds, feedstuffs, rice, olive oil, oils and fats and agro-supply towards the European Union and international institutions, international bodies and stakeholders.

- voice the key role of trade across the agricultural supply chain
- formulate and present common positions to contribute to a workable regulatory framework within the EU
- monitor and guide EU policy making process in market, food safety and environmental matters impacting trade
- promote strategies for the supply of safe food ingredients and feed raw materials to the benefit of EU downstream agricultural industries and consumers
- promote self-regulation and best practices via a risk based Code of Good Trading Practice (Coceral GTP)

== Structure ==
COCERAL is structured around a Presidium and Board which are underlined by several Sections with dedicated missions. The Presidium consists of the Association's president, vice-president, one chairman and one vice-chairman for each of the Sections. All Presidium and board members are elected for a mandate period of two years.

=== Sections ===
- Markets and Common Agricultural Policy: EU grain markets analysis; preparation of the cereals, and oilseeds crop forecasts; world market for cereals; EU import and export policy examinations and legislation; multilateral and bilateral trade negotiations.
- Food and Feed Safety and Environment: Specific expertise on the technical requirements to trade, the Genetically Modified Organism (GMO) dossiers, the General traceability regulation, hygiene packages, official controls for food and feed, pesticide residues as well as contaminants and undesirable substances.
- Rice: Import regime and the effects of multilateral and bilateral agreements
- Olive Oil: common organisation of the market in olive oil and table olives; the quality strategy and food safety related issues; follow-up on the work of the International Olive Oil Council; traceability, commercial rules (organoleptic characteristics), promotion, consequences for the sector of the EU enlargement.
- Agrosupply: analysis of markets for fertilisers and plant protection products, examination of regulatory matters (the thematic strategy for a sustainable use of pesticides, maximum limits for pesticide residues, cross-compliance, and cadmium content in phosphate fertilizers)

== Members ==
COCERAL's full members are 21 national associations in 15 countries and 1 European association [Unistock]. With about 3500 companies as part of COCERAL national members, the sector trades agricultural raw materials destined to the supply of the food and feed chains, as well as for technical and energy uses. COCERAL has 1 associated member in Switzerland. Gafta is an extraordinary member of COCERAL.
