= Volunteer Pilots Association =

Public benefit flying organization

- Formation: 1990
- Type: Humanitarian Air Transport
- Headquarters: Bridgeville, Pennsylvania
- Location: United States
- Members: Air Care Alliance
- Official language: English
- President: Tim Silbaugh
- Website: Volunteer Pilots Association

The Volunteer Pilots Association (VPA) is an American public benefit flying (PBF) group founded in 1990. The Volunteer Pilots Association provides free non-emergency air transportation to and from medical appointments for patients with a financial need. Headquartered in southwestern Pennsylvania, the VPA is an all-volunteer non-profit organization. All member pilots fly privately owned planes and donate their time and flight expenses.

The VPA also transports donor organs and other time-critical medically related items and provides emergency/disaster relief as part of emergency preparedness.

The VPA is one of only 70 volunteer pilot organizations in the nation—and the only one based in southwestern Pennsylvania—that fly medical assistance missions. The organization serves residents of Pennsylvania, Ohio, New Jersey, New York, Virginia, West Virginia, Maryland and Delaware, often flying patients to and from health care centers that are up to 300 miles from their homes. For missions outside that radius, the VPA partners with other volunteer pilot organizations. Flights are made in general aviation aircraft, usually seating four to six people, including the crew.

By using general aviation aircraft the VPA is able to operate in areas that don't have airline service. The VPA can operate in rural areas and, unlike airlines, can land and take off on relatively short runways. In the US there are over 13 thousand public and private airports that can be used by general aviation aircraft, of which only a few hundred can be used by the airlines.

The VPA is a member of the Air Care Alliance.

== Method of operation ==
VPA Member Pilots provide free air transportation for people in need who must travel long distances to seek medical attention not readily available in their area. VPA Pilots also assist with the transport of donor organs. Occasionally the person transported is not a patient, but a relative or close friend of a patient, for example when a terminally ill patient cannot leave the hospital anymore.

The VPA does not provide the actual transportation. Instead, the VPA links member pilots and patients (and their relatives) and hospital workers or social workers. A pilot can then accept a mission from the missions organized by one of the VPA Mission Coordinators.

The VPA also engages VPA Volunteers, for example to assist patients who require specialized medical treatment at the facility or who need general help with the transportation.

A VPA mission is organized by a VPA Mission Coordinator. Usually a social worker or hospital workers contacts a VPA Mission Coordinator to request a flight. Then flight dates, times, locations, number of passengers, and other medical contact people are discussed. The VPA Mission Coordinator then sends out an email to all VPA Pilots and enters them in the web-based on-line database, where pilots can log in and browse all available missions at a glance, along with pertinent flight information and maps.

Not every patient can be transported by the VPA. All VPA Patients must be medically stable and capable of walking on their own and sitting upright in an unpressurised aircraft unassisted. The VPA also does not provide emergency flights or air ambulance flights.

== VPA Pilots ==
The VPA Pilots volunteer all costs associated with the flight: time, direct operating expenses, fees, and indirect expenses, such as wear and tear or depreciation. The VPA Pilots can use their own personal aircraft or use rented airplanes. Pilots must meet certain minimum flight experience requirements before they are permitted to fly for the VPA, and they have to follow the guidelines of the VPA Guidebook. The VPA Pilots generally have an instrument-rating, and some have a Commercial Pilot License. The VPA Pilots provide a variety of aircraft, ranging from Piper Cherokees to a CitationJet.

== Operating area ==
The VPA generally operates in the NorthEast quadrant of the United States – serving residents of Pennsylvania, Ohio, New Jersey, New York, Virginia, West Virginia, Maryland and Delaware and usually flying patients to and from health care centers that are up to 300 miles from their homes. On occasion, for flights of greater distances, the VPA partners with other volunteer pilot groups in other parts of the country.

VPA Logo

== Awards and distinctions ==
The VPA has received a variety of awards and distinctions that reflect its commitment to community service:

- Second civilian aircraft in the air after September 11, 2001, flying blood and blood-related supplies in a relay from Oklahoma City to the New York area.
- Participated in airlifting supplies to Louisiana in the immediate aftermath of Hurricane Katrina.
- VPA member on the ground in Baton Rouge coordinating arrival and dispatch of general aviation aircraft carrying Katrina refugees and medical supplies.
- Recipient of 2003 Public Benefit Team Award from National Aeronautic Association, Washington, DC, for relief missions following Sept. 11, 2001.
- Recipient of 2005 Public Benefit Team Award from National Aeronautic Association, Washington, DC, for outstanding mission coordination achievements.
- VPA responded to requests for assistance from friends of the family of one of the most seriously injured survivors of the Virginia Tech massacre. When they were having difficulties with scheduling airline transportation, VPA set up a number of missions over several weeks to provide transportation between Roanoke, VA, where their son was hospitalized, and their home over 300 miles away.
