= Telematics Freedom Foundation =

Telematics Freedom Foundation is a non-profit organization which aims to bring citizens, in the age of telematics, Internet, mobile phones and the web, all those freedoms and rights that the Free Software Movement has already brought to PC users worldwide.

== Projects ==
TFF is working on a definition of "free telematics" as the freedom to run a web service, for any purpose, study its inner workings and adapt it, accessing the source code, redistribute copies of it, and above all verifying it is actually performing as expected, which are all essential prerequisites for any reliable and transparent e-democracy systems based on the web. A formal draft proposal, based on Free Software, is currently under development.

Telematics Freedom Foundation is an advocate of the concept of Continuous Democracy, which stands for the power of citizens to practice democracy not only at the time of elections, but on every single instance they might find it is needed, through constant discussion and confrontation between involved peers. From this viewpoint, it is also developing software for remote democratic organization, which will constitute a touchstone for the model of production, sharing and full control outlined by the idea of Telematics Freedom it is promoting.

The Foundation is also working on the consolidation of a huge multimedia collection, the Universal Audiovisual Library. This will host hundreds of thousands of Gigabytes of audio and video contents in their original language, released under open and public licenses. It will serve as an exhaustive source of material to be freely remixed and published by content editors and providers, with the intent of spreading knowledge. One example of this will be the Lazio DNA project (where DNA stands for Digital Nature Archive), a large set of raw full HD footage of Lazio region's natural landscape and cultural heritage, available under a Creative Commons Attribution-Share Alike license. Moreover, to enrich the library and provide citizens with even more content to freely browse and view, the foundation is also promoting participatory journalism, through the "social video packs" project. Inspired by two successful experiments already implemented in Brazil, the "Pontos de Cultura" and "Estúdio Livre", it will establish a series of multimedia centers based on Linux, equipped for creation, editing and post-production of videos created by citizens, which will be equipped with a backpack containing a camcorder and everything they need to perform video footage on the road.

Telematics Freedom Foundation endorses the adoption of the GNU Affero General Public License to guarantee transparency and accountability for open-source e-voting and e-democracy software. In fact, under this license all running source code of a web application should be made freely downloadable from final users at all time, and this should actually give them reasonable practical means to verify the software they are accessing. In order to provide further concrete control, the Foundation also proposed that server rooms (or "cages") hosting free telematic services would be physically managed applying those same (or enhanced) physical security provisions that are currently applied to ballot boxes during an election. In practice, physical access to such servers would be enabled only while a few randomly selected or elected users (or citizens) are physically present.

The foundation also launched a video website featuring socio-political and satirical content, www.popolobue.tv, which should serve as a model of a television democratically controlled by its viewers.

== See also ==
- Partecs
