= Timber Trade Federation =

- Abbreviation: TTF
- Formation: 1892
- Purpose: Timber industry
- Location: London, WC1
- Region served: United Kingdom
- President: Stephen B. King
- Affiliations: CBI, CTI
- Website: ttf.co.uk

The Timber Trade Federation (TTF), is a British federation of timber traders, founded in 1892 and based in London. It groups together more than 370 voluntary member companies operating as agents, importers, manufacturers, merchants and sawmillers. It is a member of the Confederation of Timber Industries (CTI) and the Confederation of British Industry (CBI). TTF members are bound to satisfy specific criteria concerning sustainable sourcing and harvesting before joining the federation. In 2008 the Timber Trade Federation introduced its “Responsible Purchasing Policy” (RPP) and in 2013 adopted the European Union Timber Regulation.

== Structure ==
TTF operates through a Governing Board comprising representatives of the Product Divisions of softwood, hardwood and panel products and representatives of all the member organisations. The Officers are directly elected and the Product Divisions are made up of elected members. The president of the board is Stephen B. King since June 2013.

== See also ==
- Forestry in the United Kingdom
- British timber trade
