= European Union Timber Regulation =

EU regulation

The European Union Timber Regulation (EUTR) aims to counter illegal logging and associated trade in timber and timber products in the member states of the European Union, and ultimately contribute to sustainable management of forests and reduced emissions from deforestation and forest degradation beyond EU borders. The EUTR establishes obligations on 'operators' who place timber and timber products on the market and on 'traders' who buy or sell timber or timber products already on the internal market.

The regulation is an outcome of the EU's FLEGT (Forest Law Enforcement, Governance and Trade) Action Plan, which aims to reduce illegal logging worldwide. The Action Plan recognised the possibility of developing new legislation to address the demand side of illegal logging. This resulted in the adoption of the EUTR in December 2010. The EUTR entered into force on 3 March 2013. It is directly applicable in all EU member states. In February 2016, the European Commission published an updated version of the Guidance Document for the EU Timber Regulation.

The EUTR is to be superseded by the EU Regulation on Deforestation-free products (EUDR).

== Scope ==
The EUTR covers a range of timber products such as solid wood products, flooring, plywood, pulp and paper that are listed the EUTR's Annex. The EUTR does not cover recycled products, as well as printed papers such as books, magazines and newspapers. The product scope can however be amended. The EUTR applies to both imported and domestically produced timber and timber products. Timber and timber products covered by valid FLEGT or CITES licences automatically meet the requirements of the EUTR.

== Obligations ==
The EUTR prohibits the placing onto the EU market of illegally harvested timber and timber products derived from such timber. It requires operators who place timber or timber products on the market for the first time to exercise due diligence to make sure that timber and timber products are legal. To facilitate the traceability of timber and timber products, the EUTR also requires traders who buy or sell timber products on the EU market to keep records of their suppliers and customers. The due diligence system shall contain the following three elements:

1. Information: Operators shall provide the following information: a description of the timber or timber products placed on the market (including trade name and type of product, common name of tree species and, if applicable, their scientific name), country of harvest, quantity, details of the supplier and information on compliance with applicable legislation.
2. Risk assessment: Operators should analyse and evaluate the risk of illegally harvested timber or timber products placed on the market, based on the information identified above and taking into account relevant risk assessment criteria set out in the EUTR, including but not limited to, assurance of compliance with applicable legislation, prevalence of illegal harvesting of specific tree species, prevalence of illegal harvesting or practices in the sourcing country, complexity of the supply chain.
3. Risk mitigation: When the assessment has demonstrated that there is a risk of illegally harvested timber or timber products derived from such timber, operators shall mitigate such risk by requiring additional information and/or verification by a third party.

Operators can set up due diligence systems on an individual basis or with the assistance of monitoring organisations (Article 8). Monitoring organisations are legal entities recognised by the European Commission, as fulfilling the EUTR requirements, competent to assist operators in meeting the EUTR due diligence obligations.

== Implementation ==
The Regulation is legally binding on all 28 EU Member States. The EUTR requires all EU member states to implement the Regulation by designating a ‘competent authority’ responsible for its application (Article 7), lay down “effective, proportionate and dissuasive” penalties applicable to infringements of the EUTR and take all measures necessary to guarantee that penalties are enforced (Article 19).

== Review ==
In 2015, the European Commission undertook a review of the EUTR, in compliance with a legal obligation laid down in Article 20(3) of the Regulation. The purpose of the review is to assess the functioning and effectiveness of the EUTR, including in preventing illegally harvested timber or timber products derived from such timber being placed on the market. More than 240 stakeholders, NGOs and the private sector contributed to a public consultation as part of the review process.

The Commission published the review on 18 February 2016. It concluded that "the EU is on track to achieve its objectives to combat illegal logging and associated trade in illegal timber, but challenges remain".

According to the commission: "Some positive trends are visible, namely that EU operators are gradually taking steps to ensure the legality of their suppliers and that there is more awareness of the problem of illegal logging amongst EU consumers. The Regulation has also encouraged producer countries to develop systems assessing compliance with the requirements of the legislation. However, more effort is needed from both the Member States and the private sector to ensure its effective and efficient application".

For the EU to achieve their goal, it passed additional deforestation regulation into law, effective as of December 2024.
