= Illegal logging =

Harvest, transportation, purchase, or sale of timber in violation of laws

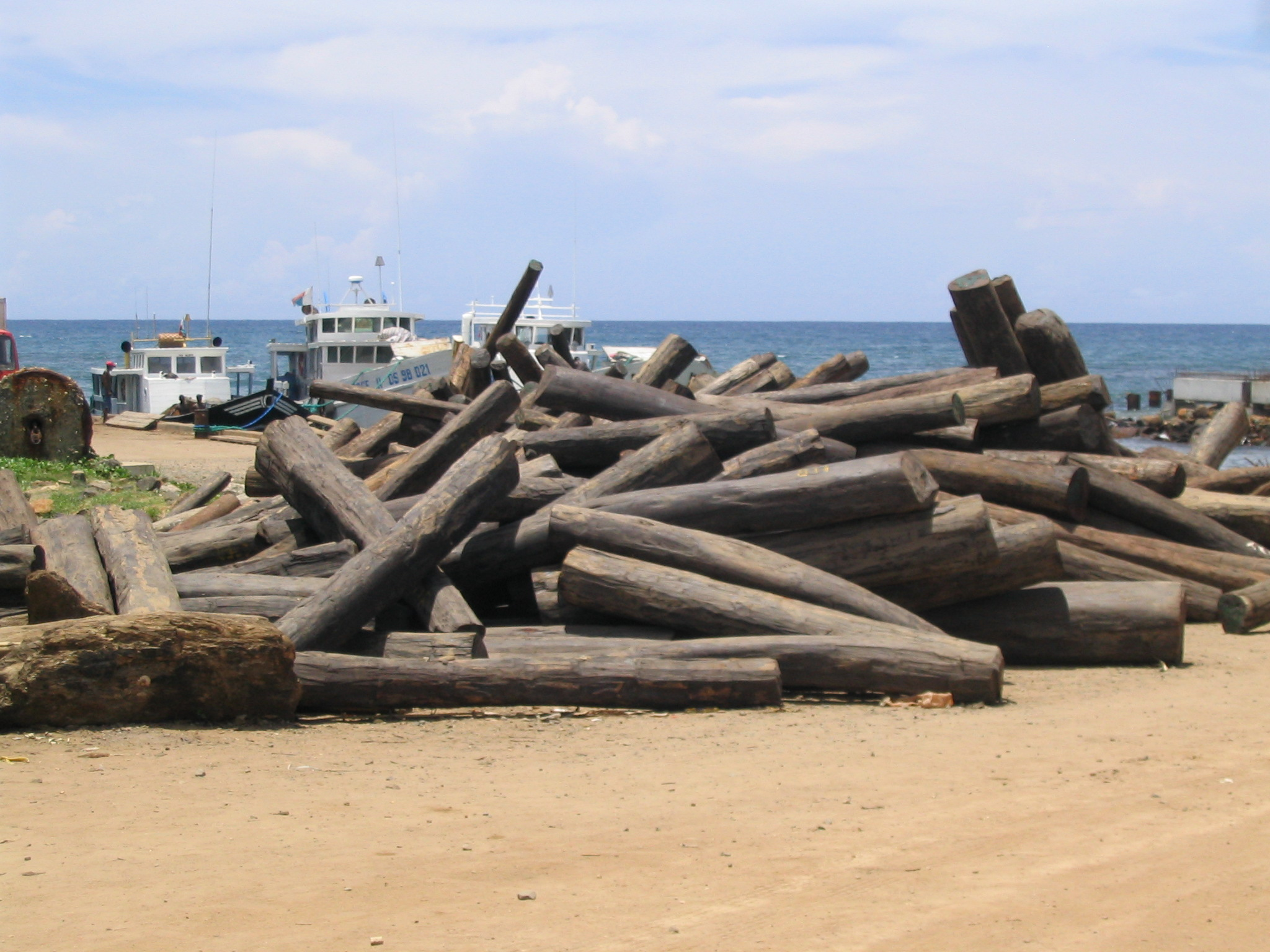
Stockpile and export of rosewood from illegal logging in Madagascar

Illegal logging is the harvest, transportation, purchase, or sale of timber in violation of laws. The harvesting procedure itself may be illegal, including using corrupt means to gain access to forests; extraction without permission, or from a protected area; the cutting down of protected species; or the extraction of timber in excess of agreed limits. Illegal logging is a driving force for a number of environmental issues such as deforestation, soil erosion and biodiversity loss which can drive larger-scale environmental crises such as climate change and other forms of environmental degradation.

Illegality may also occur during transport, such as illegal processing and export (through fraudulent declaration to customs); the avoidance of taxes and other charges, and fraudulent certification. These acts are often referred to as "wood laundering".

Illegal logging is driven by a number of economic forces, such as demand for raw materials, land grabbing and demand for pasture for cattle. Regulation and prevention can happen at both the supply side, with better enforcement of environmental protections, and at the demand side, such as an increasing regulation of trade as part of the international lumber industry.

The term 'timber theft' is an alternate name for illegal logging, especially logging done on a smaller scale and without the landowner's permission.

== Overview ==
Illegal logging is a pervasive problem, causing enormous damage to forests, local communities, and the economies of producer countries. The EU, as a major timber importer, has implemented the European Union Timber Regulation as a means to halt the import of illegally sourced wood products. The identification of illegally logged or traded timber is technically difficult, but a series of attempts is made. Therefore, a legal basis for normative acts against timber imports or other products manufactured out of illegal wood is missing. Scientific methods to pinpoint the geographic origin of timber are currently under development. Possible actions to restrict imports cannot meet with WTO regulations of non-discrimination. They must instead be arranged in bilateral agreements. TRAFFIC, the wildlife trade monitoring network, strives to monitor the illegal trade of timber and provide expertise in policy and legal reviews.

=== Scale ===
It is estimated that illegal logging on public land alone causes losses in assets and revenue in excess of US$10 billion annually. Although exact figures are difficult to calculate, given the illegal nature of the activity, decent estimates show that more than half of the logging that takes place globally is illegal, especially in open and vulnerable areas, such as the Amazon Basin, Central Africa, Southeast Asia and the Russian Federation.

Available figures and estimates must be treated with caution. Governments tend to underestimate the situation, given that high estimates of illegal logging may cause embarrassment as these to suggest ineffective enforcement of legislation or, even worse, bribery and corruption. On the other hand, environmental NGOs publish alarming figures to raise awareness and emphasize the need for stricter conservation measures. For companies in the forestry sector, publications making high estimates can be regarded as potentially threatening to their reputation and their market perspective, including the competitiveness of wood in comparison to other materials. However, for many countries, NGOs are the only source of information apart from state institutions, which probably clearly underestimates the true figures. For example, the Republic of Estonia calculated a rate of 1% illegally harvested timber in 2003, whereas it was estimated to reach as much as 50% by the NGO "Estonian Green Movement". In Latvia, the situation is comparable; anecdotal evidence points towards 25% of logging being illegal.

=== Consequences ===
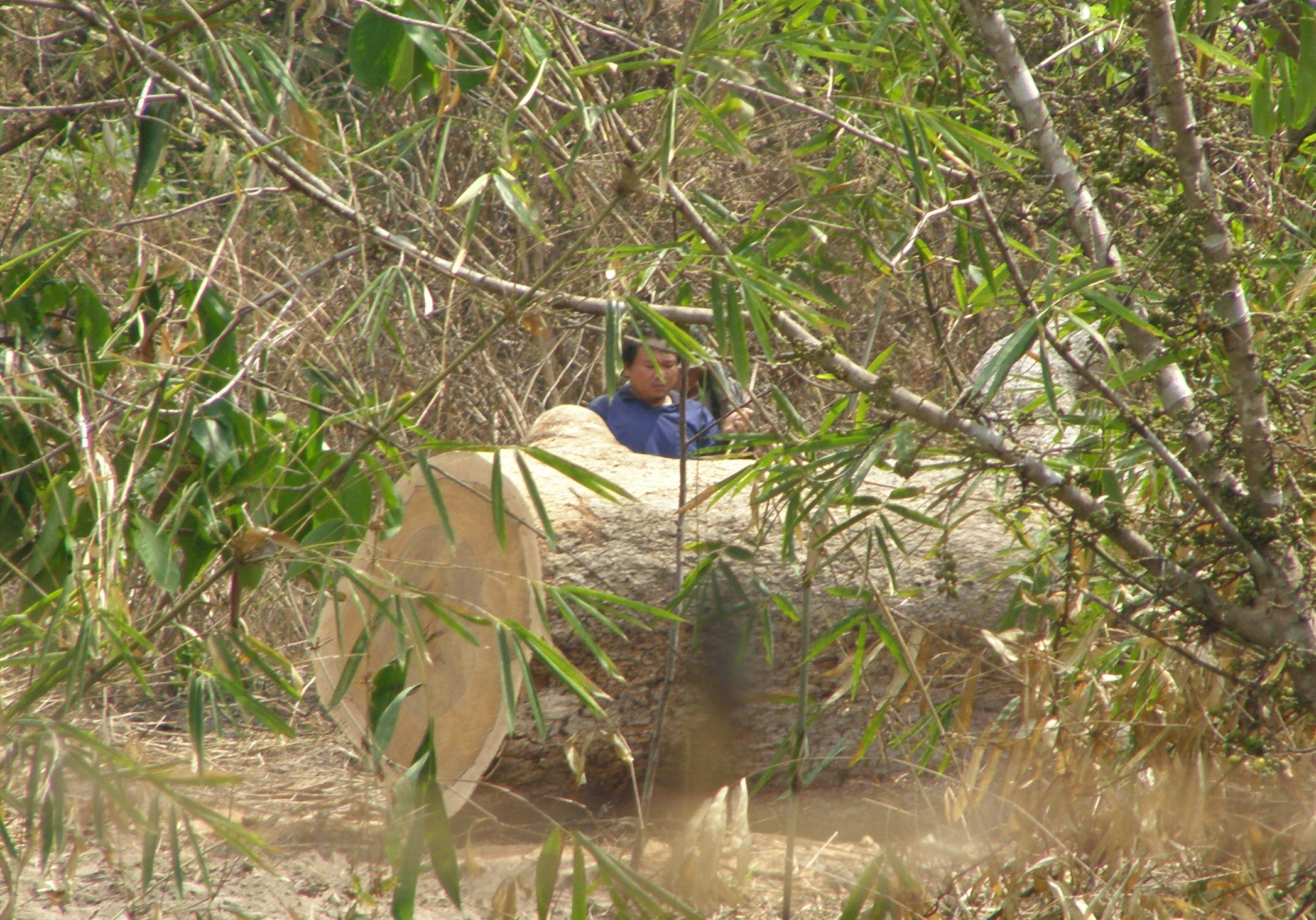
Illegal logging continues in Thailand. This photograph was taken from the roadside in Mae Wang District, Chiang Mai Province, in March 2011.

Illegal logging has detrimental impacts, including deforestation and, consequently, global warming. It leads to biodiversity loss, weakens the rule of law, and hampers responsible forest management. Moreover, it fosters corruption, tax evasion, and diminishes revenue for producer countries, limiting their capacity to invest in sustainable development. The economic and social consequences disproportionately affect the poor and disadvantaged, resulting in the loss of millions of dollars in timber revenue annually.

Furthermore, the illegal trade of forest resources undermines international security, and is frequently associated with corruption, money laundering, organized crime, human rights abuses, climate change and, in some cases, violent conflict. In the forestry sector, cheap imports of illegal timber and forest products, together with the non-compliance of some economic players with basic social and environmental standards, destabilize international markets. This unfair competition affects those European companies, especially the small and medium-sized companies that are behaving responsibly and ready to play by fair rules.

== Signs of illegal logging ==
=== Large Scale ===
Large scale logging is usually done by private companies or organizations, rather than individual people. The possibility of large-scale exploitation often depends upon exploiting land that doesn't have clear ownership, breaking laws that have a lack of enforcement due to a weak or corrupt government, or land that is owned by people with limited ability to defend their property rights (such as indigenous groups in South America).

Illegal logging is often a deep rooted and widespread issue in the places afflicted with it. An example is Colombia, where even though illegal logging has been reduced over the years, the Colombian government officially reports that 80% to 90% of all logging in the nation is still illegal. A 1998 study from a commission of the Brazilian Chamber of Deputies showed that around 80% of the logging operations in Brazil were illegal, and of the 13 logging companies in Brazil that were investigated, 12 were found to have broken the law (92.3%).

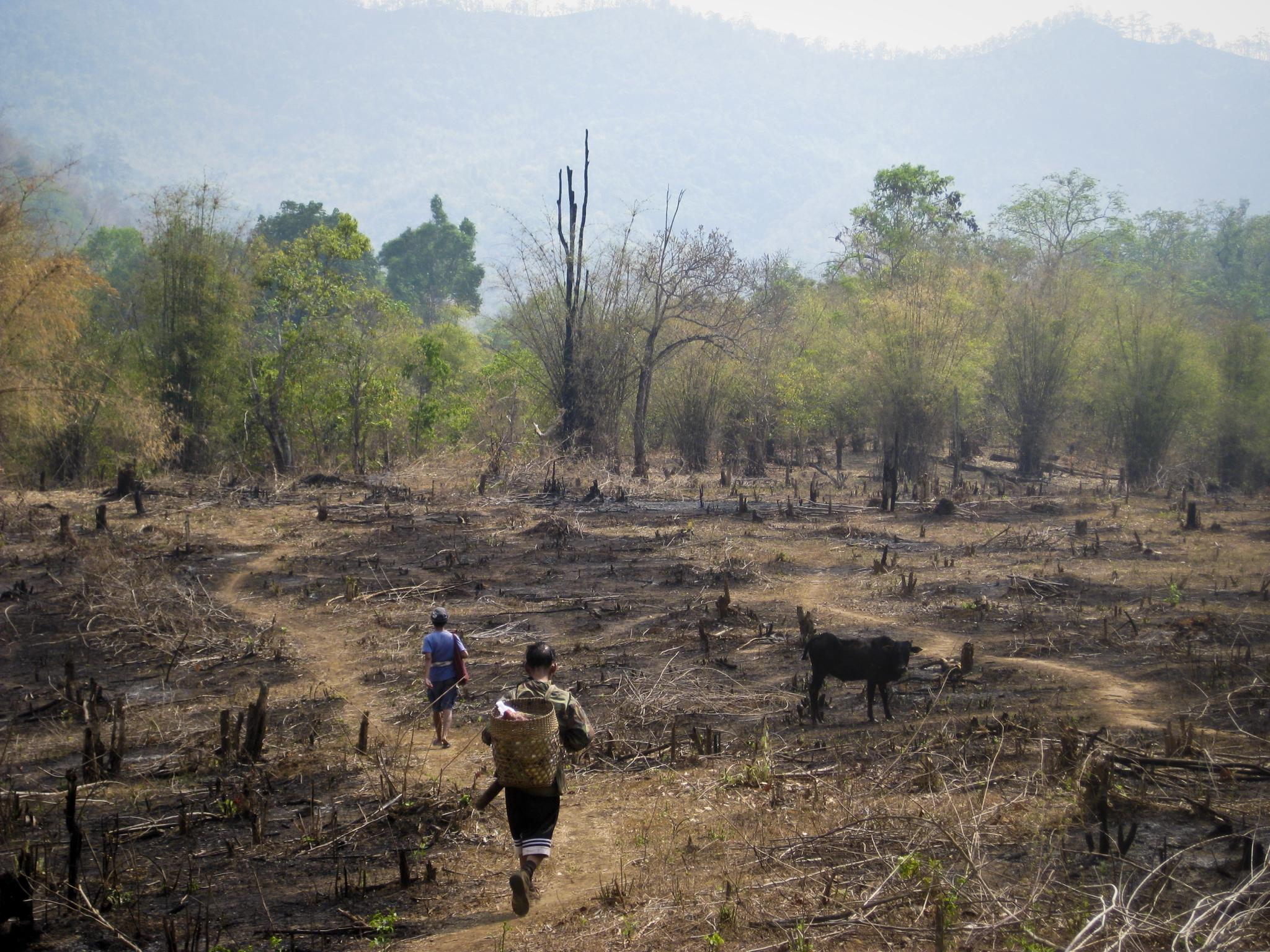
An example of slash and burn: where a patch of forest is clearcut, and the leftover brush and vegetation is burnt to remove it. This is a common way to clear land and establish livestock areas.

In nations where illegal logging is endemic, there is a close relationship between large scale illegal logging and road construction, and between people migrating or establishing settlements. When a road needs to be built through forests, it's common for a logging company to be contacted, and make large profits from the cleared trees, while skipping many steps for approval to cut down the trees, due to the operation being framed as a construction service rather than logging operation. In return, the creation of a new road deeper into a forest enables greater access to new areas for illegal logging operations. In the Amazon Rainforest, it's common for the establishment of villages and towns to induce deforestation, and in return, it's also common for places that have been deforested to invite the establishment of human settlements.

Illegal logging is often justified by framing it as providing space for businesses and homes in impoverished rural communities. It can also be framed as gathering firewood, lumber, minerals, petroleum, and space for cattle, to provide resources to a struggling economy. In this way, illegal logging becomes normalized and systematic, because these logging operations are portrayed as a service to society, rather than crimes or environmental exploitation. One of the largest risk factors for illegal logging is a nation being a developing country, because of both the prioritization of economic development and a lack of enough government resources to adequately protect the environment.

Common signs of widespread illegal logging by a logging group include:

- Use of forged permits, or not having a permit.
- Bribing, intimidating, or otherwise acting corruptly towards the authorities, such as politicians, permission granting offices, or law enforcement.
- Cutting any valuable tree regardless of what's protected by law, or targeting species that are known to have high market value (such as Ipê, Rosewood, or Teak).
- Cutting more than what's authorized, or more than what a quota allows.
- Making no attempt to avoid damaging trees and vegetation not intended for harvest.
- Clearcutting, rather than a management plan that considers the future timber stock. Harvests in legitimate forestry usually leave younger and smaller trees to inherit the space and grow into the next crop.
- Cutting outside of the area authorities have approved for logging.
- Logging inside of areas that are known to be protected, or reserved for indigenous people.
- Lack of replanting, and general disregard for the regeneration of the next cohort of trees. This is because the logging company has no incentive to replant due to the extra expense, and they are only concerned with short term value extraction.
- General lack of concern for the wellbeing of the environment, such as a lack of protection from erosion, pollution with garbage or machine fuel, or a lack of habitat preservation for animals.
- Investment of foreign entities or other third parties in the operation, such as Asian firms investing in operations in Brazil, who are concerned with profit and not the future wellbeing of the environment.
- Illegal logging operations often operate in very remote areas where detection and enforcement is difficult. However, it's important to note that being remote does not automatically indicate an illegal operation.
- Harassing indigenous people (or other locals), violence against indigenous people, intimidation, or carrying an unusual amount of firearms.

=== Smaller Scale (Timber theft) ===
Timber theft usually refers to private individuals exploiting land on a small scale, rather than large operations. Timber thieves often exhibit behavior unlike that of legitimate loggers, and most likely are unauthorized to be on the site. Signs of a trespassing timber thief can include:

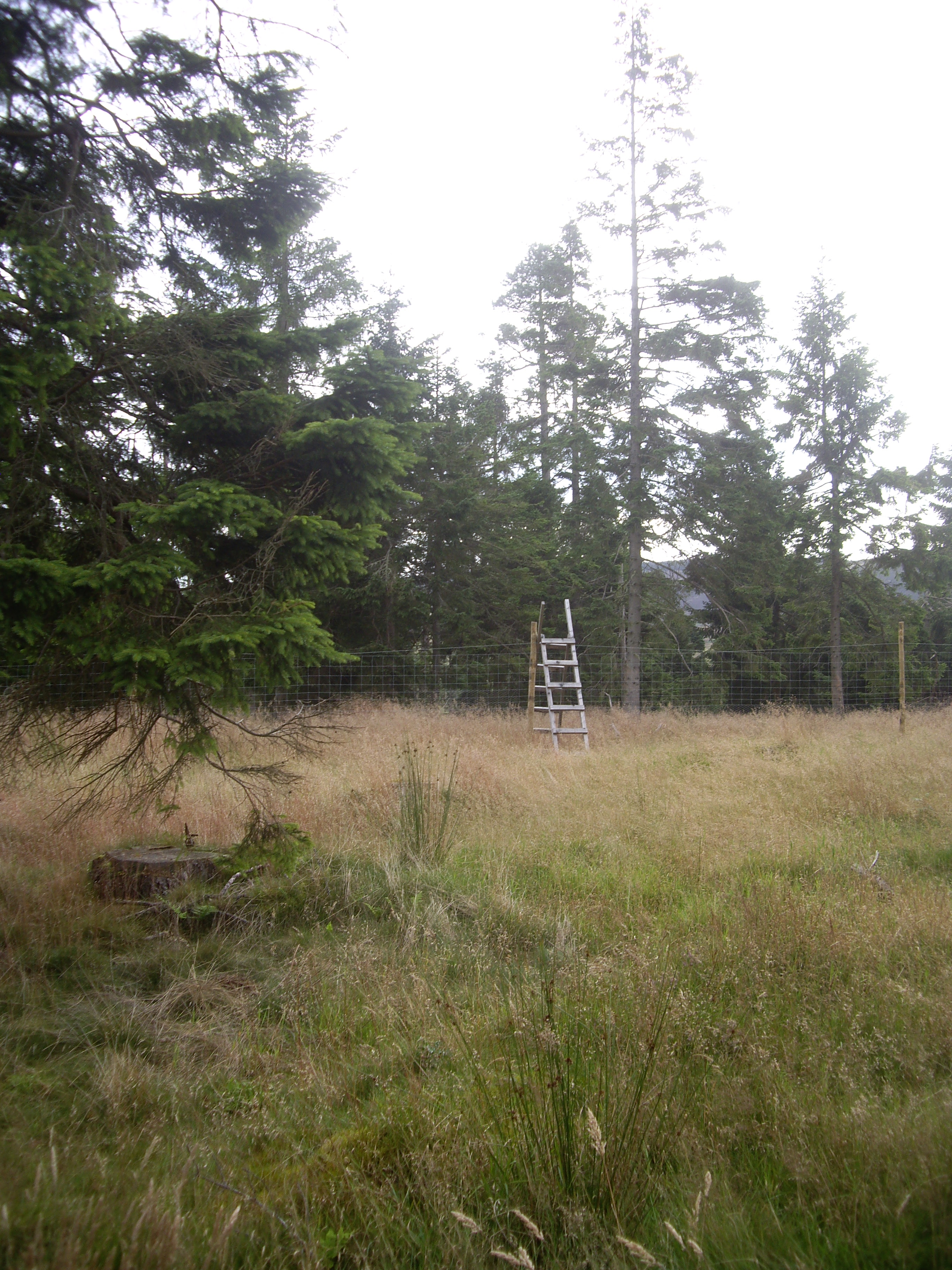
- A movable ladder over a fence. Trespassers often use ladders, ropes, or other methods to bypass barriers and enter a property.
  A person being present in a forest without permission, or without clear reason.
- Someone logging at nighttime.
- Logs that have been legally harvested and left on site for future transport, going missing without explanation.
- A person using homemade gear or low duty gear that's unusual for a professional logger. Such as a vehicle not meant to haul logs, or clearly unprofessional gear such as a DIY rope harness.
- Entering a property in a way that suggests trespassing (like crossing a barb wire fence when there is a entry path nearby, destroying or putting ladders over physical barriers, or making strange routes through a forest when there is a more practical one).
- Trees/timber missing from the property without explanation.
- Unusual vehicle traffic (such as unauthorized ATV activity, or a truck parked on a rural road suspiciously).
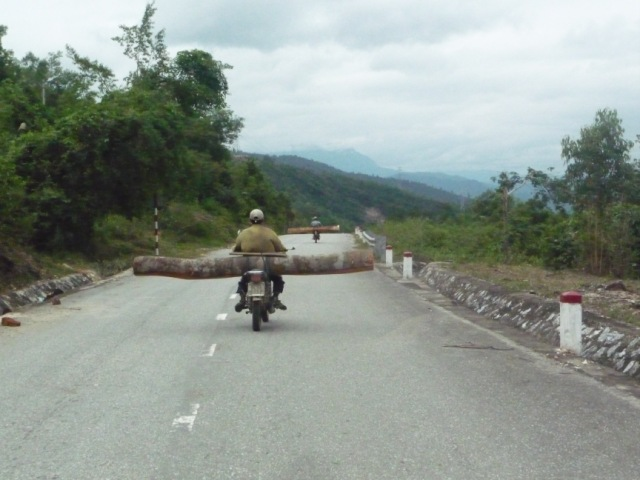
  Men transporting logs in unusually low amounts, and with unprofessional equipment. A common sign of timber theft.
- A logger acting strange when encountered, or offering to pay when confronted.
- Logs that are hidden or visually obscured under something, such as brush piles, leaf piles, or a tarp.
- Logs that have been smeared with dirt or other substances on the butt of the log (where the cut is) so the ring pattern of the log cannot be easily matched to a stump.
- A logger giving vague or unclear answers when the sawmill asks where the logs were cut from.
- Someone transporting suspiciously low amounts of timber (such as a trailer with a single log on it). Most professional loggers won't bother harvesting timber unless there is a significant amount to be harvested, and will transport dozens of logs at a time to the sawmill.

A legitimate logger authorized to be on the site can also occasionally engage in timber theft. Overcutting (cutting more than agreed) and underpayment schemes (paying less than the landowner deserves) are common unethical practices that could be considered timber theft. Examples include:

- Purposely damaging trees not intended for harvest, so there is an excuse to cut and remove them.
- If cutting an entire area, a logger cutting over a larger area than agreed upon. This is common in stands where trees aren't marked or areas aren't given clear boundaries.
- Cutting a tree not marked for harvest, if the chance of detection is low, or if the logger can convince the landowner that workers involved made a mistake when marking.
- In operations where the log and its stump is given correlating paint marks, a logger will mark stumps after cutting an unmarked tree.
- Timber can be sold by different units of volume, such as cubic foot, cubic meter, and Boardfoot. The volume of timber in a log can be estimated with Scribner, Doyle, or International scales. A common underpayment scheme is writing contracts with unclear units of volume, or unclear scales to estimate that volume, meant to deceive the landowner into thinking the timber being sold is less than it actually is.
- Some loggers will offer to cruise and grade the timber themself, and be dishonest in the inventory report by underestimating volume or underrating the quality.
- A logger may set a very low offer for the timber if an owner is unfamiliar with what timber volume exists on the property. It's recommended for a landowner to consult a forester or other professional who isn't financially invested in the sale, to give an accurate report of the timber before negotiating with a logger.
- A logger may offer to pay the landowner based on scale slips from a sawmill, but not show the owner all of the slips available, or not tell which sawmill the timber is going to.
- A logger pursuing a vulnerable landowner, such as widows or inheritors unfamiliar with the property, financially desperate people, or an adult that lacks the mental competence to effectively self-advocate and negotiate a fair agreement (such as dementia or those who are intellectually deficient).
- A logger may simply never pay the landowner the money agreed.

== By region ==
=== Africa ===
==== Madagascar ====
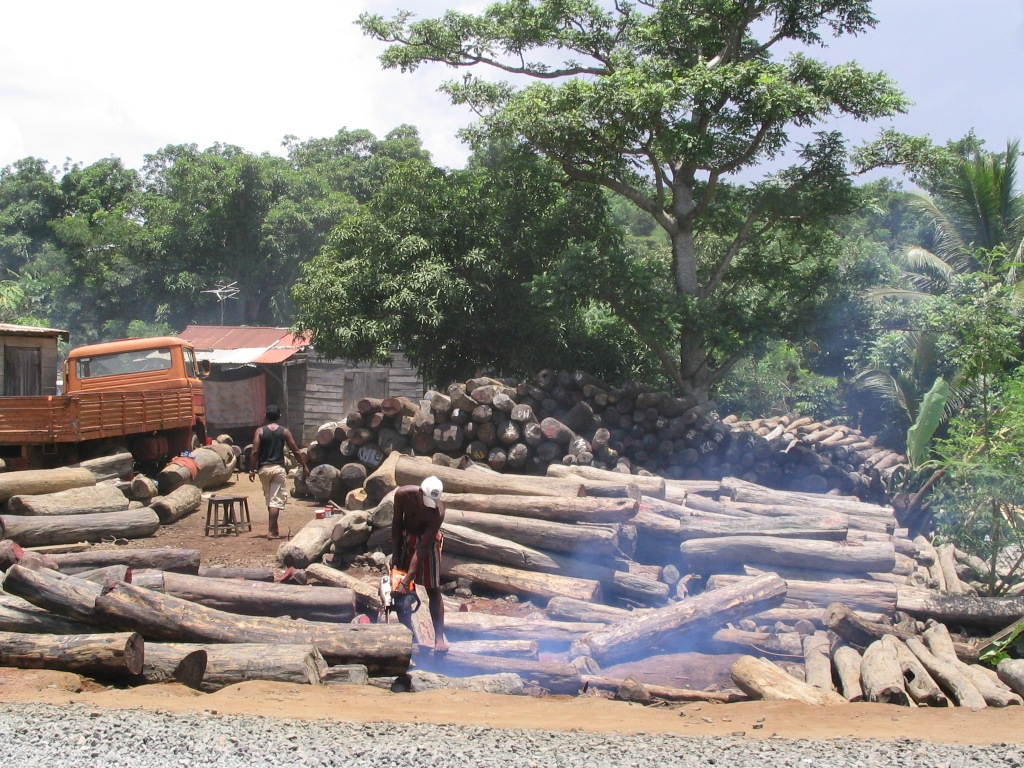
Rosewood is illegally logged from Masoala and Marojejy national parks, with the heaviest exploitation occurring after the 2009 political crisis.

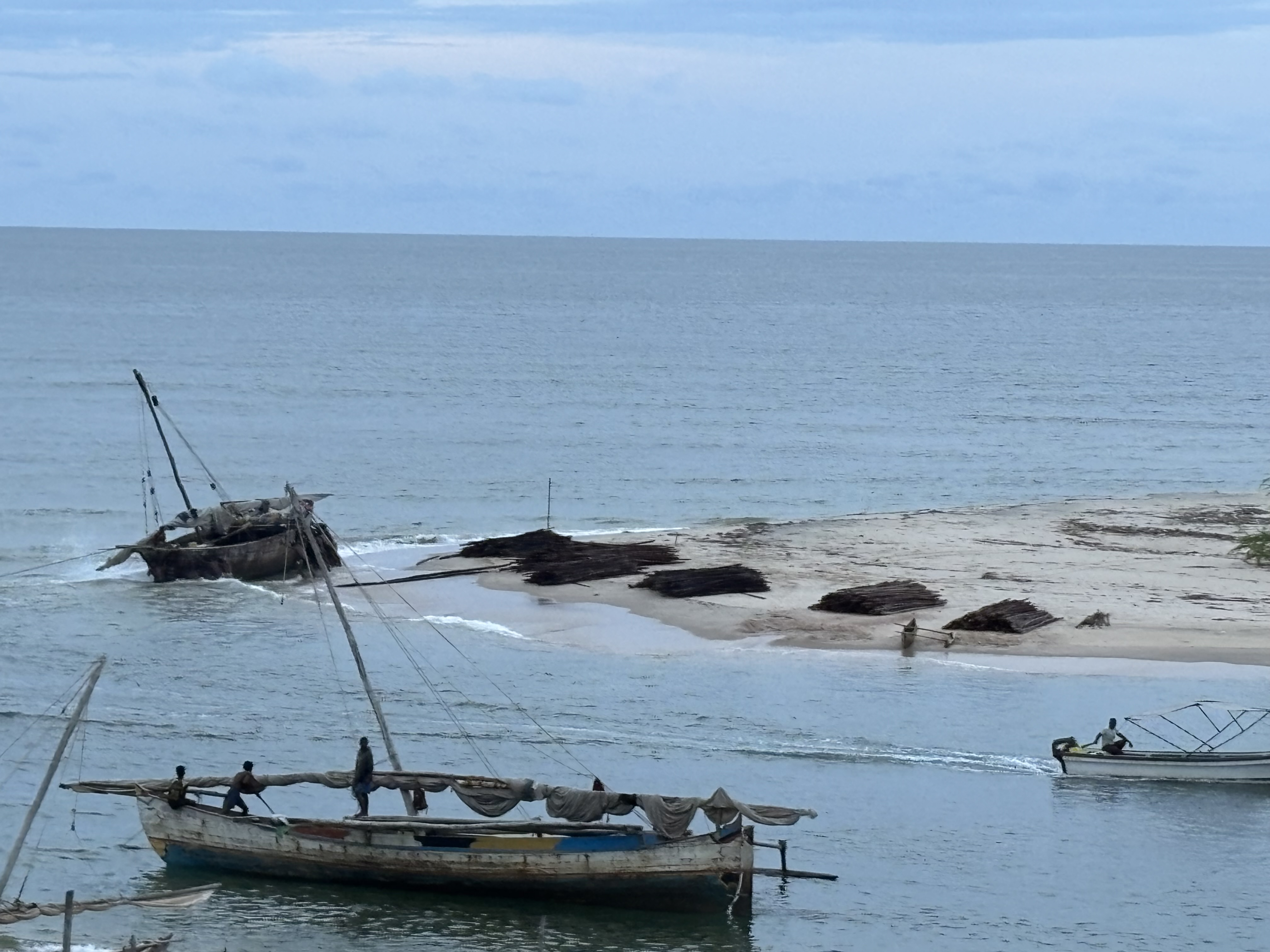
Smugglers in Mahajanga push a smuggling ship, with piles of illegal mangrove logs on the beach behind them

Illegal logging has been a problem in Madagascar for decades and is perpetuated by extreme poverty and government corruption. Often taking the form of selective logging, the trade has been driven by high international demand for expensive, fine-grained lumber such as rosewood and ebony. Historically, logging and exporting in Madagascar have been regulated by the Malagasy government, although the logging of rare hardwoods was explicitly banned from protected areas in 2000. Since then, government orders and memos have intermittently alternated between permitting and banning exports of precious woods. The most commonly cited reason for permitting exports is to salvage valuable wood from cyclone damage, although this reasoning has come under heavy scrutiny. This oscillating availability of Malagasy rosewood and other precious woods has created a market of rising and falling prices, allowing traders or "timber barons" to stockpile illegally sourced logs during periodic bans and then flood the market when the trade windows open and prices are high. Over 350,000 trees were illegally felled in Madagascar between 2010 and 2015, according to TRAFFIC.

==== Nigeria ====
The indiscriminate logging in the rainforest and uncontrolled felling of trees for fuel wood are reported to have had adverse effect on the environment. The loss of trees and other vegetation cover can cause temperature increase, fewer crops, flood, increased greenhouse gases within the atmosphere, ecological imbalance, soil erosion, and loss of biodiversity. The forest reserve in Nigeria spans approximately 10 million hectares, constituting over 10% of the total land area, which is around 96.2 million hectares or 923,768 square kilometers. The population was about 170,790 in 2006 (National Directorate of Employment, 2012). However, the expanse of marked forest lands has been gradually decreasing due to the rampant tree felling and activities of illegal loggers across the nation. For example, the Federal Department of Forestry (2010) estimated that Nigeria's forests are depleting at an annual rate of 3.5%. The country previously had around 20% of its area covered by natural forests, but this has dwindled to about 10%. The loss of approximately 60% of natural forests occurred due to encroachments for agriculture, extensive logging, and urbanization from the 1960s to the year 2000.

Notably, industrial and social development, contending for the same land areas occupied by forests, has not been praiseworthy. Nigeria, given its extensive land area, encompasses diverse and favorable climatic and ecological zones. The nation's significant size, diverse population, and socio-political and economic challenges have placed immense pressure on the forest belts. The rise in unemployed youth has revealed that looting forest products for survival presents an opportunity. Consequently, unemployment, a significant developmental challenge in Nigeria, has far-reaching adverse effects on environmental crime. Environmental crime often takes a back seat in priority in most developing nations, as there is a common belief that the forest belongs to everyone in the community. Furthermore, Nigeria's over-reliance on crude oil has led the government to place less emphasis on the annual losses from theft of forest produce. Regrettably, the government's attempts to implement effective measures to combat illegal logging have not yielded the desired results, with only 6% of the nation's land area designated as protected.

According to global data, a significant majority of unemployed individuals in developing regions, both in rural and urban areas, constitute about two-thirds of the total unemployed youth. In Nigeria, unemployment emerged as a pressing issue, particularly since the 1980s, a period marked by economic downturns due to plummeting world petroleum prices, devaluation of the Nigerian currency, rampant corruption, and a rapid increase in the country's population. These economic challenges had adverse effects on food production and led to escalating deforestation concerns. In regions that were rural or semi-urban and endowed with abundant forest trees and agricultural produce, the forests were readily accessed and exploited not only by locals but also by foreign criminal networks. Particularly alarming were the activities of illegal traders of forest products, often facilitated by foreigners seeking rare and hard wood species for European and American markets. This resulted in rampant destruction and felling of trees on both communal and individual farmlands.

From a scientific perspective, the destruction of these trees significantly impacts the carbon cycle and intensifies the greenhouse effect due to carbon depletion. The socio-economic losses to the nation, particularly concerning endangered species in the South-west and Mid-west forest zones of Nigeria (encompassing states such as Oyo, Ondo, Osun, Ogun, Ekiti, Edo, and Delta), are immeasurable. The rapid urbanization in Nigeria, coupled with escalating unemployment rates, persistent poverty, inequalities, inadequate social services, the presence of trans-national criminal organizations, widespread drug use and trafficking, and inadequately equipped security personnel and forest guards to combat illegal logging, lumbering cartels, clandestine markets, and sawmills for rare forest products, have driven many youths to explore opportunities in forest-related businesses.

Illegal logging, lumbering, and sawmilling can be understood as a system with diverse individuals and institutions involved in meeting the industry's supply and demand requirements, whether legitimate or illegitimate. Given the unemployment rate in the country, which currently stands at about 20.3 million jobless Nigerians (National Directorate of Employment, 2012), primarily youth, a crucial question arises: how are they sustaining themselves? Undoubtedly, deviant activities tend to thrive in such circumstances, especially in forested areas. The diversity and dynamics of crime and illegalities in the forest belt have received relatively little emphasis, often overshadowed by discussions about environmental degradation and climate change. This study delves into the patterns and trends of illegal wood logging, forest exploitation, and how youths adapt and survive in Nigeria's South-West forest belt.

=== Southeast Asia ===
==== Indonesia ====
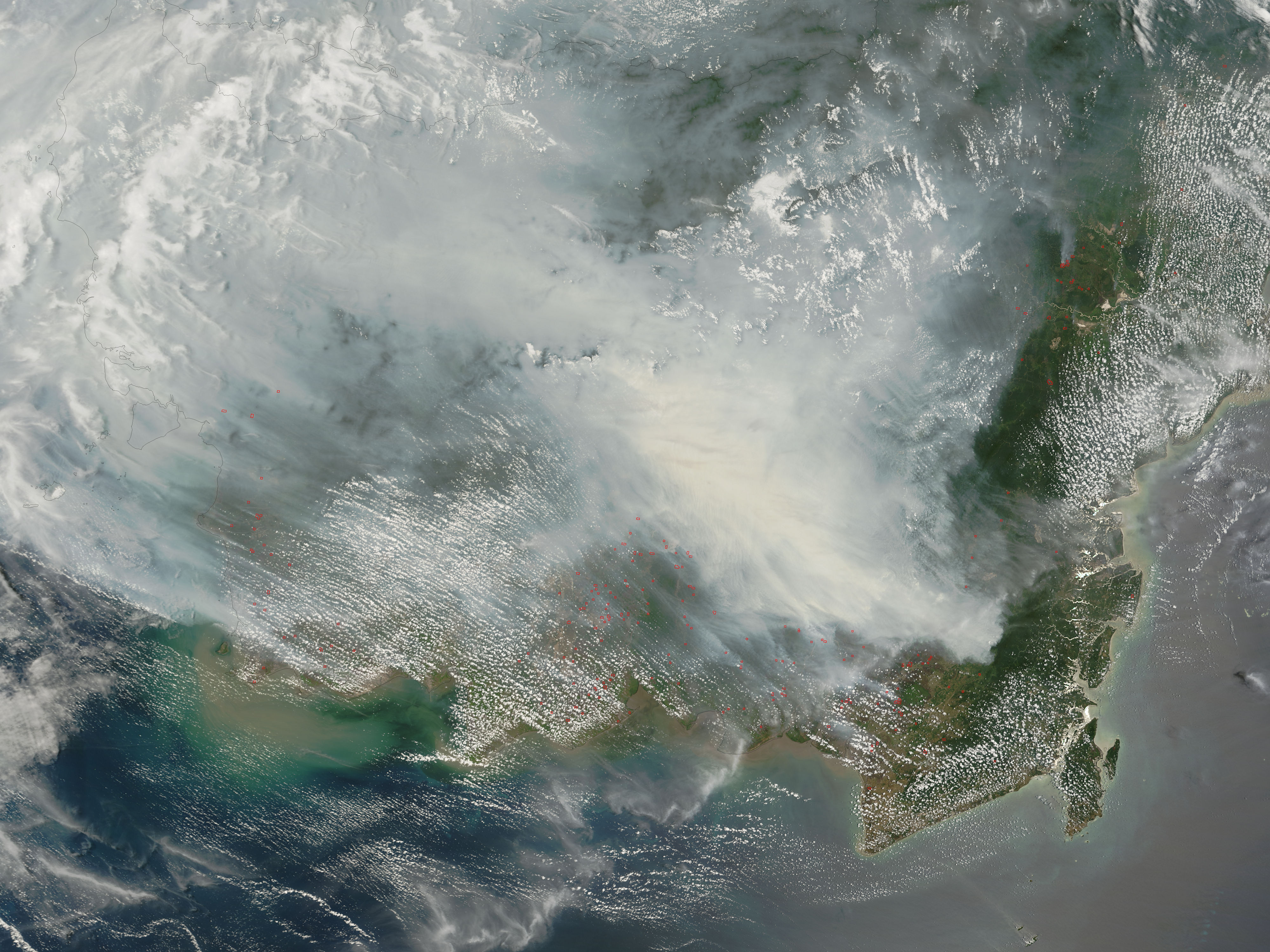
NASA's Terra satellite picture of thick smoke hung over the island of Borneo on 5 October 2006. The fires occur annually in the dry season (August–October), caused mainly by land-clearing and other agricultural fires, but fires escape control and burn into forests and peat-swamp areas.

A 2007 United Nations Environment Program report estimated that between 73% and 88% of timber logged in Indonesia is the result of illegal logging. Subsequent estimates were that between 40% and 55% of logged in Indonesia is the result of illegal logging. A 2021 study estimated that 81% of forest conversion for palm oil in Indonesia was illegal, and that Indonesia's Supreme Audit Agency determined that less than 20% of the nation's palm oil operations complied with national laws and regulations.

Malaysia is the key transit country for illegal wood products from Indonesia.

Private corporations, motivated by economic profits from local and regional market demands for timber, are culpable for deforestation. These agro-industrial companies often do not comply with the basic legal regulations by inappropriately employing cost effective yet environmentally inefficient deforestation methods such as forest fires to clear the land for agricultural purposes. The 1999 Forestry Law states that it is essential for companies to be endorsed by authorities in respective regions with an IPK permit, a timber harvesting permit, for legal approval of their deforestation activities. Many of these corporations could circumvent this red tape, maximise revenue profits by employing illegal logging activities as lax law enforcement and porous law regulations in large developing countries like Indonesia undermine forestry conservation efforts.

In the social landscape, small-scale subsistence farmers in rural areas, who received minimal education, employ a basic method of slash-and-burn to support their agricultural activities. This rudimentary agricultural technique involves the felling of forest trees before a dry season and, subsequently, the burning of these trees in the following dry season to provide fertilisers to support their crop activities. This agricultural practice is repetitively employed on the same plot of land until it is denuded of its nutrients and could no longer suffice to support agricultural yields. Thereafter, these farmers will move on to occupy another plot of land and continually practice their slash-and-burn technique. This contributing social factor to deforestation reinforces the challenges faced by forestry sustainability in developing countries such as Indonesia.

On the political front, the Indonesian governmental role in curbing deforestation has largely been criticised. Corruption amongst local Indonesian officials fuels cynicism with regard to the governmental clampdown on illegal logging activities. In 2008, the acquittal of a proprietor for a timber firm, Adelin Lis, alleged for illegal logging further galvanised public opinion and drew criticisms at the Indonesian political institution.

The Indonesian government grapples with the management of deforestation with sustainable urban development as rural-urban migration necessitates the expansion of cities. The lack of accountability to deforestation with pertinence to transmigration projects undertaken by the Indonesian government illustrates minimal supporting evidence to testify to considerations for forestry sustainability in their development projects. This further augments scepticism in the Indonesian government's credibility in efficiently and responsibly managing their urban development projects and forestry conservation efforts.

==== Myanmar ====
Due to the size and scope of Burma's forests, it is difficult for government organisations like Forest Department to regulate logging. There is a high demand for timber from Myanmar's neighbours–notably Thailand and China–who have depleted their forests much more than Myanmar. As a result, numerous illegal logging operations have sprung up near the Thai-Burmese border and in the province of Kachin along the Chinese border. Logs are commonly cut on the Burmese side and then smuggled to processing facilities in China or Thailand.

Lack of regulations has led to unbridled and destructive logging that has caused environmental damage such as soil erosion, river contamination, and increased flooding. In Kachin State, which has some of the largest expanses of relatively untouched forest, illegal logging accounts for up to half of the deforestation. Due to the remoteness of these regions and the international demand for hardwoods, illegal logging is a threat that is hard to address and will probably continue contributing to deforestation. A major problem is that illegal logging is still classified in Myanmar as an environmental matter, and not as a criminal act, making it difficult for the Forest Department to bring a lawsuit against the offenders.

==== Cambodia ====
Illegal logging poses a large threat to Cambodia's forests. It allows for undocumented and unauthorized deforestation in which allows for the exploitation of Cambodia's forests. There are many cases in which the military carries out illegal logging without knowledge from the government. It is difficult for central government officials to visit areas still controlled by former Pol Pot forces. Illegal commercial timber interests take advantage of weak law enforcement to benefit from illegal cutting. The majority of illegal deforestation is done by the military and powerful sub-contractors.

==== Thailand ====
Governmental officials in charge of protected areas have contributed to deforestation by allowing illegal logging and illegal timber trading. King Bhumibol Adulyadej has blamed the destruction of Thailand's forested areas on the greed of some state officials. This is evident in places such as large protected swathes of northern Nan Province that were formerly covered with virgin forest and that have been deforested even while having national park status. Given that a mature, 30 year-old Siamese rosewood tree can fetch 300,000 baht on the black market, illegal logging is unlikely to disappear.

== Statistics ==
The scale of illegal logging represents a major loss of revenue to many countries and can lead to widespread associated environmental damage. A senate committee in the Philippines estimated that the country lost as much as US$1.8bn per year during the 1980s. The Indonesian government estimated in 2002 that costs related to illegal logging are US$3bn each year. The World Bank estimates that illegal logging costs timber-producing countries between 10 and 15 billion euros per year. This compares with 10 billion euros disbursed as EC aid in 2002.

- A joint UK-Indonesian study of the timber industry in Indonesia in 1998 suggested that about 40% of throughput was illegal, with a value in excess of $365 million. More recent estimates, comparing legal harvesting against known domestic consumption plus exports, suggest that 88% of logging in the country is illegal in some way. Malaysia is the key transit country for illegal wood products from Indonesia.
- In Brazil, 80% of logging in the Amazon violates government controls. At the core of illegal logging is widespread corruption. Often referred to as 'green gold', mahogany can fetch over US$1,600 m-3. Illegal mahogany facilitates the illegal logging of other species, and widespread exploitation of the Brazilian Amazon. Recent Greenpeace investigations in the Brazilian state of Pará reveal just how deeply rooted the problem remains. No reliable legal chain of custody exists for mahogany, and the key players in its trade are ruthless.
- The World Bank estimates that 80% of logging operations are illegal in Bolivia and 42% in Colombia, 10 while in Peru, illegal logging constitutes 80% of all activities.
- Research carried out by WWF International in 2002 shows that in Africa, rates of illegal logging vary from 50% for Cameroon and Equatorial Guinea to 70% in Gabon and 80% in Liberia – where revenues from the timber industry also fuelled the civil war.
- WWF estimates that illegal logging in Russia is at least 20%, reaching up to 50% in its far eastern regions.
- A 2012 joint study by the United Nations Environment Programme and Interpol states that illegal logging accounts for up to 30% of the global logging trade and contributes to more than 50% of tropical deforestation in Central Africa, the Amazon Basin and South East Asia.
- Between 50% and 90% of logging from the key countries in these regions is being carried out by organised criminal entities.
- A study conducted by TRAFFIC found that 93% of all timber exported from Mozambique to China in 2013 was done so illegally.
- As of 2020, Interpol states that every year 10 million hectares of forest are lost to illegal logging across the globe. They also state that the illicit wood sector is worth almost $152 billion per year and up to one-third of all wood furniture is made from illegally sourced timber.

In March 2004, Greenpeace carried out actions against a cargo ship transporting timber from the Indonesian company Korindo, which was being imported into France, UK, Belgium and the Netherlands. Korindo is known to be using illegal timber from the last rainforests of Indonesia. In May 2003, an Indonesian Government investigation confirmed that Korindo was receiving illegal timber from notorious timber barons known to obtain timber from an orang-utan refuge – the Tanjung Puting National Park. Tanjung Puting National Park is a 4,000-square-kilometre conservation area of global importance. It is recognized as a world biosphere reserve by the United Nations and forms the largest protected area of swamp forest in South-East Asia.

== Mitigation ==
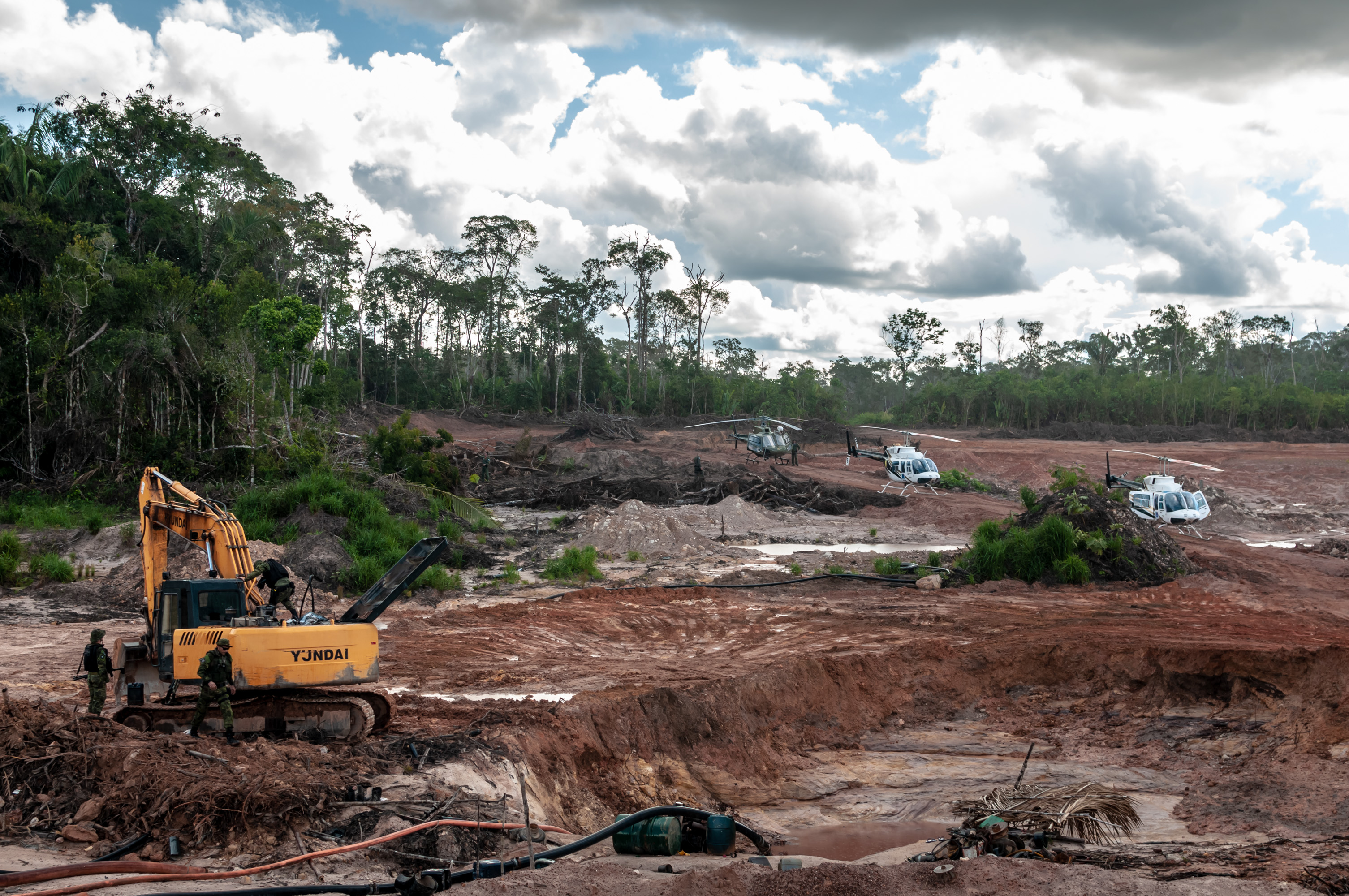
Agents from IBAMA, Brazil's environmental police, in the fight against illegal logging in Indigenous territory, 2018

=== North Asia ===
The Europe and North Asia Forest Law Enforcement and Governance (ENA FLEG) Ministerial Conference was held in Saint Petersburg, Russia on 22–25 November 2005. In May 2004, the Russian Federation announced its intention to host the ENA FLEG process, supported by the World Bank. A preparatory conference was held in Moscow in June 2005.

The Saint Petersburg conference brought together nearly 300 participants representing 43 governments, the private sector, civil society, and international organizations. It agreed to the Saint Petersburg Declaration on Forest Law Enforcement and Governance in Europe and North Asia. The Declaration includes an indicative list of actions, intended to serve as a general framework for possible actions to be undertaken by governments as well as civil society.

The conference took place as the United Kingdom prepared to pass the G8 Presidency to Russia. As Valery Roshchupkin, Head of the Federal Forestry Agency of the Russian Federation, confirmed, illegal logging would be of special importance for Russia as the G8 President and for the following G8 Summit, also held in Saint Petersburg.

=== East Asia ===
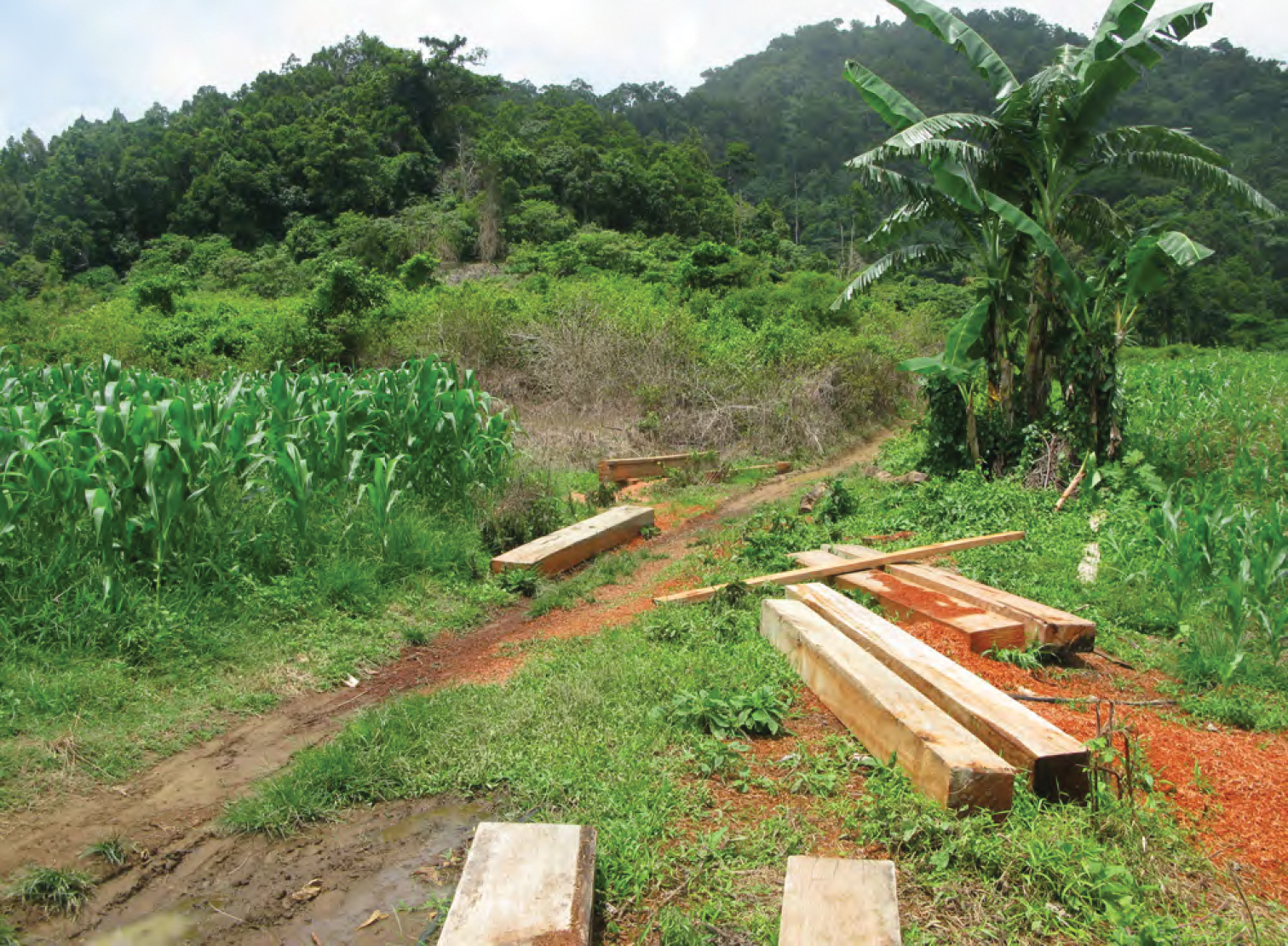
Signs of illegal timber poaching on the boundary of the protected area around the Cagua Volcano, Cagayan, Philippines

The East Asia Forest Law Enforcement and Governance (EA FLEG) Ministerial Conference took place in Bali in September 2001. The Conference brought together nearly 150 participants from 20 countries, representing government, international organizations, NGOs, and the private sector. The event was co-hosted by the World Bank and the Government of Indonesia. The meeting included detailed technical discussions of forest law enforcement in relation to governance, forest policy and forest management as well as ministerial engagement.

The Conference's primary aims were to share analysis on forest law enforcement; explore priority issues of forest law enforcement, including illegal logging in the East Asia region, among senior officials from the forest and related ministries, NGOs, and industry representatives; and commit to action at the national and regional level.

=== European Union ===
In May 2003, the European Commission presented the EU Forest Law Enforcement, Governance and Trade Action Plan (EU FLEGT). This marked the beginning of a long process by which the EU aims to develop and implement measures to address illegal logging and related trade. The primary means of implementing the Plan is through Voluntary Partnership Agreements with timber producing countries. The European Union Timber Regulation was adopted in 2010 and went into effect 3 March 2013.

- It prohibits the placing on the EU market for the first time of illegally harvested timber and products derived from such timber;
- It requires EU traders who place timber products on the EU market for the first time to exercise 'due diligence';
- Once on the market, the timber and timber products may be sold on and/or transformed before they reach the final consumer.
- To facilitate the traceability of timber products, economic operators in this part of the supply chain (referred to as traders in the regulation) have an obligation to keep records of their suppliers and customers.

A Greenpeace investigation published in May 2014 demonstrates that EU Timber Regulation is ineffective if fraudulent paperwork is accepted at face value and there is not sufficient enforcement by EU authorities.

=== Africa ===
The Africa Forest Law Enforcement and Governance (AFLEG) Ministerial Conference was held in Yaoundé, Cameroon, in October 2003. The meeting drew together ministers and stakeholders from Africa, Europe, and North America to consider how partnerships between producers, consumers, donors, civil society and the private sector could address illegal forest exploitation and associated trade in Africa.

The AFLEG conference, the second regional forest law enforcement and governance meeting after East Asia, resulted in endorsement of a ministerial declaration and action plan as well as a variety of informal implementation initiatives.

In 2014, the FAU-EU-FLEGT Programme of the Food and Agriculture Organization of the United Nations published the study The Voluntary Partnership Agreement (VPA) process in Central and West Africa: from theory to practice to document and foster strategic reflection in partner countries already engaged in negotiating a VPA - or those who will be entering into such negotiations - by providing examples of good practices. These good practices were identified and recorded following interviews with the main stakeholders in the eight VPA countries in West and Central Africa, the European Forest Institute's (EFI) EU FLEGT Facility and the European Commission. In 2016, the FAO-EU FLEGT Programme published an additional study, Traceability: a management tool for business and governments, providing examples of good practices in the region's traceability systems, which help prevent illegal logging by tracking timber from its forest of origin throughout its journey along the supply chain.

=== United States ===
In response to growing concerns over illegal logging and advice from TRAFFIC and other organisations, on 22 May 2008, the U.S. amended the Lacey Act, when the Food, Conservation, and Energy Act of 2008 expanded its protection to a broader range of plants and plant products (Section 8204. Prevention of Illegal Logging Practices).

The requirements under the new Amendments are two-fold. First, the Lacey Act now makes it illegal to import into the United States plants that have been harvested contrary to any applicable Federal Law, State Law, Indian Tribal Law, or Foreign Law. If a plant is found to have been harvested in violation of the laws of the country where it was harvested, that plant would be subject to seizure and forfeiture if imported into the U.S. The Lacey Act also makes it unlawful, beginning 15 December 2008, to import certain plants and plant products without a Plant and Plant Product import declaration.

This Plant and Plant Product Declaration must contain (besides other information) the Genus, Species, and Country of Harvest of every plant found in commercial shipments of certain products, a list of applicable products (along with other requirements and guidance) can be found on the USDA APHIS website.

== See also ==
- Deforestation and climate change
- Environmental impact of roads
- Environmental Investigation Agency
- European Anti-Fraud Office
- Environmental vandalism
- List of environmental issues
- Reducing emissions from deforestation and forest degradation (REDD)
- Timber mafia
- United Nations Forum on Forests
- Teak in Myanmar
