= Alex Quilici =

American engineer and businessman

Alex Quilici is an American engineer and businessman. He is a national source of information about robocalls for consumer protection groups, the Federal Communications Commission (FCC). The FCC's staff, congregational legislators and their telecom staff, and national media also look to him for information.

Quilici graduated from the University of California, Berkeley and received a PhD in computer science from UCLA. From 1991 to 1999, he was a freelance technical consultant and faculty member at the University of Hawaiʻi at Mānoa.

Quilici was a co-founder of the Pittsburgh-based voice portal infrastructure company Quackware along with Steven Woods and Jeromy Carriere. Quilici helped bring Quack.com from being a start-up with three founders to a company which employed 125 professionals in the first 18 months. In 1999, it became Quack.com and moved to Silicon Valley; in September 2000 it was acquired by America Online, eventually becoming AOLbyPhone. Quilici joined AOL as a VP as part of the Quack.com acquisition, and founded the AOL voice services division at AOL. He was a member of the board of directors of NeoEdge Networks.

Quilici's six-year tenure as a vice-president with America Online was a vital one to the company as a whole. He was integral to creating and growing America Online's voice services. He helped America Online acquire one million paying customers for their voice services yielding fifty million dollars annually in revenue. He was the vice president and chief product officer of America Online by Phone.

Quilici became a professor of electrical engineering at the University of Hawaii at Manoa before joining NeoEdge Networks and becoming a director for Youmail Inc. in April 2007. He currently serves on the strategic advisory board of Jefferson Partners and is also a member of the Tech Coast Angels.

Quilici has extensive experience in the tech industry and helping the industry overall develop new products and technology. He is known for his ability to bring heightened research while keeping user practicalities. He has set a precedent by using artificial intelligence to solve software problems in products.

Quilici joined YouMail as its CEO in 2007. In November 2015, he and the company launched the YouMail Robocall Index, to track legal and illegal robocall traffic across the United States. The YouMail Robocall Index is a unique online portal which provides a monthly estimate of the volumes and types of robocalls nationwide, and for each specific state, city and area code. The initial report indicated at the time that 1 out of every 6 calls received in the US was generated by a machine.
