= Quilici =

Quilici is a surname of Italian origin. Notable people with the name include:

- Alex Quilici, American engineer and businessman
- Brando Quilici, Italian filmmaker
- Folco Quilici (1930–2018), Italian film director and screenwriter
- Frank Quilici (1939–2018), American baseball infielder and manager
- Giovanni Battista Quilici (1791–1844), Italian Roman Catholic priest
