= Luis Villalobos =

Luis Villalobos may refer to:

- Luis Villalobos (investor)
- Luis Villalobos (cyclist)
