= Jeromy Carriere =

Canadian computer software engineer

Steven Jeromy Carrière is a Canadian computer software engineer.

Carrière is a graduate of the University of Waterloo in Canada. He was technical staff member at Carnegie Mellon University's Software Engineering Institute working on practical software architectural reconstruction and analysis.

In 1998 Carrière co-founded Pittsburgh-based voice portal infrastructure company Quackware with Steven Woods and Alex Quilici. In 1999 Quackware became Quack.com and moved to Silicon Valley. In September 2000, Quack was acquired for an estimated $200 million by America Online.

Carrière left America Online in 2002 to co-found Web 2.0 startup Kinitos (later renamed NeoEdge Networks). In 2003, Jeromy left Kinitos to join Microsoft as a senior architect advisor. From 2005 through 2007 he worked for Fidelity Investments, in Boston, USA, in their enterprise application architecture group. Subsequent to this Jeromy went on to senior technical leadership positions with Vistaprint, Yahoo, eBay, Google, Facebook, and most recently Datadog.

Jeromy has been the recipient of numerous awards. In June 2007 Carrière was awarded an honorary doctorate from Algoma University College in Sault Ste. Marie, Ontario, Canada.

In spring of 2014 Carrière was recognized with the prestigious J.W. Graham Medal for Computing and Innovation by the University of Waterloo.

== See also ==
- List of University of Waterloo people
