= HitFix =

Entertainment news website (2008–2021)

HitFix, Inc.
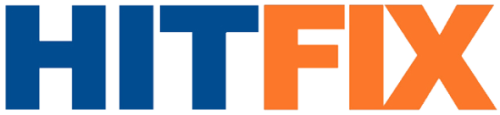
- Company type: Wholly owned brand of Woven Digital
- Website type: Entertainment news
- Available in: English
- Founded: December 2008; 17 years ago
- Dissolved: 2021; 5 years ago
- Successor: Uproxx (pre-existing website of owner)
- Headquarters: Los Angeles, California, United States
- Area served: Worldwide
- Website: www.hitfix.com (defunct)

HitFix, or HitFix.com, was an entertainment news website that launched in December 2008 specializing in breaking entertainment news, insider information, and reviews and critiques of film, music, and television. In mid-2010 HitFix crossed the 1,000,000 unique users per month milestone.

HitFix had been cited as a source by Time, Los Angeles Times, HuffPost, E! Online, and The Daily Herald.

In April 2016, it became a brand of Woven Digital and is now a part of the Woven Digital property Uproxx. In November 2016 the website switched from standalone to a redirect to Uproxx.

== Founders ==
HitFix was founded by ex-Reed Business Information Development executive Jen Sargent and former L.A. Times and MSN.com film editor Gregory Ellwood. Sargent and Ellwood's goal was to create a site that fit into the gap between trade publications and gossip- or celebrity-scandal-driven sites, such as TMZ, and to target an audience slightly skewed towards males – a unique approach in a female-driven industry – while catering to 18- to 34-year-olds.

== Angel investment ==
HitFix received its first funding from Golden Seeds, the fourth largest angel investment group in the United States, in 2009. Since then, HitFix has twice benefited from investment from the Tech Coast Angels, one of the largest angel investment networks in Southern California. The first such investment came in February 2009 in the amount of $850,000. In June 2010, the Angels added to their commitment investing an additional $1,600,000. In addition to Golden Seeds and Tech Coast Angels, HitFix investors include HBS Angels, Liquid Capital, and Gordon Crawford.

== Contributors ==
=== Gregory Ellwood ===
In addition to being one of its co-founders, Ellwood reported on movies and awards for HitFix.

=== Drew McWeeny ===
Formerly known as "Moriarty", McWeeny previously wrote for Ain't It Cool News. In addition to being a screenwriter and movie critic, McWeeny covered the movie industry for HitFix. McWeeny announced his move to HitFix in 2008 in a review of The Curious Case of Benjamin Button.

On September 20, 2016, McWeeny announced via Twitter that he would no longer be working for Hitfix.

=== Alan Sepinwall ===
After 14 years at The Star-Ledger, Sepinwall—also known for his blog, "What's Alan Watching"—moved to HitFix full-time in April 2010. Last spring, NBC executives went so far as to credit Sepinwall by name for his role in earning a renewal for Chuck. Slate credited Sepinwall with having "changed the nature of television criticism".

== See also ==
- The A.V. Club
- Blogcritics
