= Steven Woods =

Canadian entrepreneur

Steven Gregory Woods
- Born: June 16, 1965 (age 61); Melfort, Saskatchewan
- Occupations: Google site director in Waterloo, Canada. Former Quack.com Co-founder and NeoEdge Co-founder & Director.

Steven Gregory Woods (born June 16, 1965) is a Canadian entrepreneur. He is best known for co-founding Quack.com, the first popular Voice portal platform, in 1998. Woods became the head of engineering for Google Canada where he was until 2021, when he joined Canadian Venture capital firm iNovia Capital as partner and CTO, following in the footsteps of Patrick Pichette, Google's CFO who also joined iNovia after leaving Google.

== Career ==
Born in Melfort, Saskatchewan, Woods holds a Ph.D. and M.Math. from the David R. Cheriton School of Computer Science at the University of Waterloo in Canada and a B.Sc. from the University of Saskatchewan. He was the first Ph.D. student of Professor Qiang Yang. Woods' Ph.D. was published in 1997 as a book co-written with Alex Quilici and Qiang Yang entitled "Constraint-Based Design Recovery for Software Reengineering: Theory and Experiments" He then worked for Carnegie Mellon's Software Engineering Institute on product line development and practical software architectural reconstruction and analysis.

In 1998 Woods co-founded Pittsburgh-based voice-portal infrastructure company Quackware with Jeromy Carriere and Alex Quilici. Quackware became Quack.com in 1999 and moved headquarters to Silicon Valley. It was funded September 1, 1999, and acquired August 31, 2000 by America Online. Quack.com claimed to be the first Voice Portal, and held patents around interactive voice applications, including "System and method for voice access to internet-based information".

Woods was vice president of voice services for America Online and Netscape after the acquisition of Quack.com in September, 2000.

He founded NeoEdge in 2002 under the name Kinitos along with former America Online, Netscape, and Quack.com colleagues including Jeromy Carriere. He served as an officer and on the board of directors from 2001 through 2010 in Palo Alto, California.

Woods was the engineering director for Google in Canada from 2008 to 2021, where he joined Canadian Venture capital firm iNovia Capital as partner and CTO.

== Achievements ==
While at the University of Waterloo, Woods captained the varsity Waterloo Warriors golf team and in 1995 was co-winner of the Ontario University Athletics "Len Shore Trophy" for top individual performance. During 1991-1992 Woods was a member of the Canberra Knights semi-professional ice hockey in the Australian Ice Hockey League. Woods was awarded the J.W. Graham Medal for Computing and Innovation by the University of Waterloo in 2010.

== See also ==
- List of University of Waterloo people
