= HS Timber Group =

HS Timber Group as of 12/2/2019
- Type: LLC
- Industry: Wood, Manufacturing
- Founded: 2002 (in the present structure)
- Headquarters: Vienna, Austria (Schweighofer Group, Holding); Bucharest, Romania (Holzindustrie Schweighofer)
- Key people: Gerald Schweighofer, Jürgen Bergner, Christian Frühwald, Martin Louda
- Products: timber, construction wood, glue lam products, blockboards, concrete formwork panels, pellets, DIY- wood products
- Revenue: appr. 1.171 bn Euro in wood business (2022)
- Number of employees: more than 2,700
- Website: https://hs.at/

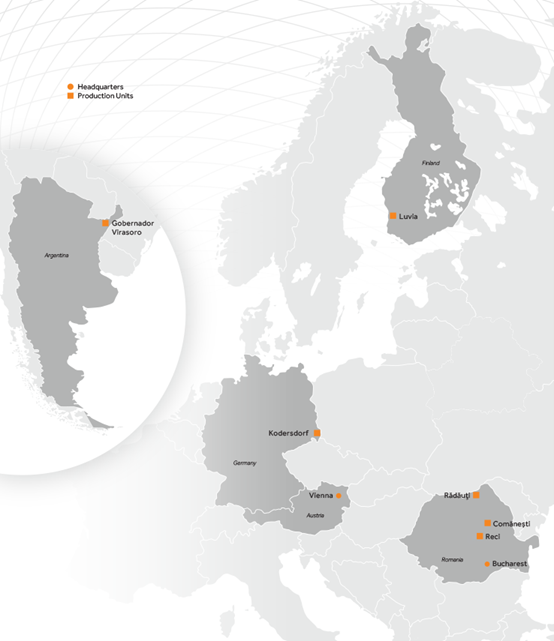
Production Units

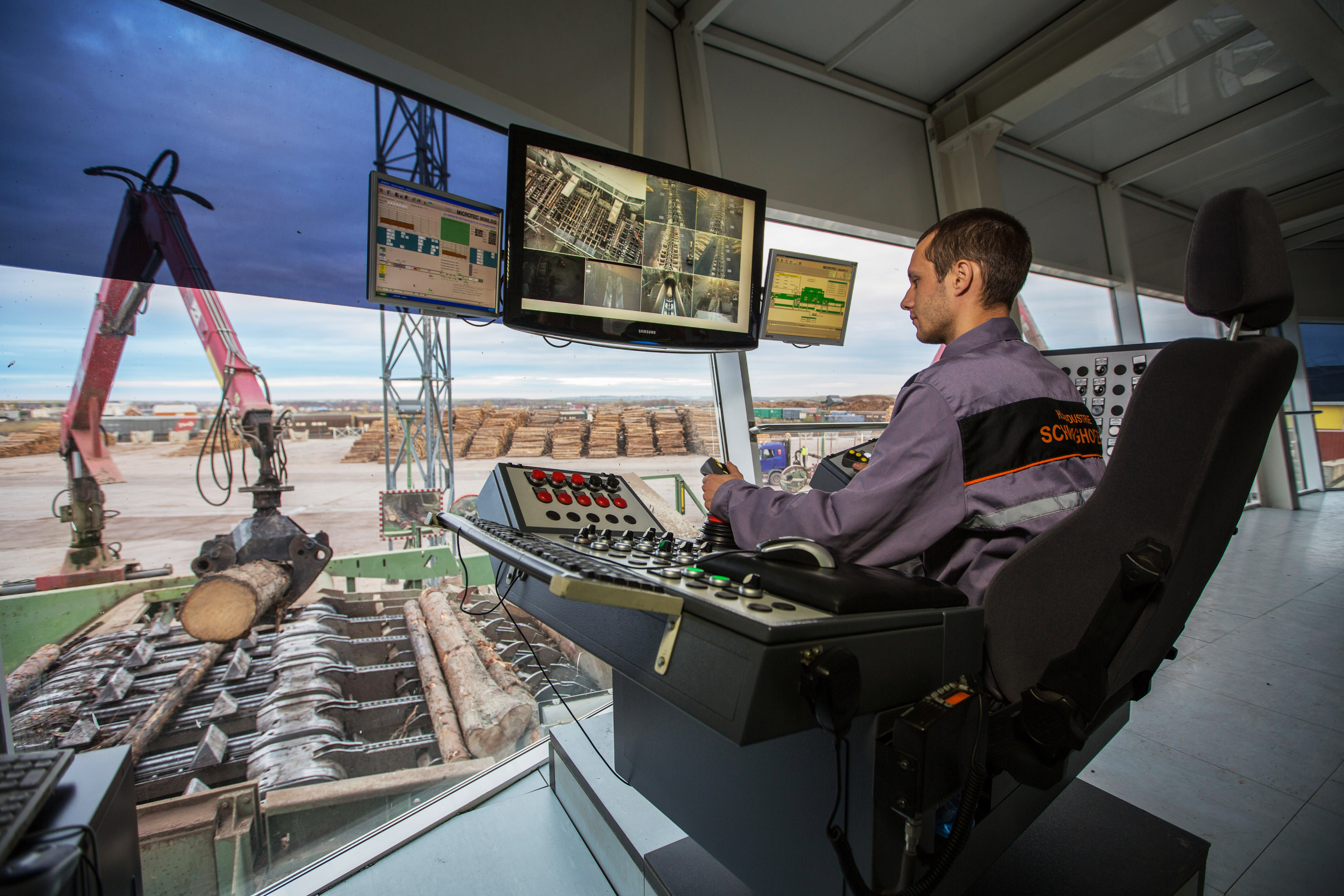
Sawmill operator, Romania.

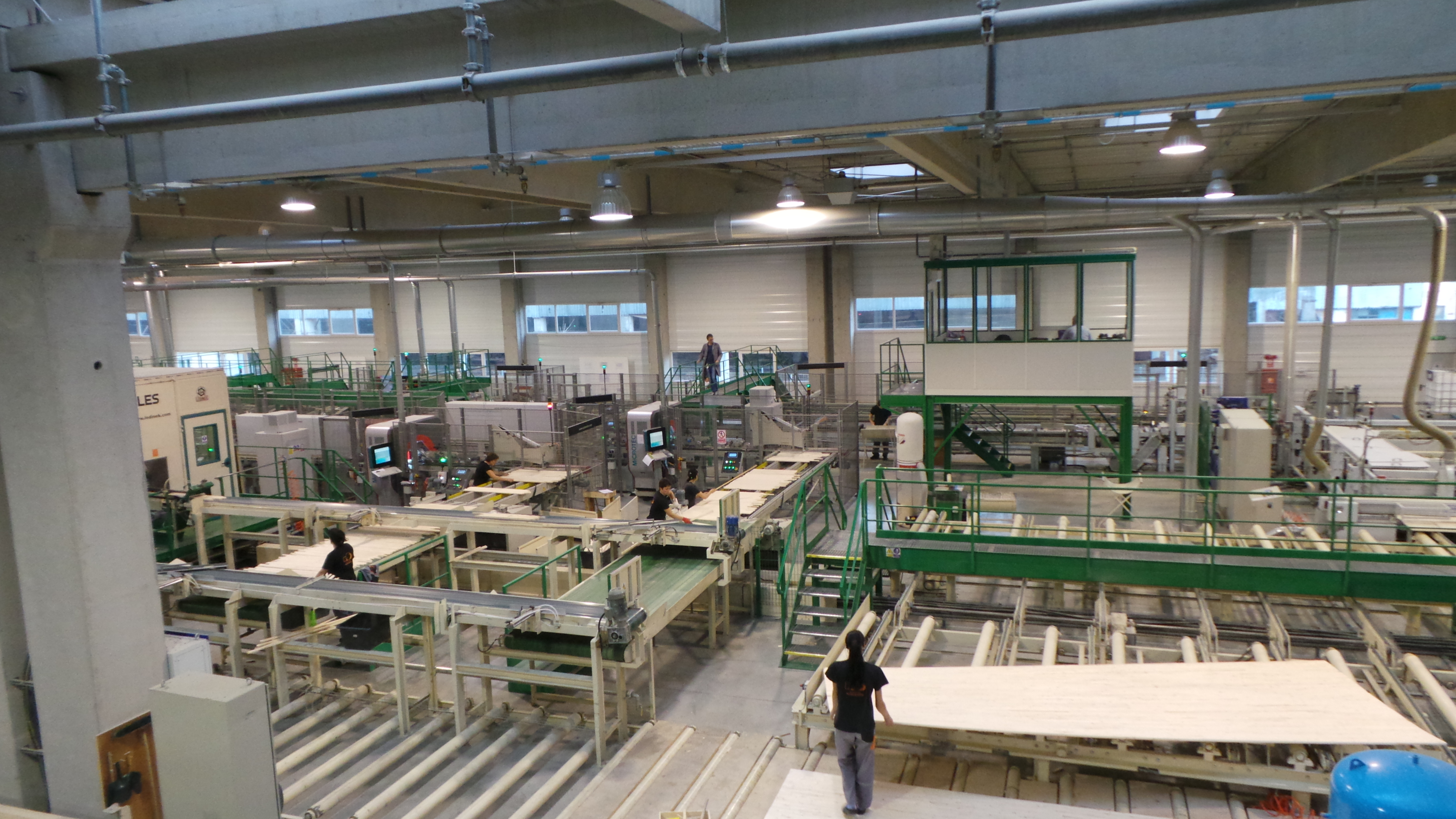
Inside a blockboard factory in Comănești, Romania.

HS Timber Group is an Austrian-based company operating in the wood processing industry, lumber trading and bioenergy production. It is one of the leading woodworking businesses in Europe and employs more than 2,700 people in its headquarters and seven global production units.

HS Timber is owned by Evergreen Privatstiftung, a private foundation based in Austria.

== Business areas ==
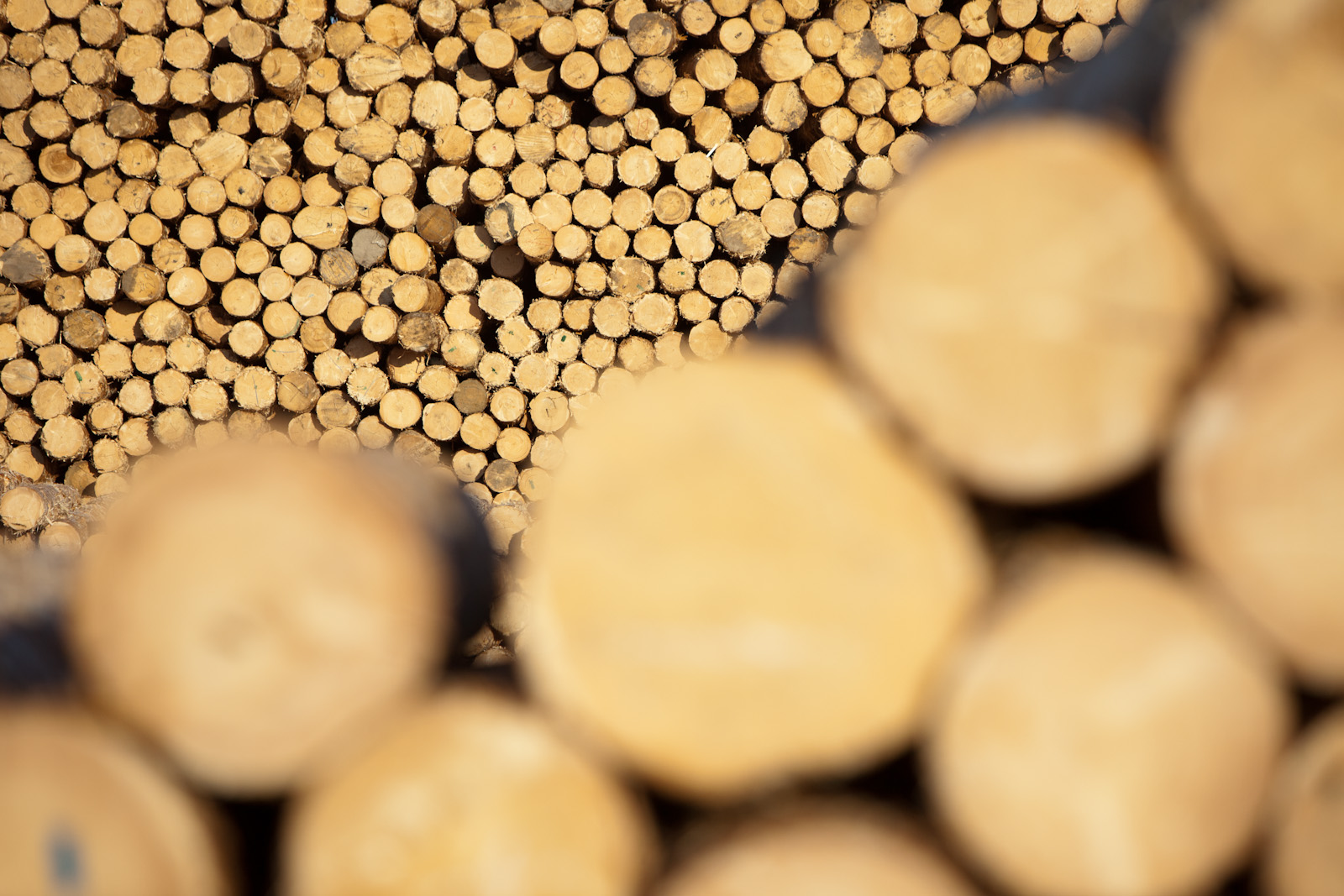
Storage of round timber.

The core businesses of HS Timber Group are:

- Production and processing of wood products
- Production of bioenergy
- Trade of wood products

=== Wood industry ===
The key business of HS Timber Group is the wood processing industry with seven global production units. Beside sawmills, HS Timber Group runs a blockboard factory and a post & beam production. Main products are timber, construction and packaging timber, planed (semi)finished timber, profiled timber, glue lam products, finger jointed products, blockboards, concrete formwork panels and pellets.

=== Bioenergy production ===
HS Timber Group runs bioenergy power plants in most of its sawmills. In these CHP (cogeneration heat and power plants) bark is used for the generation of heat and green energy. HS Timber also used to hold shares of the biomass power plant in Suceava, Romania.

=== Timber trade ===
Schweighofer holds shares of the wood trading company DABG, Dr. Anna Bauthen GmbH. This subsidiary company is active in timber trading – focusing on North Africa and Middle East.

=== Past business activities ===
In the past the group also operated a viscose pulp production in Austria and until 2018 the group owned forests in the Czech Republic and Romania.

== Production units ==
At present HS Timber Group operates three production units in Romania: One sawmill in Reci (Covasna county) and two factories for blockboard and glue lam products in Comănești and Radauti. Furthermore, the company operates a sawmill in Kodersdorf in Germany and a Finnish sawmill in Luvia. Another sawmill is under construction in Argentina and will soon start operations.

=== Sawmill Rădăuți ===
The factory in Romania was opened in 2008. The sawmill was closed in 2022. The post and beam production is still in operation.

=== Sawmill Reci ===
The sawmill in Reci, Covasna County, commenced operations in August 2015, following a 150 million euro investment. The production unit spans over 70 hectares and has a cutting capacity of 800.000 m^{3} round wood. The factory employs 520.

=== Sawmill Kodersdorf ===
In 2015 the Schweighofer Group took over the sawmill in Kodersdorf (Germany) from the Klausner Group. All employees were hired by Holzindustrie Schweighofer. The factory processes spruce and pine. Its annual cutting capacity is 1.2 million m³ of logs.

=== Blockboard factory Comănești ===
In 2010 Schweighofer took over the blockboard production factory from Finnforest in Comănești. With 760 employees and its annual production volume (135.000 m³ blockboards) it is the world's largest blockboard production in one location.

=== Sawmill Luvia ===
In April 2022 HS Timber Group took over the Finnish sawmill Luvian Saha Oy. The company in the west of Finland that has been operating since 1976, employs around 120 people, and has a plant size of 19.6 ha. The mill cuts and processes coniferous roundwood, 70% of which is spruce and 30% pine.

=== Sawmill Argentina ===
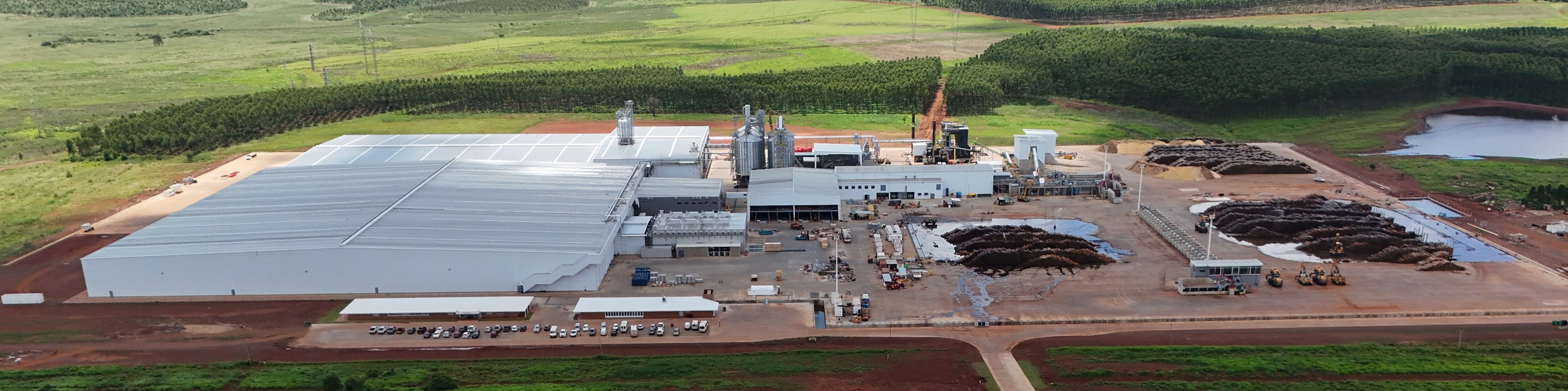
Aerial view of the sawmill in Virasoro, Argentina

HS Timber Group has built a new sawmill in Gobernador Virasoro in Argentina in a joint venture with the Belgian company Forestcape. The investment is worth around US$100 million. The company officially commissioned the sawmill in Argentina in April 2024.

=== Kolomyia (plot) ===
In Kolomyja in Ukraine, the HS Timber Group had plans to build a new sawmill on an area of 35 ha. The project is not being pursued any further at present.

=== Former Production Sites ===
==== Edge glued panels factory Siret ====
The edge glued panels factory in Siret was taken over from the IKEA-subsidiary company Swedwood in 2009. Operations were discontinued as of 30 March 2022.

==== Sawmill Sebeș ====
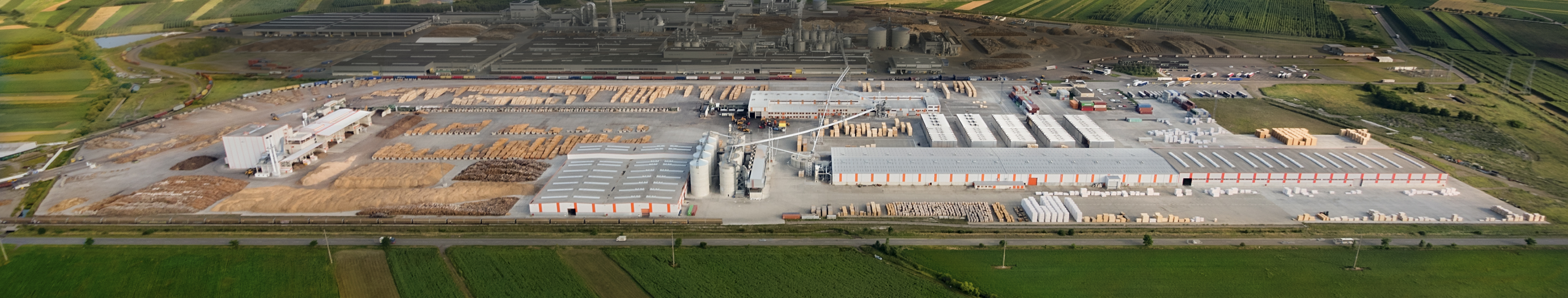
Aerial view of Rădăuți, Romania.

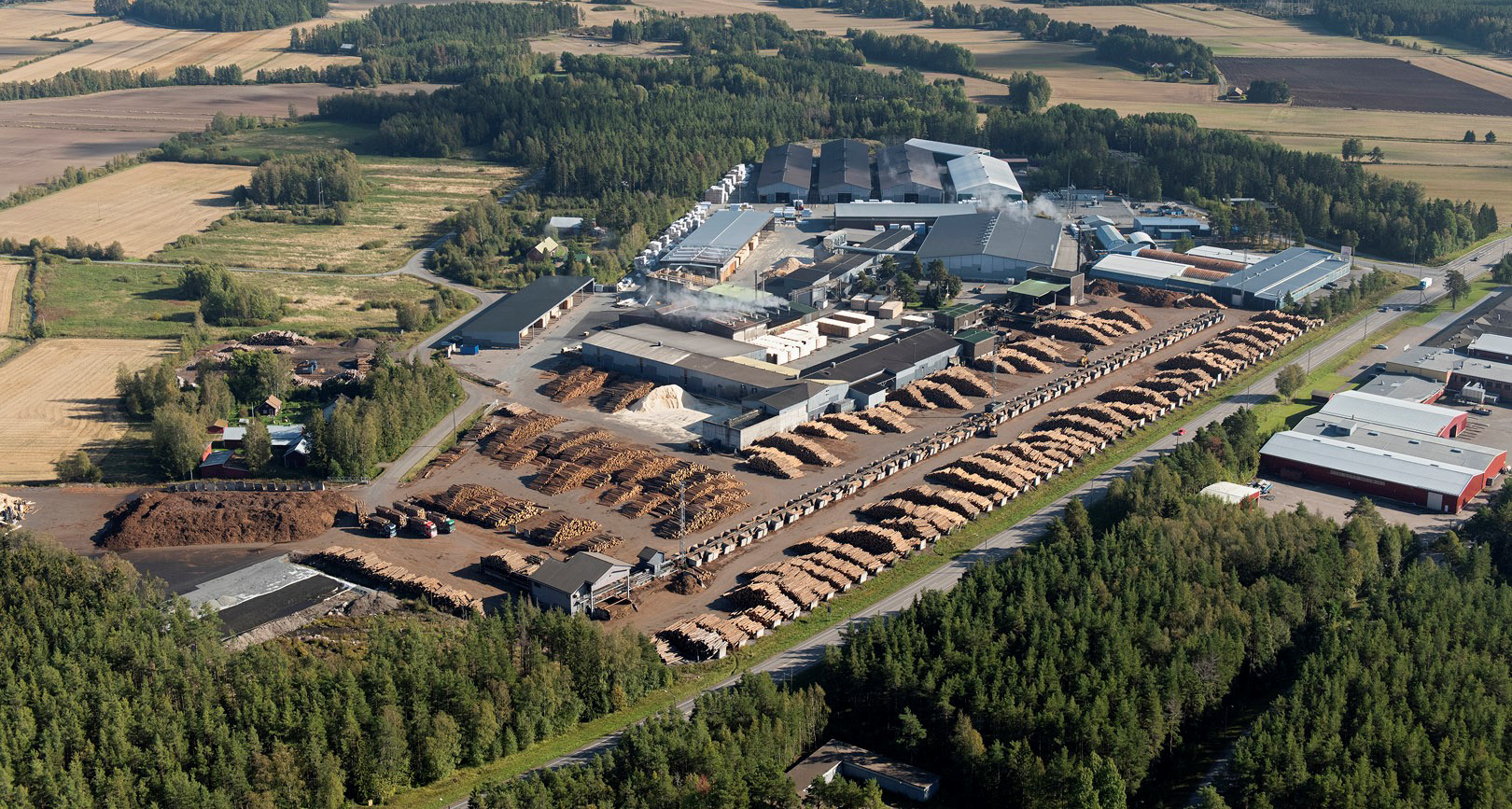
Aerial view of the sawmill in Luvia, Finland

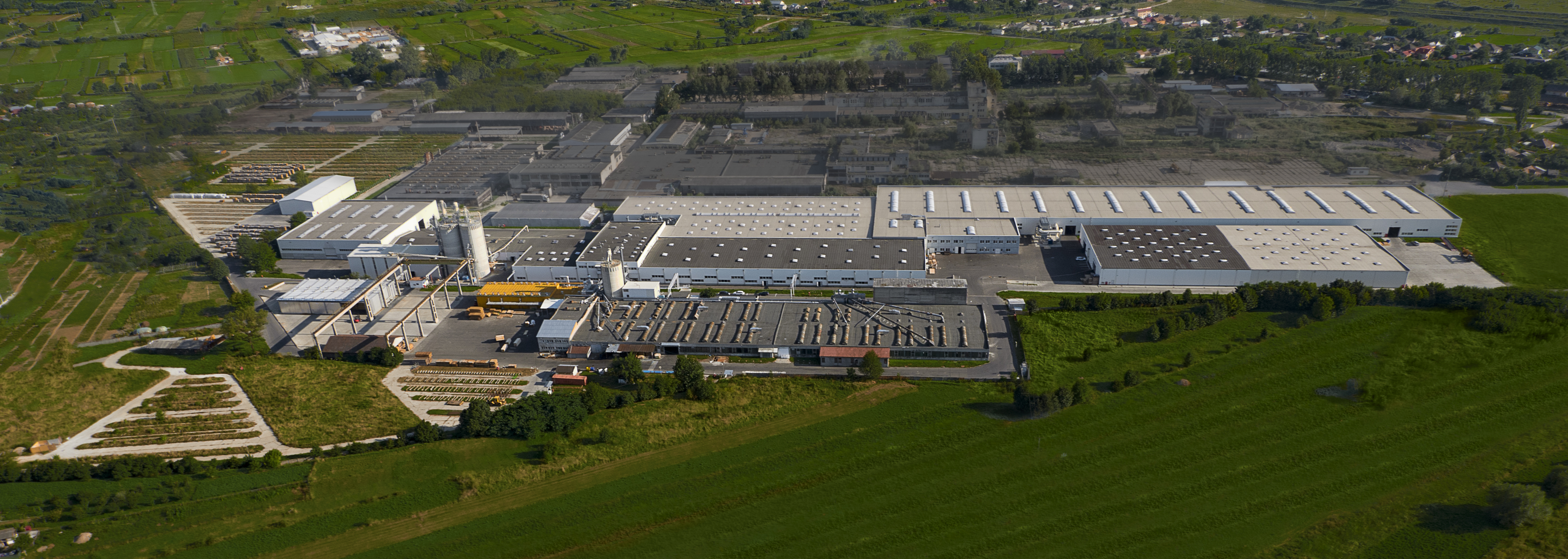
Blockboard factory in Comănești, Romania.

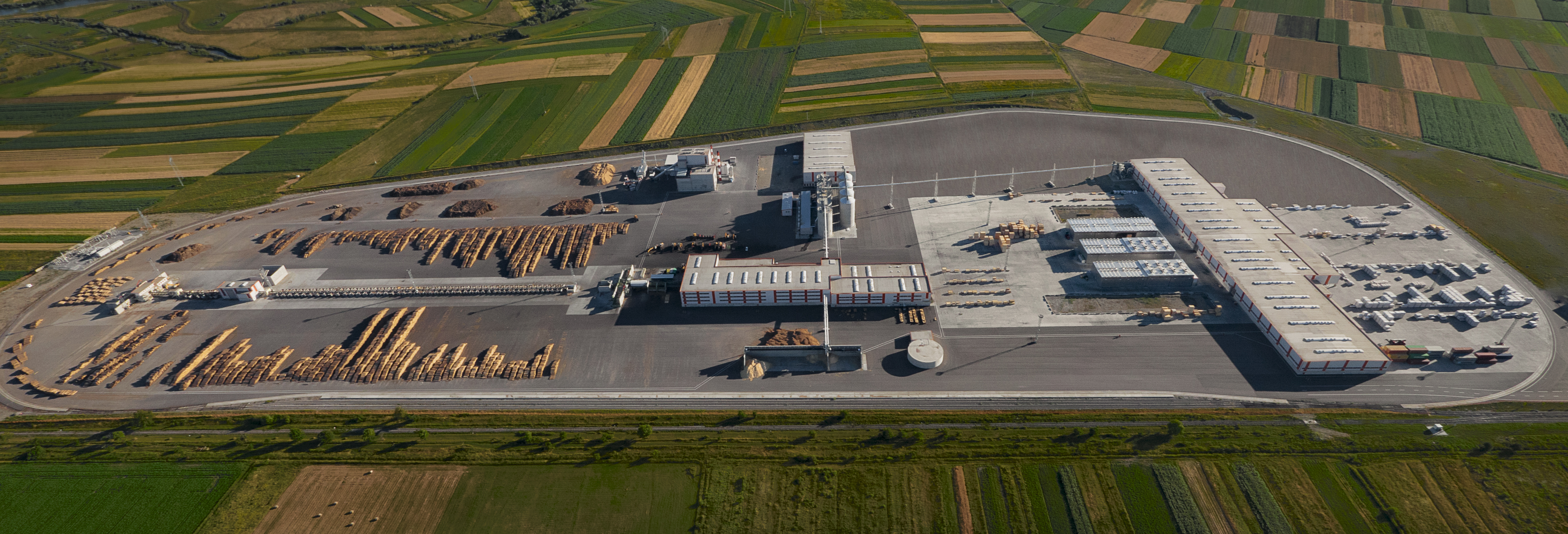
Aerial view of the sawmill in Reci, Romania.

The sawmill in Sebeș (700 employees) was the groups first factory in Romania and started operations in 2003. It was sold to Ziegler Group in August 2023.

== History ==
=== 17th to 20th century ===
HS Timber Group started as a family business. The earliest known reference to the family Schweighofer's involvement in woodworking dates back to 1642, as documented in official records. The development of the family business commenced in 1956 when Franz and Maria Schweighofer acquired a sawmill in Brand, Lower Austria, with an annual capacity of 1,000 cubic meters.

Gerald Schweighofer joined the company in 1975 and in 1977 he opened the worldwide unique profiling line for small diameter logs at the headquarters in Brand/Austria. This marked the beginning of a series of expansions and acquisitions, which included the opening of what was, in 1984, Europe's largest sawmill located in Ybbs an der Donau, Austria.

Further expansion occurred in 1991 with the acquisition and enlargement of a sawmill in Sollenau, Austria. This was followed by the takeover of the largest and most modern sawmill in Zdirec, Czech Republic, in 1996. By 1997, after acquiring sawmills in Bad St. Leonhard, Austria, and Plana, Czech Republic, the company's total capacity increased to 3 million cubic meters across six mills.

In addition, the Group entered into a joint venture with the Japanese company Maiken to establish the glue laminated timber mill Lamco, and founded the Schweighofer Privatstiftung (today: Evergreen Privatstiftung).

In 1998 Holzindustrie Schweighofer merged with Enso Timber and became the third largest saw milling company in the world. The Schweighofer family sold its shares, along with all sawmills in Austria and the Czech Republic to Stora Enso Timber in 2001.

=== 21st century ===
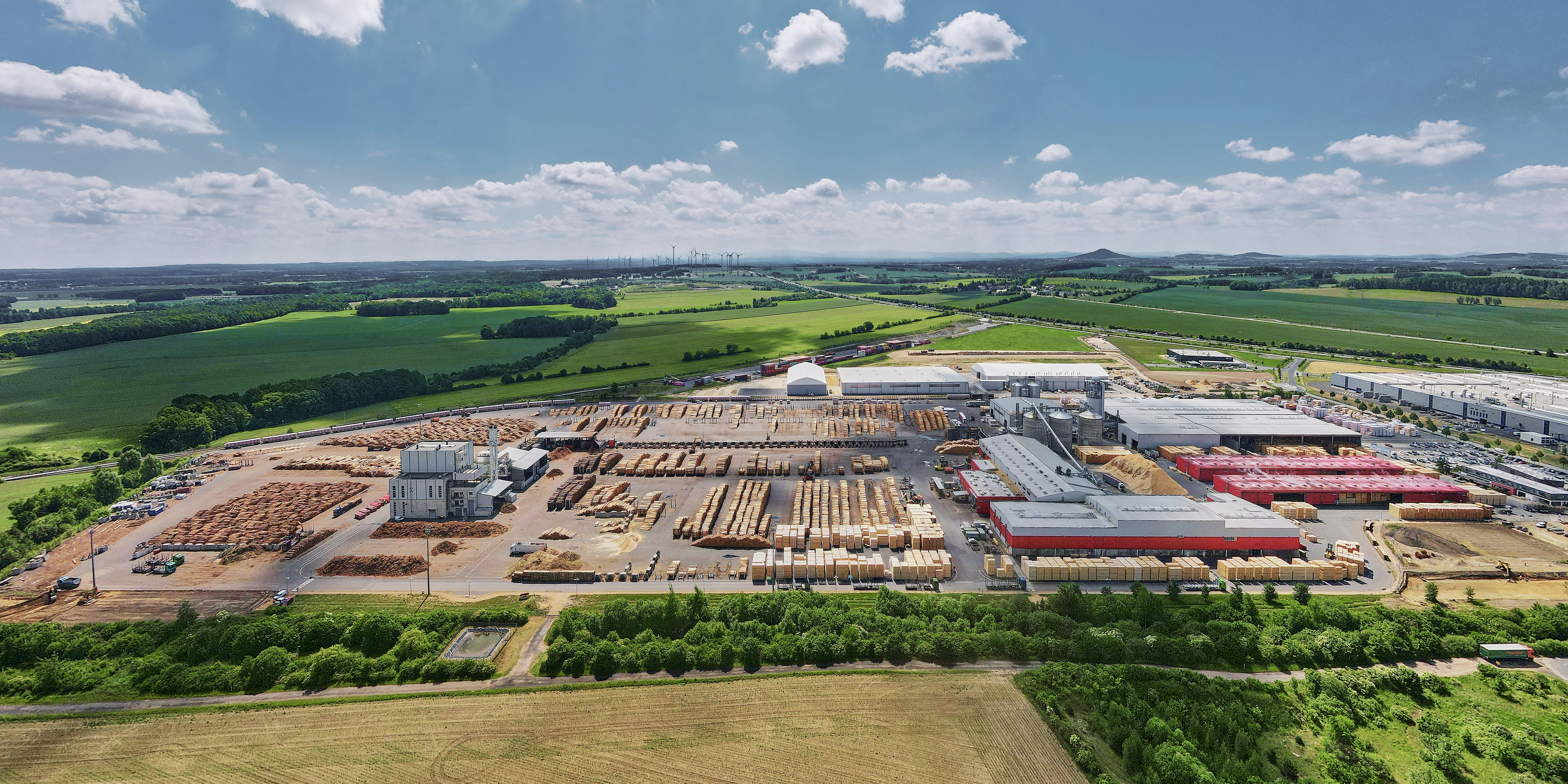
Aerial view of the sawmill in Kodersdorf, Germany.

In 2003 the group started production at a new and modern sawmill in Sebeș. This was followed by the commencement of a second sawmill in Rădăuți in 2008. In 2009 the group acquired the Swedwood manufacturing facility in Siret, located near their second mill. This facility, after modernization and expansion, began producing solid wood panels. In 2010, Holzindustrie Schweighofer BACO started producing blockboards and concrete formwork panels at the former Finnforest factory in Comăneşti.

In 2011, the group bought the M-real Hallein GmbH in Austria, which the Group sold again in September 2017 to TowerBrook Capital Partners. Schweighofer explained this move with increasing its focus on its core business of sawmilling.

In 2015 the group bought another sawmill in Kodersdorf in Germany from the Klausner Group.

In the same year the company faced allegations when evidence suggested that some of its suppliers were involved in the widespread destruction of virgin forests, with claims that the group was aware of the illegal sourcing of wood.

Responding to the allegations, in 2017, the company launched an action plan to promote a sustainable timber industry and transparent supply chains in Romania, with measures such as the implementation of the GPS tracking system "Timflow."

In 2019 Holzindustrie Schweighofer underwent a rebranding process and changed its name to HS Timber Group.

In December 2021 HS Timber Group broke ground for the construction of a new sawmill in Gobernador Virasoro in Argentina. The project “Acon Timber” is a joint venture with the Belgian company Forestcape.

By January 2022, the company faced operational challenges in Romania leading to the partial closure of two Romanian plants. On 30 March 2022, the sawmill in Radauti and the glue-laminated timber board plant in Siret ceased operations.

At the same time HS Timber acquired a Finnish sawmill in Luvia. In August 2023, HS Timber Group announced the sale of its Sebeş sawmill, its first venture in Romania, to the Ziegler Group.

== Science funding and innovation ==
In 2023 a new Christian-Doppler Laboratory was opened at the Technical University of Vienna, where HS Timber Group acts as the commercial partner. The laboratory’ research focuses on the development of wood-based bio-composites, known as WoodComp3D. These materials are derived from by-products commonly produced in sawmills, including wood chips, sawdust. The laboratory's research aims to enhance the sustainability of these by-products by transforming what is typically considered waste into valuable composite materials.

== Social Commitment ==
HS Timber Group and the foundation it is owned by (Evergreen Privatstiftung) support existing charitable projects in many countries. In Romania, the Romanian subsidiaries of the HS Timber Group focus mainly on projects in the immediate vicinity of their local plants. These projects include the financing and support of orphanages, hospitals, mobile elderly care, children's playgrounds, and disaster relief.

At the end of September 2017, the group launched the tree planting initiative "Tomorrow's Forest - Pădurea de mâine" in Romania and supports the campaign with over 1 million euros as well as logistical infrastructure. "Tomorrow's Forest" is a strategic partnership of the HS Timber Group, the Romanian private forest managers association - "Association of Forest Administrators" (AFA-AAP), and the Stefan cel Mare University of Suceava. The goal of planting 1 million trees was achieved in 2022, primarily on degraded forest land. In 2019, an independent non-profit foundation was established to continue this initiative with the support of HS Timber Group.

== Schweighofer Prize ==
Between 2003 and 2017, the Schweighofer Prize was awarded every two years as a European Innovation Award for forestry, wood technology, and wood products. The main prize honors a laureate for their lifetime achievement - for exceptional contributions that have a demonstrably positive impact on the European forestry and wood industry. Additionally, there were innovation awards for ideas, technologies, products, and services along the entire value chain. In 2011, a total of 300,000 euros in prize money was awarded. The Schweighofer Prize was endowed with a total of 300,000 euros every two years.

- Winners 2017: Hermann Blumer (Switzerland) & Shigeru Ban (Japan)
- Winner 2015: Erich Wiesner, CEO of the Wiehag Group
- Winner 2013: Federico Giudiceandrea, Microtec company from Brixen, Italy
- Winner 2011: Dieter Siempelcamp, Siempelcamp GmbH & Co. KG from Krefeld, Germany
- Winner 2009: Gerd Wegener, Professor of Wood Technology at the Technical University of Munich, Germany
- Winner 2007: Matti Kairi, Professor at the Technical University of Helsinki, Finland
- Winner 2005: Julius K. Natterer, Director of the Institute for Wood Constructions (IBOIS) at the ETH Lausanne, Switzerland
- Winner 2003: Hans Hundegger for the development of computer-controlled joinery machines, Otto Martin company from Allgäu, Germany

On the occasion of the 8th awarding of the Schweighofer Prize, a reorientation of the prize was decided. The Schweighofer Prize will no longer exist in its previous form, meaning the call for entries and the public award ceremony will be discontinued. The reorientation was due to the great success of the Student Awards introduced in 2017. The substantive goal remains the promotion of the forestry and wood industry sector.

In 2019, the follow-up project – the Evergreen Innovationcamp – took place for the first time as a 48-hour hackathon. In addition to innovation, this format also focuses on the networking of forestry and wood industry students with other disciplines.

== Controversy ==
On May 22, 2014, a public letter from Ukrainian ecological organization Kyiv Ecology and Culture Center appeared indicating that construction of wood processing factory in Ivano-Frankivsk region of Ukraine would require 500 000 tons of gravel to be excavated from local river beds, thus threatening Carpathian ecology. Ecologists have never received any response from company officials. The Environmental Investigation Agency (EIA) in 2015, releases their investigation of illegal logging in Romania. The report implicates Schweighofer as a major promoter and recipient of the destruction of Carpathian old growth forests. A comprehensive documentary released by Organized Crime and Corruption Reporting Project and RISE Project follows the illegal harvested wood in Romania.

On Feb 17, 2017, Forest Stewardship Council has disassociated itself from the company because of the company involvement in the purchasing and trading of illegally harvested timber in Romania and that this is having a negative impact on the country's natural protected areas. In the summer of 2017, FSC launched a stakeholder process in Romania, which sets out the conditions under which Holzindustrie Schweighofer may return to FSC.

In response to criticism, the company has presented an action plan for a sustainable timber industry in Romania. Its core measure is the self-developed GPS tracking system "Timflow". HS Timber Group records the route of all trucks that deliver saw logs to its sawmills. This data, together with photos of the loaded trucks, is publicly available at timflow.com. HS Timber Group wants to prove with this data that it does not receive wood of illegal origin and also adheres to its voluntary commitment not to accept wood from national parks.

An investigation in 2018 by Environmental Investigation Agency found that the company was continuing to buy wood from third party suppliers which comes from Romania's national parks. Holzindustrie Schweighofer publicly, strongly rejected these allegations. Moreover, the company has made a voluntary commitment not to process any wood originating from national parks. This commitment also includes areas of national parks (“buffer zones”) where harvesting is explicitly permitted by law.

In November 2021, the FSC announced the end of the disassociation and confirmed that HS Timber Group had met all requirements. The blockboard plant in Comanesti, Romania, was recertified again by FSC in January 2022.

In recent discussions, HS Timber Group has been listed as best practice in supply chain security and timber traceability.
