= Portfolium =

Portfolium, Inc.
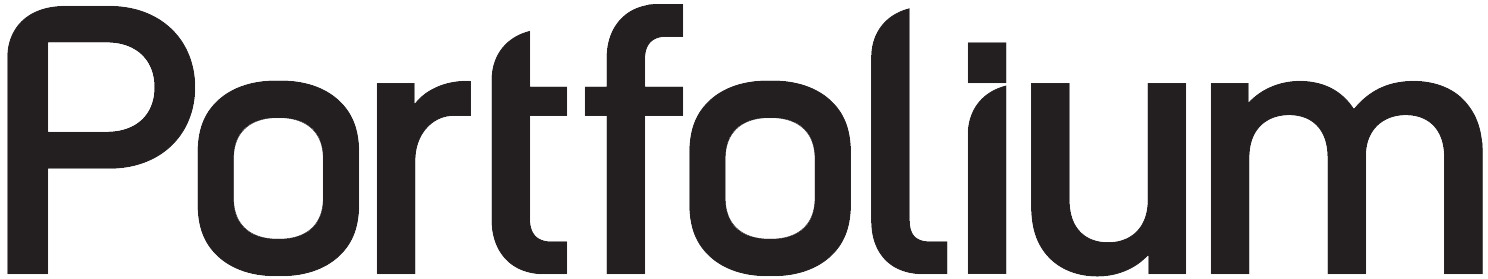
- Type: Private
- Industry: Social network service
- Founded: San Diego (2014)
- Founders: Adam Markowitz; Royce Rowan; Daniel Marashlian
- Headquarters: 750 B Street, Suite 3250, San Diego, United States
- Area served: United States; Mexico; Canada
- Key people: Adam Markowitz (CEO)
- Website: portfolium.com

Portfolium, Inc. is an American social networking platform company that allows university students and recent graduates to connect with businesses and employers and present their previous academic work and projects to supplement their resumes. The company was founded in 2014 and acquired by Instructure in 2019.

== History ==
Portfolium was founded in 2014 in San Diego by Adam Markowitz. Markowitz was unable to stand out and get hired by employers after numerous interviews, leading him to create a portfolio with the projects and activities he participated in while at UC San Diego, ultimately landing him a job working on NASA's space shuttle program. He then went on to create a prototype social networking platform, in which users would have the ability to create media-rich resumes with their academic projects and activities.

The company was accepted into Evonexus' accelerator 4-month Evostart program in San Diego. The company raised $900,000 in a seed funding round in the summer of 2014, exceeding by more than three times their initial goal of $250,000. Investors included Tech Coast Angels, Taner Halicioglu of Keshif Ventures among others. Portfolium was among the 15 winners of a $10,000 prize from the San Diego Regional Economic Development Corporation, in order to enhance the company's potential global expansion.

=== Partnerships ===
Portfolium first reached the alumni association of Markowitz's alma mater, UC San Diego, where he received a positive feedback. The company then secured a partnership agreement with California State University San Marcos, allowing the registration of the university's student and alumni population to Portfolium. The company also signed a contract with the University of California school system to power accounts for students and alumni across all 9 undergraduate campuses. Another partnership was secured with California Polytechnic State University in San Luis Obispo, CA. Under that deal, university students were populated into their own exclusive network within Portfolium, with access to further features, such as intergroup communication and the ability to link work within the group. Prior to signing with Portfolium, some Cal Poly students tested other ePortfolio solutions in a benchmark study where Portfolium was ultimately chosen as the unanimous winner.

== Website description ==
Portfolium's online platform is an academic-oriented social networking service, mainly targeting university students and recent graduates. Users can showcase their work by uploading media files such as images, PDFs, videos and other media files onto their profiles. Portfolium has attracted graduates from a wide variety of majors, but engineers and other STEM students understand and utilize the features of the platform the quickest. This was attributed to the fact that its founder was an engineer himself and, when originally designed and marketed, it was done so having the needs of engineers in mind. A mobile iOS application was made available on Portfolium, with which users could apply for jobs by putting their academic work in front of hiring managers by hashtaging the desired employer's name. Apart from the United States, Portfolium's platform is available to students from Spain, Mexico and Argentina as of August 2015. Employers who have utilized Portfolium in the hiring of students and recent graduates include SpaceX, Qualcomm, and Boeing.
