= TCA Venture Group =

American venture capital firm

Tech Coast Angels, Inc. (dba TCA Venture Group)
- Formerly: Tech Coast Angels
- Type: Mutual-benefit nonprofit corporation
- Industry: Private equity
- Founded: 1997; 29 years ago
- Headquarters: Southern California, United States
- Products: Angel investor, venture capital
- Website: tcaventuregroup.com

TCA Venture Group is an American provider of venture capital to early-stage companies in Southern California. In 2023, TCA had about 400 members. In August 2014, an analysis by CB Insights ranked TCA No.1 out of 370 angel groups on “Network Centrality” and No. 5 overall in “Investor Mosaic.”

== History ==
Tech Coast Angels - now (as at March 2024) called TCA Venture Group - was founded in 1997 by Luis Villalobos.

TCA members provide companies capital, counsel, mentoring and access to a network of potential investors and partners. TCA has chapters located in Los Angeles, Orange County, and the Inland Empire. In addition, Pasadena Angels and MEDA Angels are networks within TCA Venture Group.

In 2020, TCA invested $20 million in 64 companies.

Furthermore, TCA had invested about $15.4 million in a total of 41 companies in 2022, as noted in its 2022 Annual Report and total investments have exceeded $10 million for twelve years. While there were also 10 shutdowns, 21 of them of the 41 companies receiving funding were new additions to TCA's portfolio, representing 72% of investments, compared to 48% in 2021.

In January 2024, Tech Coast Angels renamed itself TCA Venture Group, to reflect that its investments are much broader than just technology and that over 50% of its recent investments have been outside Southern California.

=== Company exits ===
TCA has had eleven IPOs and over 106 exits in total. Four of those (Procore, Mindbody, Greendot and Sandpiper Networks) achieved multiples between 149x and 368x. TCA's successful exits include:

- Procore Technologies (construction management SAAS)
- Mindbody (wellness business services software)
- Green Dot Corporation (over-the-counter prepaid debit card)
- Sandpiper Networks (internet infrastructure)
- Truecar (automotive lead generation)
- Companion Medical (smart insulin pen system paired with diabetes management app)
- FinDox (compliance tool for institutional investors)
- Leaselock (sells Certificates of Guarantee promising rent when tenant defaults)
- BlueBeam Software (PDF collaboration software)
- One Stop Systems (manufactures Computers for Industrial Applications)
- Parcel Pending (electronic Smart Locker storage system for multi-family housing)
- Annex Cloud (SaaS based social platform for online retailers to monetize social media)
- Kalyra Pharmaceuticals (oil substitute, made from waste beef tallow)
- Green Earth Technologies (oil substitute made from waste beef tallow)
- Casestack (integrated logistics outsourcing)
- EV Connect Inc (electric car battery charging solution)
- Lytx (Drivecam (video event recorder for driver feedback safety)
- Cytom X Therapeutics (antibody therapeutics for a variety of serious diseases including cancer)
- Beam Global (portable solar EV charging station with no grid ties)
- WiseWindow (open qualitative content aggregation platform)
- Vital Therapies (liver assist device)
- Language Weaver (machine translation software)
- Doctible (cash-based healthcare network to shop for healthcare)
- WeGoLook (dispatches in-person Lookers to verify claims made by internet sellers)
- Portfolium (online social portfolio network)
- AIRSIS (remote asset tracking & management)
- Retrosense Therapeutics (biologic approach to vision restoration in retinal degenerative conditions)
- Althea (cGMP manufacturing, analytical development, aseptic filling)
- N Spine (spine stability system)
- OptionEase (stock option audit financial software)
- VCP (Platform for debit card, credit card and wellness programs for veterinarians and dentists)
- Discover Echo (world's first hybrid hi-res digital microscope)
- Insight Medical (computer assisted surgery in orthopedic procedures)
- LendAmend LLC (online solution for loan amendment)
- Greenplum (intelligent data routing systems)
- Savara Pharmaceuticals (inhalable antibiotic for the treatment of MRSA in Cystic Fibrosis patients)
- ClearCare (management of home care agencies)
- Cognition Therapeutics Inc (memory restoration for Alzheimer's)
- Pictage.com (online event photography services)
- eTeamz (B2C Amateur Athletic Community)
- Trius Therapeutics (antimicrobial drug)
- Olive Medical (HD surgical camera)
- Controltec, Inc. (ASP for Subsidized Child Care)
- Molecular Medicine BioServices (contract clinical manufacturer)
- Allylix (artificial fragrance production)

In addition to the 106 exits, 141 companies in the portfolio were shutdowns with no returns. Based on all outcomes to date, TCA's portfolio has returned 6.4 times invested capital, and achieved an IRR of 25% on its portfolio.

== Investment portfolio ==
The TCA investment portfolio page lists investments in general categories such as Life Sciences, Internet and Apps, Software, Consumer, CleanTech and Industrials, Hardware, Financial, and Business. Active portfolio companies include:

- Apeel Sciences (tasteless edible coatings for fresh produce)
- The Bouqs Company (Online Flower Shopping)
- Cloudbeds (SAAS Hotel Hospitality Management Software)
- ElephantDrive (storage-as-a-service software)
- Kickstart (Cadence Biomedical) (helps people with severe disabilities walk)
- myLAB Box (testing for STDs from the comfort of home)
- Ninja Metrics (measures social influence)
- PharmaSecure (mass serialization codes for products in emerging markets)
- Ranker (UGC – social platform for ranking things)
- YouMail (voice messaging for cell phones)
