= Klausner =

Klausner is a surname, and may refer to:

- Abraham Klausner (Austrian rabbi), 14th-century rabbi
- Joseph Klausner (1874–1958), Jewish scholar
- Ida Klausner, maiden name of Ida Roland (1881–1951), Austrian and German actress
- Hubert Klausner (1892–1939), Austrian politician
- Margot Klausner (1905–1975), German-Israeli writer and filmmaker
- Abraham Klausner (1915–2007), Jewish United States Army captain and chaplain
- Amos Klausner, birth name of Amos Oz (1939–2018), Israeli writer and novelist.
- R. Gary Klausner (born 1941), American federal judge.
- Richard Klausner (born 1950s), American scientist
- Harriet Klausner (1952–2015), American book reviewer
- Michael Klausner (born 1954), American scholar.
- Laura Janner-Klausner (born 1963), British rabbi
- Julie Klausner (born 1978), American comedian
- Josh Klausner, American screenwriter
- Howard Klausner, American filmmaker and writer
- Judah Klausner, American composer and inventor
