= NeoEdge Networks =

- Type: Private
- Industry: In-game advertising/Digital distribution
- Founded: 2002
- Headquarters: Mountain View, California
- Key people: Dan Servos, CEO; Todd Kenck, CFO; Andrew Radin, CTO; Nolan Bushnell, Chairman of the Board; Steven Woods, Co-founder, Member of the Board; Michael Babiak, Co-founder, Sr. VP Advertising
- Products: Video commercials in casual games

NeoEdge Networks was a Silicon Valley–based technology and in-game advertising company that enabled casual game publishers and developers to deliver television-like commercials within their products – frequently in the context of free-to-consumer casual game play. NeoEdge powered advertising for a variety of game publishers including Yahoo. NeoEdge provided both peer-to-peer game distribution (to reduce costs of distributing games) and in-game advertising (to help increase consumer game play and monetization). It was renamed Blue Noodle in early 2011 and shut down later that year.

== Introduction ==
NeoEdge provided advertising inside online casual games. The online video advertising platform provides advertisers a medium that reaches a key demographic (adults over 18 years of age) with television-like commercials in an engaged environment that casual gamers have accepted in exchange for free game play.

== History ==
NeoEdge was founded in 2002 by Steven Woods, Jeromy Carriere, Kelly Slough, Dave Simons, and Michael Babiak, former Netscape and America Online employees, under the name "Kinitos". While at Quack.com the founders created the first consumer-based Voice Portal, acquired by America Online in 2000. In 2007, Atari co-founder Nolan Bushnell joined the NeoEdge board as Chairman.

Under the Kinitos brand, the company participated in Microsoft Smart Client program intended to help companies deliver Web 2.0 Internet services. These services were intended to help companies deliver consumer services that transcended traditional browsers – helping to provide downloadable application-style capabilities to consumer and enterprise companies without the past problems associated with installed applications. Downloadable games with embedded web services are one class of such solutions, the MostFun.com Game Player, owned by NeoEdge, is one example of such an application - others include all manner of browser extensions and plugins, or downloadable web services applications like instant messaging, Google Earth, Bittorrent, iTunes, and many others.

In 2005, Kinitos reorganized to support game developers and distributors to deliver ad-enabled game play to consumers as an alternative to traditional "try and buy" models. NeoEdge became a leader in changing the current business model of the casual game industry. According to the Casual Game Association, 200 Million people worldwide play casual games every month. The industry struggled as a “hits” based business with a “Try and Buy” business model made long-term revenue generation difficult.

In 2010, the company was merged with Offspring Games and started a game studio in San Francisco, California. Titles released include Prize-O-Rama and Happy Thoughts. The game studio was unable to produce a profitable title and the company fell on hard financial times during the Great Recession. It was shut down in July 2011.
