= Quack.com =

- Type: Private
- Industry: Telephone
- Founded: 1998, Pittsburgh, PA
- Headquarters: Mountain View, CA
- Key people: Alex Quilici, Chief Executive Officer, Steven Woods, Chief Technology Officer, Michael Babiak, VP Corporate Development, Dan Servos, SVP Bus Dev
- Products: Telephone services and applications

Quack.com was an early voice portal company. The domain name later was used for Quack, an iPad search application from AOL.

== History ==
It was founded in 1998 by Steven Woods, Jeromy Carriere and Alex Quilici as a Pittsburgh, Pennsylvania, USA, based voice portal infrastructure company named Quackware. Quack was the first company to try to create a voice portal: a consumer-based destination "site" in which consumers could not only access information by voice alone, but also complete transactions. Quackware launched a beta phone service in 1999 that allowed consumers to purchase books from sites such as Amazon and CDs from sites such as CDNow by answering a short set of questions. Quack followed with a set of information services from movie listings (inspired by, but expanding upon, Moviefone) to news, weather and stock quotes. This concept introduced a series of lookalike startups including Tellme Networks which raised more money than any Internet startup in history on a similar concept.

Quack received its first venture funding from HDL Capital in 1999 and moved operations to Mountain View in Silicon Valley, California in 1999. A deal with Lycos was announced in May 2000. In September 2000 Quack was acquired for $200 million by America Online (AOL) and moved onto the Netscape campus with what was left of the Netscape team.

Quack was attacked in the Canadian press for being representative of the Canadian "brain drain" to the US during the Internet bubble, focusing its recruiting efforts on the University of Waterloo, hiring more than 50 engineers from Waterloo in less than 10 months. Quack competitor Tellme Networks raised enormous funds in what became a highly competitive market in 2000, with the emergence of more than a dozen additional competitors in a 12-month period.

Following its acquisition by America Online in an effort led by Ted Leonsis to bring Quack into AOL Interactive, the Quack voice service became AOLbyPhone as one of AOL's "web properties" along with MapQuest, Moviefone and others.

Quack secured several patents that underlie the technical challenges of delivering interactive voice services. Constructing a voice portal required integrations and innovations not only in speech recognition and speech generation, but also in databases, application specification, constraint-based reasoning and artificial intelligence and computational linguistics. "Quack"'s name derived from the company goal of providing not only voice-based services, but more broadly "Quick Ubiquitous Access to Consumer Knowledge".

The patents assigned to Quack.com include: System and method for voice access to Internet-based information, System and method for advertising with an Internet Voice Portal and recognizing the axiom that in interactive voice systems one must "know the set of possible answers to a question before asking it". System and method for determining if one web site has the same information as another web site.

Quack.com was spoofed in The Simpsons in March 2002 in the episode "Blame It on Lisa" in which a "ComQuaak" sign is replaced by another equally crazy telecom company name.

== 2010 onwards ==
In July 2010, quack.com became the focus of a new AOL iPad application, that was a web search experience. The product delivers web results and blends in picture, video and Twitter results. It enables you to preview the web results before you go to the site, search within each result, and flip through the results pages, making full use of the iPad's touch screen features. The iPad app was free via iTunes, but support discontinued in 2012.

== See also ==
- List of speech recognition software
