= Giovanni Battista Quilici =

Venerable Giovanni Battista Quilici
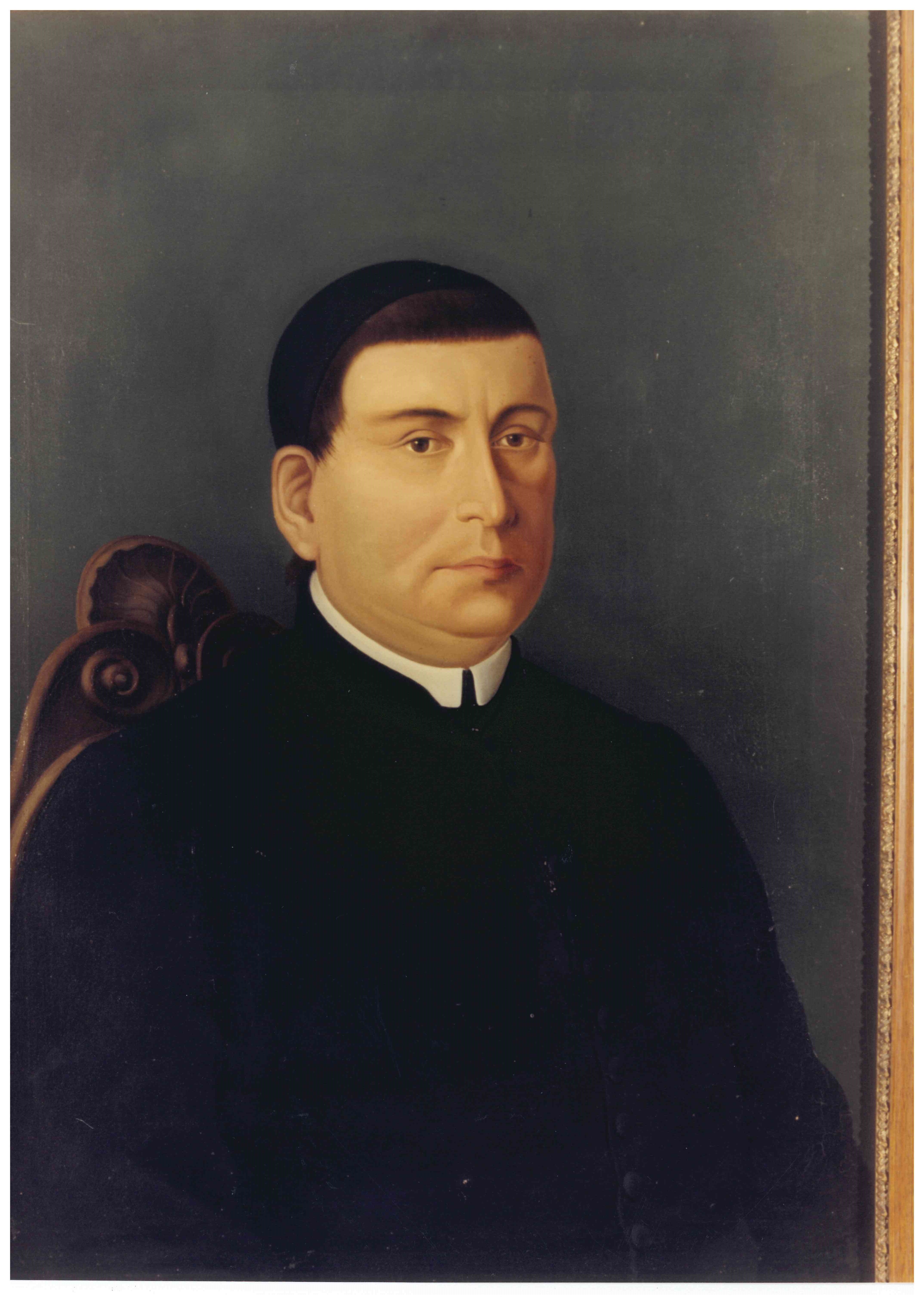
- Painting, c. 1872
- Born: 26 April 1791; Livorno, Grand Duchy of Tuscany
- Died: 10 June 1844 (aged 53); Livorno, Grand Duchy of Tuscany

Giovanni Battista Quilici (26 April 1791 – 10 June 1844) was an Italian Roman Catholic priest. He founded the Daughters of the Crucified as well as several other religious institutions. The priest originated from Livorno where he served as a parish priest for several decades in addition to his role as a caregiver for prostitutes and ill people – he distinguished himself during an 1835 cholera epidemic that claimed his sister. He had the esteem of other noted individuals including Grand Duke Leopoldo II and Juliette Colbert.

The beatification process commenced under Pope John Paul II in 1994 after he was titled as a Servant of God and the process culminated on 3 March 2016 after Pope Francis confirmed his life of heroic virtue and titled him as venerable.

== Life ==
Giovanni Battista Quilici was born in Livorno on 26 April 1791 to Bernardo Quilici and Chiara Sgallini; he was baptized on 27 April at the San Francesco Cattedrale and he later received his Confirmation in 1798.

The Barnabites from the church of San Sebastiano and the Dominicans from the church of Santa Caterina oversaw his education in his childhood and adolescence. In 1811 he and his close friend Pietro Paolo Stefanini decided to become postulants at the Dominican convent, but the subsequent suppression of the Dominicans – due to Napoleon Bonaparte's invasion of the Italian peninsula – interrupted their plans to join. His father died in 1811. Quilici was ordained as a priest on 13 April 1816, Holy Saturday. Quilici served as an assistant pastor at San Sebastiano for two decades. In his ecclesiastical career he decided to dedicate himself to the social and moral outcasts of Livorno and this included people such as prisoners and prostitutes.

He founded the Evangelical Workers and the Fathers of Families in 1820 as a means to instruct the faithful in catechism while also tending to the sick and instructing children in religious education.

From 1828 until 1835 he started to build up and lead the Istituto della Carità di Santa Maria Maddalena which he established on 18 August 1828. This institute materialized after several meetings with Grand Duke Leopoldo II and Juliette Colbert – future Venerable. In 1829 he began the construction of the church of Santi Pietro e Paolo and construction was completed in 1835; in 1837 he became its first rector and parish priest. In 1837 – a few months after – he refused to become a canon penitentiary of the Livorno Cathedral to devote himself to his new parish church. He distinguished himself during an 1835 cholera epidemic that claimed the life of his sister and his new church was used as a kind of field hospital for those suffering from the disease; he himself contracted the disease but was treated for it. The duke awarded him a gold medal for his services during the epidemic.

He founded a religious congregation, the Daughters of the Crucified, on 12 September 1840. He referred to the women of the congregation as his "little girls". Quilici's decision to establish a religious congregation prompted Colbert to found one of her own in Turin.

In 1843 one of his relatives attacked him to take possession of his funds intended for the poor. In 1844 Leopold II offered him the Cross of Saint Joseph but Quilici refused because he deemed it unimportant; the duke wanted to change it to an economic contribution but the priest had died before he could receive it.

Quilici died on 10 June 1844, on the Feast of Corpus Christi, after he fell ill with a high fever at the beginning of the month. His funeral was celebrated on 11 June 1844 and his remains were later transferred in 1932. The congregation received the papal decree of praise from Pope Pius IX on 15 January 1853 and later received full approval from Pope Leo XIII in 1882. It was later aggregated to the Order of Saint Augustine on 11 October 1898.

== Beatification process ==
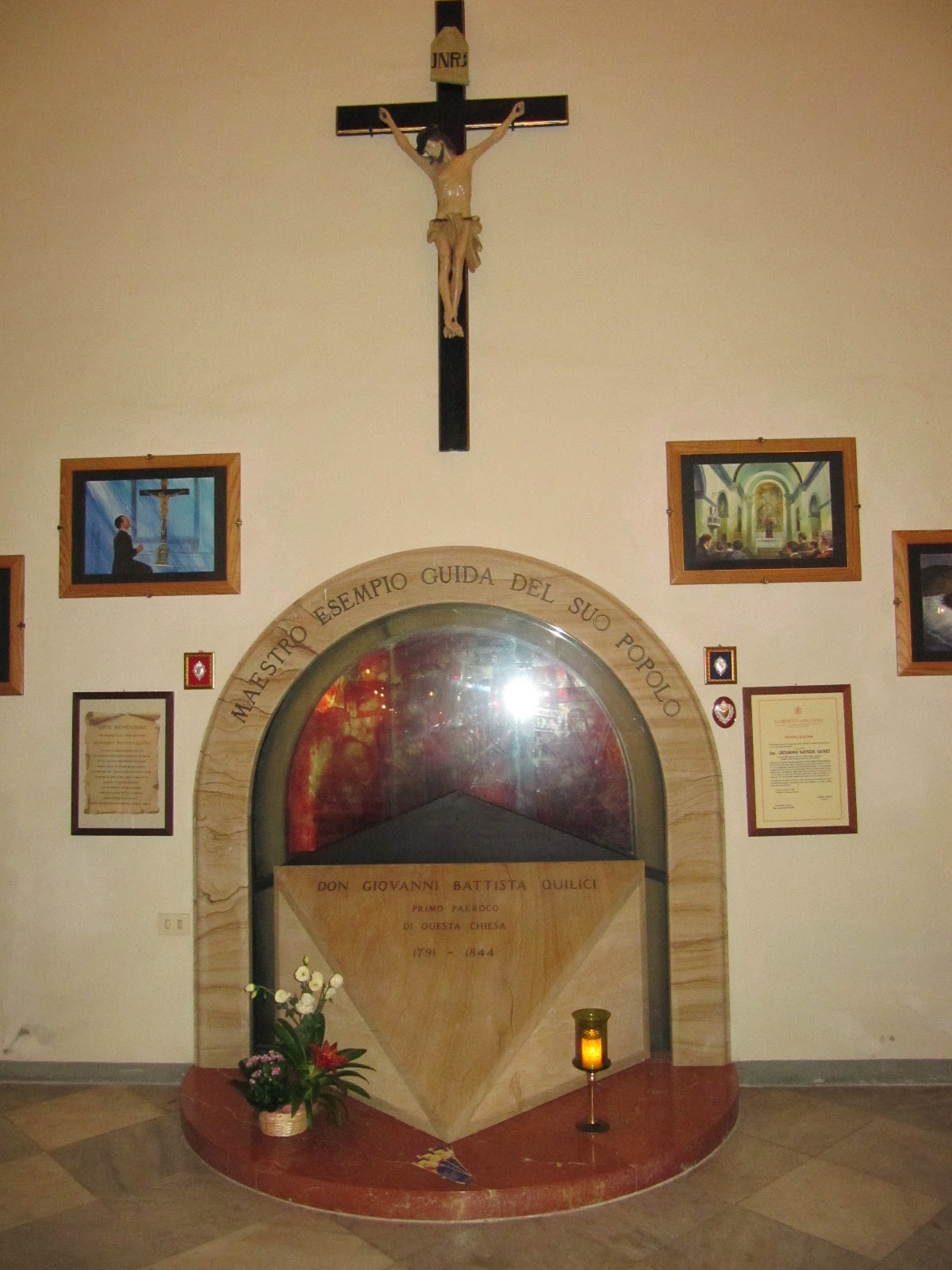
Tomb in Livorno

In mid-1985 a gathering of priests for a conference in Livorno requested Bishop Alberto Ablondi to consider the potential for a canonization cause for the Quilici and on 27 April 1992 a formal request was made to Ablondi that a process soon be initiated. The cause commenced in Livorno under Pope John Paul II on 21 January 1994 after the Congregation for the Causes of Saints issued the nihil obstat ("nothing against") to the cause and titled Quilici as a Servant of God. Ablondi inaugurated the diocesan process on 17 June 1994 and oversaw its successful conclusion on 20 June 1998. The Congregation issued validation to this process in Rome on 12 November 1999 and received the positio from the postulation in 2013.

The historians met to assess the cause and issued their approval to it in a session held on 10 December 2013 while theologians followed this decision on 20 October 2015. The cardinal and bishop members likewise came to the same conclusion on 1 March 2016. On 3 March 2016 he was proclaimed to be Venerable after Pope Francis confirmed that the late Quilici had lived a model Christian life of heroic virtue.
