= Youmail =

Mobile network extension company in California, United States

YouMail Inc
- Type: Private
- Industry: Wireless Services
- Founded: 2007
- Headquarters: Dallas, TX
- Key people: Alex Quilici, Chief Executive Officer; Mike Rudolph, Chief Technical Officer
- Products: Visual Voicemail, Call Management, Robocall blocking software
- Website: YouMail.com

YouMail is a Dallas, Texas headquartered, remote-first developer of a visual voicemail and Robocall blocking service for mobile phones, available in the US and the UK. Their voicemail mobile app replaces the voicemail service offered by mobile phone service providers, and offers webmail-like voicemail access and voicemail-to-text transcriptions. The company also compiles the YouMail Robocall index by monitoring automated call patterns and behaviors, and verifying that activity against numbers that its customers block, or report as spam. The company also provides a suite of services for service providers to designed to help them detect and stop illegal robocalls originating or traversing through their networks, as well as services for enterprises to monitor the behavior of their phone numbers and protect their brands from telecom fraud.

== History ==
The YouMail brand visual voicemail software was first developed, trademarked, and brought to market in 2006 by communications software developer Zeacom, which is based in Auckland, New Zealand. The service originally started out as a multi-platform visual voicemail solution, with the novel feature of personal greetings, where users could create different greetings for callers based on their incoming caller ID. Helping combat robocalls their service replaces an ordinary voicemail; it instead plays three notes that create the impression of a non-working number to prevent robocalls from coming in.

YouMail was spun off as a standalone service in 2007. In November 2007, YouMail announced a partnership with Salient Media, to offer a combination of free and subscription-based comedic voicemail greetings.

In 2009, the company saw its first success, with visual voicemail for BlackBerry. It also launched a free iPhone app, which was considered a loss leader for its voicemail transcription services.

In 2010, the company announced that YouMail was the standard voicemail that comes with all mobile phones from IMMIX Wireless in Pennsylvania, Cellular One in eastern Central Illinois, Blue Wireless in New York, iSmart Mobile in Montana, VoicePulse in New Jersey, and Windy City Cellular in Adak, Alaska.

In 2011, the company launched WhoAreYou, an app for Android that provides users with caller's names, and gives them the ability to add specific numbers to a block list, screening out robocalls and telemarketers in the process.

By 2012, the company reported over 2.5 million registered users of its service. The company also announced they stopped supporting new updates for BlackBerry devices.

In November 2015, the company launched the YouMail Robocall Index, to track legal and illegal robocall traffic across the US. The YouMail Robocall Index is a unique online portal which provides a monthly estimate of the volumes and types of robocalls nationwide, and for each specific state, city and area code. The initial report indicated at that time that 1 out of every 6 calls received in the US was generated by a machine.

The ongoing monthly estimate is created by extrapolating from the behavior of the billions of calls that YouMail has managed for its users. YouMail identifies problematic numbers through its audio fingerprinting technology and analysis of calling patterns, along with direct consumer feedback. In turn, the Index's statistics have been regularly cited by the Federal Communications Commission (FCC), consumer advocates and many other groups as the national source for robocalling data trends.

YouMail won the American Business Awards' Gold Stevie Award for Technical Innovation of the Year, and the YouMail app was named the nation's best robocall-blocking solution in a competition organized by Geoffrey Fowler of The Washington Post.

== Products ==
YouMail services have been described in detail by an independent source, with review.

=== Voicemail apps ===
YouMail develops visual voicemail apps for Android phones and iPhones. The app features a voice-to-text feature which automatically transcribes voice messages and displays the text on-screen. This allows users to get their messages without having to listen to them.

The company also produces WhoAreYou for Android, which enhances their visual voicemail app by adding call and text blocking and real-time reverse lookups on incoming calls and SMS messages. The app can deter callers by picking up the call, playing a recorded "out of service" message to the caller, and hang back up, making the caller think the line has been disconnected.

The company's visual voicemail app is preloaded or recommended by carriers including Viaero Wireless and RedPocketMobile.

=== YouMail Robocall Index ===
The company also produces the YouMail Robocall Index, which announced in January 2016 that Americans received over one billion unsolicited or automated calls in December 2015. Atlanta was identified as the area hardest hit by robocalls, with Houston in second. US robocalls have reached new highs in the years since, leading to President Trump signing legislation on December 31, 2019 to help reduce the volume of unwanted robocalls. In March 2020, the index identified an expanding set of robocalls leveraging the COVID-19 pandemic. Identifying these illegal calls, YouMail notified carriers, enterprises, and the authorities to locate, take down, and punish the callers, helping shut down the COVID-19 scams in just days.

=== YouMail virtual numbers and receptionist ===
YouMail virtual numbers provide a second phone number, for example to separate business calls from personal calls, while keeping cell phones private and protected from unwanted calls.

=== API ===
Third-party developers use YouMail's API to create apps for other platforms, such as MagikMail for Windows Phone.
