= PharmaSecure =

- Type: Private
- Founded: 2007
- Headquarters: Santa Monica, California, United States
- Key people: Nakul Pasricha (CEO)
- Services: Serialization; product authentication; track‑and‑trace; consumer engagement
- Website: pharmasecure.com

PharmaSecure is a U.S.-based technology company specializing in serialization, product authentication, and mobile-based verification services. The company develops systems that allow consumers, regulators, and manufacturers to verify the authenticity of packaged goods and monitor supply-chain integrity.

According to the company’s official corporate contact information, PharmaSecure is headquartered in Santa Monica, California.

PharmaSecure also maintains operations in India, where it implements authentication and track-and-trace services for pharmaceutical and consumer-goods manufacturers.

== History ==
PharmaSecure was founded by Nathan Sigworth and N. Taylor Thompson in 2007. The company was started to address the problem of counterfeit pharmaceuticals. Two years later, in 2009, it began its operations in India.

In 2010, PharmaSecure obtained contracts covering approximately 70 million serialization codes for Indian pharmaceutical brands.

In 2011, India implemented new serialization requirements for pharmaceutical exports, and PharmaSecure was cited among companies offering compliance technologies supporting the mandate.

In 2013, the company was authorized by the National Agency for Food and Drug Administration and Control (NAFDAC) in Nigeria to provide Mobile Authentication Service (MAS).

The company joined global public health initiatives, e.g., joined Fight the Fakes Alliance in 2015 to combat counterfeit medicines.

In 2016, PharmaSecure joined a global coalition of over 1,300 partners working to improve tuberculosis treatment outcomes. Also in 2016, a U.S. patent for product authentication technology (US9432337B2) was granted to PharmaSecure.

In 2021, market reports recognized PharmaSecure as a globally significant provider of track‑and‑trace solutions, emphasizing its role in the pharmaceutical supply chain.

In 2023, GS1’s global Solution Partner directory reported that PharmaSecure had helped protect close to 4 billion packages worldwide through its serialization and track-and-trace solutions.

In 2024, PharmaSecure was mentioned as one of the top 31 healthtech innovators among the companies working in Africa.

In 2025 PharmaSecure was listed as a Bronze partner in the GS1 Nigeria Partner Finder. According to the directory, the company “has helped protect over 8 billion packages” through its serialization and track-and-trace solutions.

== Operations and services ==
PharmaSecure offers serialization, product authentication, consumer-engagement solutions, and mobile verification services for pharmaceutical and fast-moving consumer goods. According to GS1, PharmaSecure provides hardware and software-based track-and-trace and brand protection solutions and is listed as a GS1 Healthcare Solution Partner. Its coded products are distributed in over 50 countries.
