= Luis Villalobos (investor) =

Luis Villalobos (November 5, 1938 – October 1, 2009) was an engineer, entrepreneur and angel investor credited with founding the angel investing organization Tech Coast Angels in 1997

As an engineer and entrepreneur, Villalobos founded two companies (Including Conographic Corporation with Joseph Meshi) and as an angel investor, invested in over 50 ventures. In 2006 Luis was the recipient of the Hans Severiens Award for his accomplishments in the advancement of angel investing.

The Paul Merage School of Business at the University of California, Irvine has established an endowed fellowship fund (the Luis Villalobos Endowed Fellowship in Entrepreneurship) in honor of Luis Villalobos' contributions to entrepreneurship.

The Angel Capital Association have established an annual Luis Villalobos award

Villalobos was a graduate of MIT and the Harvard Business School.
