= Judah Klausner =

American composer and inventor

Judah Klausner is an American composer and inventor. He developed and patented the Personal digital assistant (PDA) and electronic organizer. Klausner won settlements from Apple, Skype and LG Electronics.
