= Voice portal =

Web portals where information is accessed via voice commands

Voice portals are the voice equivalent of web portals, giving access to information through spoken commands and voice responses. Ideally a voice portal could be an access point for any type of information, services, or transactions found on the Internet. Common uses include movie time listings and stock trading. In telecommunications circles, voice portals may be referred to as interactive voice response (IVR) systems, but this term also includes DTMF services. With the emergence of conversational assistants such as Apple's Siri, Amazon Alexa, Google Assistant, Microsoft Cortana, and Samsung's Bixby, Voice Portals can now be accessed through mobile devices and Far Field voice smart speakers such as the Amazon Echo and Google Home.

== Advantages ==
Voice portals have no dependency on the access device; even low end mobile handsets can access the service. Voice portals talk to users in their local language and there is reduced customer learning required for using voice services compared to Internet/SMS based services.

A complex search query that otherwise would take multiple widgets (drop down, check box, text box filling), can easily and effortlessly be formulated by anyone who can speak without needing to be familiar with any visual interfaces. For instance, one can say, "Find me an eyeliner, not too thick, dark brown, from Estee Lauder MAC, that's below thirty dollars" or "What is the closest liquor store from here and what time do they close?"

== Limitations ==
Voice is the most natural communication medium, but the information that can be provided is limited compared to visual media.

For example, most Internet users try a search term, scan results, then adjust the search term to eliminate irrelevant results. They may take two or three quick iterations to get a list that they are confident will contain what they are looking for. The equivalent approach is not practical when results are spoken, as it would take far too long. In this case, a multimodal interaction would be preferable to a voice-only interface.

== Trends ==
Live-agent and Internet-based voice portals are converging, and the range of information they can provide is expanding.

Live-agent portals are introducing greater automation through speech recognition and text-to-speech technology, in many cases providing fully automated service, while automated Internet-based portals are adding operator fallback in premium services. The live-agent portals, which used to rely entirely on pre-structured databases holding specific types of information are expanding into more free-form Internet access, while the Internet-based portals are adding pre-structured content to improve automation of the more common types of request.

Speech technology is starting to introduce Artificial Intelligence concepts that make it practical to recognise a much broader range of utterances, learning from experience. This approach may contribute to improved speaker recognition rates and a broader range of information provided by voice portals

== Technology providers ==
A number of web-based companies are dedicated to providing voice-based access to Internet information to consumers. Quack.com launched its service in March 2000 and has since obtained the first overall voiceportal patent. Quack.com was acquired by AOL in 2000 and relaunched as AOL By Phone later that year. Tellme Networks was acquired by Microsoft in 2007. Nuance, the dominant provider of speech recognition and text-to-speech technology, is starting to deliver voice portal solutions. Other companies in this space include TelSurf Networks, FonGenie, Apptera and Call Genie.

Apart from public voice portal services, a number of technology companies, including Alcatel-Lucent, Avaya, and Cisco, offer commercial enterprise-grade voice portal products to be used by companies to serve their clients. Avaya also has a carrier-grade portfolio.

== See also ==
- Call avoidance
- Mobile Search
- Mobile local search
