= 3M computer =

1980s specifications for a computer workstation

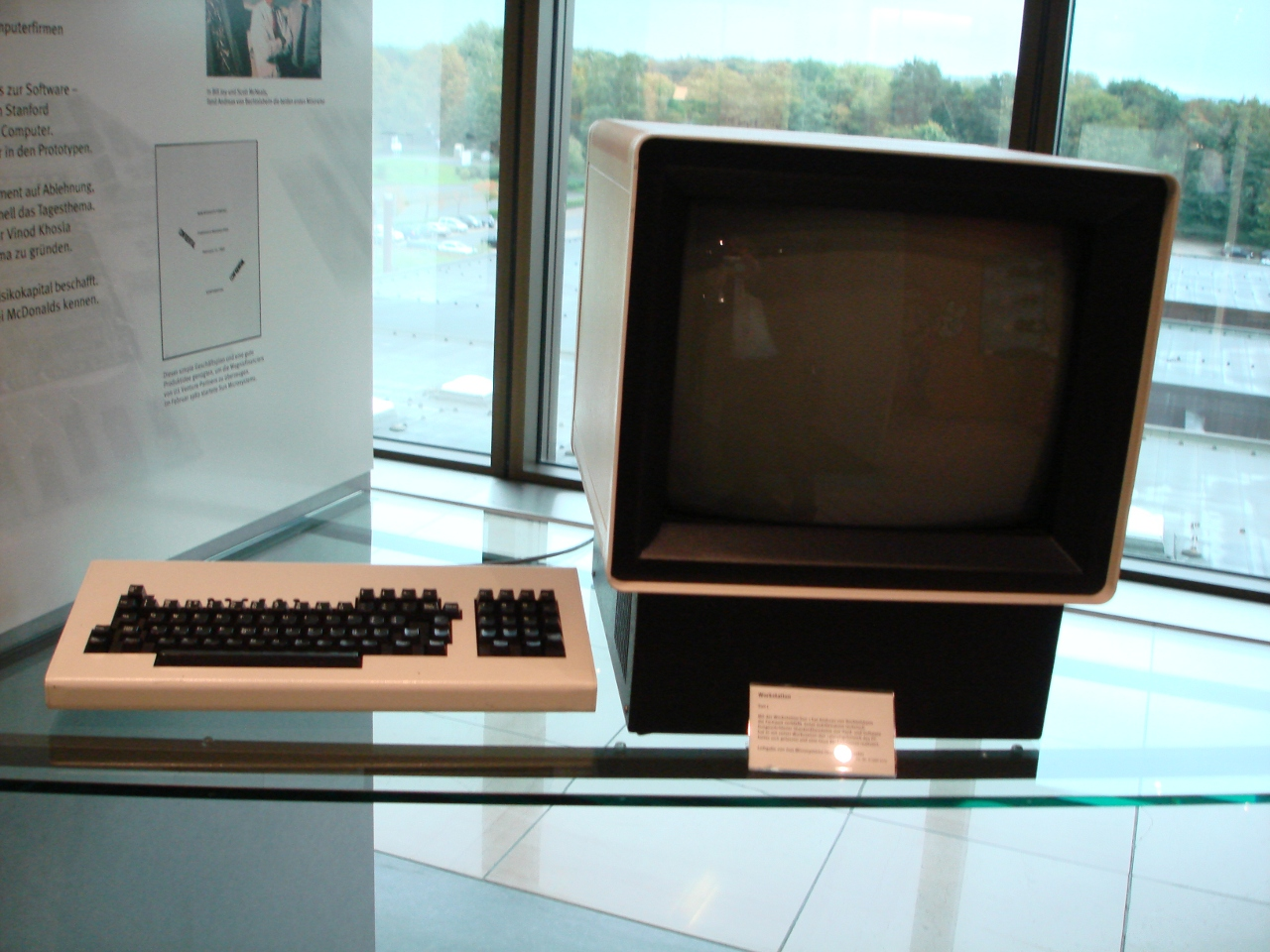
A Sun-1/100 desktop workstation

The 3M computer industrial goal was first proposed in the early 1980s by Raj Reddy and his colleagues at Carnegie Mellon University (CMU) as a minimum specification for academic and technical workstations. It requires at least one megabyte of memory, a one megapixel display with 1024×1024 1-bit pixels, and one million instructions per second (MIPS) of processing power. It was also often said that it should cost no more than one "megapenny" or $10,000 (equivalent to $39,000 in 2025).

At that time, a typical desktop computer such as an early IBM Personal Computer might have 1/8 of a megabyte of memory (128K), 1/4 of a million pixels (640 × 400 monochrome display), and run at 1/3 million instructions per second (5 MHz 8088).

The concept was inspired by the Xerox Alto which had been designed in the 1970s at the Xerox Palo Alto Research Center. Several Alto workstations were donated to CMU, Stanford, and MIT in 1979.

An early 3M computer is the PERQ Workstation made by Three Rivers Computer Corporation. It has a 1 million P-codes (Pascal instructions) per second processor, 256 KB of RAM (upgradeable to 1 MB), and a 768×1024 pixel display on a 15-inch (380 mm) display. Though not quite a true 3M machine, it was used as the initial 3M machine for the CMU Scientific Personal Integrated Computing Environment (SPICE) workstation project.

The Stanford University Network SUN workstation, designed by Andy Bechtolsheim in 1980, is another example. It was then commercialized by Sun Microsystems in 1982. Apollo Computer (in the Route 128 region) announced the Apollo/Domain computer in 1981. By 1986, CMU stated that it expected at least two companies to introduce 3M computers by the end of the year, with academic pricing of $3,000 and retail pricing of $5,000, and Stanford University planned to deploy them in computer labs. The first "megapenny" 3M workstation was the Sun-2/50 diskless desktop workstation with a list price of $8,900 in 1986.

The original NeXT Computer was introduced in 1988 as a 3M machine by Steve Jobs, who first heard this term at Brown University. The NeXT MegaPixel Display has just over 930,000 pixels with 2 bits per pixel. However, floating-point performance, powered with the Motorola 68882 FPU is only about 0.25 megaflops.

Modern desktop computers exceed the 3M memory and speed requirements by many thousands of times, however the number of pixels is only about 2—8 times larger, but they are full color so each pixel uses at least 24 times as many bits.
