= SUN workstation =

Modular computer system

The SUN workstation is a modular computer system that was designed at Stanford University in the early 1980s. It became the seed technology for many commercial products, including the original workstations from Sun Microsystems.

== History ==
In 1979 Xerox donated some Alto computers, developed at their Palo Alto Research Center, to Stanford's Computer Science Department, as well as other universities that were developing the early Internet. The Altos were connected using Ethernet to form several local area networks. The SUN's design was inspired by that of the Alto, but used lower-cost modular components. The project name was derived from the initials of the campus' Stanford University Network.

Professor Forest Baskett suggested the best-known configuration: a relatively low-cost personal workstation for computer-aided logic design work. The design created a 3M computer: a 1 million instructions per second (MIPS) processor, 1 Megabyte of memory and a 1 Megapixel raster scan bit-map graphics display. Sometimes the $10,000 estimated price was called the fourth "M" — a "Megapenny". Director of Computer Facilities Ralph Gorin suggested other configurations and initially funded the project. Graduate student Andy Bechtolsheim designed the hardware, with several other students and staff members assisting with software and other aspects of the project. Vaughan Pratt became unofficial faculty leader of the project in 1980.

Three key technologies made the SUN workstation possible: very large-scale integration (VLSI) integrated circuits, Multibus and ECAD. ECAD (Electronic Computer Assisted Design, now known as Electronic design automation) allowed a single designer to quickly develop systems of greater complexity. The Stanford Artificial Intelligence Laboratory (SAIL) had pioneered personal display terminals, but the 1971 system was showing its age. Bechtolsheim used the Stanford University Drawing System (SUDS) to design the SUN boards on the SAIL system. SUDS had been originally developed for the Foonly computer. The Structured Computer Aided Logic Design (SCALD) package was then used to verify the design, automate layout and produce wire-wrapped prototypes and then printed circuit boards.

VLSI integrated circuits finally allowed for a high-level of hardware functionality to be included in a single chip. The graphics display controller was the first board designed, published in 1980. A Motorola 68000 CPU, along with memory, a parallel port controller and a serial port controller, were included on the main CPU board designed by Bechtolsheim. The third board was an interface to the 2.94 Mbits/second experimental Ethernet (before the speed was standardized at 10 Mbits/second).

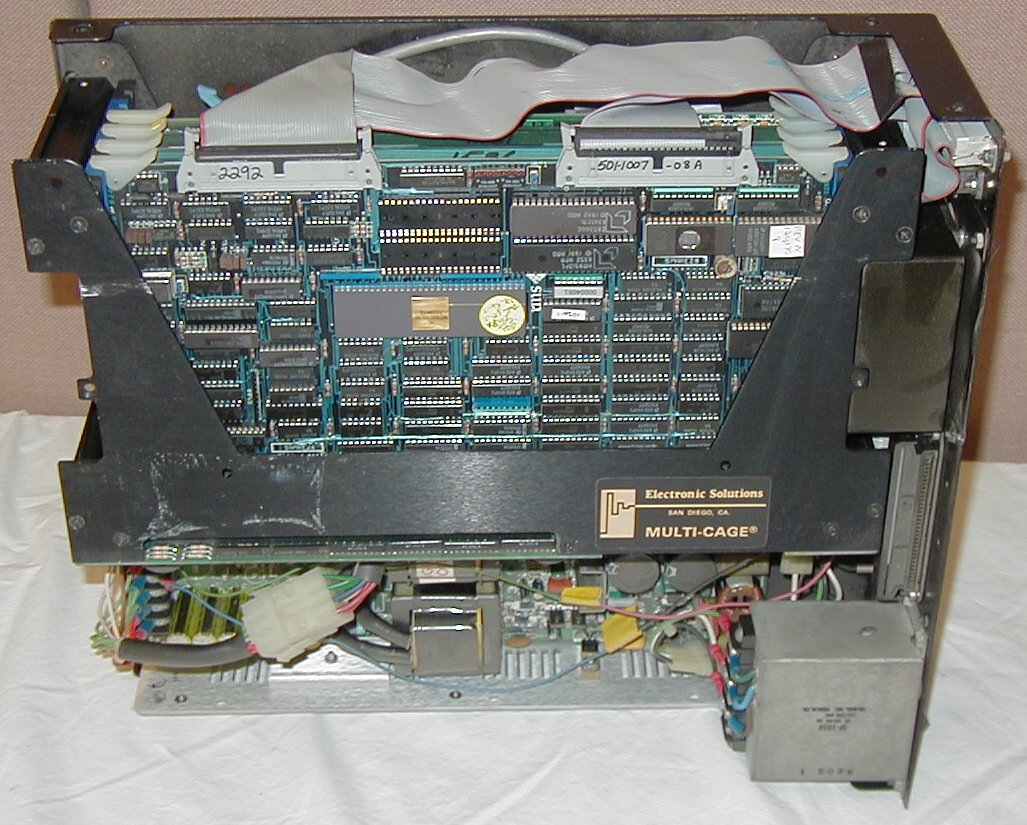
The three boards (plus memory extension) as later marketed by Sun Microsystems circa 1983

The Multibus computer interface made it possible to use standard enclosures, and to use circuit boards made by different vendors to create other configurations. For example, the CPU board combined with a multi-port serial controller created a terminal server (called a TIP, for Terminal Interface Processor) which connected many terminals to the Digital Equipment Corporation time-sharing systems at Stanford or anywhere on the Internet. Configuring multiple Ethernet controllers (including commercial ones, once they were available) with one CPU board created a router. William Yeager wrote the software, which was later adopted and evolved by Cisco Systems on its version of the hardware. Les Earnest licensed the CPU board for one of the first commercial low-cost laser printer controllers at a company called Imagen. The processor board was combined with a prototype high performance graphics display by students of James H. Clark. That group later formed Silicon Graphics Incorporated.

Eventually about ten SUN workstations were built during 1981 and 1982, after which Stanford declined to build any more. Bechtolsheim then licensed the hardware design to several vendors, but was frustrated that none of them had chosen to build a workstation.

Vinod Khosla, also from Stanford, convinced Bechtolsheim along with Scott McNealy to found Sun Microsystems in order to build the Sun-1 workstation, which included some improvements to the earlier design.

Other faculty members who did research using SUN workstations included David Cheriton, Brian Reid, and John Hennessy.

== See also ==
- NuMachine, a similar MIT project
