= Scott McNealy =

American businessman and tech entrepreneur

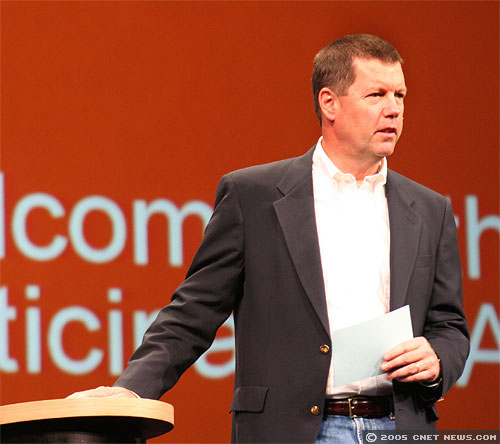
- McNealy in 2005
- Born: November 13, 1954 (age 72); Columbus, Indiana
- Education: Harvard University (BA); Stanford University (MBA)
- Known for: CEO and co-founder, Sun Microsystems
- Spouse: Susan Ingemanson (m. 1994)
- Children: Maverick, Colt, Dakota, Scout
- Website: Sun Microsystems Scott McNealy bio

Scott G. McNealy (born November 13, 1954) is an American businessman. He is most famous for co-founding the computer technology company Sun Microsystems in 1982 along with Vinod Khosla, Bill Joy, and Andy Bechtolsheim. In 2004, while still at Sun, McNealy founded Curriki, a free online education service. In 2011, he co-founded Wayin, a social intelligence and visualization company based in Denver. McNealy stepped down from his position as CEO of Wayin in 2016.

== Career ==
McNealy earned a Bachelor of Arts in economics from Harvard and an MBA from the Stanford Graduate School of Business. McNealy has self-deprecatingly referred to himself as a "golf major" rather than a computer scientist.

McNealy started out working at American Motors, where his father was vice chairman and vice president of marketing. He later became manufacturing director at Onyx Systems, a vendor of microprocessor-based Unix systems.

In 1982, he was approached by fellow Stanford alumnus Vinod Khosla to help provide the necessary organizational and business leadership for Sun Microsystems. Sun, along with companies such as Apple Inc., Silicon Graphics, 3Com, and Oracle Corporation, was part of a wave of successful startup companies in California's Silicon Valley during the early and mid-1980s. The name "Sun" was derived from co-founder Andy Bechtolsheim's original Stanford University Network (SUN) computer project, the SUN workstation.

In 1984, McNealy took over the CEO role from Khosla, who ultimately would leave the company in 1985. On April 24, 2006, McNealy stepped down as CEO after serving in that position for 22 years, and turned the job over to Jonathan I. Schwartz. McNealy is one of the few CEOs of a major corporation to have had a tenure of over twenty years.

According to the book The Decline and Fall of Nokia, Scott McNealy was the "dream candidate" to become CEO of Nokia in 2010. However, McNealy said he was not offered the job.

In 2017, Scott joined the golf app startup 18Birdies as advisor and equity partner.

In early 2018, he joined the Redis Labs advisory board.

=== Wayin ===
In 2010, the same year Oracle Corporation purchased Sun, McNealy co-founded the social media intelligence company Wayin. The new venture was not widely covered in the media; the day he invited reporters to his home to launch Wayin was the same day Apple co-founder Steve Jobs died. Their product is an application store for brands to self-publish interactive advertising campaigns using reusable digital assets, removing the bulk of cost involved in delivering multi-channel digital advertising.

Wayin sought out and merged with EngageSciences in 2016, to acquire senior staff and diversify their market. In May of that year, McNealy stepped down as CEO and EngageSciences head Richard Jones became CEO of the combined company. In July 2019, Wayin was acquired by Cheetah Digital.

== Personal life ==
McNealy was born to Marmalee Doris (née Noffke) and Raymond William McNealy Jr. (1927–2014), in Columbus, Indiana. McNealy is an Irish American. He grew up in Bloomfield Hills, Michigan, where his father, was vice chairman of the American Motors Corporation. He graduated from Cranbrook School; he later supported the campaign of fellow Cranbrook alumnus and 2012 presidential nominee Mitt Romney. Most of his work experience prior to joining Sun was in automotive manufacturing.

He is married to Susan Ingemanson. They lived in Portola Valley, CA, now in Nevada, and have four sons: Maverick (PGA Tour Golfer), Dakota, Colt, and Scout. He is known to be an enthusiastic ice hockey player and has been ranked as one of the best golfers in executive ranks.

He is the commissioner of the Alternative Golf Association (known as "Flogton").

== Positions at Sun ==
- Chairman of the board of directors from April 2006 to January 2010
- Chairman of the board of directors and chief executive officer from April 2004 to April 2006
- Chairman of the board of directors, president and chief executive officer from July 2002 to April 2004
- Chairman of the board of directors and chief executive officer from April 1999 to June 2002
- Chairman of the board of directors, president and chief executive officer from December 1984 to April 1999
- President and chief operating officer from February 1984 to December 1984
- Vice president of operations from February 1982 to February 1984

== Awards ==
In 1987, McNealy was named an Award Recipient of the EY Entrepreneur of the Year Award in the Northern California Region.

== Opinions ==
While at Sun, McNealy used the phrase “disagree and commit” (which later became a management principle adopted by other large cooperations) as early as some time between 1983 and 1991, as part of the line "Agree and commit, disagree and commit, or get out of the way".

In 1999, McNealy said, "You have zero privacy anyway. Get over it." Writer Stephen Manes criticized the statement in his Full Disclosure column: "He's right on the facts, wrong on the attitude.... Instead of 'getting over it', citizens need to demand clear rules on privacy, security, and confidentiality."

In 2003, McNealy described himself as a "raging libertarian", although he often supported and endorsed the Republican Party. In 2017, McNealy praised the 45th U.S. President, Donald Trump, for his free-market economic policies. On September 17, 2019, McNealy hosted a fundraiser for Donald Trump's re-election campaign.

Business positions
Preceded by Vinod Khosla	CEO of Sun Microsystems; 1984–2006	Succeeded by Jonathan Schwartz
Preceded by Owen Brown	President of Sun Microsystems; 1984–1999; 2002–2004	Succeeded by Edward Zander
Preceded by Edward Zander	President of Sun Microsystems; 1984–1999; 2002–2004	Succeeded by Jonathan Schwartz
Preceded by Vinod Khosla	Chairman of Sun Microsystems; 1984–2010	Company acquired by Oracle Corporation
