= William Raduchel =

William J. Raduchel
- Occupations: Independent director, angel investor, strategic advisor

William James Raduchel is an independent director, angel investor and strategic advisor. He was a professor of economics at Harvard for ten years, and an assistant dean at Harvard and Radcliffe. He has been an executive at Ruckus Network, Sun Microsystems, AOL Time Warner, Xerox Corporation, and McGraw-Hill. He also serves on boards for the Salvation Army and STEP (National Academy of Sciences).

Raduchel was born in Houghton, Michigan, to William Reece Raduchel and Olive Helena Raduchel.

He was once described as Scott McNealy's mentor since his early college days, convincing McNealy to study economics, and eventually joining McNealy at Sun. Before Sun, he recruited McNealy to join Onyx Computer to manage manufacturing.
