= Xylogics =

Xylogics, Inc.
- Formerly: Xylogic Systems, Inc.
- Type: Private
- Industry: Computer
- Founded: 1971; 55 years ago in Needham, Massachusetts
- Founders: Laurence Liebson; Robert Bushkoff; Stephen Rotman
- Defunct: 1995; 31 years ago
- Fate: Acquired by Bay Networks

Xylogics, Inc., formerly Xylogic Systems, Inc., was an American computer company independently active from 1971 to 1995. Originally headquartered in Needham, Massachusetts, the company produced a variety of hardware products for minicomputers, initially focusing on typesetting and word processing workstations based on DEC computers. The company also specialized in the design of disk controllers and networking hardware and software. The company was acquired by Bay Networks in 1995.

== History ==
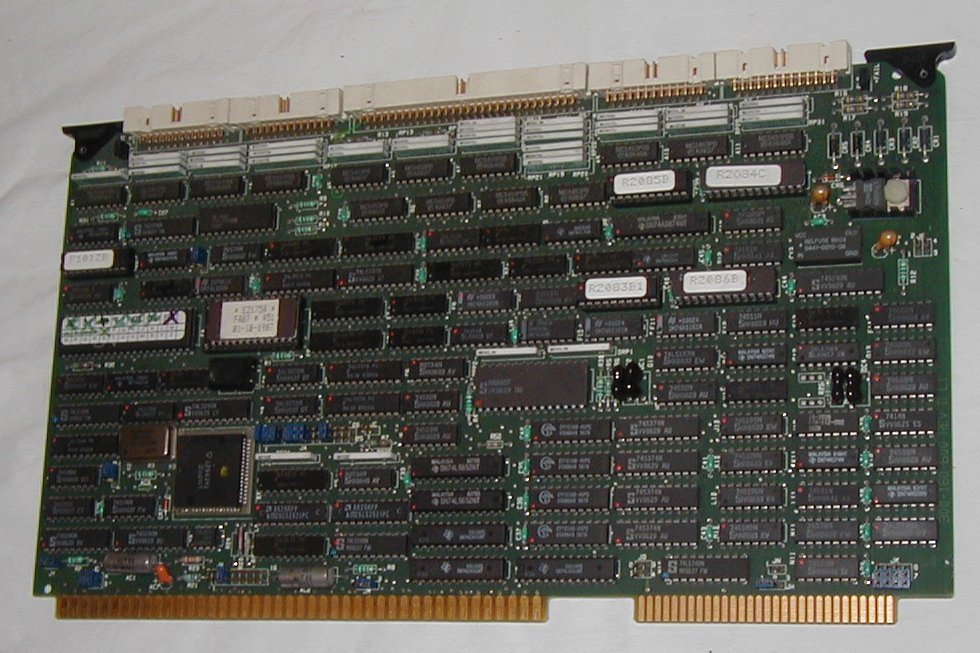
Xylogics Multibus 450 SMD Disk Controller Board

Xylogics was founded in 1971 by three former NASA employees: Laurence Liebson, Robert Bushkoff and Stephen Rotman. The company was originally named Xynetic Systems, but this name was already in use by a California company, so the group in Needham, Massachusetts, changed their name in late 1971 to Xylogic Systems. Their original business was the design and development of computerized newspaper typesetting and editing systems. The first system was developed for the Daytona Beach News Journal, with Farmington, New Mexico's Farmington Daily Times getting the second system. By 1972, Xylogics had grown to more than 15 people, and moved to Natick, Massachusetts. The company used the GRI minicomputer, and custom designed many circuit boards to support disk drives, paper tape punches and readers, and automatic capture of newswire service feeds. By 1974, the company had developed a CRT editing station, and offered systems of up to 4 computers and more than 50 terminals for newspaper or in-plant publishing to perform editing and typesetting. About this time, a second division was created to design and build disk controllers for DEC computers, derived in part from the successful designs and manufacturing capability developed for the newspaper business.

In 1976, a major customer of Xylogics, Dymo Graphics Systems, purchased the newspaper product line and hired most of the original developers. Dymo Graphics, of Wilmington, MA was the first company to develop laser technology for typesetting applications. Dymo Graphic Systems combined its typesetting equipment business with the Xylogics editing systems, and by 1978 had over 100 turnkey typesetting systems in use worldwide. The Xylogic Systems typesetting capability was the first with WYSIWYG (What You See Is What You Get) printing capability for Tabloid size page layout, and later full page layout. Capability included on-line classified ad capture with automated pricing, in addition to full page markup and typesetting.

In 1977, Dymo was purchased by Eselte Corporation, who wanted control of the highly successful "Dymo Label Maker" consumer product. Eselte sold the newspaper and typesetting business to ITEK Corporation in 1978, who wanted the laser technology IP. ITEK declined support to the newspaper and typesetting business, and in 1979, the newspaper product development and manufacturing staff of 150 engineers, technicians, assemblers, and field support personnel had dwindled to 2 by January 1980.

Xylogics continued building disk and other controllers for DEC hardware.

They also built serial terminal servers from 4-port to 72-port units under the product name Annex.

Xylogics was acquired by Bay Networks in December 1995 which in turn was acquired by Nortel in June 1998. After Nortel's bankruptcy in 2009, support for the remaining Annex products ended up with Avaya. Xylogics was located in Burlington, Massachusetts.

The Multibus based Xylogics 450 SMD and Xylogics 451 ESMD disk controllers along with Interphase Multibus SMD disk controllers were significant to the workstation and minicomputer industry during the 1980s as a low cost interface the low cost, high performance, high capacity SMD and ESMD disk drives available at the time. Sun-1, Sun-2 and Sun-3 servers and Silicon Graphics IRIS, HP/Apollo all used Xylogics 450 and 451 disk controllers.
