= Brian Reid (computer scientist) =

American computer scientist

- Born: 1949 (age 76–77)
- Education: Carnegie Mellon University
- Known for: Scribe; Internet firewalls Usenet maps
- Awards: Grace Murray Hopper Award (1982); Presidential Young Investigator Award
- Scientific career
- Workplaces: Stanford University; Digital Equipment Corporation; Google
- Thesis: Scribe: A Document Specification Language and its Compiler (1980)
- Doctoral advisor: Bob Sproull

Brian Keith Reid (born 1949) is an American computer scientist. He developed an early use of a markup language in his 1980 doctoral dissertation. His other principal interest has been computer networking and the development of the Internet.

== Education ==
Reid received his B.S. in physics from the University of Maryland, College Park in 1970, and then worked in industry for five years before entering graduate school at Carnegie Mellon University, where he was awarded a PhD in computer science in 1980.

His dissertation research developed the Scribe word processing system, for which he received the Association for Computing Machinery's Grace Murray Hopper Award in 1982. Reid presented a paper describing Scribe in the same conference session in 1981 in which Charles Goldfarb presented Generalized Markup Language (GML), the immediate predecessor of SGML.

== Career ==
From 1980–1987, he was an assistant professor of electrical engineering at Stanford University in the computer systems laboratory. There he was a recipient of the Presidential Young Investigator Award in 1984, working along with other new faculty such as John L. Hennessy, David R. Cheriton, and Mark Horowitz. Along with faculty such as Susan Owicki, Forest Baskett, and James H. Clark, his research concerned the connection of Stanford to the Internet, and the development of the SUN workstation. As the Stanford University Network attracted attacks, he became interested in possible network defenses.

He left Stanford in 1987 and was immediately hired by the Digital Equipment Corporation, first in the Western Research Laboratory (DEC WRL) under Forest Baskett in Palo Alto, California. Reid and Paul Vixie developed one of the first connections between a corporate network and the Internet, known as "Gatekeeper" after the character in the Ghostbusters film. The protection techniques developed evolved into what is now called a network firewall. Some early Internet attackers (such as Kevin Mitnick) would impersonate Reid in telephone calls in attempts to gain trust.

He experimented with electronic publishing with his USENET Cookbook project. In 1987, he and John Gilmore created the alt.* hierarchy on Usenet. He also created and ran the "USENET readership report", which sampled the reading habits of volunteer news readers, tried to extrapolate them across the entire population of the USENET, and reported them monthly to the news.lists newsgroup.

From 1986 through 1995, Reid produced a variety of maps of the USENET in PostScript, showing both its geographical reach and its volumes of traffic flow.

In 1995 he became director of his own group, the Network Systems Laboratory (DEC NSL). The DEC NSL developed one of the largest Internet exchange points as the Internet became available for commercial use in the 1990s. One of his employees was Anita Borg, who founded the group Systers and the Grace Hopper Celebration of Women in Computing while at NSL. DEC NSL and WRL developed AltaVista, one of the first web search engines. In 1998, he was invited to give a keynote talk at the Markup Technologies conference, discussing 20 years of history in the technology.

In 1999, he left DEC to work at Bell Labs' Silicon Valley site until it was shut down. In February 2001, he taught for one year at the Carnegie Mellon Silicon Valley campus of CMU.

== Google ==
In June 2002, Reid became director of operations at Google. His only written review was from Wayne Rosing, which was positive. In October 2003 he was moved to a program with no funding and no staff, while his former duties were taken over by Urs Hölzle, who was 15 years younger. He was fired by Larry Page (who was 30 at the time) in February 2004, after being told he was not a "cultural fit" by Rosing, and that his ideas were "too old to matter" by Hölzle, according to Reid. It was nine days before the company's initial public offering (IPO) was announced, allegedly costing him 119,000 stock options with a strike price of $0.30, which would have been worth approximately $10 million at the $85 IPO price. Reid estimated that given later appreciation, his unvested stock options would have been worth at least $45 million if he had stayed there.

=== Legal case ===
After retaining Duane Morris as counsel, Reid proceeded to sue Google in July 2004 for discrimination on the basis of age and disability. He was 52 years old and had been diagnosed as having diabetes while at Google. Google retained Wilson Sonsini Goodrich & Rosati, which defended the case on the grounds that Reid was allegedly told he was not a "cultural fit". In September 2005, the Santa Clara Superior Court initially granted summary judgment against him. On October 4, 2007, the California Sixth District Court of Appeal overturned the lower court's verdict and allowed the lawsuit to proceed. Google appealed that decision to the California Supreme Court, which granted review in February 2008.

=== Case review ===
The court granted review to decide two questions, one substantive and one procedural: (1) should an employee be allowed to sue an employer for hostile "stray remarks" by employees who were not directly involved in the allegedly discriminatory decision at issue; and (2) are specific objections to evidence at the summary judgment stage waived when the trial court fails to rule on specific objections despite oral requests that the trial court do so. The parties thoroughly briefed the issues on the merits; next, the court sat on the case for more than a year; then asked for further supplemental briefing from the parties in April 2010 on the procedural question; and finally scheduled oral argument for May 26, 2010.

On August 5, 2010, in an opinion by Justice Ming Chin, the court affirmed the Court of Appeal decision in favor of Reid and remanded to the lower courts for further proceedings. The Court refused to adopt the "stray remarks" doctrine pioneered by U.S. Supreme Court Justice Sandra Day O'Connor, because remarks by non-decisionmakers may be circumstantial evidence relevant to discriminatory actions (in the sense that hostile co-workers can manipulate a supervisor); and written objections to evidence are preserved for appeal regardless of whether the trial court rules upon them or whether counsel even argues them orally before the court. In other words, Google won on the procedural question, but Reid won on the substantive question, meaning that he would be able to introduce a much broader range of evidence of Google's alleged atmosphere of discrimination to the trier of fact.

The case attracted media attention, with briefs filed by the AARP on Reid's behalf and the California Employment Law Council for Google. The case was settled out of court for undisclosed terms.

From July 2005 to 2019, Reid worked at the Internet Systems Consortium, with various titles including head of engineering, operations, and communication.

== Personal life ==
Reid is an active photographer and has sponsored the Leica User's Group, an e-mail discussion list, for almost two decades.

Reid is a practicing Anglican and president of the Society of Archbishop Justus. He is an editor of Anglicans Online and sat on the board of Doane Academy, an Episcopal Pre K-12 school in Burlington, New Jersey.
