= Plexus (disambiguation) =

A plexus is a network of nerves or blood vessels.

Plexus may also refer to:

== Science and medicine ==
- Nervous plexus, a branching network of intersecting nerves
- Choroid plexus, a network of cells that produces the cerebrospinal fluid in the ventricles of the brain
- Venous plexus, a congregation of multiple veins
- Cardiac plexus, a congregation of nerves situated at the base of the heart that innervates the heart
- Celiac plexus, a complex network of nerves located in the abdomen
- Plexus ricei, an extinct Ediacaran organism

== Other uses ==
- Plexus Computers, a defunct American computer company
- Plexus, a 1953 novel by Henry Miller, part of The Rosy Crucifixion trilogy
- Plexus Publishing, an imprint of Information Today, Inc.
- The Plexus Rangers, characters in the comic book series American Flagg!
- "Plexus", a song by Joe Morris from Elsewhere, 1996
