= USENET Cookbook =

The USENET Cookbook was an experiment in electronic publishing conducted by Brian Reid in 1985–1987, several years before the Web. Reid distinguishes between electronic printing (the production of individual documents) and electronic publishing (the full process including dissemination).

The USENET cookbook was a collaboratively-produced cookbook. Recipes were solicited from contributors worldwide. They were heavily edited for style and content and distributed by email weekly; later, they were distributed on the USENET newsgroup alt.gourmand. Recipes were distributed both as plain ASCII text, and marked up in troff, a widely available system on Unix systems. Much of Reid's effort was devoted to the workflow aspects of publication.

There were about 300 contributors and 13000 subscribers to its regular updates, and over 500 recipes collected. The recipes were shown copyrighted by the USENET Community Trust with the notice:

Permission to copy without fee all or part of this material is granted provided that the copies are not made or distributed for direct commercial advantage, the USENET copyright notice and the title of the newsgroup and its date appear, and notice is given that copying is by permission of the USENET Community Trust or the original contributor.

The recipes continue to circulate widely today on the Web.
