= Plexus Computers =

Defunct American computer company

Plexus Computers, Inc.
- Type: Private
- Industry: Computer
- Founded: September 1980; 46 years ago in Santa Clara, California, United States
- Founders: Robert F. Marsh; Curtis Myers
- Defunct: July 1989; 37 years ago
- Fate: Acquired by Recognition Equipment, Inc.
- Number of employees: 230 (1987, peak)

Plexus Computers, Inc., was an American computer company active from 1980 to 1989 and based in Santa Clara, California. Founded by the ex-principals of Onyx Systems, Plexus primarily manufactured minicomputers and microcomputers running Unix. The company was best known for its Motorola 68000–based computer systems. The company went bankrupt and was acquired by Recognition Equipment, Inc., in 1989.

== History ==
Plexus Computers, Inc., was founded in September 1980 in Santa Clara, California, by Robert F. "Bob" Marsh and Curtis "Kip" Myers. Both had previously founded Onyx Systems, a pioneering manufacturer of microprocessor-based Unix systems, in 1978. After leaving Onyx in 1980, Marsh and Myers secured over $18.5 million in startup capital from 17 large investment firms—including Kleiner Perkins, Hambrecht & Quist, and L.F. Rothschild—to found Plexus.

The company initially targeted the minicomputer market, a field traditionally dominated by Digital Equipment Corporation. Under the leadership of chairman Marsh, Plexus positioned itself as a "minicomputer company using supermicro technology", specifically aiming to capture the original equipment manufacturer (OEM) and value-added reseller (VAR) markets that had traditionally relied on larger minicomputer systems. The company settled on Multibus, a computer bus commonly used by early microprocessor-based Unix systems, to provide the most flexibility for its OEM and VAR customers. To address the bottlenecks of early Unix's I/O system, which frequently overwhelmed a CPU by requiring the kernel to handle characters individually, Plexus developed the Intelligent Communications Processor (ICP), a custom component that offloads character handling from the main CPU, using direct memory access to communicate with the kernel in more efficient data blocks. The ICP allowed Plexus hardware to rival the performance of contemporary superminicomputers.

Plexus introduced its first system, the P/40, at COMDEX/Fall in November 1981. The P/40 used Zilog's Z8000 microprocessor and ran Version 7 Unix, supporting up to 24 concurrent users. The first units of the P/40 shipped to customers in late 1981. It was followed in February 1982 by the P/25, a lower-end model designed for up to 16 concurrent users. The P/25 was the first computer system to ship with Unix System III, which was introduced shortly after the P/40 in November 1981.

The company expanded rapidly in the early 1980s, with annual revenues climbing from $3.2 million in 1982 to roughly $24 million by 1984. With a couple of year of its foundation, Plexus had offices across 13 states, including Alaska and Hawaii. In November 1982, Marsh hired William D. "Bill" Jobe from Data General to become Plexus's chief executive officer (CEO). Jobe saw Plexus achieve profitability in the third quarter of 1983, maintaining a focus on aggressive growth over immediate high-margin returns. Unlike competitors such as Convergent Technologies, Plexus typically focused on smaller accounts, moving 100 to 200 units annually. An exception to the rule came after it secured a major $40-million agreement with Philips/Micom in 1983, although the deal fell through in 1984.

Plexus shifted away from the Z8000 microprocessor in favor of the more powerful Motorola 68000 family in 1982. In January 1983, the company debuted its first 68000-based systems with P/35 and the P/60. Both systems feature the original Motorola 68000 and ran Unix System III. The P/35 is a desktop unit supporting up to 16 users, while the P/60 is a deskside units supporting up to 40 users.

While the company maintained its position in the high-end multiuser market, it faced increasing competition from lower-end Unix providers like Altos and Fortune Systems, prompting the company to develop a system supporting fewer than eight users. In November 1984, Plexus released the P/15, featuring the Motorola 68010 and supporting up to eight users. Plexus complemented it with the higher-end P/20 in June 1985, featuring the same Motorola 68010 and supporting up to 16 users. The P/15 was the first of Plexus's systems to ship with the popular Unix System V; the P/20 shipped with System V Release 2.

Jobe left Plexus to co-found MIPS Computer Systems in San Jose in October 1984. Following Jobe's exit, Plexus struggled with financial hardship, posting losses starting in the fall of 1984 before returning to profitability in March 1985, the same month the company installed a new CEO, Paul Klein, who was formerly an executive for the Milpitas-based computer company Braegen. In January 1986, Plexus released the P/75, featuring the Motorola 68020 and supporting up to 80 users. The following June, the company released the P/55, also based on the Motorola 68020 and supporting up to 32 users. In March 1987, it debuted two new systems: the P/95, a 68020-based system supporting up to 128 users; and the Extended Data Processing System (XDP), a turnkey workstation pairing either a P/55, a P/75, or a P/95 (as part of its XDP DataServer) with an IBM PC AT–compatible desktop. The latter was intended as a graphical workstation capable of image processing, data processing, and document management. Plexus rounded out this new lineup in August 1987, with the 68020-based P/90, which supported up to 64 users, slotting between the P/75 and the P/95. Plexus augmented its XDP system to support the P/90 as an option for the XDP DataServer.

At its peak in March 1987, Pleuxs had 230 employees, 18 nationwide sales offices, between 16 and 18 worldwide distributors, 60 service bureaus, and subsidiaries in West Germany, the United Kingdom, and France. As the Unix market matured in the late 1980s, Plexus made a pivot from being a vendor of general-purpose Unix systems to becoming a integrator of data processing systems. This pivot was encouraged by strong sales of the company's XDP; while its previous systems sold for an average of $25,000, the XDP launched with a base price of $75,000, with many common configurations often costing several hundred thousands of dollars. The XDP generated $15 million in sales within nine months, leading Plexus to expand its direct sales department. Under this new distribution strategy, Plexus now directly competed with major document management companies such as Eastman Kodak and Wang Laboratories.

Arete Systems Corporation, a rival Unix systems maker based in San Jose, proposed a merger with Plexus in April 1988, with the combined company retaining the Arete name. Both companies at that point had a combined revenue of $65 million. The deal was called off in July that year, with executives from Plexus and Arete reportedly disagreeing over the valuations of their companies and the discovery of significant overlaps in product lines and distribution channels.

Although Plexus generated $27 million in revenue in fiscal year 1988 under its new business plan, this was $3 million shy of its 1987 projections. This prompted several of the company's venture capital firms to withdraw financial support early in 1989. In March that year, the company laid off roughly three-quarters of its 200 employees and cancelled all hardware development, shipments, and maintenance, focusing strictly on software, specially its DBMS and software development toolkits for the XDP. Less than a week later, Plexus filed for Chapter 11 bankruptcy, citing $5 million in debt and the withdrawal of financial support. In July 1989, Recognition Equipment, Inc., of Dallas, Texas, acquired Plexus for $5 million.
