= Sun-2 =

Computer

Sun Microsystems Sun 2
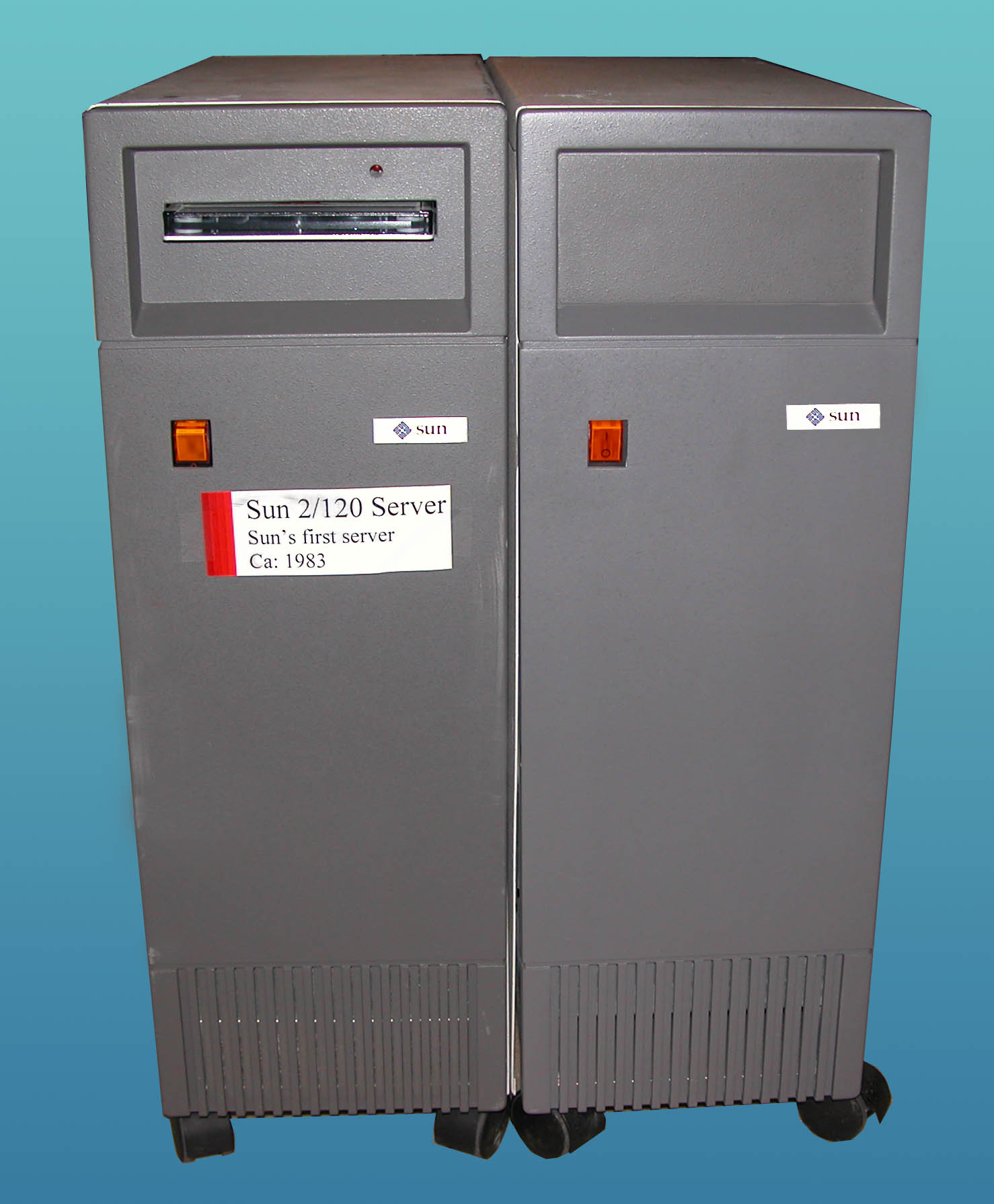
- Sun 2/120 server with SMD disk tower
- Developer: Sun Microsystems
- Type: Workstation
- Released: November 1983; 42 years ago
- Introductory price: 2/120: US$29,300 (equivalent to $71,000 in 2024) 2/160: US$48,800 (equivalent to $118,000 in 2024) 2/170: US$79,500 (equivalent to $192,000 in 2024)
- CPU: Motorola 68010
- Predecessor: Sun-1
- Successor: Sun-3

The Sun-2 series of UNIX workstations and servers was launched by Sun Microsystems in November 1983. As the name suggests, the Sun-2 represented the second generation of Sun systems, superseding the original Sun-1 series. The Sun-2 series used a 10 MHz Motorola 68010 microprocessor with a proprietary Sun-2 Memory Management Unit (MMU), which enabled it to be the first Sun architecture to run a full virtual memory UNIX implementation, SunOS 1.0, based on 4.1BSD. Early Sun-2 models were based on the Intel Multibus architecture, with later models using VMEbus, which continued to be used in the successor Sun-3 and Sun-4 families.

Sun-2 systems were supported in SunOS until version 4.0.3.

A port to support Multibus Sun-2 systems in NetBSD was begun in January 2001 from the Sun-3 support in the NetBSD 1.5 release. Code supporting the Sun-2 began to be merged into the NetBSD tree in April 2001. sun2 is considered a tier 2 support platform as of NetBSD 7.0.1.

== Sun-2 models ==
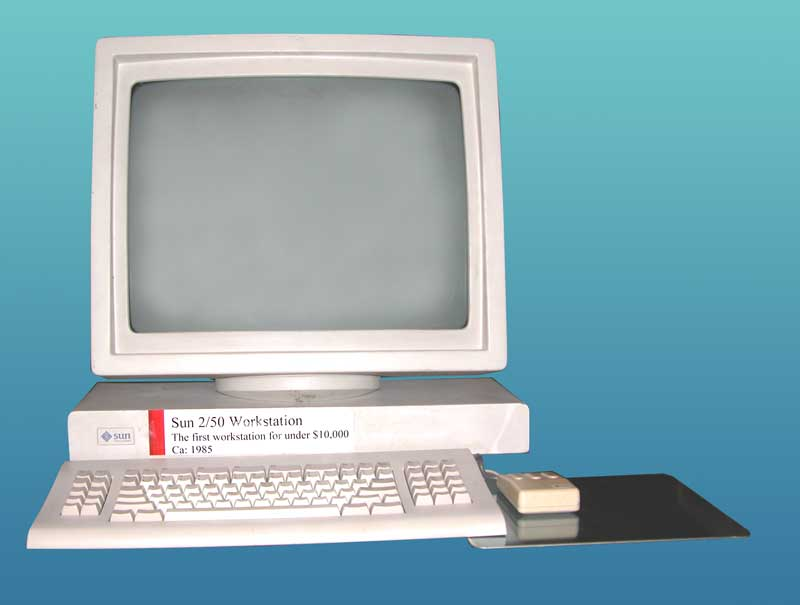
Sun 2/50 diskless workstation

Models are listed in approximately chronological order.

Model	CPU board	Display	Max. RAM	Chassis
2/120	Sun-2 Multibus or Sun-2 Multibus Prime	Monochrome	8 MB	9-slot Multibus (deskside)
2/170	Sun-2 Multibus or Sun-2 Multibus Prime	Optional	8 MB	15-slot Multibus (rackmount)
2/50	Sun 2050 VME	Monochrome	8 MB	2-slot VME (desktop)
2/130	Sun 2050 VME	Monochrome	8 MB	12-slot VME (deskside)
2/160	Sun 2050 VME	Color	8 MB	12-slot VME (deskside)

A desktop disk and tape sub-system was introduced for the Sun-2/50 desktop workstation. It could hold a 5 ¼" disk drive and 5 ¼" tape drive. It used DD-50 (sometimes erroneously referred to as DB-50) connectors for its SCSI cables, a Sun specific design. It was often referred to as a "Sun Shoebox".

Sun-2 Disk and Tape Sub-System
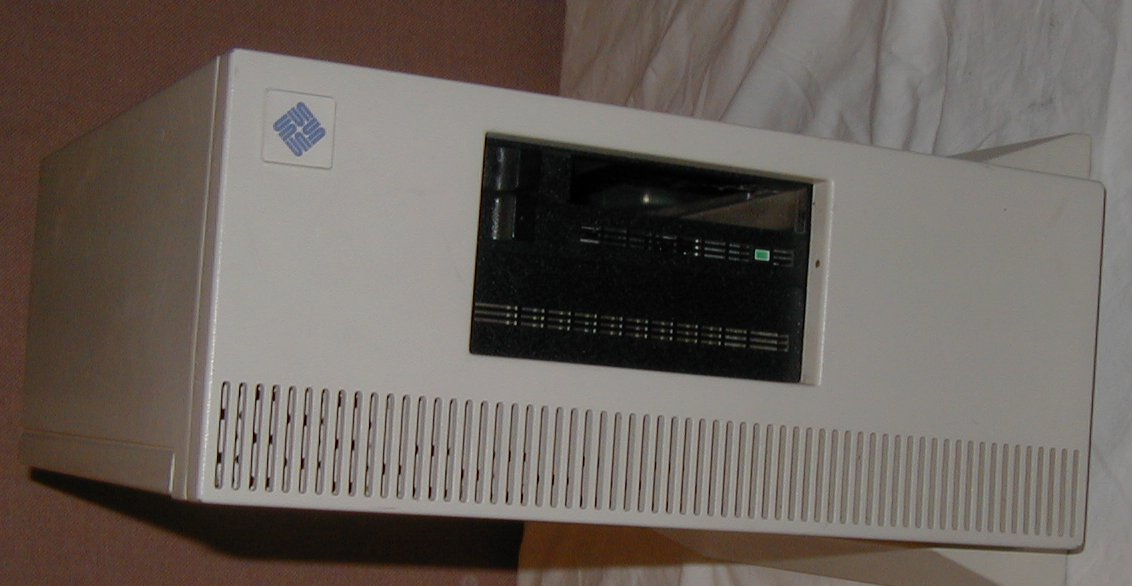
Sun-2 Disk and Tape Sub-System (front)

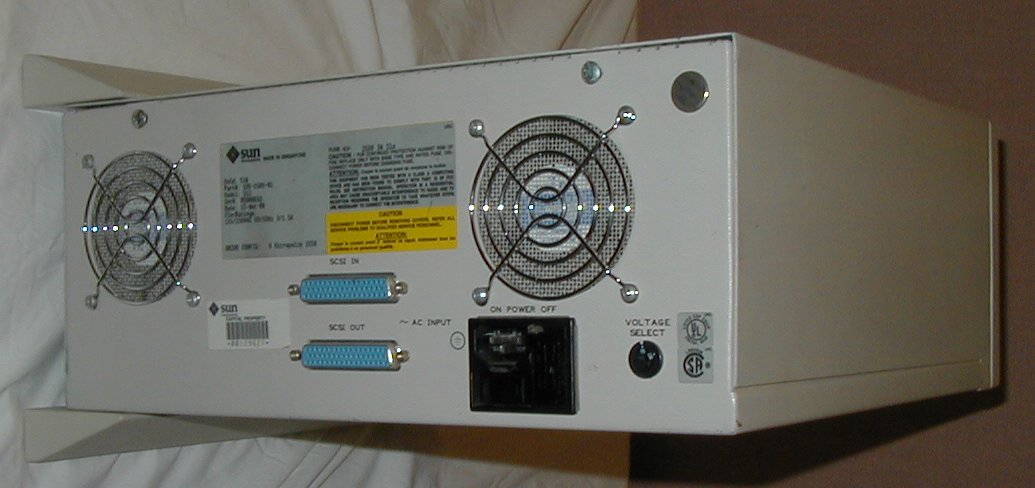
Sun-2 Disk and Tape Sub-System (rear)

Sun-1 systems upgraded with Sun-2 Multibus CPU boards were sometimes referred to as the 2/100U (upgraded Sun-100) or 2/150U (upgraded Sun-150).

A typical configuration of a monochrome 2/120 with 4 MB of memory, 71 MB SCSI disk and 20 MB 1/4" SCSI tape cost $29,300 (1986 US price list).

A color 2/160 with 8 MB of memory, two 71 MB SCSI disks and 60 MB 1/4" SCSI tape cost $48,800 (1986 US price list).

A Sun 2/170 server with 4 MB of memory, no display, two Fujitu Eagle 380 MB disk drive, one Xylogics 450 SMD disk controller, a 6250 bpi 1/2 inch tape drive and a 72" rack cost $79,500 (1986 US price list).

== Sun-2 hardware ==
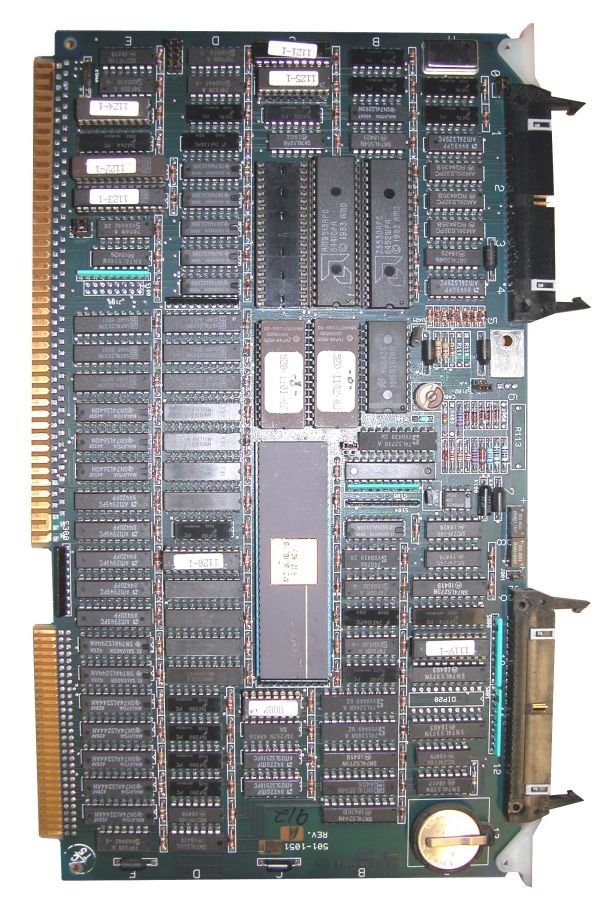
Sun-2 Multibus Prime CPU

=== Sun 2 Multibus systems ===
Sun 2/120 (9 slot deskside) and 2/170 (15 slot rackmount) systems were based on the Multibus architecture. The CPU board was based on a 10 MHz 68010 processor with a proprietary Sun Memory Management Unit (MMU) and could address 8 MB of physical and 16 MB of virtual memory. The top 1 MB of physical memory address space was reserved for the monochrome frame buffer. The Multibus CPU board supported the Sun-1 parallel keyboard and mouse as well as two serial ports.

Sun-2 Multibus circuit boards
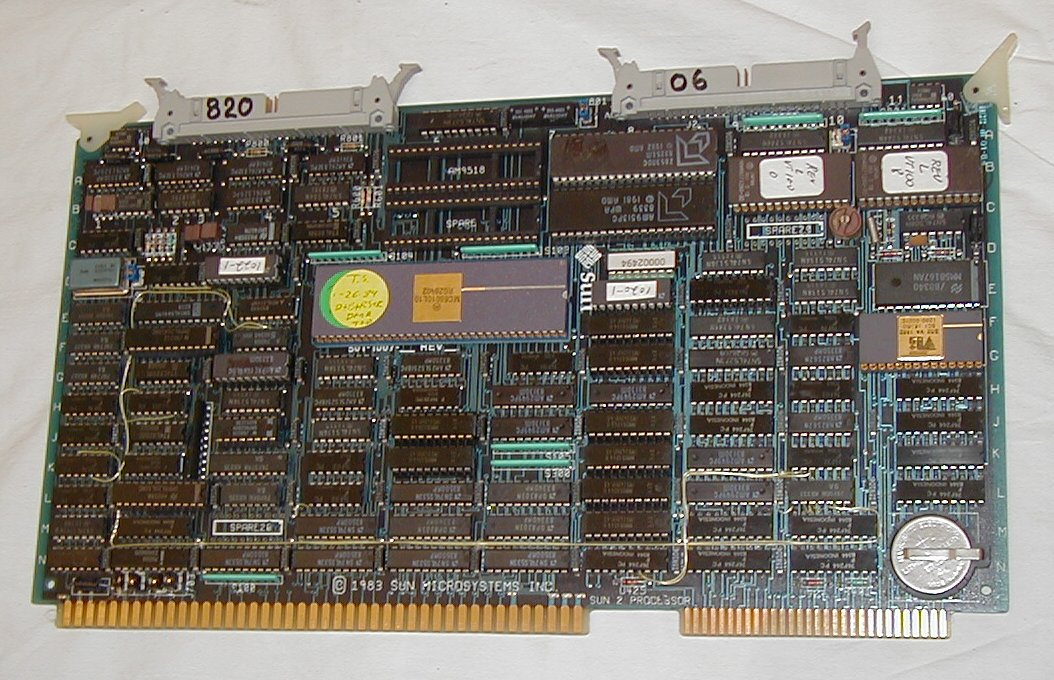
Sun-2 Multibus CPU board

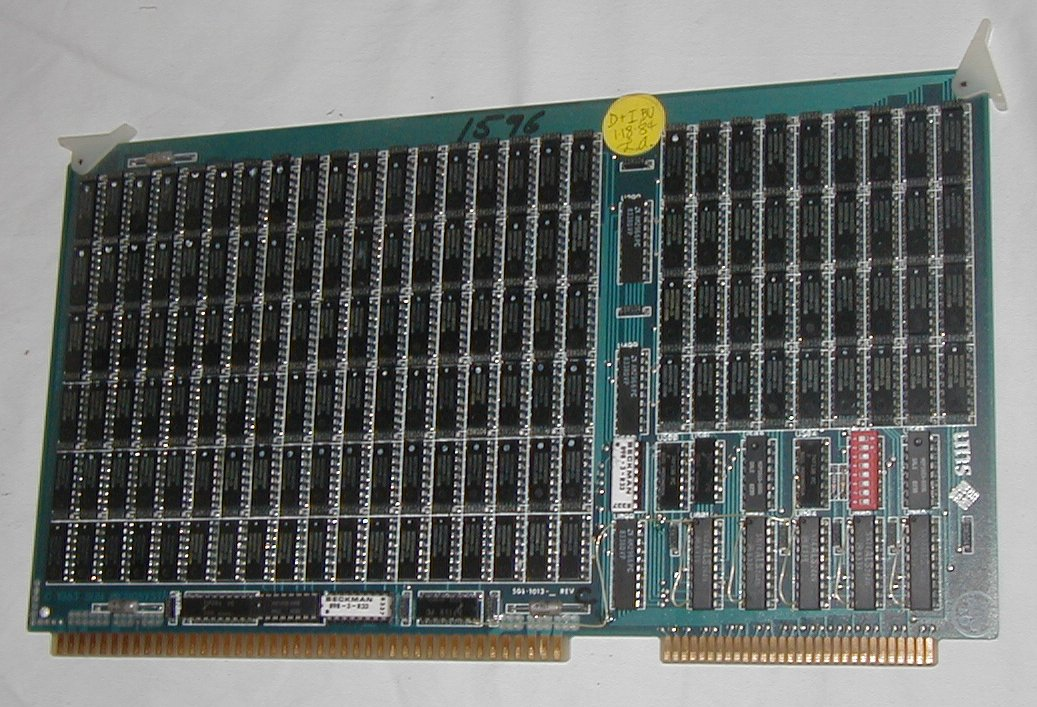
Sun-2 Multibus 1 MB memory board

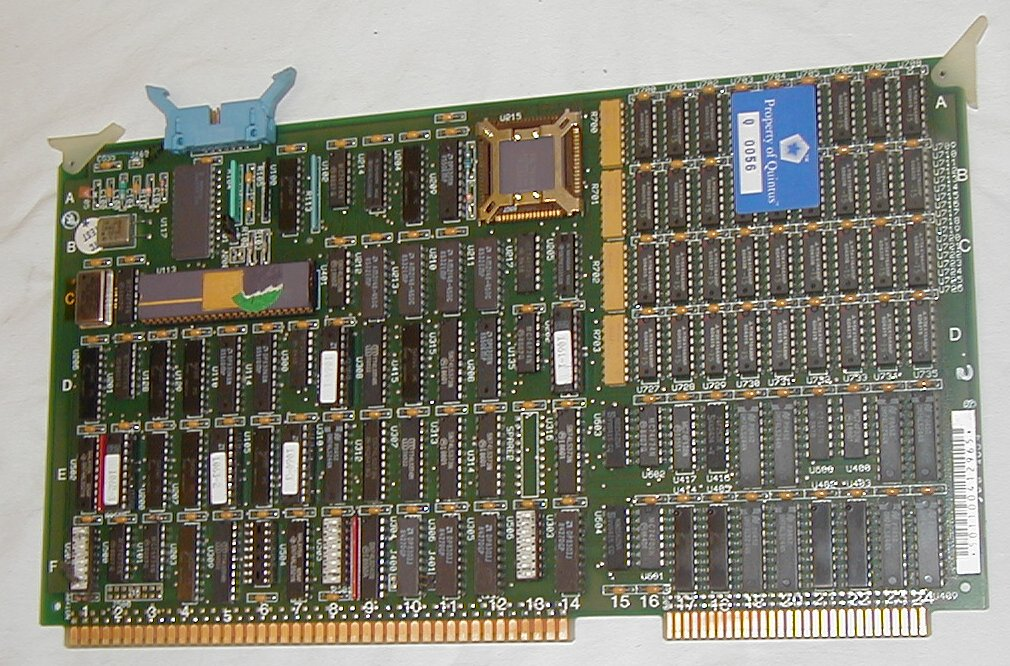
Sun-2 Multibus Ethernet board

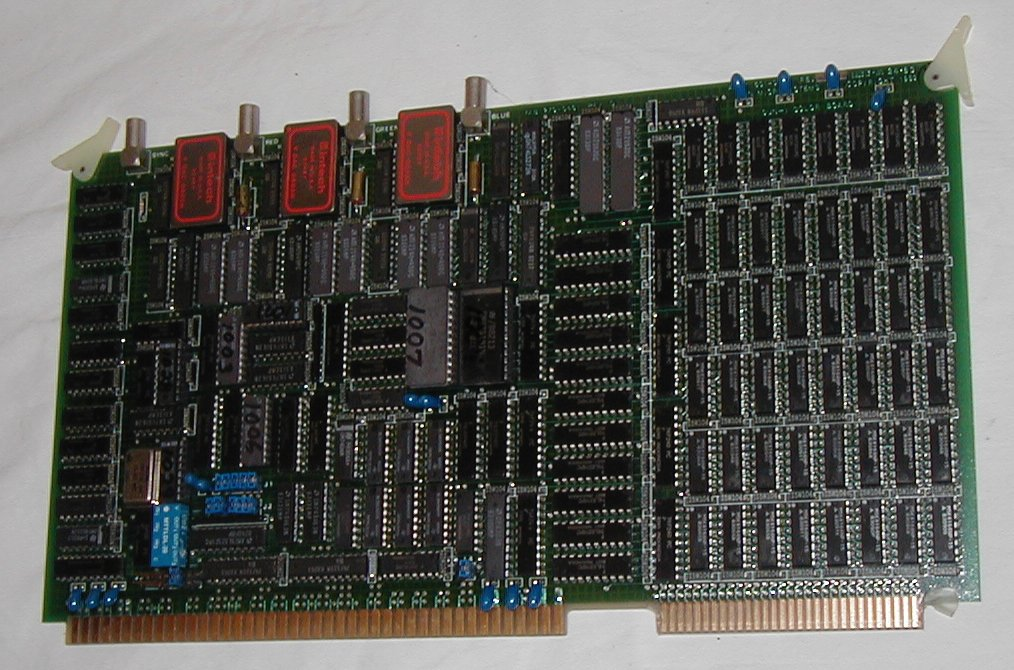
Sun-1 Multibus color graphics board

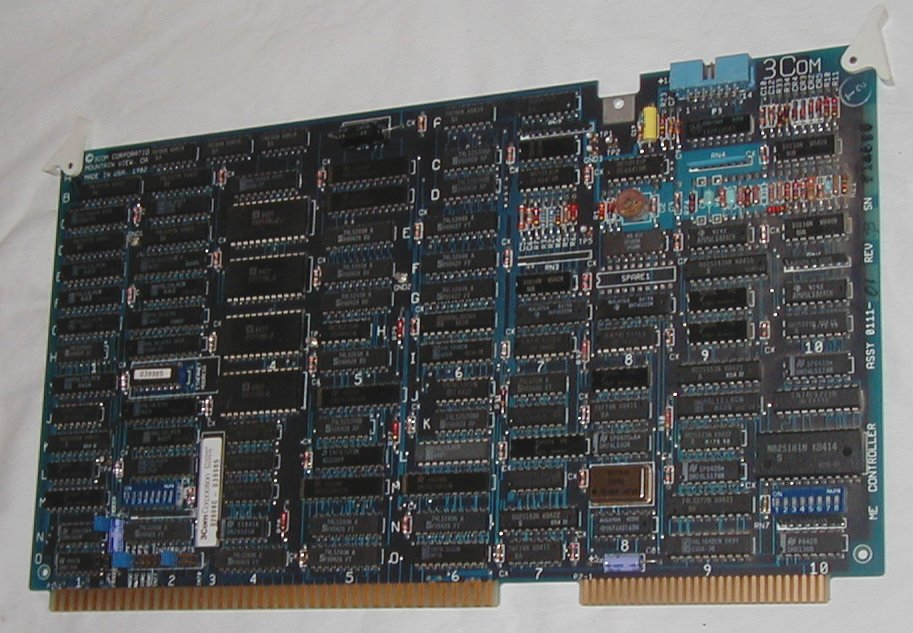
3Com Multibus Ethernet board

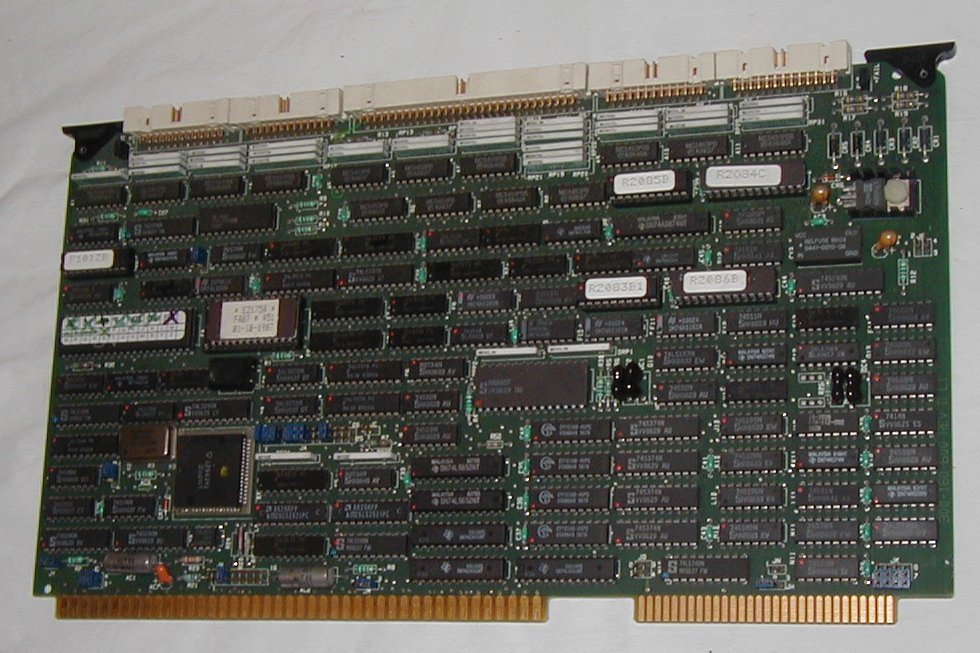
Xylogics Multibus SMD disk controller board

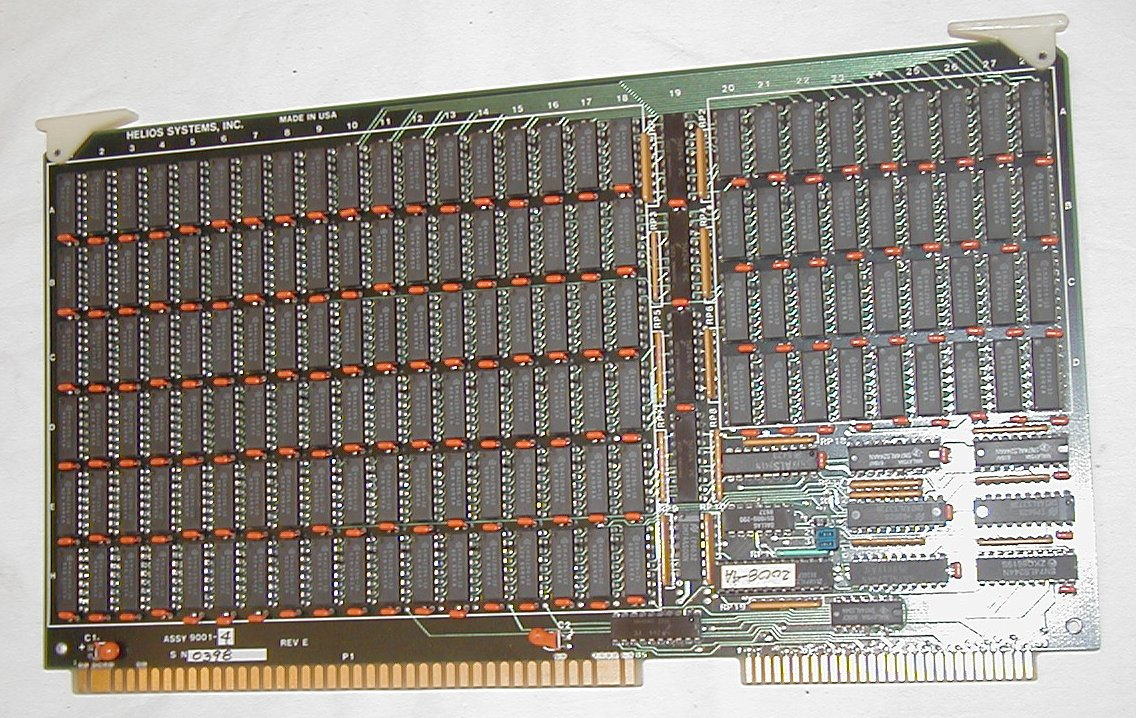
Helios Multibus 4 MB memory board

=== Sun 2 VMEbus systems ===
The Sun 2/50 (2 slot desktop), Sun 2/130 (12 slot monochrome deskside) and Sun 2/160 (12 slot color deskside) used quad-depth, triple height Eurocard VMEbus CPU boards. The VMEbus CPU board was based on the same design as the Multibus CPU but also included 2 MB or 4 MB of memory, the Sun-2 monochrome frame buffer, and 10 Mbit/s Thick Ethernet on board.

Sun provided 1 MB Multibus memory boards and 1 MB and 4 MB VMEbus memory boards but only supported configurations with a maximum of 4 MB RAM. Companies such as Helios Systems also made 4 MB memory boards that would work in Sun systems.

A common frame buffer was the Sun-2 Prime Monochrome Video. This board provided an 1152x900 monochrome display with TTL or ECL video signals, and keyboard and mouse ports. It normally occupied the top 1 MB of physical memory address space. There was also a Sun-2 Color Video board available that provided an 1152x900 8-bit color display. This board occupied the top 4 MB of address space.

42 MB MFM disks were commonly used for storage. Two disks could be connected to an Adaptec MFM/SCSI and then to a Sun-2 Multibus Serial/SCSI Host Adapter. The SCSI board provided two additional serial ports. For larger storage requirements, 65, 130, and 380 MB SMD disks were connected to a Xylogics 450 SMD Controller. The SMD controller could support four disks even though Sun only supported two. A 20 MB QIC tape drive could be connected through an Archive QIC/SCSI converter. The system also supported 1/2" tape drives connected to a Computer Products Corporation TAPEMASTER or a Xylogics 472 board.

An Ethernet connection was provided by a Sun board based on the Intel 82586 chip, or a 3Com 3c400 board. The server could support diskless Sun-2/50 clients through the Ethernet board.

Other supported Multibus boards included the Sky Computer Floating Point Processor, Sun ALM (Asynchronous Line Multiplexer) with 8 serial ports, and Sun SunLink Communications Processor (SCP) for SNA and X.25 connectivity.

Sun-2 VME circuit boards
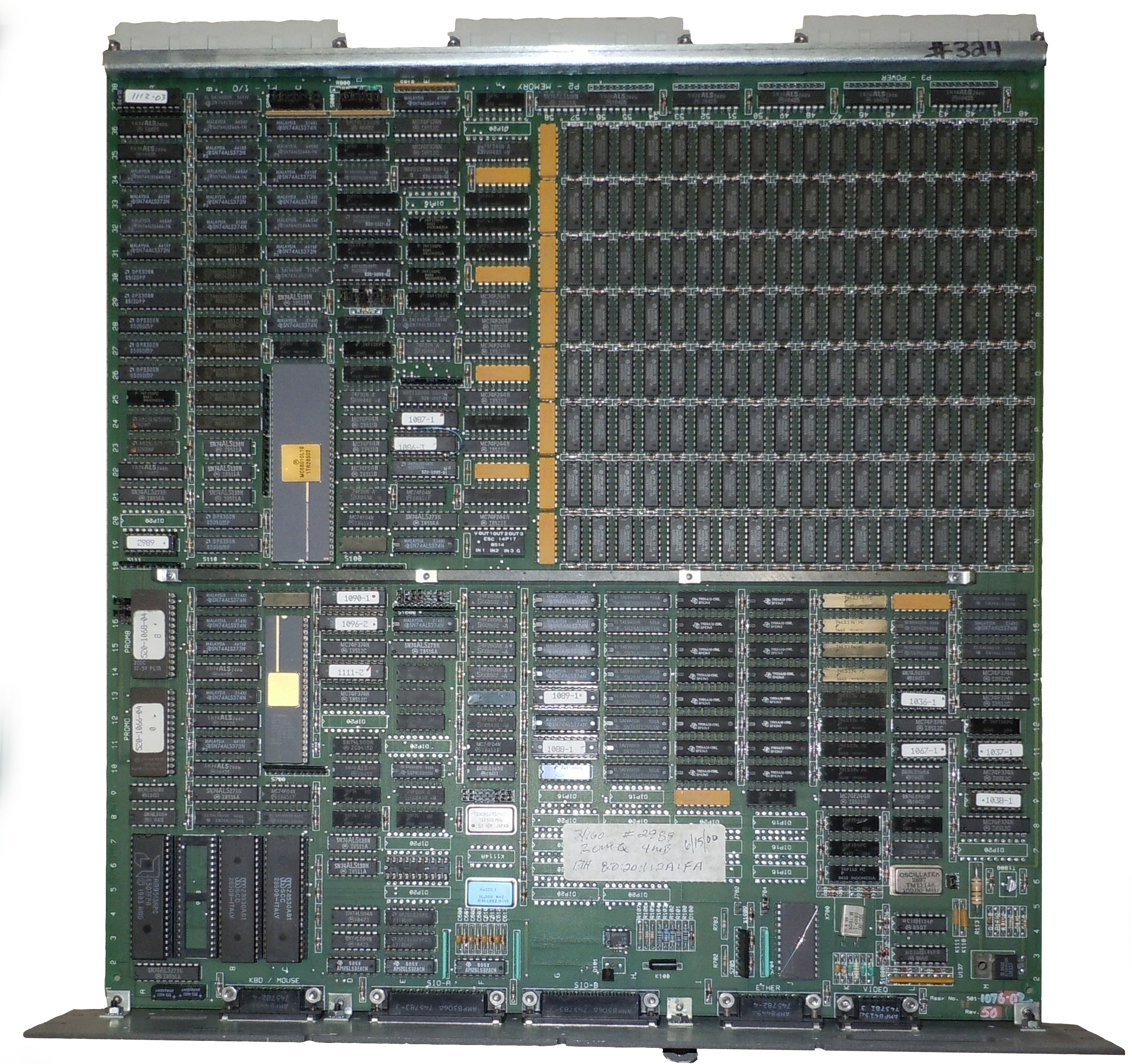
Sun-2 VME CPU board

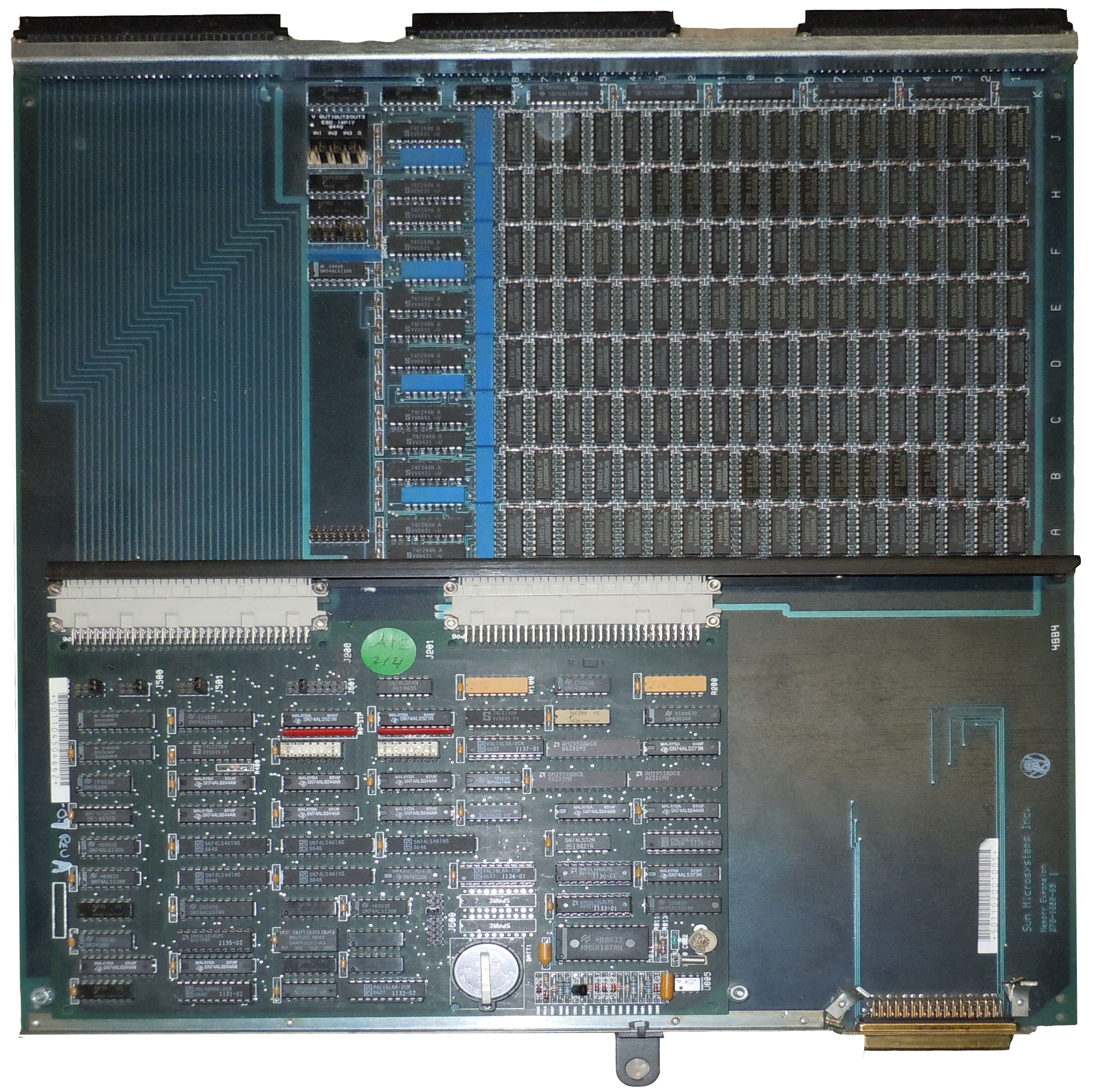
Sun-2 VME 1 MB Memory and SCSI board

== Reception ==
BYTE in August 1984 described the Sun-2/120 as a "VAX-class machine", with "superb graphics and excellent response time under loading".

== See also ==
- Sun-1
- Sun-3
- Sun386i
- Sun-4
- SPARCstation
- 3M computer
