= Onyx Systems =

Computer company (1979–1985)

Onyx Systems, Inc.
- Industry: Computer hardware; Computer software
- Founded: 1979; 47 years ago
- Defunct: 1985
- Fate: Acquired by Corvus Systems
- Headquarters: Cupertino, United States
- Key people: Bob Marsh, Kip Myers, Scott McNealy
- Products: C8000/C8001, C8002, C5002A, C8002A, Sundance I, Sundance II, Sundance-16

Onyx Systems, Inc. was a computer hardware and software company founded in Cupertino, California in 1979 by Bob Marsh and Kip Myers, former managers in Zilog's systems group. It was one of the earliest vendors of microprocessor-based Unix systems.

== Products ==
The company's first product, the C8000, was a Zilog Z80-based micro running the CP/M OS, with a hard disk, and a tape drive for backups. It included IBM terminal emulation and a COBOL compiler, with a Z8000-based CPU add-in board to follow.

Later known as the C8001, thus establishing the broader notion of the C8000 series of products, the Z80-based product could be equipped with up to four 64 KB RAM cards for a total of 256 KB. The machine was designed to be upgraded to the subsequent 16-bit model in the range, the C8002, by adding a Z8000 processor card to supplement the existing Z80 card, and for an additional 256 KB of RAM to be added on its own card. Onyx licensed Unix from Western Electric and quoted four-user and eight-user licences costing $1,500 and $2,500 respectively.

In 1980, Onyx introduced the C8002 based on the Z8000. Its price of US$20,000 (equivalent to $78,200 in 2025) was half the cost of any other computer capable of running Unix, and included Bell Labs' recent Version 7 Unix, this having been adapted for the Z8000 with a "rewritten nucleus and several new compilers", renamed ONIX, but otherwise being "exactly the same system" as the Western Electric product available for the DEC PDP-11 family. Instead of electing to use Zilog's own Z8001 product to offer a system with memory management, Onyx instead chose to use the Z8002 in conjunction with its own memory management hardware, thus avoiding the delays experienced by other manufacturers who had chosen to base their designs around the Z8001 and its accompanying memory management chip. Onyx's hardware implemented a 2 KB page size and allowed the system to access up to 1 MB of memory, although processes were limited to 64 KB - imposed by the limitations of the Z8002 itself - for each of their program and data sections. These limitations were less onerous that those imposed by various 16-bit minicomputers where the 64 KB limit applied to the combined size of the program and data sections, with the PDP-11/23 noted as an example.

Alongside the Z8002, the C8002 also provided an Am9512 floating-point unit. Mass storage was supported by a dedicated Z80A processor with 64 KB of its own RAM, this hosting the disk and tape control software along with a disk sector cache. Data transfers between the disk system and main memory were performed using direct memory access (DMA). Pricing in the United Kingdom started at around £12,000 (£46,300 adjusted for inflation) for a four-user system with 256 KB of RAM and 10 MB hard drive.

In late 1982, Onyx announced models running Unix System III in the form of the Sundance-16, C5002A and C8002A. Featuring the Z8001 processor running at 6 MHz and 256 KB of RAM, expandable to 512 KB, the Sundance-16 was fitted with a 7 MB, 14 MB or 21 MB hard drive and a tape drive. Two models of the Sundance-16 were offered with variation in the capabilities of the product's built-in display: the Model 80 supported 80-column text, whereas the Model 132 could be switched between 80-column and 132-column modes and permitted double-height and double-width characters. The C5002A and C8002A also featured the Z8001 but were focused on a terminal server role, with the former supporting up to five users and the latter up to eleven users, and both being expandable to 1 MB of RAM. The C5002A was offered with the 14 MB or 21 MB hard drive choices also offered for the Sundance-16, whereas the C8002A was supplied with a choice of larger hard drives: 20 MB or 40 MB. Additional drives could be connected: one for the C5002A and three for the C8002A. A 60 MB drive option for the C8002A was also referenced in publicity.

Similar upgrades to Onyx's Z80-based system were also introduced, with the Sundance II being announced in mid-1982 as a multi-user version of the base Sundance model, having 256 KB of RAM instead of the 64 KB of the single-user model. An upgrade between models could be performed. These Z80-based models were offered with a choice of CP/M, MP/M and the OASIS operating system.

== Legacy and fate ==
Codata Systems Corporation was established by former Onyx Systems employees in 1979, introducing a similar Z8000-based product to that of Onyx Systems, the CTS-200 running Xenix, before following up with a product based on the Motorola 68000, the CTS-300, running its own Unix variant, Unisis, developed in conjunction with UniSoft. Unisis was based on Version 7 Unix, and Codata claimed to have been "the first to offer a microcomputer-based Unix on the M68000" and to have supplied 500 systems by early 1983. Codata later released the Codata 3300 system employing an 8 MHz 68000 and having 320 KB of RAM, upgradeable to 1.5 MB, a 12 MB, 33 MB or 84 MB hard drive, and a floppy drive, priced at £8,900 for the entry-level model in the UK, $9,600 in the US. The system employed the IEEE 796 Multibus standard.

Marsh and Myers themselves went on to leave Onyx in 1980 to found Plexus Computers, another manufacturer of Unix systems, in Santa Clara, California.

Onyx's first Unix-based system was the first platform for the Informix relational database system.

Former Harvard economics professor William Raduchel recruited Scott McNealy to manage manufacturing at Onyx. McNealy left Onyx to become a co-founder of Sun Microsystems.

Onyx was acquired by Corvus Systems in 1985. Corvus discontinued US sales of the Onyx product lines in early 1986, having reportedly pledged to continue manufacturing for foreign markets, eventually selling off the rights to some of its product lines and, in 1987, exiting the microcomputer business altogether.
