= Disagree and commit =

Management principle

Disagree and commit is a management principle that individuals are allowed to disagree while a decision is being made, but that once a decision has been made, everybody must commit to implementing the decision. Disagree and commit is a method of avoiding the consensus trap, in which the lack of consensus leads to inaction.

== History ==
Scott McNealy used the phrase as early as some time between 1983 and 1991, as part of the line "Agree and commit, disagree and commit, or get out of the way".

The concept has also been attributed to Andrew Grove at Intel.

Amazon added "Have Backbone; Disagree and Commit" as one of its leadership principles some time in 2010–2011. Amazon CEO Jeff Bezos mentioned the term in his "2016 Letter to Shareholders".

Herb Sutter of the ISO C++ Committee referred to the principle as a "long-standing high-trust" practice within the committee, while discussing the failed Draft International Standard (DIS) ballot for C++26.

== Organizations that have used the principle ==
- Sun Microsystems
- Intel
- Amazon.com
- Netflix
- GitLab
- Chef Software
- Zalando
- Stripe

== See also ==
- Agree to disagree
- Democratic centralism
- Management science
- Management style
- Outline of business management
