= Stanford University Network =

First wide-area packet-switched network

The Stanford University Network, also known as SUN, SUNet or SU-Net is the campus computer network for Stanford University.

== History ==
Stanford Research Institute, formerly part of Stanford but on a separate campus, was the site of one of the four original ARPANET nodes. Later ARPANET nodes were located in the Stanford Artificial Intelligence Laboratory, the Computer Science Department, and the Stanford University Medical Center. In late 1979, the Xerox Palo Alto Research Center donated equipment including Xerox Alto computers, a laser printer, and file server connected by Ethernet local area network technology.

A router based on the PDP-11 computer from Digital Equipment Corporation with software from MIT was used to connect the Ethernet to the ARPANET. The PARC Universal Packet protocol was initially used on the local parts of the network, which was the experimental version of Ethernet with a data rate under 3 megabits/second. As the TCP/IP protocols evolved through the 1980s, a TCP/IP network was built on the main campus, extending to other departments, and connecting many other computers. This network was called the Stanford University Network or SUN. Today, the campus network is referred to as SUNet.

Andy Bechtolsheim, a Stanford graduate student at the time, designed a SUN workstation for use on the network in 1980. It was inspired by the Alto, but used a more modular design powered by a Motorola 68000 processor interfaced to other circuit boards using Multibus. The workstations were used by researchers to develop the V-System and other projects. Bechtolsheim licensed the design to become the basis of the products of Sun Microsystems (whose name was a pun based on the SUN acronym).

The CPU board could be configured with Bechtolsheim's experimental Ethernet boards, or commercial 10 megabit/second boards made by 3Com or others to act as a router. These routers were called Blue Boxes for the color of their case. The routers were developed and deployed by a group of students, faculty, and staff, including Len Bosack who was in charge of the computer science department's computers, and Sandy Lerner who was the Director of Computer Facilities for the Stanford University Graduate School of Business. All told there were about two dozen Blue Boxes scattered across campus. This original router design formed the base of the first Cisco Systems router hardware products, founded by Bosack and Lerner (who were married at the time).

The original router software was called NOS, Network Operating System, written by William Yeager, a staff research engineer at Stanford's medical school. Distinguishing features of NOS were that it was written in C and that it was multi-tasking capable; this allowed additional network interfaces and additional features to be easily added as new tasks. NOS was the basis of Cisco's IOS operating system. In 1987, Stanford licensed the router software and two computer boards to Cisco, after investigations by Stanford staff members such as Les Earnest.
