= Agree to disagree =

Tolerating but not accepting another's position

To "agree to disagree" is to resolve a conflict (usually a debate or quarrel) by having all parties tolerating but not accepting the opposing positions. It generally occurs when all sides recognize that further conflict would be unnecessary, ineffective or otherwise undesirable.

== Origin ==
In 1770, the phrase "agree to disagree" appeared in print in its modern meaning when, at the death of George Whitefield, John Wesley wrote a memorial sermon which acknowledged but downplayed the two men's doctrinal differences:

There are many doctrines of a less essential nature ... In these we may think and let think; we may 'agree to disagree.' But, meantime, let us hold fast the essentials...

In a subsequent letter to his brother Charles, Wesley attributed it to Whitefield (presumably George Whitefield): "If you agree with me, well: if not, we can, as Mr. Whitefield used to say, agree to disagree." Whitefield had used it in a letter as early as June 29, 1750.

After all, those who will live in peace must agree to disagree in many things with their fellow-labourers, and not let little things part or disunite them."

Though Whitefield and Wesley appear to have popularized the expression in its usual meaning, it had appeared in print much earlier (1608) in a work by James Anderton, writing under the name of John Brereley, Priest, although his usage lacks the implication of tolerance of differing beliefs.

And as our learned adversaries do thus agree to disagree in their owne translations, mutually condemning (as before) each other... (The Protestants Apologie for the Roman Church Deuided into three seuerall Tractes)

The phrase "agree to differ" appeared in the early part of the 18th century in a sermon by John Piggott: "And now why should we not agree to differ, without either enmity or scorn?" (Sermon on Union and Peace, preach'd to several Congregations, April 17, 1704).

== See also ==
- Disagree and commit
- I'm entitled to my opinion – a logical fallacy sometimes presented as "Let's agree to disagree"
- Aumann's agreement theorem – Theorem in game theory
