= William Yeager =

American engineer

William James Yeager
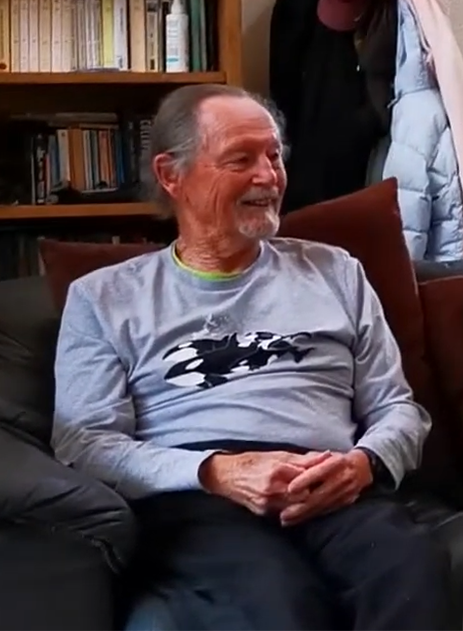
- Born: June 16, 1940 (age 85); San Francisco
- Education: Bachelor's degree in mathematics Master's degree in mathematics Doctoral course
- Alma mater: University of Washington; San Jose State University; University of California, Berkeley
- Occupations: American engineer software programmer
- Employer(s): Stanford University; NASA Ames Research Center; Sun Microsystems.
- Known for: IMAP protocol Inventor of packet switched devices and router Network OS programmer
- Notable work: Patents

William "Bill" Yeager (born June 16, 1940, in San Francisco) is an American engineer. He is an inventor of a packet-switched, "Ships in the Night", multiple-protocol router in 1981.

== Education ==
He received his bachelor's degree in mathematics from the University of California, Berkeley in 1964; his master's degree in mathematics from San Jose State University in 1966; and completed his doctoral course work at the University of Washington in 1970.

== Career ==
From 1970 to 1975 he worked at NASA Ames Research Center where he wrote, as a part of the Pioneer 10/Pioneer 11 mission control operating system, both the telemetry monitoring and real time display of the images of Jupiter.

He joined Stanford University in August 1975 as a member of Dr. Elliott Levanthal's Instrumentation Research Laboratory. He was responsible for a small computer laboratory for biomedical applications of mass spectrometry. This laboratory in conjunction with several chemists, and the Department of inherited rare diseases in the medical school made significant inroads in identifying inherited rare diseases from the gas chromatograph, mass spectrometer data generated from blood and urine samples of sick children. His significant accomplishment was to complete a prototype program initiated by Dr. R. Geoff Dromey called CLEANUP. This program "extracted representative spectra from GC/MS data," and was later used by the EPA to detect water pollutants.

At Stanford in 1979, Yeager wrote the ttyftp serial line file transfer program, which was developed into the Macintosh version of the Kermit protocol at Columbia University.

During his 20-year tenure at Stanford he worked in the Knowledge Systems Laboratory as well as the Stanford University Computer Science department. Yeager's 1981 Stanford router used his custom Network Operating System (NOS). The code routed PARC Universal Packet (PUP), Xerox Network Systems (XNS), Internet Protocol (IP) and Chaosnet packets. His NOS was also used in the EtherTIPS that were used throughout the Stanford LAN for terminal access to both the LAN and the Internet. This code was licensed by Cisco Systems in 1987 and became the core of the first Cisco IOS. This provided the groundwork for a new, global communications approach.

He is also known for his role in the creation of the Internet Message Access Protocol (IMAP) mail protocol. In 1984 he conceived of a client/server protocol, designed its functionality, applied for and received the grant money for its implementation. In 1985 Mark Crispin was hired to work with him on what became the IMAP protocol. Along with Mark, who implemented the protocols details and wrote the first client, MMD, Yeager wrote the first Unix IMAP server. Yeager later implemented MacMM which was the first Macintosh IMAP client. Frank Gilmurray assisted with the initial part of this implementation.

After his stint at Stanford he worked for 10 years at Sun Microsystems.

In the Summer of 1999 under the guidance of Greg Papadopoulos, Sun's CTO, and reporting directly to Carl Cargill, Sun's director of corporate standards, led Sun's WAP Forum team with the major objective, "... to work with the WAP Forum on the convergence of the WAP protocol suite with IETF, W3C and Java standards."

As the CTO of Project JXTA he filed 40 US Patents, and along with Rita Yu Chen, designed and implemented the JXTA security solutions. In 2002 he along with Jeff Altman, then a contributor to the JXTA Open Source community, initiated the effort to establish the Internet Research Task Force (IRTF) Peer-to-Peer working group. The working group was created in 2003. Yeager was the working group chair until 2005.

As Chief Scientist at Peerouette, Inc., he filed 2 US and 2 European Union Patents. He has 20 US Patents issued, 4 of which are on the SIMS High Performance Email Servers which he invented and with a small team of engineers implemented, and 16 on Peer-to-peer and distributed computing.

During 1999 he invented the iPlanet Wireless Services. The latter was a Java proxy between IMAP Mail servers and either WAP Servers, or Web Browers. It proxied the following markup languages: The Handheld Device Markup Language, HDML, the Wireless Markup Language, WML, as well as HTML. This was a one person project supported by SFR/Cegetel in France. The primary goal was to enable email service to WAP phones.

== Patents ==
- Personal Server and network - Patent Application for Peerouette P2P Technology
- Global community naming authority - Patent Application for Peerouette P2P Technology
- [US Patent 6,167,402 - High Performance Message Store]
- [US Patent 6,735,770 - Method and apparatus for high performance access to data in a message store]
- [US Patent 6,418,542 - Critical signal thread]
- [US Patent 6,457,064 - Method and apparatus for detecting input directed to a thread in a multi-threaded process]
- [US Patent 7,065,579 - System using peer discovery and peer membership protocols for accessing peer-to-peer platform resources on a network]
- [US Patent 7,127,613 - Secured peer-to-peer network data exchange]
- [US Patent 7,136,927 - Peer-to-peer resource resolution]
- [US Patent 7,167,920 - Peer-to-peer communication pipes]
- [US Patent 7,213,047 - Peer trust evaluation using mobile agents in peer-to-peer networks]
- [US Patent 7,203,753 - Propagating and updating trust relationships in distributed peer-to-peer networks]
- [US Patent 7,222,187 - Distributed trust mechanism for decentralized networks]
- [US Patent 7,254,608 - Managing Distribution of Content Using Mobile Agents in Peer-to-Peer Networks]
- [US Patent 7,275,102 - Trust Mechanisms for a Peer-to-Peer Network Computing Platform]
- [US Patent 7,290,280 - Method and apparatus to facilitate virtual transport layer security on a virtual network]
- [US Patent 7,308,496 - Representing Trust in Distributed Peer-to-Peer Networks]
- [US Patent 7,340,500 - Providing peer groups in a peer-to-peer environment]
- [US Patent 8,108,455 - Mobile Agents in Peer-to-Peer networks]
- [US Patent 8,160,077 - Peer-to-Peer communication pipes]
- [US Patent 8,176,189 - Peer-to-Peer network computing platform]
- [US Patent 8,359,397 - Reliable peer-to-peer connections]
