= Les Earnest =

American computer scientist (1930–2024)

- Born: Lester Donald Earnest; December 17, 1930
- Died: August 27, 2024 (aged 93)
- Occupation: Computer scientist

Academic background
- Education: Caltech (B.S.); MIT (M.S.)

Lester Donald Earnest (December 17, 1930 – August 27, 2024) was an American computer scientist.

== Life and career ==
After receiving his B.S. in electrical engineering from the California Institute of Technology (Caltech) in 1953, he began his career as a computer programmer in 1954 during a stint as a U.S. Navy Aviation Electronics Officer & Digital Computer Project Officer at the Naval Air Development Center (NADC) in Johnsville, Pennsylvania. In 1956, he joined the Massachusetts Institute of Technology (MIT)'s Lincoln Laboratory to help design the Semi-Automatic Ground Environment (SAGE) air defense system.

In 1959, the focus of his career shifted to innovations within the field of word processing. During this time, he was responsible for developing the "first pen-based computer system that reliably recognized cursive writing" and the first spell checker. From 1959 to 1965, he was a subdepartment head at the MITRE Corporation in Bedford, Massachusetts and Arlington, Virginia. While at MITRE, he received an M.S. in electrical engineering from MIT in 1960.

In 1965, Earnest became a lecturer in computer science at Stanford University and the chief administrative officer of the Stanford Artificial Intelligence Laboratory (SAIL). Under founding director John McCarthy, he became involved with the Advanced Research Projects Agency Network (ARPAnet) startup committee. This association would lead him to the one innovation he has received the most acclaim for: the invention of the Finger protocol (RFC 742) in the early 1970s. In the late 1960s, Earnest continued to diversify the types of technologies he involved himself with. He made significant contributions in the fields of robotics through the creation of systems that coupled computer vision with prosthetic and vehicular applications.

Following SAIL's merger with the University's computer science department in 1980, Earnest left Stanford to serve as the founding president and director of Imagen Corp. in Santa Clara, California. He returned to Stanford's computer science department in 1985 as a lecturer and associate department chair before retiring as senior research computer scientist emeritus in 1988.

Accomplishments in computing aside, Earnest was also a long-time bicycle enthusiast. He has served as director and/or officer in several prominent cycling associations including the U.S. Cycling Federation, the U.S. Bicycling Hall of Fame, and the Federation of Independent Associations for Cycling.

Earnest died on August 27, 2024, at the age of 93.
