= Multibus =

Computer bus standard

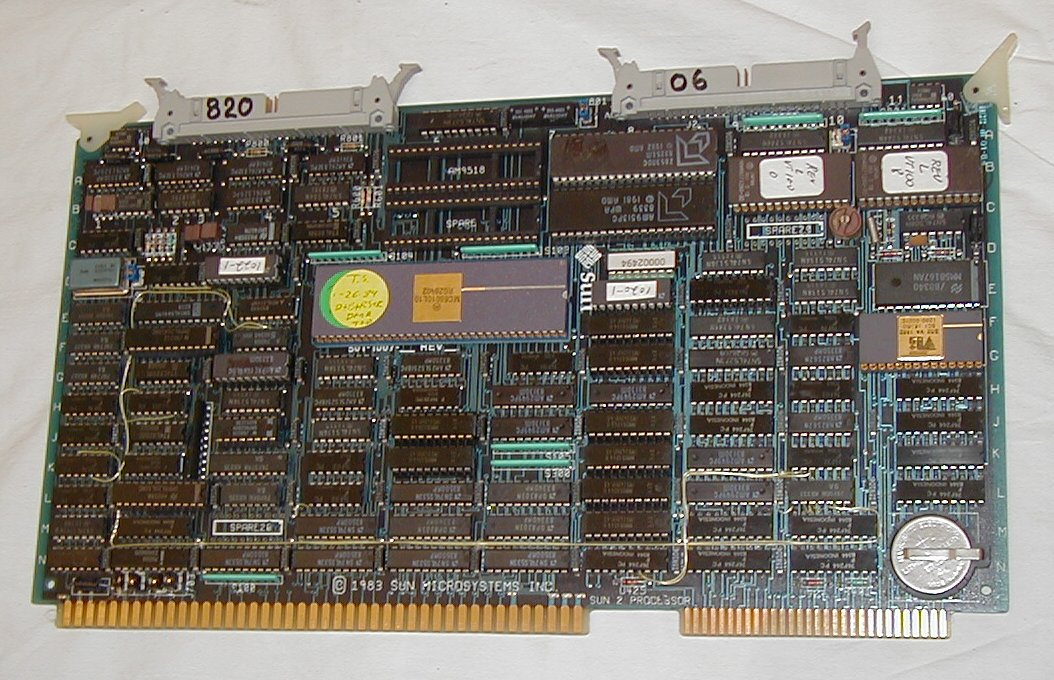
Multibus I CPU card from a Sun-2 workstation

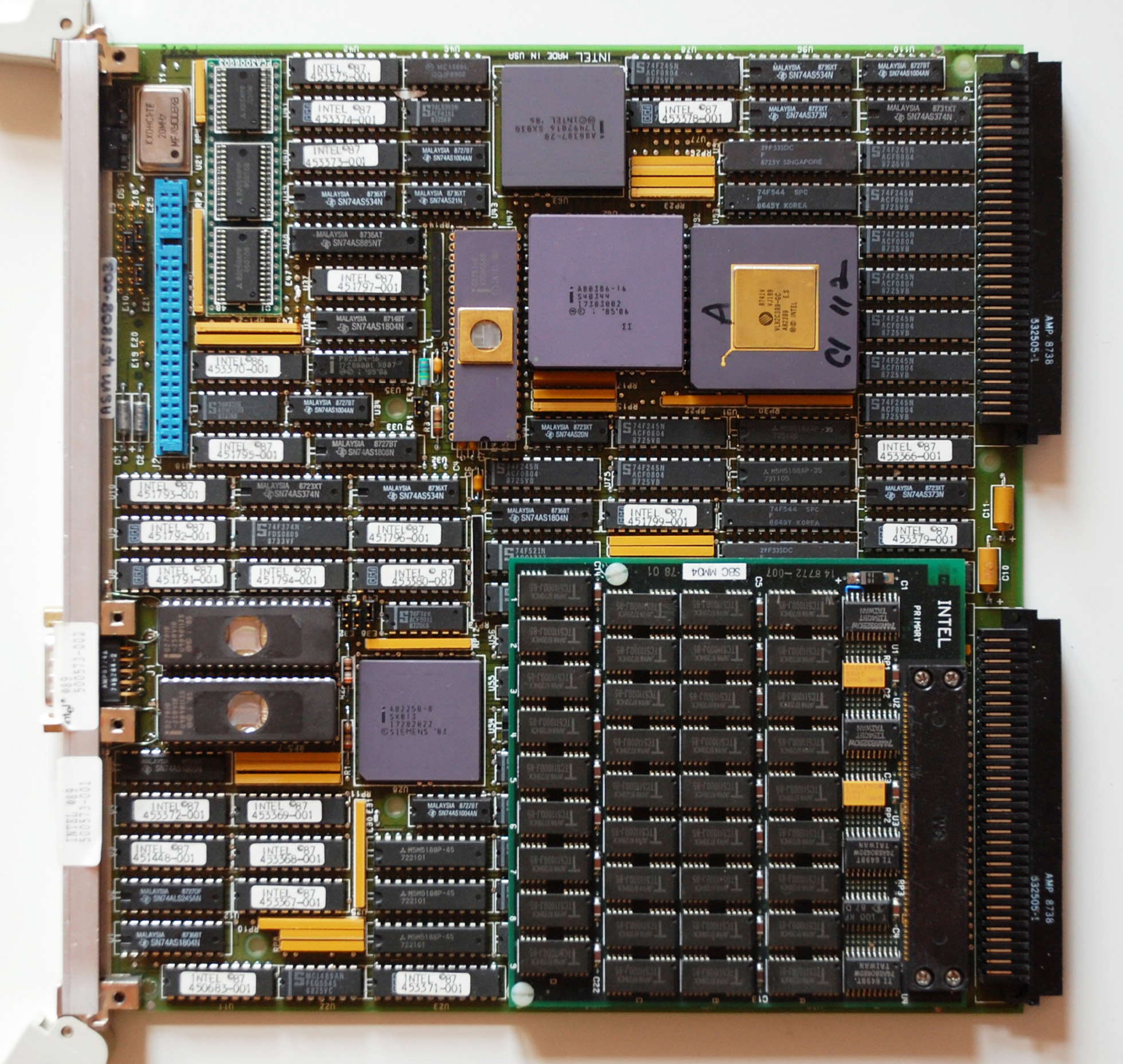
Intel iSBC 386/116 Multibus II Single Board Computer with VLSI A82389 as Multibus Controller

Multibus is a computer bus standard used in industrial systems. It was developed by Intel Corporation and was adopted as the IEEE 796 bus.

The Multibus specification was a robust industry standard with a relatively large form factor, allowing complex devices to be designed on it. Because it was well-defined and well-documented, a Multibus-compatible industry grew around it, with many companies making card cages and enclosures for it. Many others made CPU, memory, and other peripheral boards. In 1982, there were over 100 Multibus board and systems manufacturers. This allowed complex systems to be built from commercial off-the-shelf hardware, and also allowed companies to innovate by designing a proprietary Multibus board, then integrate it with another vendor's hardware to create a complete system.

One example of this was Sun Microsystems with their Sun-1 and Sun-2 workstations. Sun built custom-designed CPU, memory, SCSI, and video display boards, and then added 3Com Ethernet networking boards, Xylogics SMD disk controllers, Ciprico Tapemaster 1/2 inch tape controllers, Sky Floating Point Processor, and Systech 16-port Terminal Interfaces in order to configure the system as a workstation or a file server. Other workstation vendors who used Multibus-based designs included HP/Apollo and Silicon Graphics.

The Intel Multibus I & II product line was purchased from Intel by RadiSys Corporation, which in 2002 was then purchased by U.S. Technologies, Inc.

== Multibus architecture ==
Multibus was an asynchronous bus that accommodated devices with various transfer rates while maintaining a maximum throughput. It had 20 address lines so it could address up to 1 Mb of Multibus memory and 1 Mb of I/O locations. Most Multibus I/O devices only decoded the first 64 Kb of address space.

Multibus supported multi-master functionality that allowed it to share the Multibus with multiple processors and other DMA devices.

The standard Multibus form factor was a 12-inch-wide (300 mm), 6.75-inch-deep (171 mm) circuit board with two ejection levers on the front edge. The board had two buses: a wider P1 bus with pin assignment defined by the Multibus specification and a second smaller P2 bus was also defined as a private bus.

== Multibus standards ==
Multibus includes the following buses:

- Multibus System Bus — adopted as IEEE 796
- iSBX (I/O Expansion Bus) — adopted as IEEE P959
- iLBX Local Bus Extension (Execution Bus)
- Multichannel I/O Bus

== Versions ==
=== Multibus I ===
IEEE-796: Microcomputer System Bus; First released by Intel in 1974. The cards did not use front panels, instead using card edge fingers as the connectors (similar to ISA/PC-AT cards). Companies like Northwest Technical still provide "End of Life" products for Multibus I, which is now considered obsolete. The following are a list sections relevant to Multibus from the IEC 796 standard:

- IEC 796-1:1990 Microprocessor system bus—8-bit and 16-bit data (Multibus I) — Part 1: Functional description with electrical and timing specifications
- IEC 796-2:1990 Microprocessor system bus—8-bit and 16-bit data (Multibus I) — Part 2: Mechanical and pin descriptions for the system bus configuration, with edge connectors (direct)
- IEC 796-3:1990 Microprocessor system BUS I, 8-bit and 16-bit data (Multibus I) — Part 3: Mechanical and pin descriptions for the Eurocard configuration with pin and socket (indirect) connectors

=== Multibus II ===
IEEE-1296 32-bit/10 MHz bus, at 40 Mbyte/s. Card sizes are 3U x 220 mm, and 6U x 220 mm. These cards are larger than the VME Eurocard sizes, which are 3U/6U x 160mm. It uses TTL ("Fast" series) gates for drivers and the Backplane Connectors are DIN 41612 type C. Multibus II is not yet considered obsolete, but considered mature; however it is not recommended for new designs. IEEE-STD-1296: High-performance synchronous 32-bit bus: Multibus II, released in 1987, and 1994. Also as ISO/IEC 10861.

- ISO/IEC 10861:1994 Information technology—Microprocessor systems—High-performance synchronous 32-bit bus: Multibus II

== Historical uses ==
Multibus-II hardware running the iRMX operating system is used in the majority of the core Automatic Train Supervision subsystems on CLSCS, the London Underground Central line Signals Control System. This was supplied by Westinghouse Rail Systems and commissioned from the mid-1990s. The Central line is an Automatic Train Operation line. The Automatic Train Supervision elements use a mixture of iRMX on Multibus, and Solaris on SPARC computers. Sixteen Multibus-based Local Site Computers are distributed along the line together with six central Multibus-based subsystems in the control centre. Real time control and communications functions are provided by the Multibus-based processors and Sun workstations provide database functions and the operator consoles in the control room. All subsystem computers are dual redundant. The safety-critical Automatic Train Protection component is provided by trackside and trainborne equipment that does not use Multibus. The system was still in full operation as of 2011. In the control centre, Westinghouse also provided a cut-down mimic of the system for staff training and software test purposes using much of the same hardware and software as the full ATS system, but connected to a computer (also Multibus-II and Sun based) to simulate train movements and signaling behavior.

Oslo Metro or Oslo Tunnelbane uses a similar (although less complex) Westinghouse-supplied Multibus hardware control system through the central Common Tunnel or Fellestunnelen tracks, but was expected to be decommissioned in 2011.

== See also ==
- S-100 bus
- VMEbus
