= Alan George =

Alan George may refer to:

- J. Alan George (born 1943), computer scientist and university administrator at the University of Waterloo
- Alan Dale George, computer scientist at the University of Florida
