= Gaston Gonnet =

Computer Scientist, Entrepreneur

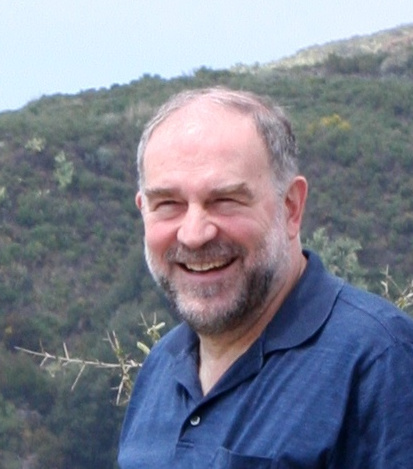
- Gaston Gonnet in 2006.
- Born: Gaston Henry Gonnet Haas; September 22, 1948 (age 78); Montevideo, Uruguay
- Education: University of Waterloo
- Known for: Maple Computer Algebra; OpenText
- Scientific career
- Fields: Bioinformatics; Scientific computation Computer algebra Machine learning
- Workplaces: University of Waterloo, ETH Zurich
- Doctoral advisor: J. Alan George
- Doctoral students: Ricardo Baeza-Yates; Christophe Dessimoz
- Website: www.inf.ethz.ch/personal/gonnet

Gaston H. Gonnet (born September 22, 1948) is a Uruguayan Canadian and Swiss computer scientist and entrepreneur. He is best known for his contributions to the Maple computer algebra system and the creation of a digital version of the Oxford English Dictionary.

== Education and early life ==
Gonnet received his doctorate in computer science from the University of Waterloo in 1977. His thesis was entitled Interpolation and Interpolation-Hash Searching. His advisor was J. Alan George.

== Career and research ==
In 1980 Gonnet co-founded the Symbolic Computation Group at the University of Waterloo. The work of SCG on a general-purpose computer algebra system later formed the core of the Maple system. In 1988, Gonnet co-founded (with Keith Geddes) the private company Waterloo Maple Inc., to sell Maple commercially. In the mid-1990s the company ran into trouble and a disagreement between his colleagues caused him to withdraw from chairing of the board and managerial involvement.

In 1984 Gonnet co-founded the New Oxford English Dictionary project at the University of Waterloo, which sought to create a searchable electronic version of the Oxford English Dictionary. The project was selected by the Oxford University Press as a partner for the computerisation leading to the publication of the second edition of the OED. The University of Waterloo project's main contributions were in the parsing of the source text to enhance the tagging and on building a full text searching system based on PAT trees (a version of suffix array). This project later culminated in another successful commercial venture, the Open Text Corporation. Gonnet was founder and chairman of the Board of OTC until 1994.

Gonnet is a computer science professor at ETH Zurich in Zurich, Switzerland. In 1991, he began developing the Darwin programming language for biosciences, which would become the basis for OMA, a package and database for gene orthology prediction. He was previously involved with two Canadian startups: CeeqIT and Porfiau and since 2018 has served as the Chief Scientist of Polyalgorithm Machine Learning, Inc.

=== Awards and honours ===
On June 9, 2011, Gonnet and Keith O. Geddes received the ACM Richard D. Jenks Memorial Prize for Excellence in Software Engineering Applied to Computer Algebra for the Maple Project.

On March 14, 2013, Gonnet was awarded a Dr. Honoris Causa by the Universidad de la República, engineering faculty from Uruguay.

== See also ==
- List of University of Waterloo people
