= Keith Geddes =

Canadian mathematician (born 1947)

Keith Oliver Geddes (born 1947) is a professor emeritus in the David R. Cheriton School of Computer Science within the Faculty of Mathematics at the University of Waterloo in Waterloo, Ontario. He is a former director of the Symbolic Computation Group in the School of Computer Science. He received a BA in Mathematics at the University of Saskatchewan in 1968; he completed both his MSc and PhD in Computer Science at the University of Toronto.

Geddes is probably best known for co-founding the Maple computer algebra system, now in widespread academic use around the world. He is also the Scientific Director at the Ontario Research Centre for Computer Algebra, and is a member of the Association for Computing Machinery, as well as the American and Canadian Mathematical Societies.

== Research ==
Geddes' primary research interest is to develop algorithms for the mechanization of mathematics. More specifically, he is interested in the computational aspects of algebra and analysis. Currently, he is focusing on designing hybrid symbolic-numeric algorithms to perform definite integration and solve ordinary and partial differential equations.

Much of his work currently revolves around Maple.

== Teaching ==
Geddes retired from teaching in December 2008. Geddes taught a mixture of both senior-level symbolic computation courses, at both the undergraduate and graduate level, as well as introductory courses on the principles of computer science.

== See also ==
- Maple computer algebra system
- Waterloo Maple
- Gaston Gonnet — the co-founder of Waterloo Maple
- Risch algorithm
- Symbolic integration
- Derivatives of the incomplete gamma function
- List of University of Waterloo people
