= Darwin (programming language) =

Multi-paradigm programming language

- Paradigm: Multi-paradigm: Imperative, structured, object-oriented
- Designed by: Gaston Gonnet
- First appeared: 1991; 35 years ago
- Typing discipline: Dynamic, strong
- Filename extensions: .drw

Influenced by
- Maple

Darwin is a closed-source programming language developed by Gaston Gonnet and colleagues at ETH Zurich in 1991. It is used to develop the OMA orthology inference software, which was also initially developed by Gonnet.

The language backend consists of the kernel, responsible for performing simple mathematical calculations, for transporting and storing data and for interpreting the user's commands, and the library, a set of programs which can perform more complicated calculations.

The target audience for the language is the biosciences, so the library consisted of routines such as those to compute pairwise alignments, phylogenetic trees, multiple sequence alignments, and to make secondary structure predictions.

== History ==
The Darwin programming language was created 1991 by Gaston Gonnet and his team at ETH Zurich to fill the growing needs of the bioinformatics field. At the time, genome sequencing was becoming a popular field, and researchers lacked high-level tools. Darwin was designed with this issue in mind. Over the next decade, Darwin remained relatively small due to its proprietary nature and narrow ecosystem.

== Example ==
One would write the Hello World program as:

printf('Hello, world!\n');

The following procedure calculates the factorial of a number:

factorial := proc ( n )
  if (n=0) then
    return(1);
  else
    return(n * factorial(n-1));
  fi;
end:
