= Regional Municipality of Waterloo =

Waterloo Region
- Upper-tier regional municipality
- Regional Municipality of Waterloo
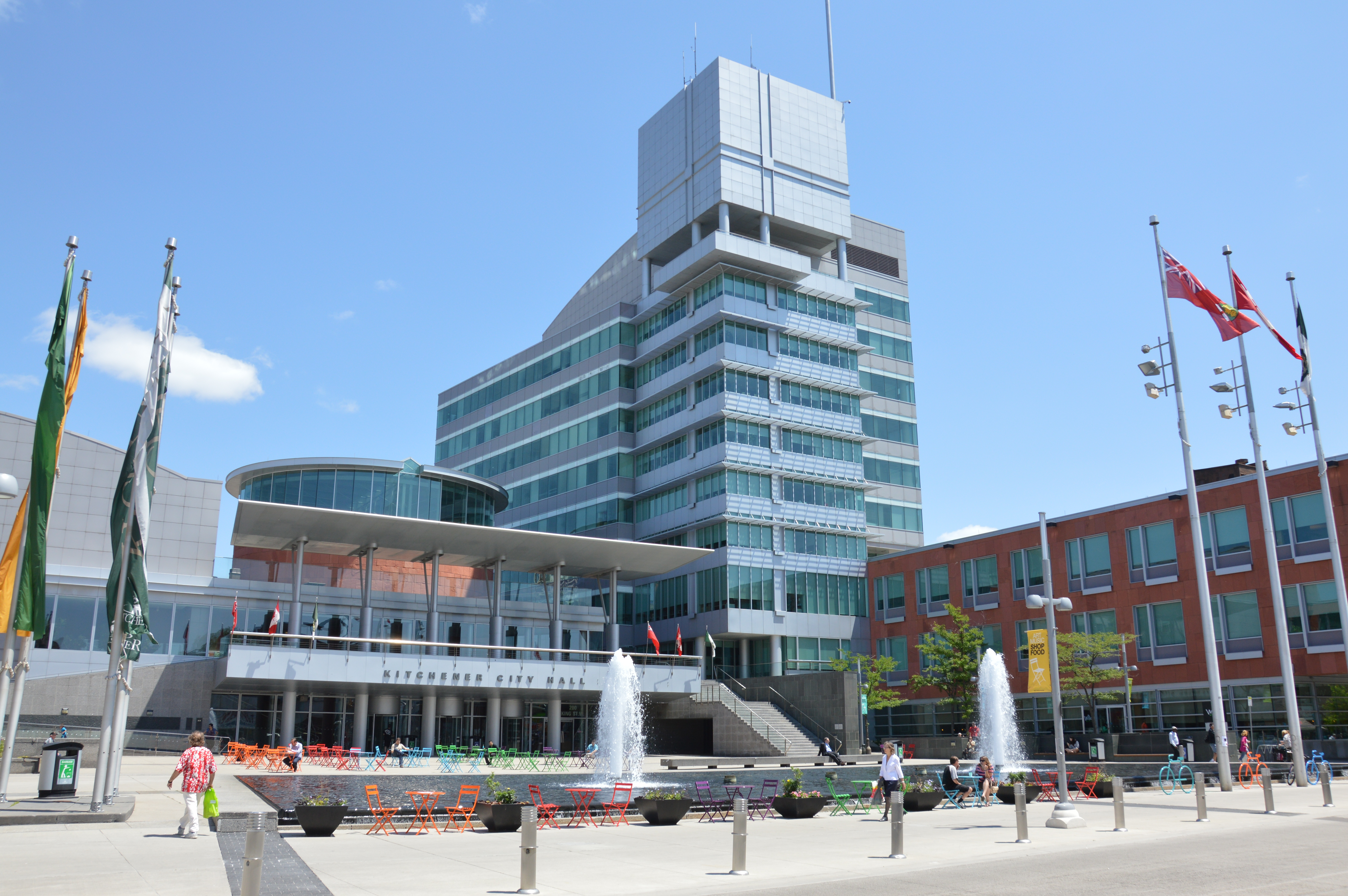
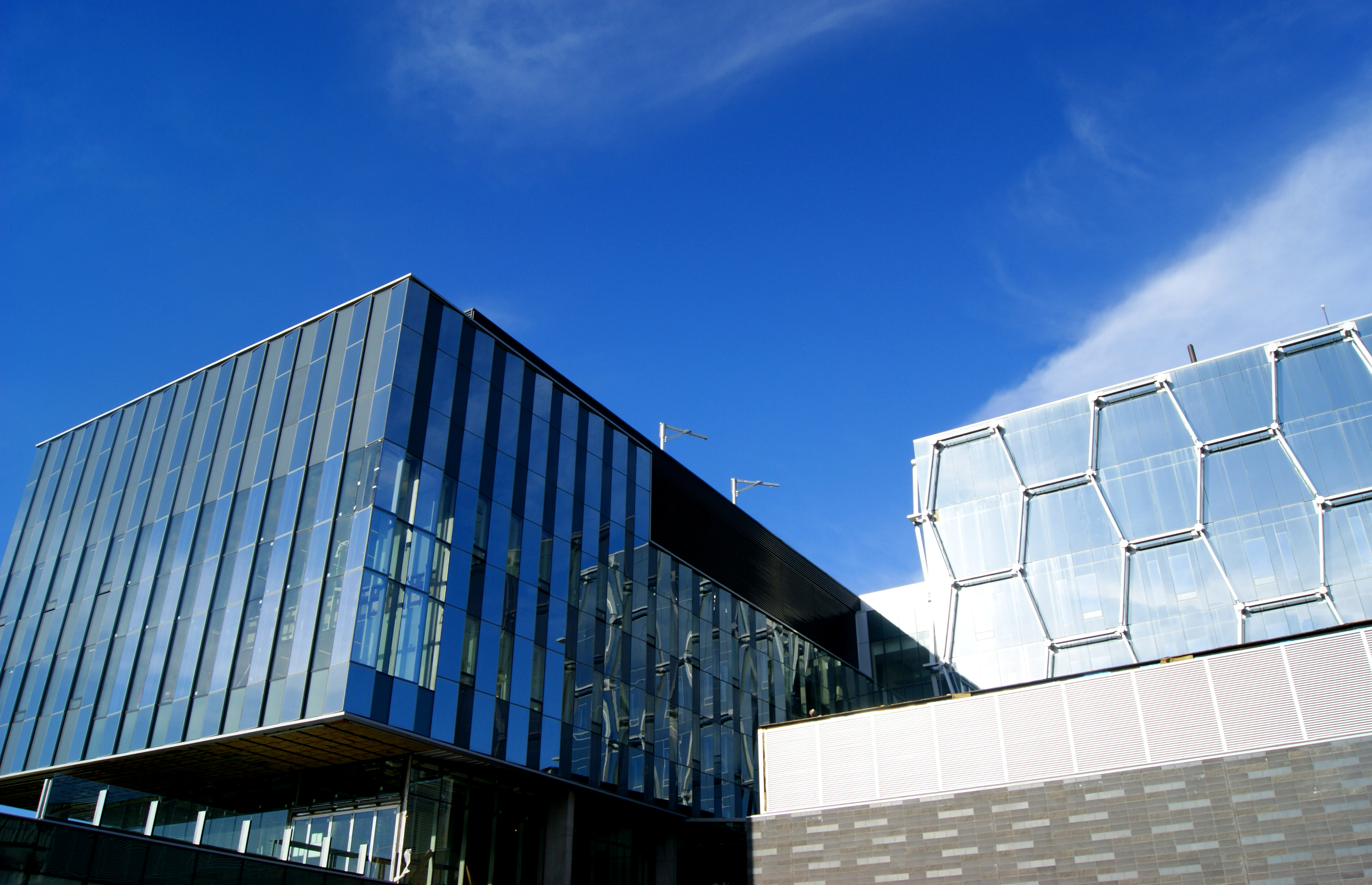
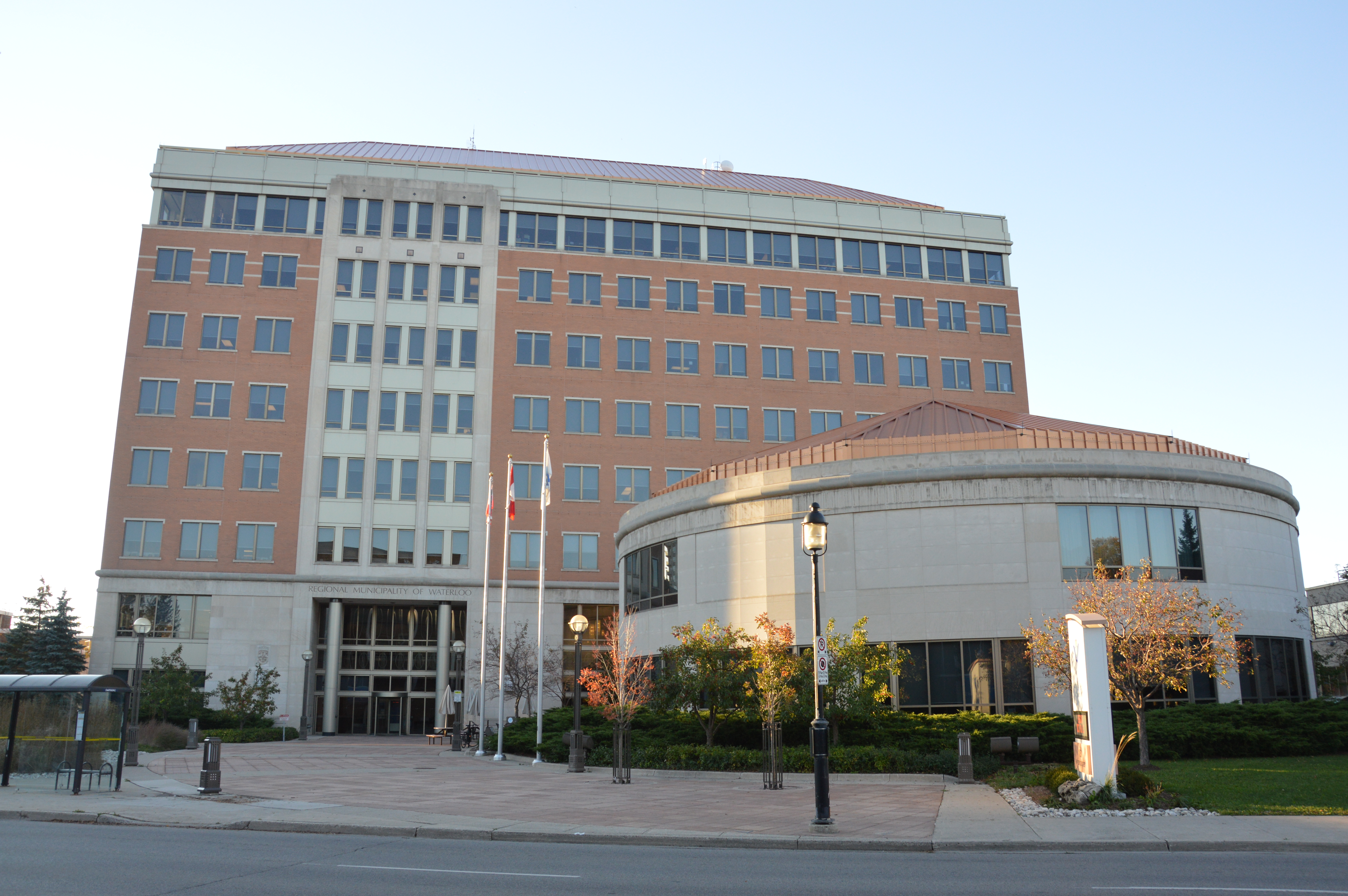
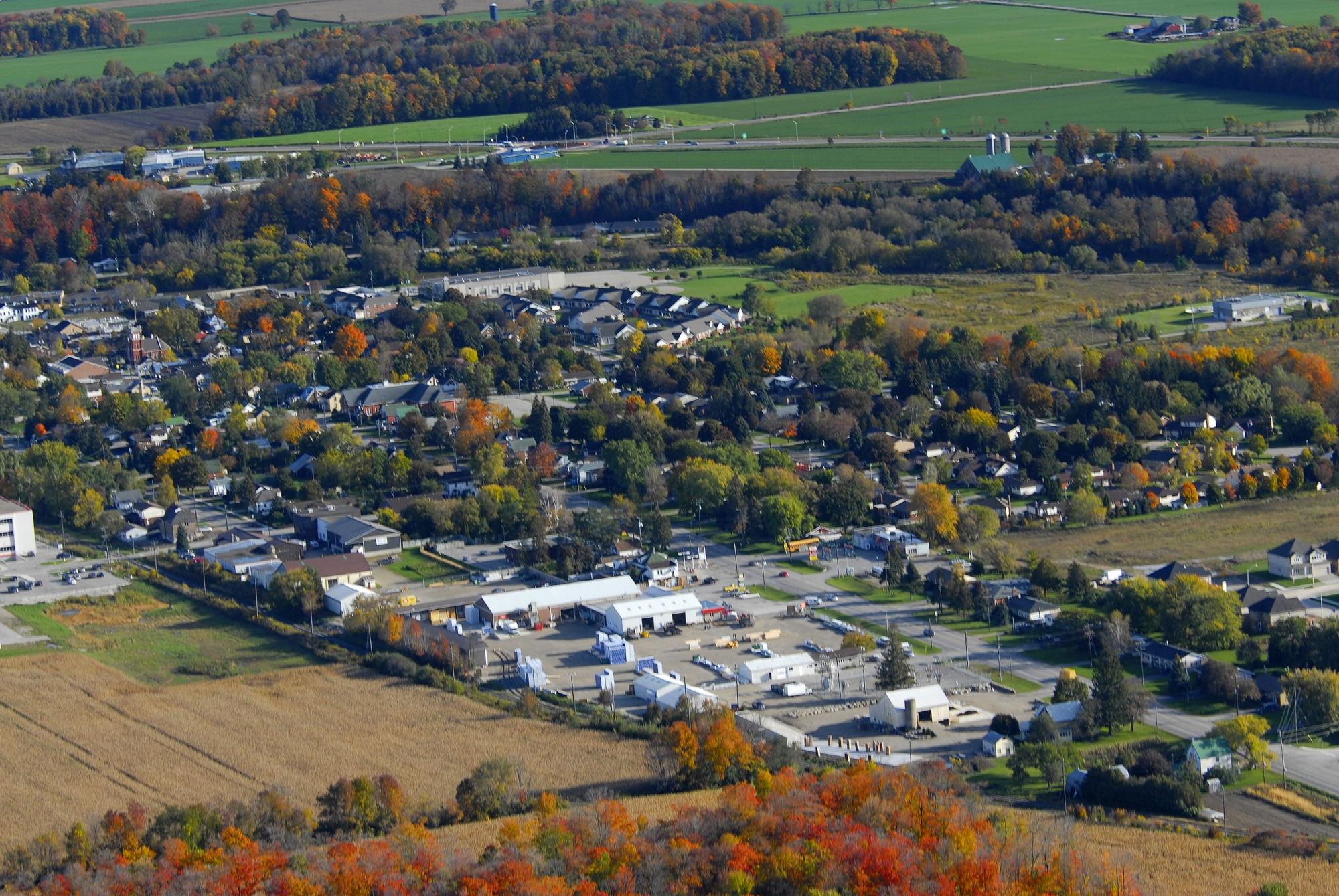
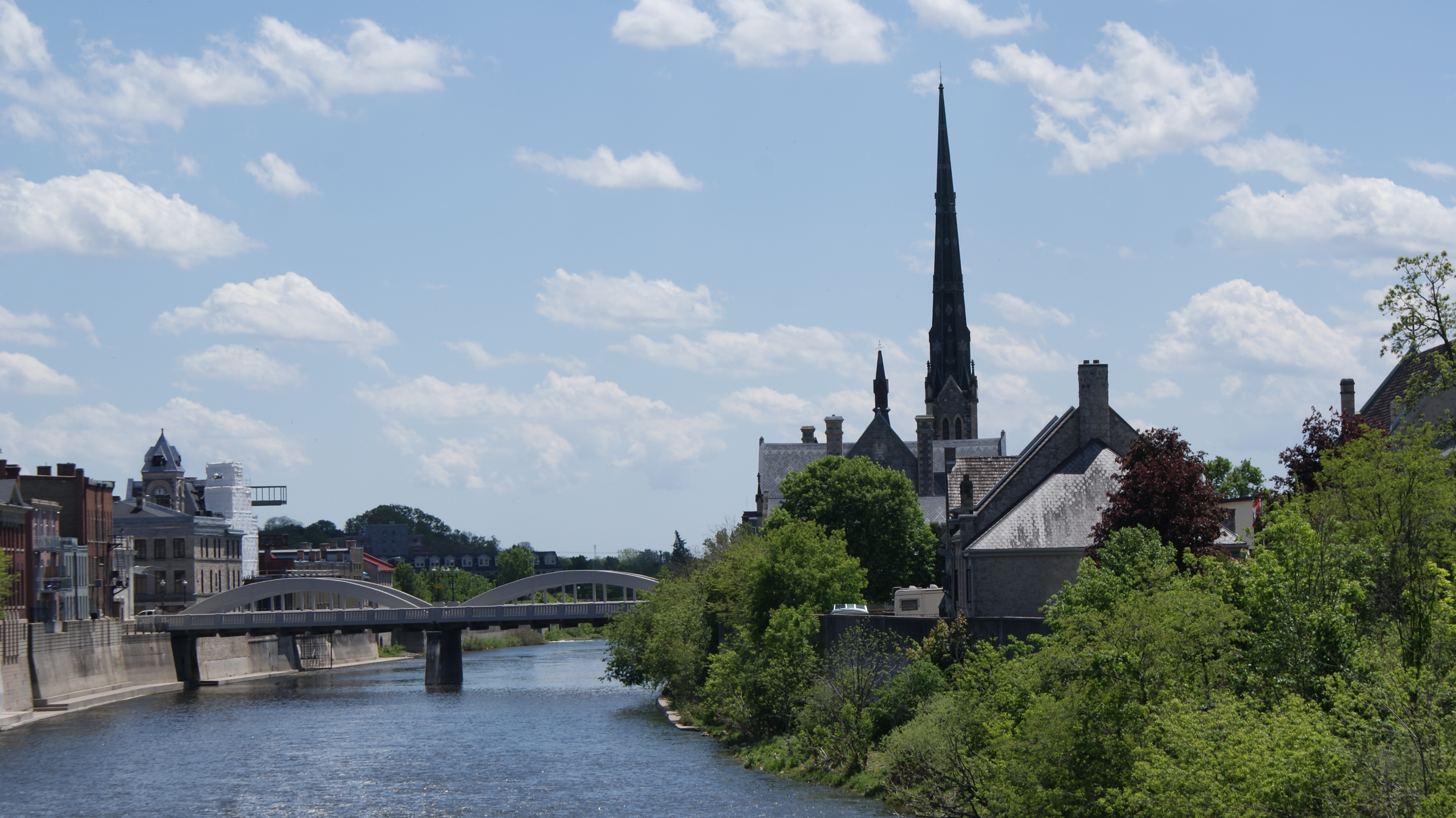
- Clockwise: Kitchener City Hall, Waterloo Regional Headquarters, Grand River scene in Cambridge, aerial view of St. Jacobs, University of Waterloo Nano Centre

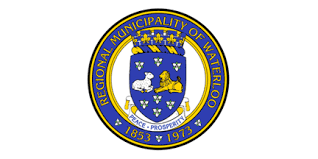
- Flag Logo
- Motto: "Peace, Prosperity!"
- Regional Municipality of Waterloo (Regional Municipality of Waterloo)

- Location of Waterloo Region in Ontario
- Coordinates: 43°29′35″N 80°30′04″W
- Country: Canada
- Province: Ontario
- Seat: Kitchener

Government
  - Regional Chair: Karen Redman
  - Governing Body: Waterloo Regional Council
  - MPs: List of MPs: Connie Cody (CPC); Kelly DeRidder (CPC); Tim Louis (LPC); Matt Strauss (CPC); Bardish Chagger (LPC)
  - MPPs: List of MPPs: Mike Harris Jr. (PC); Brian Riddell (PC); Aislinn Clancy (GPO); Catherine Fife (NDP); Jess Dixon (PC)

Area
  - Land: 1,370.07 km^{2} (528.99 sq mi)

Population (2021)
  - Total: 587,165
  - Density: 428.6/km^{2} (1,110/sq mi)

GDP
  - Tri-Cities CMA: CA$37.1 billion (2021)
- Time zone: UTC−5 (EST)
  - Summer (DST): UTC−4 (EDT)
- Area codes: 519, 226, 548
- Website: www.regionofwaterloo.ca

The Regional Municipality of Waterloo (Waterloo Region or Region of Waterloo) is a metropolitan area of Southern Ontario, Canada. It contains the cities of Cambridge, Kitchener and Waterloo (KWC or Tri-Cities), and the townships of North Dumfries, Wellesley, Wilmot and Woolwich. Kitchener, the largest city, is the seat of government.

The region is 1,370 square kilometres (530 sq mi) in area, with a population of 587,165 as of the 2021 Canada census, though an end of 2023 estimate puts the population above 673,910 people. Waterloo Region forms the tenth-largest metropolitan area in Canada, with recent population growth almost entirely fuelled by international students.

The region was formerly called Waterloo County, created in 1853 and dissolved in 1973. The county consisted of five townships: North Dumfries, Waterloo, Wellesley, Wilmot, and Woolwich.

== History ==
Early Archaic hunters of the Bifurcate Base tradition were present in the area around 8300 years ago. They occupied the Kassel site (AiHd-71), a base camp, and the Blue Dart site (AiHd-89), which was likely a kill site; this followed typical hunter-gatherer occupation patterns.

Up to the 17th century, the Attawandaron (Neutral) nation inhabited the Grand River area. European explorers admired their farming practices.

In the wake of a smallpox epidemic and European incursions, the Haudenosaunee (Iroquois) and the Wendat (Huron) Confederacies waged war from 1642 to 1650. Invasion by the Haudenosaunee's Seneca and Mohawk nations ended Attawandaron independence.

In 1784, in recognition of Haudenosaunee support during the American War of Independence and the consequent loss of its land in New York state, the British government granted the Grand River valley to the Confederacy. The latter settled in the lower Grand River Valley, the present Brant County, and sold land in the upper Grand, now part of Waterloo Township, to Loyalist Colonel Richard Beasley. In 1816, William Dickson, a Scottish-born land speculator, acquired 90,000 acres (360 km^{2}) along the Grand River, in present North and South Dumfries Townships, and the city of Cambridge.

=== North and South Dumfries Townships ===
Dickson planned to divide the tract into lots to sell to Scottish settlers. He and American-born miller, Absalom Shade, chose the confluence of Mill Creek and the Grand River to found Shade's Mills. In 1825, the growing settlement had a post office.

Despite settlers' reluctance, Dickson renamed the settlement Galt in honour of John Galt, a Scottish novelist and Canada Company Commissioner. Galt's visit in 1827 brought wider acceptance to the name change.

Initially serving local farmers, Galt's industrial development in the late 1830s eventually earned it the nickname "The Manchester of Canada". It remained the area's main town until Berlin overtook it at the beginning of the 20th century.

=== Kitchener-Waterloo ===
==== Pre-modern era ====
According to the City of Waterloo, indigenous people lived in the area, including the Haudenosaunee, Anishinaabe and the Neutral Nation.

One report states that at least two "aboriginal settlements from the 1500s can now be identified near Schneider and Strasburg Creeks" in Kitchener. The finds include the remains of a First Nations village, estimated to be 500 years old, discovered in 2010 in the Strasburg Creek area with "artifacts going back as far as 9,000 years". In 2020, a site at Fischer-Hallman Road was found to include artifacts from a "Late Woodland Iroquois village" that was inhabited circa 1300 to 1600. Archeologists found some 35,000 objects including stone tools and a 4,000 year old arrowhead.

==== 1800 to 1820 ====
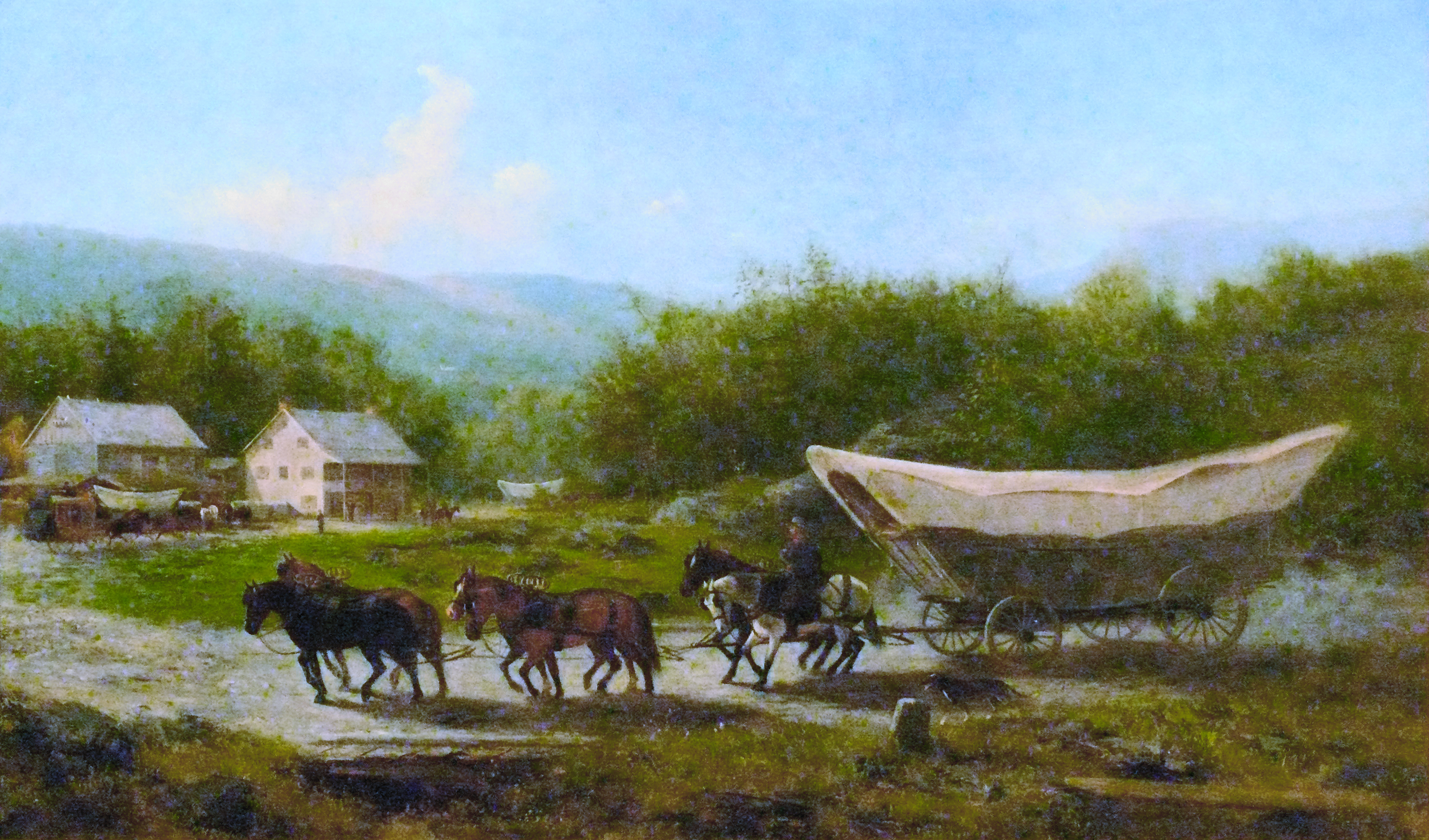
Many of the Mennonite Germans from Pennsylvania arrived in Conestoga wagons.

Settlement of the later Waterloo Township started in 1800 (in an area that is now Kitchener) by Joseph Schoerg (later called Sherk) and Samuel Betzner Jr. (brothers-in-law), Mennonites, from Franklin County, Pennsylvania. Joseph Schoerg and his wife settled on Lot No.11, B.F. Beasley Block, S.R., on the bank of the Grand River opposite Doon, and Betzner and his wife settled on the west bank of the Grand River, on a farm near an area that is now the village of Blair.

As of March 2021, the homes built by these families' next generation still stand on Pioneer Tower Road, Kitchener. Built circa 1830, they are listed as historically important: the John Betzner homestead (restored) and the David Schoerg farmstead (not yet restored).

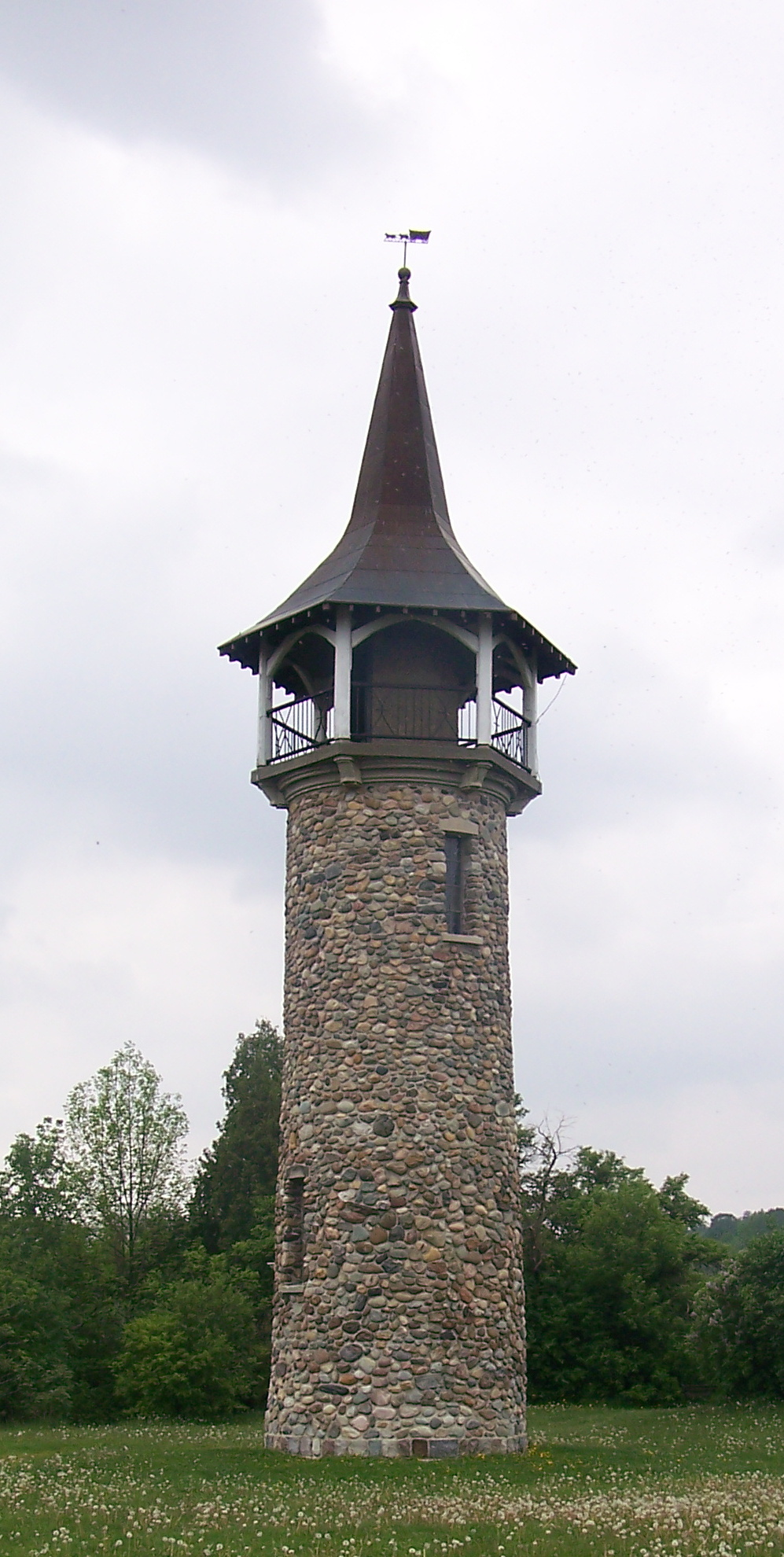
The Pioneer Memorial Tower, dedicated the Pennsylvania-German pioneers who arrived between 1800 and 1803

Other settlers followed, mostly from Pennsylvania, and also purchased land in Block Number 2, German Company Tract from Richard Beasley who had acquired a massive territory previously owned by the Six Nations.

The first school opened in 1802 near the village of Blair, then known as Shinglebridge; it became part of Preston, Ontario and then part of Cambridge, Ontario. The first teacher's name was Mr. Rittenhaus.

After 1803, many Pennsylvania pioneers bought lots from the German Company, established by Mennonites from Lancaster County, Pennsylvania. The 60,000-acre section included most of Block 2 of the former Grand River Indian Lands acquired by Beasley and previously owned by the Six Nations Indians. Many farms were 400 or more acres in size.

Most settlers before 1830 were Pennsylvania Mennonites, often called Pennsylvania Dutch (an anglicization of Deutsch) because of the German dialect they spoke from their origins in Germany and Switzerland.

By the early 1800s, a corduroy road had been built along what is now King Street in Waterloo; its remains were unearthed in 2016. The road was probably built by Mennonites using technology acquired in Lancaster County Pennsylvania, between the late 1790s and 1816. The log road was buried in about 1840 and a new road built on top of it. A historian explained that the road had been built for access to the mill but was also "one of the first roads cut through (the woods) so people could start settling the area".

In 1806, Abraham Erb, from Franklin County, bought 900 acres (360 ha) from the German Company in what would be later part of the City of Waterloo. The putative founder of the city, Erb built a sawmill in 1808 and a gristmill in 1816; the latter operated for 111 years and still stands in Waterloo Park.

Benjamin Eby arrived from Lancaster County in 1806. The putative founder of Kitchener, he purchased a large tract in that area. The settlement, Ebytown, was on the south-east side of present-day Queen Street. Ordained a Mennonite pastor in 1809, and later a bishop, Eby oversaw the building of the first church in 1813 and the confession's subsequent growth. Many Mennonite meeting houses, or places of worship, were basic frame buildings, a structure still common among Old Order Mennonites in rural Waterloo Region. Settlers often held a "bee" to help newcomers erect large buildings, a custom that persists today among traditional Mennonite communities.

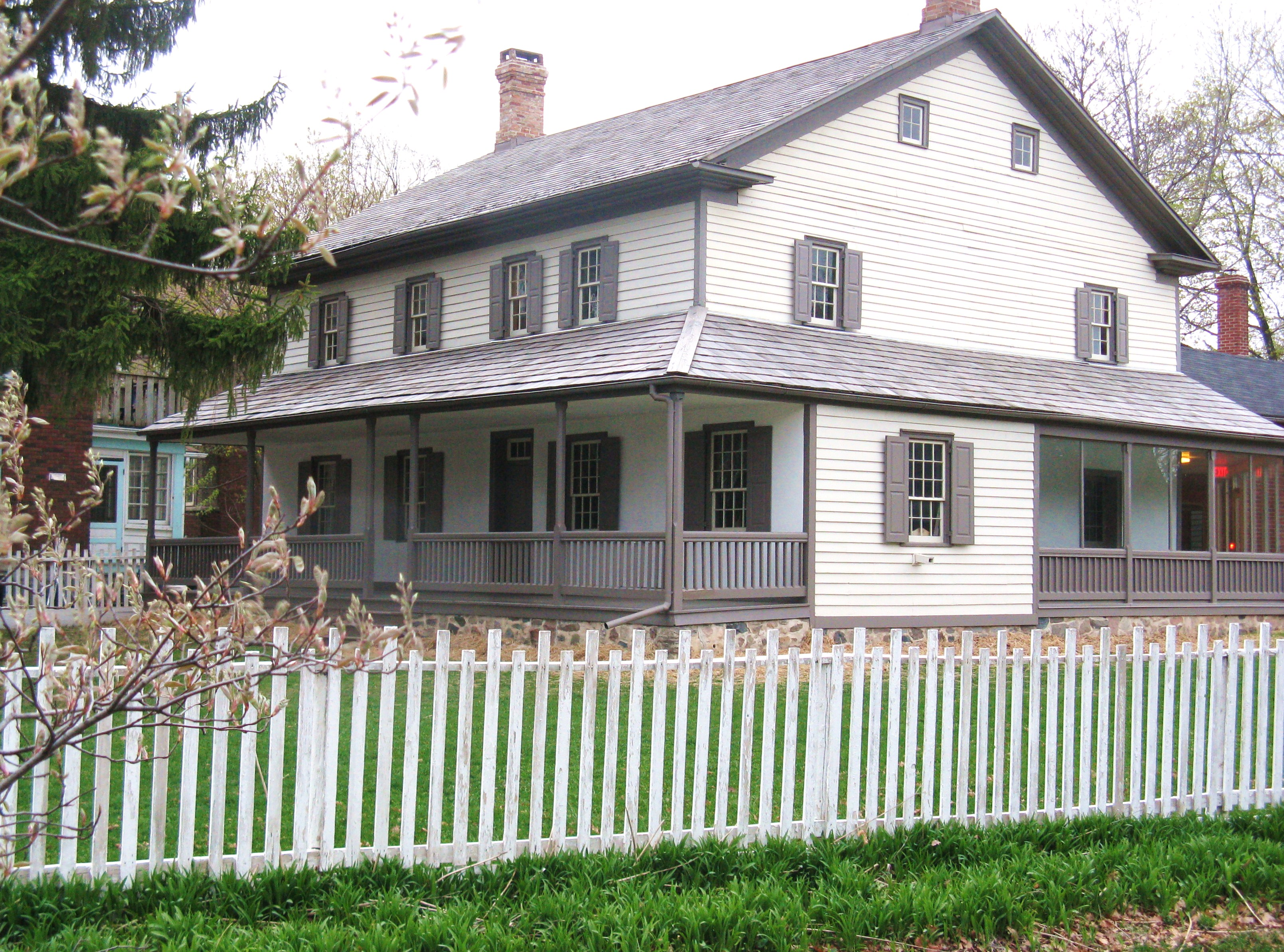
The restored Joseph Schneider Haus, circa 1816, was built by one of the early settlers in Berlin

In 1806, Joseph Schneider, of south German stock, arrived from Lancaster County. He bought lot 17 of the German Company Tract of block 2. A farmer, he helped build what became "Schneider's Road". By 1816, he had built a sawmill.

In 1807, Pennsylvanians John and Jacob Erb, among others, purchased 45,195 acres (182.9 km^{2}) of Block 3 (Woolwich township).

The War of 1812 interrupted immigration from the United States. The pacifist Mennonite settlers were employed in camps, hospitals and transportation.

Samuel and Elia Schneider arrived in 1816.

A network of small settlements emerged. Abram Weber settled on the corner of later King and Wilmot Streets, and David Weber by the later Grand Trunk Railway station.

Benjamin Eby encouraged manufacturers to move to Ebytown. Jacob Hoffman arrived around 1830 to start the regions's first furniture factory.

==== 1820 to 1852 ====
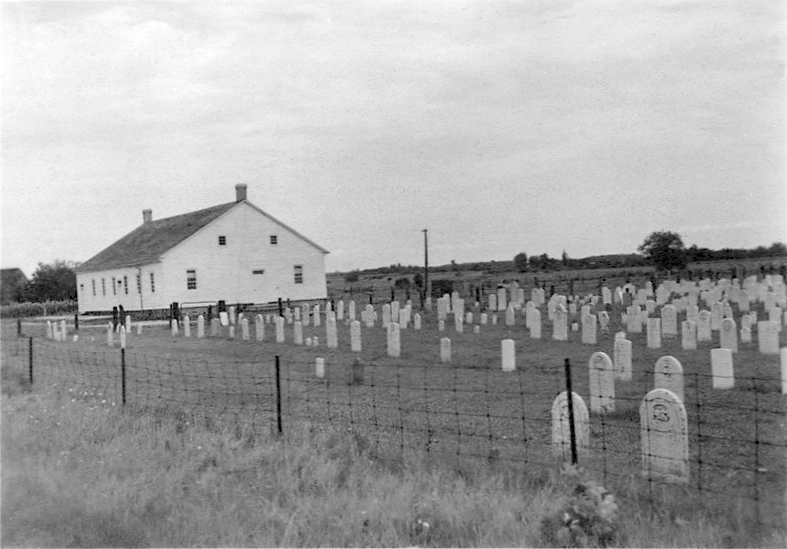
Martins Old Order Mennonite Church

Immigration continued strongly in the 1820s, driven by a severe agricultural depression in Lancaster County. John Eby, druggist and chemist, arrived from Pennsylvania about 1820 and opened a shop west of present-day Eby Street. In the same year, after clearing a farm and creating a rough road, Joseph Schneider built a frame house on the south side of the future Queen Street; the renovated home still stands. The settlement around "Schneider's Road" became the nucleus of Berlin.

In 1830, Phineas Varnum established the centre of later Berlin (Kitchener). Leasing land from Joseph Schneider, he opened a blacksmith shop on the site of the later Walper House (now the Walper Hotel). A tavern and store opened there at the same time. Still considered a hamlet, Ebytown became Berlin in 1833.

By 1830, the village of Preston was a thriving business centre under the impulse of Jacob Hespeler, a native of Württemberg. He later moved to the village of New Hope, renamed Hespeler in 1857 in recognition of his enterprise and public service. Jacob Beck, from the Grand Duchy of Baden, founded the village of Baden in Wilmot Township and started a foundry and machine shop. Jacob Beck was the father of Sir Adam Beck, founder of the Hydro-Electric Power Commission of Ontario.

By 1835, many immigrants were coming to Waterloo County from Germany and the British Isles. The Germans settled in areas like New Germany in the Lower Block of Block Two. In 1835, some 70% of the population was Mennonite; by 1851, that number had declined to 26% of a much larger population.

The county's first newspaper, Canada Museum und Allgemeine Zeitung, came off the press on August 27, 1835. Written mostly in German with some English articles, it was published for five years.

By the 1840s, the growing German-speaking population had made the area a popular choice for German immigrants. They founded communities in the south of the Mennonite area. The largest was Berlin (now Kitchener).

In 1841, the population count was 4,424. Smith's Canadian Gazetteer of 1846 states that the population of Waterloo Township, within Waterloo County, consisted primarily of Pennsylvania Mennonites and German immigrants who had brought money with them. Many spoke no English. There were now eight grist and twenty saw mills in the township. In 1846 the village of Waterloo had a population of 200, "mostly Germans". It had a grist mill, a sawmill and some tradesmen. Berlin (Kitchener) had a population of about 400, also "mostly German", and more tradesmen than the village of Waterloo.

==== After 1852 ====
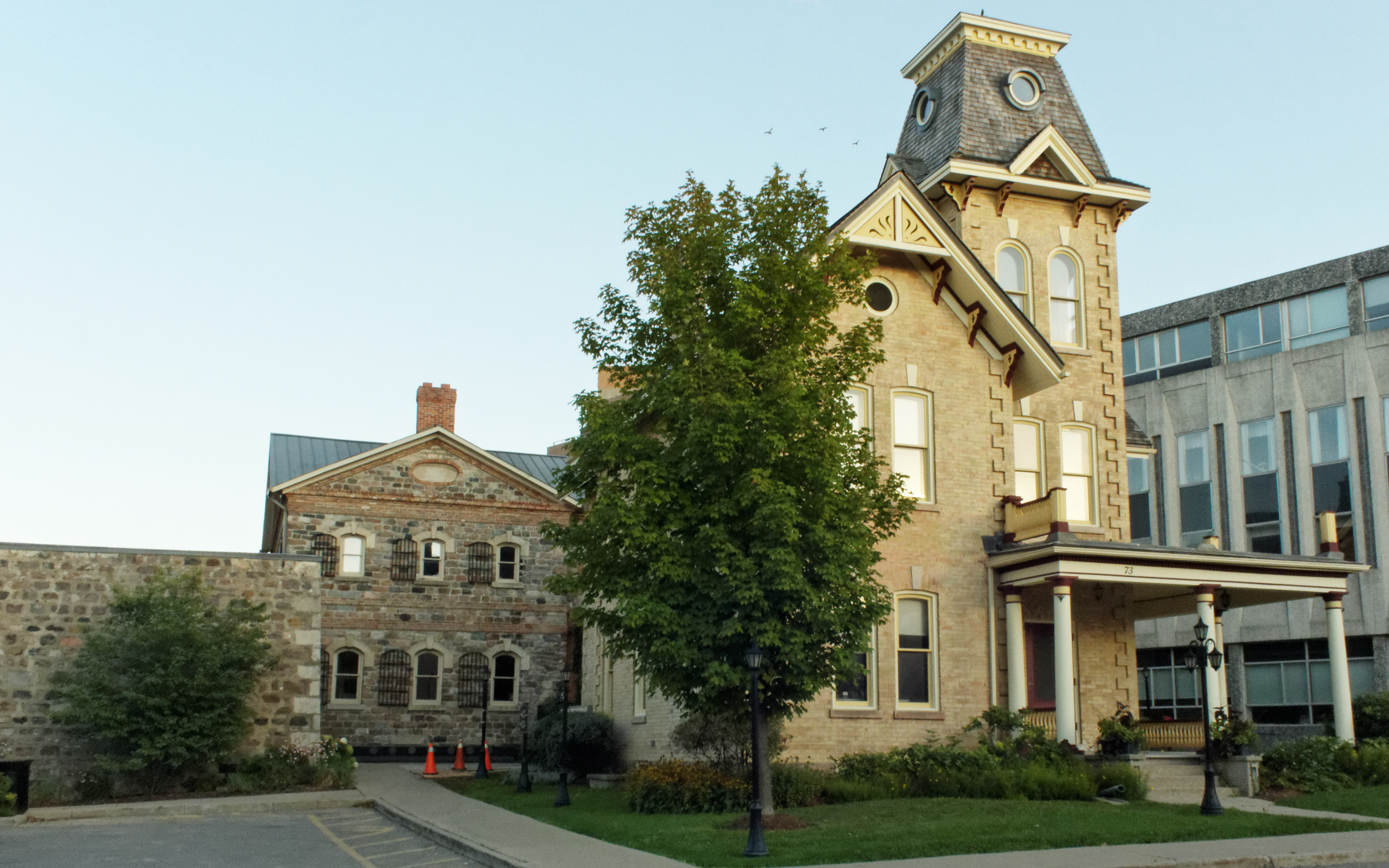
Waterloo County Jail and Governor's House, Kitchener, built 1852

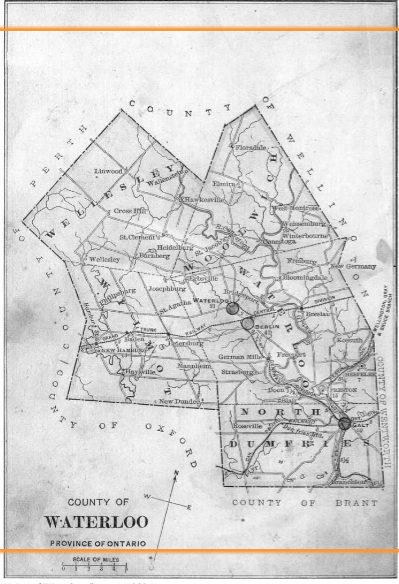
Map of Waterloo County, 1883

Previously part of the United County of Waterloo, Wellington and Grey, Waterloo became a separate entity in 1853, with five townships. Galt and Berlin contended to be the county seat; one requirement was the construction of a courthouse and jail. When local merchant Joseph Gaukel donated a small portion of his land for that purpose at the corner of present current Queen and Weber streets, Berlin was selected. A courthouse and gaol were built within a few months.

The first county council meeting was held in the new facility on 24 January 1853. Both buildings figure in the Canadian Register of Historic Places. The council included 12 members from the five townships and two villages; Dr. John Scott was appointed as the first warden (reeve). In the following years, the region's physical and social infrastructure developed to include roads, bridges, agricultural societies, markets, and schools.

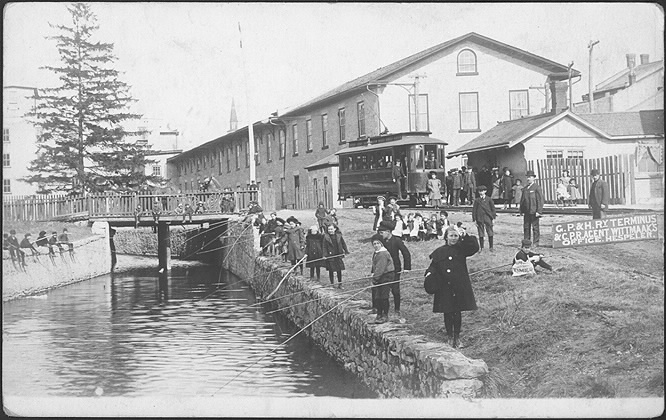
The electric railway connected all of the towns and cities of Waterloo County by 1911

The Grand Trunk railway reached Berlin in 1856, accelerating industrial growth. Over the next decade, comfortable homes replaced the early settlers' log cabins.

==== House of Industry and Refuge ====
In 1869, the county built a large "Poorhouse" with an attached farm, the House of Industry and Refuge. It accommodated some 3,200 people before being closed down in 1951 and later demolished. Located on Frederick St. in Kitchener, behind the now Frederick Street Mall, it sought to help indigents and convicts before social welfare programmes became available. A 2009 report by the Toronto Star stated that "pauperism was considered a moral failing that could be erased through order and hard work".

==== Electric streetcar ====
A new streetcar system, the Galt, Preston and Hespeler electric railway (later called the Grand River Railway) began operation in 1894, connecting Preston and Galt. In 1911, the line reached Hespeler, Berlin (Kitchener) and Waterloo; by 1916 it had been extended to Brantford/Port Dover. The electric rail system ended passenger services in April, 1955.

==== German heritage ====
Some sources estimate that roughly 50,000 European Germans arrived in the Waterloo area from 1830 to 1860. Unlike the largely German-speaking Mennonites from Pennsylvania, the later arrivals – from Germany, Austria, Switzerland, and present day and Poland, France and Russia, were of other denominations. The first groups were predominantly Roman Catholic; those who arrive later were primarily Lutheran.

In 1862, German-speaking groups held a Sängerfest ("Singer Festival") that attracted an estimated 10,000 people. The festival continued for several years.

By 1863, Berlin's German population exceeded 2,000. The community started the Friedenfest to celebrate the German victory in the Franco-Prussian war. The event continued annual until the start of World War I.

By 1871, nearly 55 percent of the population had German origins, including the Pennsylvania Mennonites and European Germans. This group greatly outnumbered the Scots (18 per cent), the English (12.6 per cent) and the Irish (8 per cent). Berlin, Ontario was a bilingual town, with German being the dominant language spoken. More than one visitor commented on the necessity of speaking German in Berlin.

In 1897, the Canadians with origins in Germany raised funds to erect a large monument, with a bronze bust of Kaiser Wilhelm I, in Victoria Park. The monument would be destroyed by townspeople just after the start of World War I.

By the early 1900s, northern Waterloo County – the Kitchener, Waterloo, Elmira area – exhibited a strong German culture and those of German origin made up a third of the population in 1911. Lutherans were the primary religious group. There were nearly three times as many Lutherans as Mennonites at that time. The latter primarily resided in the rural areas and small communities.

Before and during World War I, there was some anti-German sentiment in Canada and some cultural sanctions on the community, particularly in Berlin, Ontario. However, by 1919 most of the population of what would become Kitchener-Waterloo and Elmira were Canadian by birth; over 95 percent had been born in Ontario. Those of the Mennonite religion were pacifist, so they could not enlist, while others who were not born in Canada refused to fight against the country of their birth. Anti-German sentiment during World War I was the primary reason for renaming Berlin to Kitchener in 1916 to honour British Field Marshal Lord Kitchener, who had died that year when his cruiser was sunk by a German submarine.

The Waterloo Pioneer Memorial Tower built in 1926 commemorates the settlement by the Pennsylvania Dutch (Pennsilfaanisch Deitsch or Pennsylvania German) of the Grand River area in what later became Waterloo County.

The region is still home to the largest population of Old Order Mennonites in Canada, particularly in the areas around St Jacobs and Elmira.

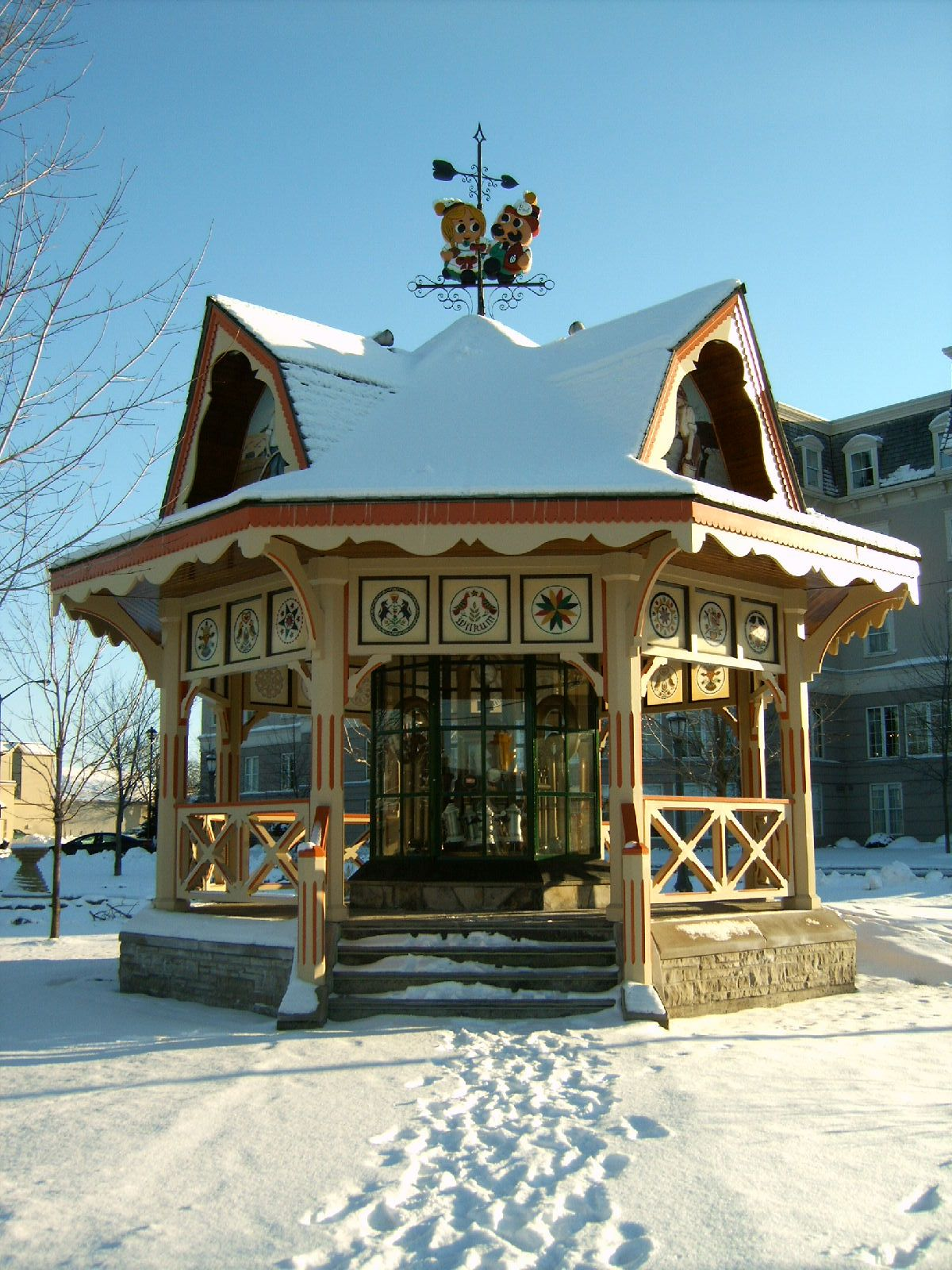
The Oktoberfest Timeteller in Waterloo

Over time, after WW II, the anti-German sentiment faded. The Kitchener-Waterloo Oktoberfest event, with beer halls and German entertainment, and a large parade, was established in 1969 to honour the Region's German heritage. The events typically attract an average of 700,000 people to the county. During the 2016 Oktoberfest parade, an estimated 150,000 people lined the streets along the route.

In the year 2000, the Government of Ontario declared an annual German Pioneers Day to recognize the achievements of settlers from Germany. Each year since then, the Waterloo Region area honours the current families of several such pioneers who had settled in the area.

The Waterloo region remained predominantly German-speaking until the early 20th century, and its German heritage is reflected in the region's large Lutheran community and the annual Kitchener-Waterloo Oktoberfest.

There are still traditional Mennonite communities located north of Kitchener-Waterloo. While the best known is St. Jacobs, with its very popular thrice-weekly outdoor market, the community of Linwood has attracted increased tourist volume in recent years.

=== Restructuring ===
In 1973, the regional municipality style of government was imposed on the county by the provincial government. The cities of Galt, Kitchener, and Waterloo were previously independent single tier municipalities prior to joining the newly formed regional municipality. In that major reorganization, the fifteen towns and townships of the county were reduced to just seven in the new Region of Waterloo. The new city of Cambridge was created through the amalgamation of the City of Galt, the towns of Preston and Hespeler, the Village of Blair, and various parcels of township land. One township vanished when the former Waterloo Township was divided among Woolwich Township and the three cities of Kitchener, Waterloo, and Cambridge. The settlement of Bridgeport was annexed to the city of Kitchener. The settlement of Erbsville was annexed to the city of Waterloo. The former county government was given broader powers as a regional municipality.

Regardless of the resistance, the amalgamation proceeded and became effective 1 January 1973, creating the Region of Waterloo, with Jack A. Young appointed by the provincial government as the first Regional Chair. The region took over many services, including police, waste management, recreation, planning, roads and social services.

Further municipal amalgamation began discussions in the 1990s, with little progress. In late 2005, Kitchener's city council voted to visit the subject again, with the possibility of reducing the seven constituent municipalities into one or more cities. A new proposal in 2010 would study only the merger of Kitchener and Waterloo, with a public referendum on whether the idea should be looked into. Kitchener residents voted 2–1 in favour of studying the merger while Waterloo residents voted 2–1 against. Waterloo city council voted against the study.

== Government ==
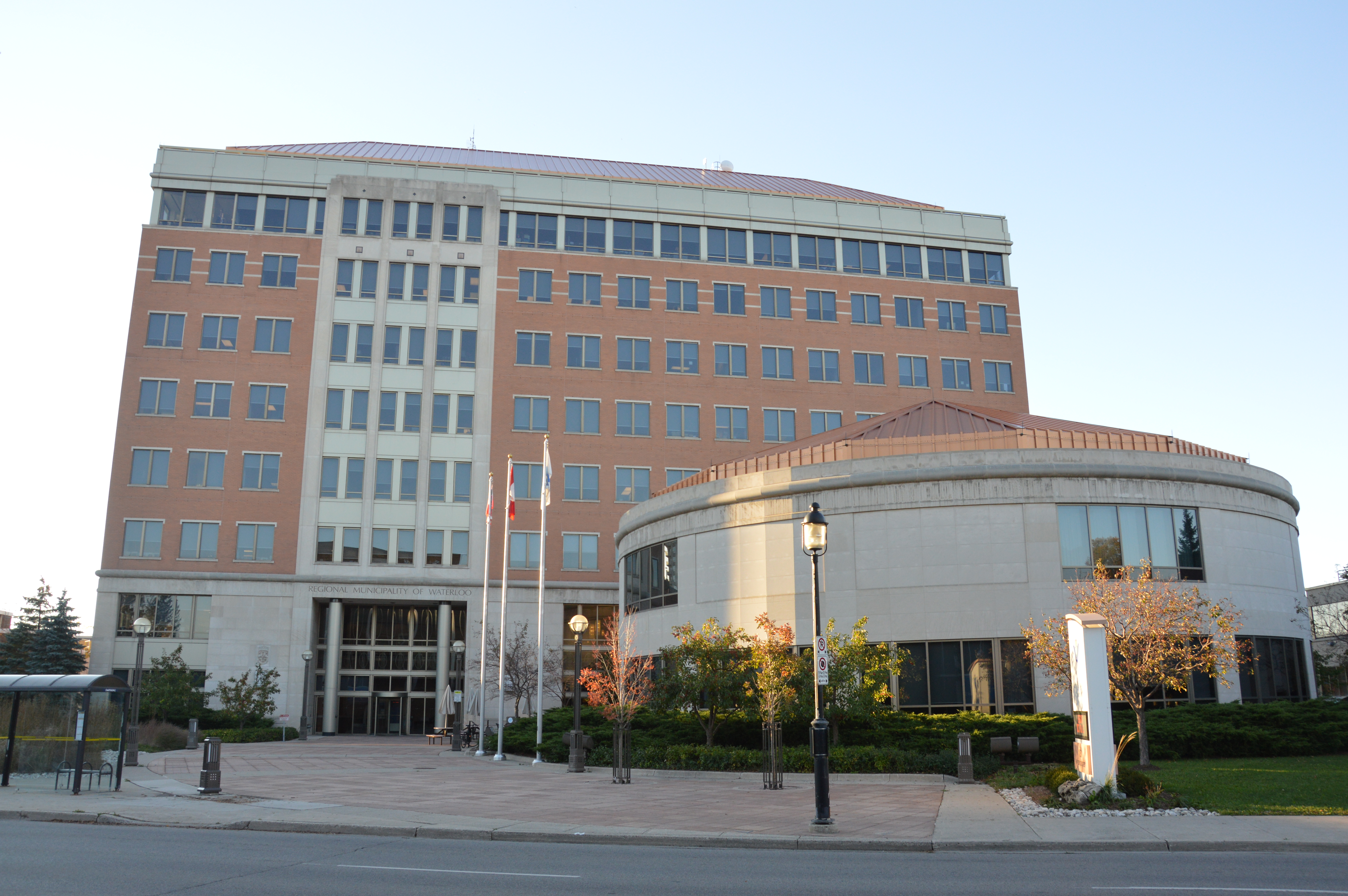
Region of Waterloo Headquarters in Kitchener

The region's governing body is the 16 member Waterloo Regional Council. The council consists of the Regional Chair, the mayors of the seven cities and townships, and eight additional councillors – four from Kitchener and two each from Cambridge and Waterloo.

Beginning in 1978, the Regional Chair was appointed for a 2-year term by the councillors, who were elected by the citizens of Waterloo Region. James E. (Jim) Gray was appointed in 1978. In 1982, the Chair's term was extended to 3 years and Jim Gray was appointed for his third term. He retired in 1985. Ken Seiling held the position of Regional Chair from 1985 to 2018, when he declined to run again for the seat. His successor is Karen Redman.

From 1997 to 2022, the citizens of Waterloo Region directly elected the chair. In 2022, of the nine regional municipalities in Ontario, Waterloo Region and the Regional Municipality of Halton were the only ones that allowed for direct election of the chair. This practice was ended by the provincial government under Doug Ford via the Better Regional Governance Act, 2026, which gives the province the power to appoint the chairs of Waterloo Region and most other regional municipalities going forward.

== Communities ==
Census Subdivision	Population (2021 census)
City of Kitchener	256,885
City of Cambridge	138,479
City of Waterloo	121,436
Township of Woolwich	26,999
Township of Wilmot	21,429
Township of Wellesley	11,318
Township of North Dumfries	10,619

Within the townships are many communities. Some were once independent and had their own reeves and councils but lost this status in amalgamation. These communities include: Ayr, Baden, Bloomingdale, Breslau, Conestogo, Doon, Elmira, Freeport, Heidelberg, Mannheim, Maryhill, New Dundee, New Hamburg, Petersburg, Roseville, St. Agatha, St. Clements, St. Jacobs, Wellesley, West Montrose, and Winterbourne.

== Demographics ==
As a census division in the 2021 Census of Population conducted by Statistics Canada, the Regional Municipality of Waterloo had a population of 587,165 living in 222,426 of its 233,253 total private dwellings, a change of 9.7% from its 2016 population of 535,154. With a land area of 1,370.07 km^{2} (528.99 sq mi), it had a population density of 428.6/km^{2} (1,110.0/sq mi) in 2021.

Canada census – Regional Municipality of Waterloo community profile

	2021	2016	2011
Population	587,165 (+9.7% from 2016)	535,154 (5.5% from 2011)	507,096 (6.1% from 2006)
Land area	1,370.07 km^{2} (528.99 sq mi)	1,368.92 km^{2} (528.54 sq mi)	1,368.94 km^{2} (528.55 sq mi)
Population density	428.6/km^{2} (1,110/sq mi)	390.9/km^{2} (1,012/sq mi)	370.4/km^{2} (959/sq mi)
Median age	38.0 (M: 36.4, F: 39.2)	38.5 (M: 37.4, F: 39.6)	37.7 (M: 36.6, F: 38.7)
Private dwellings	233,253 (total) 222,426 (occupied)	203,830 (total)	202,121 (total)
Median household income	$92,000	$77,530

References: 2021 2016 2011

Historical census populations – Regional Municipality of Waterloo

Year	Pop.	±%
1976	289,129	—
1981	305,496	+5.7%
1986	329,404	+7.8%
1991	377,762	+14.7%
1996	405,435	+7.3%

Year	Pop.	±%
2001	438,515	+8.2%
2006	478,121	+9.0%
2011	507,096	+6.1%
2016	535,154	+5.5%
2021	587,165	+9.7%

Source: Statistics Canada

Immigrants accounted for 22.6% of the region's total population according to the 2016 Canadian Census, while visible minorities accounted for 19.0% of the region's total population.

=== Language ===
Waterloo Region's top 15 languages spoken most often at home (2021)
Mother Tongue Languages	Population	Percentage
English	467,460	80.29%
Punjabi	8,130	1.40%
Mandarin	7,635	1.31%
Arabic	6,290	1.08%
Spanish	5,835	1.0%
High German	5,010	0.86%
Portuguese	4,645	0.80%
Serbo-Croatian	4,550	0.78%
Urdu	3,760	0.65%
Gujarati	3,755	0.64%
Persian	3,020	0.52%
Hindi	2,620	0.45%
Vietnamese	2,570	0.44%
Romanian	2,400	0.41%
Polish	2,120	0.36%

=== Ethnicity ===
Panethnic groups in the Regional Municipality of Waterloo (2001−2021)
Panethnic group	2021		2016		2011		2006		2001	
Panethnic group	Pop.	%	Pop.	%	Pop.	%	Pop.	%	Pop.	%
European (Note: Statistic includes all persons that did not make up part of a visible minority or an indigenous identity.)	410,365	70.83%	418,335	79.33%	415,700	83.2%	406,470	85.89%	386,355	89.05%
South Asian	55,380	9.56%	26,720	5.07%	21,170	4.24%	16,415	3.47%	11,355	2.62%
African	26,590	4.59%	15,135	2.87%	10,535	2.11%	9,510	2.01%	7,390	1.7%
East Asian (Note: Statistic includes total responses of "Chinese", "Korean", and "Japanese" under visible minority section on census.)	21,635	3.73%	19,195	3.64%	14,255	2.85%	11,575	2.45%	7,565	1.74%
Middle Eastern (Note: Statistic includes total responses of "West Asian" and "Arab" under visible minority section on census.)	17,000	2.93%	11,450	2.17%	8,815	1.76%	5,900	1.25%	3,565	0.82%
Southeast Asian (Note: Statistic includes total responses of "Filipino" and "Southeast Asian" under visible minority section on census.)	16,525	2.85%	11,815	2.24%	10,285	2.06%	8,080	1.71%	6,585	1.52%
Latin American	12,810	2.21%	9,145	1.73%	8,200	1.64%	6,910	1.46%	4,870	1.12%
Indigenous	9,960	1.72%	8,985	1.7%	6,825	1.37%	4,810	1.02%	3,340	0.77%
Other (Note: Statistic includes total responses of "Visible minority, n.i.e." and "Multiple visible minorities" under visible minority section on census.)	9,135	1.58%	6,575	1.25%	3,820	0.76%	3,595	0.76%	2,860	0.66%
Total responses	579,380	98.67%	527,340	98.54%	499,615	98.52%	473,260	98.98%	433,875	98.94%
Total population	587,165	100%	535,154	100%	507,096	100%	478,121	100%	438,515	100%
Note: Totals greater than 100% due to multiple origin responses

== Economy ==
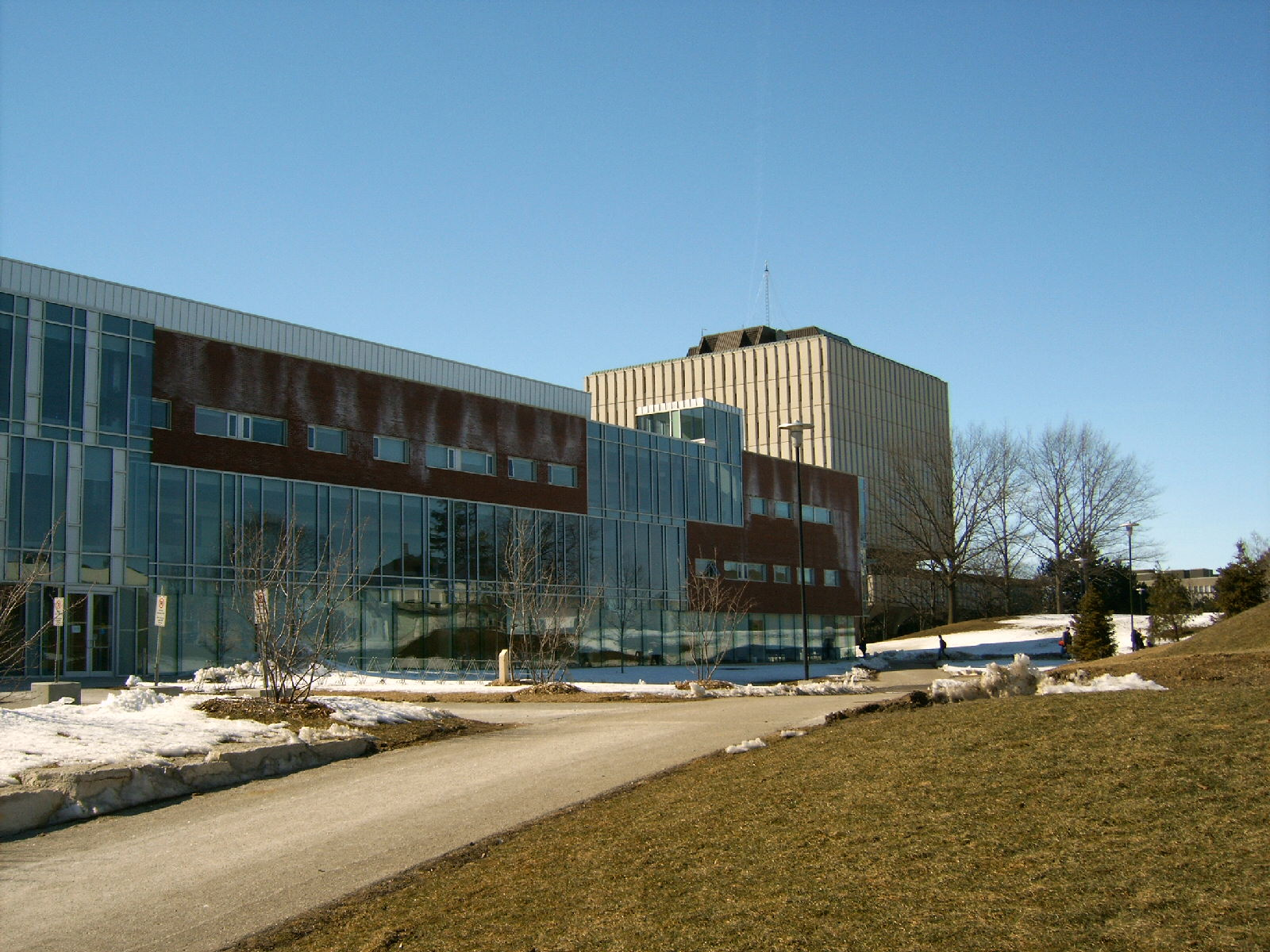
University of Waterloo is noted for its cooperative education programs, which allow the students to integrate their education with applicable work experiences.

Waterloo Region is also experiencing significant commercial growth. The presence of two universities, the University of Waterloo and Wilfrid Laurier University, acts as a catalyst for high-tech growth and innovation. The region is known for its high concentration of tech companies, such as BlackBerry (formerly Research In Motion), OpenText, Kik, and Maplesoft. As such, it has often been referred to as "Canada's Silicon Valley".

Canada's top three fastest growing tech companies are located in the Region: Kitchener's ApplyBoard, Intellijoint Surgical, and Waterloo's Auvik Networks. The list also includes Kitchener's Smile.io, and Vidyard.

=== Major employers in the region ===
- Waterloo Region District School Board (5,000 employees)
- Toyota Motor Manufacturing Canada (6,500 employees)
- Manulife Financial (3,800 employees)
- University of Waterloo (3,500 employees)
- Sun Life Financial (3,300 employees)
- BlackBerry Ltd (3,000 employees)
- Waterloo Regional Health Network (4,800 employees)
- ATS Automation Tooling Systems (1,800 employees)
- City of Kitchener (1,700 employees)

== Real estate ==
As of October 2023, the average (mean) selling price of a detached home sold on the Multiple Listing System of Waterloo Region was $890,591 (in Canadian dollars), an increase of 1.1 per cent compared to October 2022. The average selling price for an apartment style condominium was $476,166, a decrease of 2.6 per cent from October 2022. These prices are significantly less than prices in Toronto, where the average selling price for a detached home in the 416 area code was $1,718,440 in October 2023, and the average selling price for an apartment style condominium was $729,160.

== Crime rate ==
The national average for the crime severity index was 78.10 per 100,000 people in 2022, while the rate was slightly higher for Waterloo Region at 79.12 per 100,000 people. By comparison, the rate for Ontario was 58.47 per 100,000 people, and nearby cities Guelph and London were 60.56 and 73.98 respectively. By comparison, "Canada's most dangerous place", North Battleford, Saskatchewan, had an index of 353 in 2016.

An updated report by Maclean's in 2019 ranked the Region as the 49th most dangerous community in Canada, with robbery approximately as prevalent as the Canadian average of 60 incidents per 100,000 people. The region has a homicide rate of 0.89 per 100,000, below the Canadian average of 1.68 per 100,000.

== Services ==
Over time, many services have come to be delegated to the jurisdiction of the municipal government. These include police, emergency medical services, waste management, licensing enforcement, recycling, a food bank, and the public transit system. The main administration of these services is run from Kitchener, however many service offices may be found in different parts of the Region. For example, from a geographically central location in north Cambridge, maintenance operations and the police headquarters are able to manage operations and provide services to the entire service area.

=== Health care ===
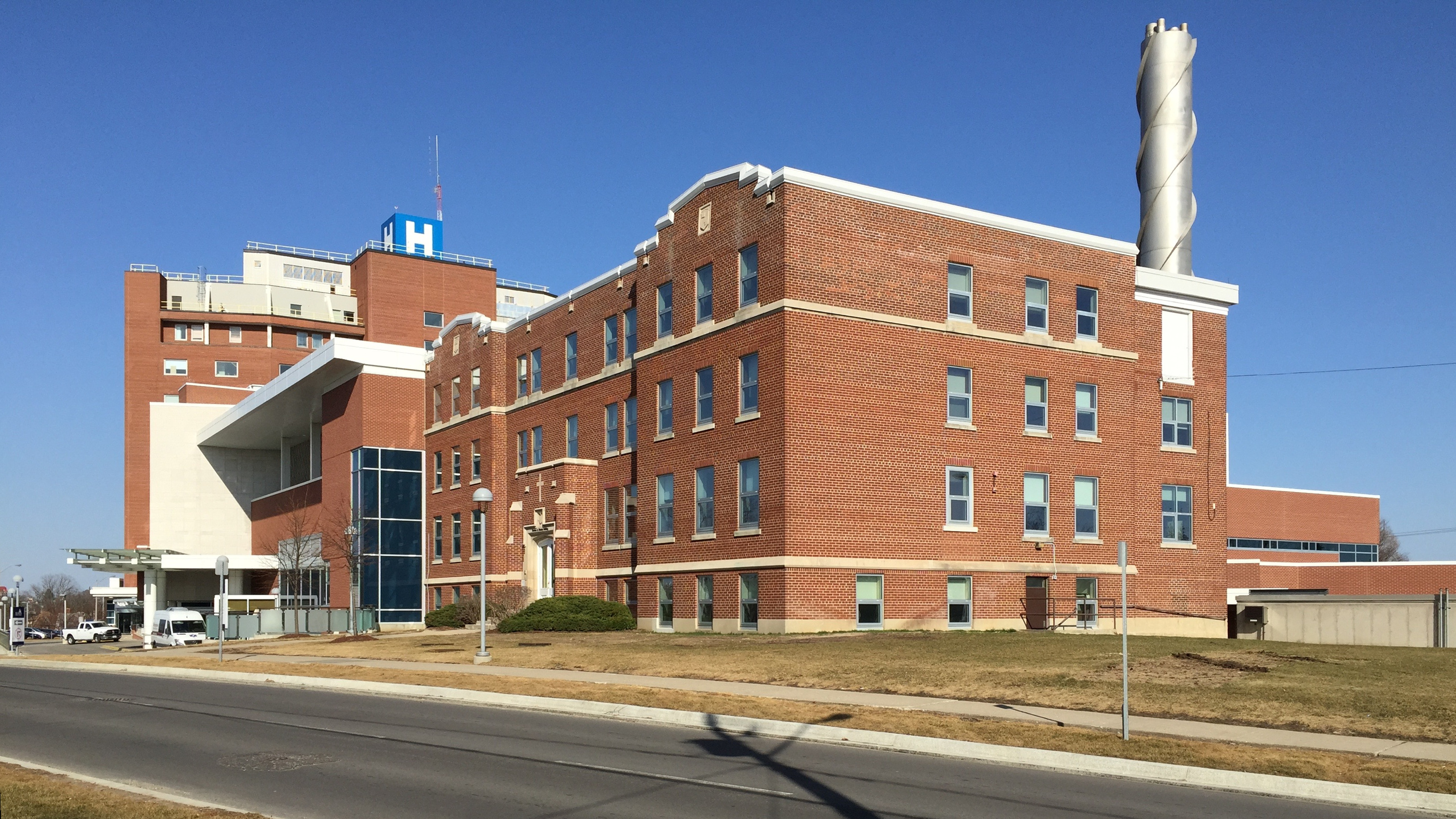
St. Mary's General Hospital

Hospital services in the region are provided by Grand River Hospital which includes a Freeport Campus and St. Mary's General Hospital, both located in Kitchener, as well as Cambridge Memorial Hospital. All three were highly ranked for safety in a national comparison study in 2017–2018, particularly the two located in Kitchener, but all would benefit from reduced wait times. Long-term care beds are provided at numerous facilities, including the Village of Winston Park in Kitchener and Saint Luke's Place in Cambridge which were promised additional funding by the province in 2018 for expansion.

Grand River Hospital has a capacity of 574-beds; the Freeport location was merged into it in April 1995. That secondary campus provides complex continuing care, rehabilitation, longer-term specialized mental health and other services. The King St. location is also the home of the Grand River Regional Cancer Centre which opened in 2003. St. Mary's General Hospital is a 150-bed adult acute-care facility and includes the Regional Cardiac Care Centre with two cardiovascular operating rooms, an eight-bed cardiovascular intensive care unit and 45 inpatient beds. As of late 2018, Cambridge Memorial had 143 beds but was in the midst of a major expansion. The general contractor went into receivership in late 2018 and that stalled the process; the new section was not expected to be completed until approximately 2021. The expansion will eventually add 54 new beds and double the size of the Emergency department.

Family doctors are often in short supply, and a source of great concern among residents. Recruiting efforts over the previous 15 years certainly achieved some success as of September 2018, but needed to be continued.

Announced January 2006, as a new School of Medicine, the Waterloo Regional Campus of McMaster University was completed in 2009. In 2018, the campus included "a complete on-site clinical skills laboratory with 4 skills rooms and 2 observation rooms, classrooms with video-conferencing capabilities and a state-of-the-art anatomy lab that was built in 2013 with a high definition video system", according to the university. Its Michael G. DeGroote School of Medicine building includes the Centre for Family Medicine and the University of Waterloo School of Optometry and Vision Science.

== Transportation ==
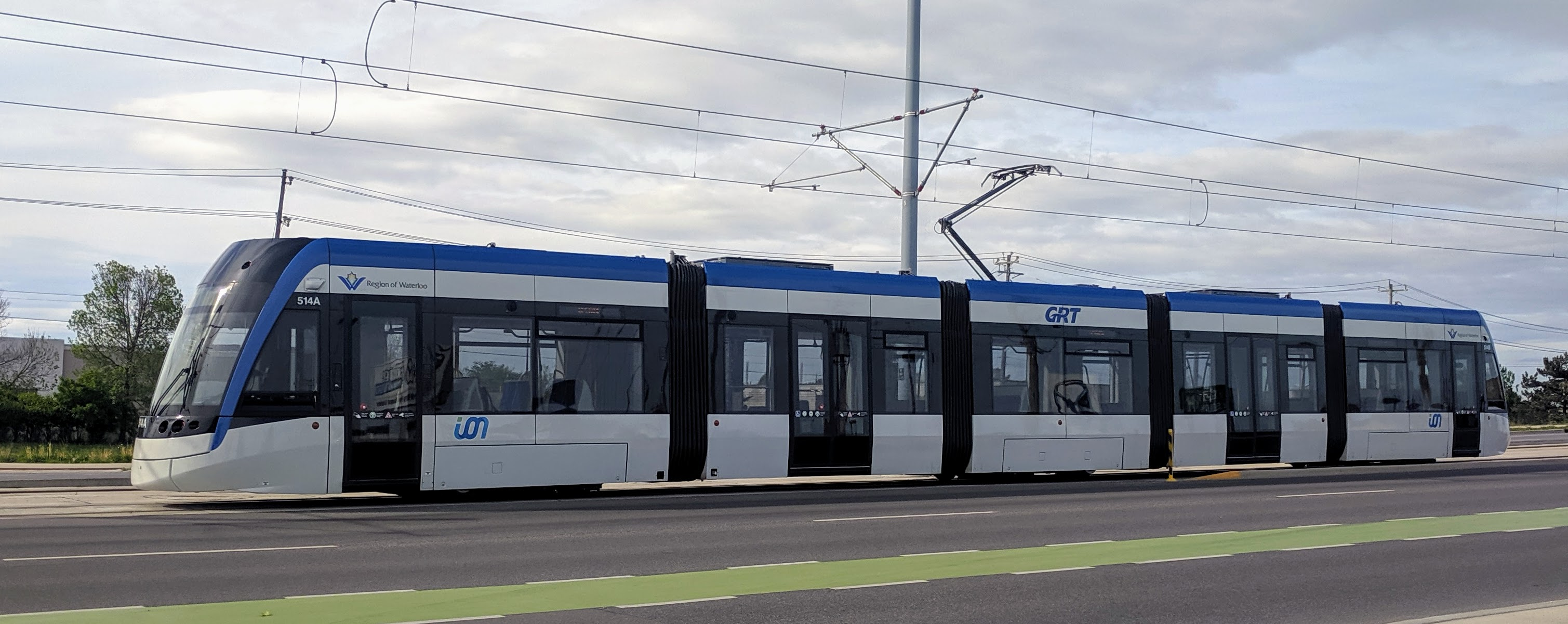
Ion light rail vehicle in service

Public transportation is provided by Grand River Transit, which is an amalgamation of the former Cambridge Transit and Kitchener Transit systems, the latter of which had also served the City of Waterloo for many decades.

In June 2011, regional council approved the plan for a light rail transit (LRT) line from Conestoga Mall in north Waterloo to Fairview Park Mall in south Kitchener, with rapid buses through to Cambridge. In Stage 1, the Ion rapid transit system runs between Waterloo and Kitchener, passing through the downtown/uptown areas. This phase opened in 2019.

Until light rail transit is extended to the downtown Galt area of Cambridge from Kitchener in Stage 2, the rapid transit link will use specially branded buses between Fairview Park Mall and the Ainslie Street Transit Terminal. Other stops for this Ion bus are at Hespeler Road at the Delta, Can-Amera, Cambridge Centre, Pinebush, and Sportsworld. The rapid transit bus uses bus-only priority traffic signals at Pinebush, Sportsworld, and other places to minimize slowdowns at times of heavy traffic.

Construction on the light rail system began in August 2014, and the Stage 1 service was expected to begin in late 2017. In 2016, however, the start date was changed to early 2018 because of delays in the manufacture and delivery of the vehicles by Bombardier Transportation. By March 2017 a single sample-only train car had arrived. All trams were eventually delivered by December 2018 and the service started operating on June 21, 2019.

By late February 2017, plans for the Stage 2 (Cambridge section) of the Ion rail service were in the very early stage with public consultations just getting started. (At least one journalist has pointed out the similarity between this plan and the electric Grand River Railway of the early 1900s.) As the original plan to share the CP Rail line had become unworkable since the original route had been planned, a new route between Kitchener and Preston was proposed. Multiple options for the new Stage 2 route were researched and presented to the public, with Regional Council approving the final route and preliminary design on April 22, 2020, and starting the required environmental assessment later in December.

Waterloo Region was the home of the first carsharing organization in Ontario in 1998. Community CarShare Cooperative (previously known as Grand River CarShare) provides access to vehicles on a self-serve, pay-per-use basis. Cars are located in many neighbourhoods around the Region. It is meant to complement other sustainable modes of transportation such as public transit, biking, and carpooling, or act as a transition out of owning a vehicle. Community CarShare has 27 vehicles stationed in the Region of Waterloo.

The region also owns and operates the Region of Waterloo International Airport, near Breslau. The airport is the 20th busiest in Canada as of December 2010 and underwent a major expansion in 2003. GO Transit and Via Rail provide rail services to the region on the Kitchener line.

== Education ==
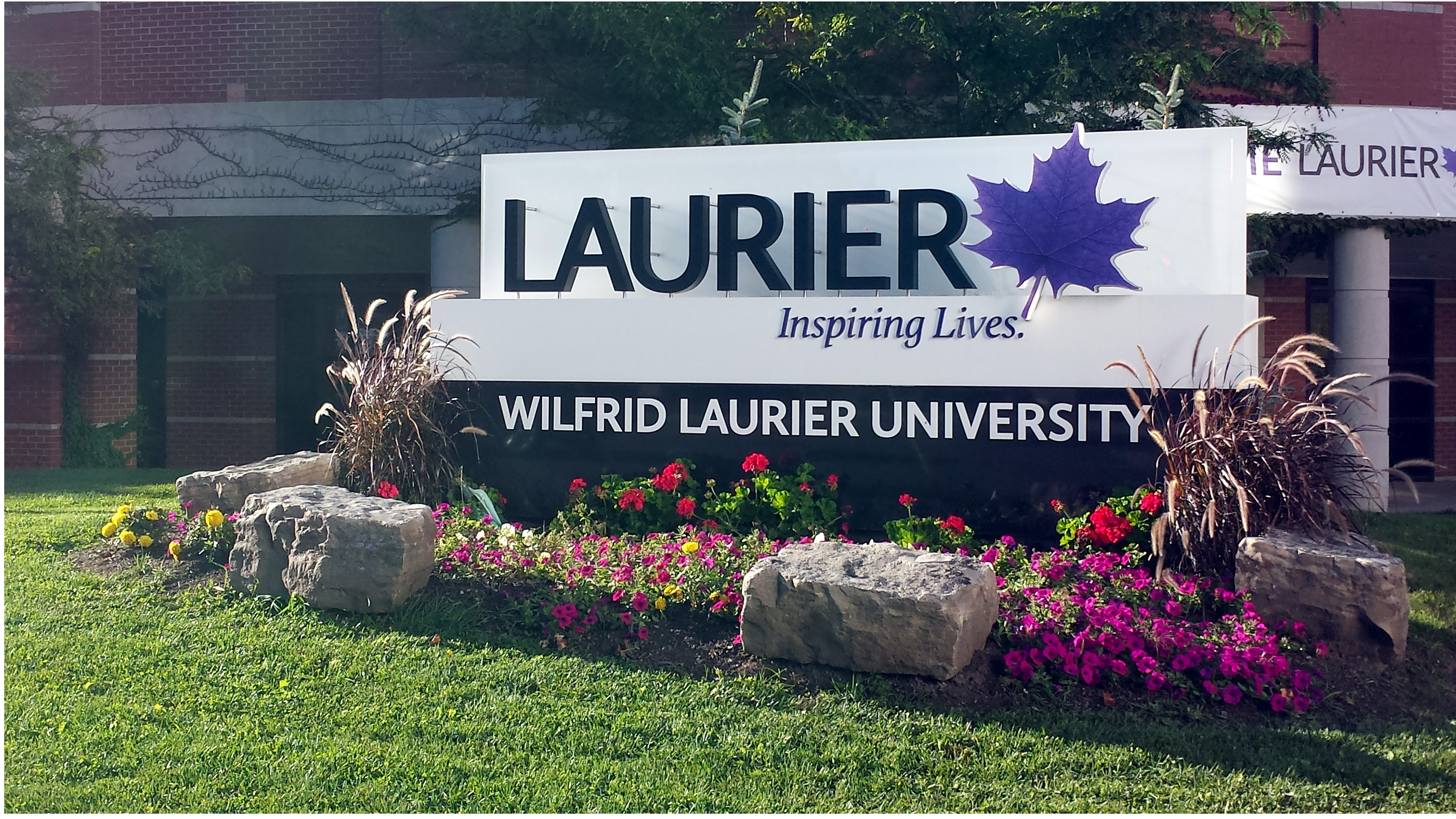
Wilfrid Laurier University is the smaller of the two universities in Waterloo

Waterloo Region is home to the University of Waterloo, Wilfrid Laurier University, and Conestoga College. For a list of all elementary and secondary schools in the area, see the List of Waterloo Region, Ontario schools.

== Sports ==
From July 30 to August 2, 2026, Waterloo Region (Cambridge, Kitchener, and Waterloo) co-hosted the 2026 Ontario Summer Games.

== Notable people ==
- David Bauer, Canadian ice hockey player and coach, educator and Catholic priest, inductee into multiple sports halls of fame
- Rich Beddoe is the drummer for the Canadian rock band Finger Eleven. He is from Cambridge, Ontario.
- Hockey player Todd Bertuzzi of the Detroit Red Wings makes his offseason home in Kitchener.
- Tim Brent is a hockey player from Cambridge, Ontario.
- Khashayar Farzam, Powerlifter and physician
- Amanda Burk, artist who grew up in Kitchener-Waterloo.
- David Chilton, author of the financial planning guide The Wealthy Barber was born in Kitchener and lives in the region.
- David Eby, Premier of British Columbia, was born and raised in Kitchener.
- Author and journalist Malcolm Gladwell grew up in Elmira, Ontario.
- Mike Hoffman, hockey player from Kitchener
- David Johnston, former president of the University of Waterloo and Governor General of Canada lives in Wellesley Township.
- Lisa LaFlamme, journalist, from Kitchener.
- William Lyon Mackenzie King, Canada's longest serving prime minister, was born in Kitchener's predecessor Berlin, Ontario. His boyhood home is now Woodside National Historic Site.
- Mike Lazaridis, founder of Research In Motion, came as a student to attend the University of Waterloo.
- Boxer Lennox Lewis lived in Kitchener from the age of 12 and began his boxing career there. He maintains a home in Kitchener.
- Lois Maxwell, Golden Globe winning actress and the original Miss Moneypenny in the James Bond movies, was born in Kitchener.
- Jamal Murray, professional basketball player from Kitchener
- Helmut Oberlander, Ukrainian former Canadian who was a member of the Einsatzgruppen death squads of Nazi Germany in the occupied Soviet Union during World War II
- Joseph E. Seagram was a partner in 1869, and sole owner in 1883, in the company later known as Seagram.
- Donald Shaver created a world leading poultry breeding business.
- Dave Sim, creator of the comic book Cerebus the Aardvark, has lived in Kitchener since he was two years old.
- Edna Staebler, author and literary journalist, best known for her series of cookbooks, particularly Food That Really Schmecks
- Former hockey all-star Scott Stevens of the New Jersey Devils was born in Kitchener and played for the Kitchener Rangers. He also maintains a home there.
- Landscape artist Homer Watson was born in the village of Doon (now part of Kitchener).

== See also ==
- List of municipalities in Ontario
- List of tallest buildings in the Waterloo Region
- List of townships in Ontario
- Quebec City–Windsor Corridor
