= The Food Bank of Waterloo Region =

Canadian non-profit organization

- Formation: 1984
- Founded at: Kitchener
- Type: Nonprofit
- Region served: Region of Waterloo
- Website: www.thefoodbank.ca

The Food Bank of Waterloo Region (sometimes stylized as FoodBank) is a non-profit community food assistance program that has served the Region of Waterloo in Ontario, Canada, since its inception in 1984.

== History ==
The recession of the 1980s affected Waterloo Region adversely, leading to unemployment and food insecurity. In response, the Kitchener Social Planning Council organized a committee to look for solutions to ameliorate the situation and provide relief. A food bank, a concept first developed in the United States, was one such proposal. In January 1984, the Food Bank of Waterloo Region opened in the basement of a house owned by the House of Friendship. This made it the first institution of its kind in Ontario.

Initially, the Food Bank supported six agencies in Waterloo Region. Using a cooperative food buying arrangement, the Food Bank collected food and stored it while the member agencies paid a nominal price for the items. While intended to be temporary, the use that the Food Bank saw from its inception led to other municipalities seeking to develop their own food banks. Within a year, the Food Bank joined with others in the province to cooperate and pool resources. Alongside Toronto, Ottawa, Windsor, Barrie, and Montreal this allowed for food to be distributed greater distances and to share resources.

By 2004, the Food Bank was operating out of its current location of 50 Alpine Court, Kitchener. It had a budget of $1.3 million and 15 staff.

In 2018, the Food Bank built a room designed for food processing. The Fresh Approaches room allows the Food Bank to cut down on waste and extend the life of products that it receives. Through this the Food Bank is able to provide more fresh produce.

By 2022, the Food Bank served more than 120 agencies in the community.

In December 2024, the Food Bank received $1.5 million in funding from the Region of Waterloo.

== Mission ==
The Food Bank is a non-profit community food assistance program which provides food for those who need it. It operates as a central processing and distribution centre for the many food agencies it supports. The Food Bank relies on individual and corporate donations. Corporate donors include the Food Bank in their special purchases, one provision of which is that the Food Bank not sell the food it receives.
