= Waterloo Maple =

Software company in Canada

Coordinates: 43.5060°N 80.5478°W

Waterloo Maple Inc.
- Trade name: Maplesoft
- Company type: Private
- Industry: Symbolic Computation, Software, Technical Computing
- Founded: 20 April 1988 (Waterloo Maple Software); 3 March 2003 (Maplesoft)
- Founder: Keith Geddes and Gaston Gonnet
- Headquarters: Waterloo, Ontario, Canada
- Parent: Cybernet Systems Group
- Website: www.maplesoft.com

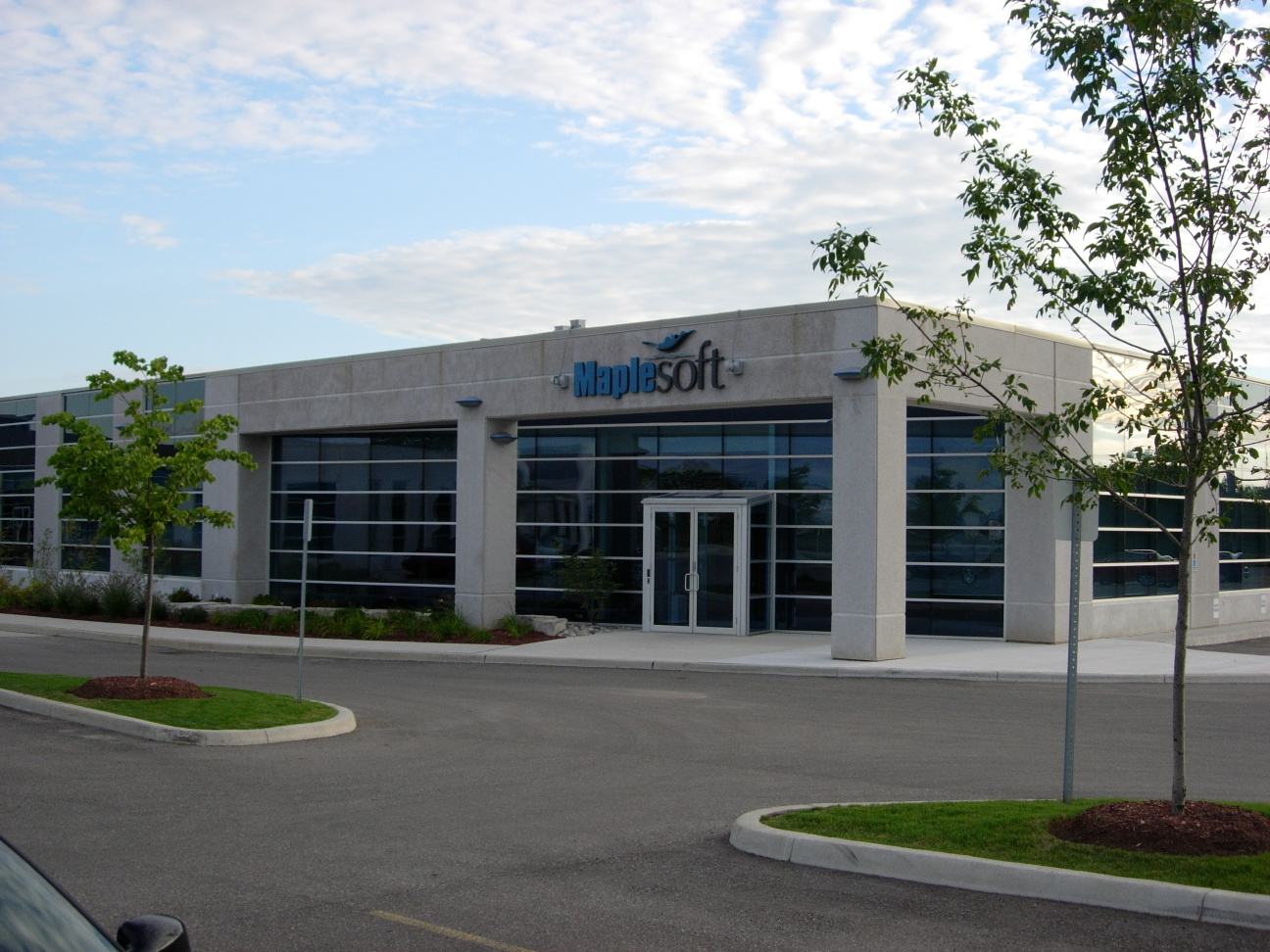
Maplesoft Corporate Headquarters

Waterloo Maple Inc. is a Canadian software company, headquartered in Waterloo, Ontario. It operates under the trade name Maplesoft. It is best known as the manufacturer of the Maple computer algebra system, and MapleSim physical modeling and simulation software.

== Corporate history ==
Waterloo Maple Inc. was first incorporated under the name Waterloo Maple Software in April 1988 by Keith Geddes and Gaston Gonnet, who were both then professors in the Symbolic Computation Group, a part of the computer science department (now the David R. Cheriton School of Computer Science) at the University of Waterloo.

Tim Bray served as the part-time CEO of Waterloo Maple Inc. from 1989-1990. During this period he claims in his resume that he helped save the company from one close encounter with bankruptcy by "instituting financial discipline".

Gonnet left the company in 1994 after a failed attempt to purchase a controlling stake despite already owning 30% of the shares, and following protracted disagreements over the management of the company sold his remaining share in 2001.

On April 20, 1998, Waterloo Maple Inc. announced its relocation to Seagram Museum in Waterloo, which was itself the former location of the original Seagram distillery.

On March 3, 2003, Waterloo Maple Inc. announced the immediate introduction of the name Maplesoft as its primary business name.

On May 27, 2003, Maplesoft announced relocating its headquarters to Waterloo Tech Campus at 615 Kumpf Drive, North Waterloo, and expected to begin operation at the relocated site on 2003-09-02.

On July 16, 2008, Maplesoft announced Cybernet Systems Taiwan was appointed as a Maplesoft Reseller for the Commercial and Government markets.

On July 30, 2009, Maplesoft announced it has signed a definitive agreement to be acquired by Cybernet Systems Co., Ltd. In 2009-07-31, Cybernet Systems Co., Ltd. announced its acquisitions of all outstanding shares of Waterloo Maple Inc., with transaction to be executed via Cybernet Holdings CANADA, Inc, with consolidation to be completed by 2009-09-01. As a result of this acquisition, 10% of the workforce at the time (around a dozen workers) lost their jobs.

On June 26, 2012, Maplesoft announced its entry to Modelica-based professional consulting services, which included model development and simulation services, analysis and tool development, real-time plant-model code generation, and training.

In June 2018, Maplesoft announced that it was spinning off its Möbius and Maple T.A. products to a new, independent company called DigitalEd.

On December 19, 2018, Maplesoft announced that Dr. Laurent Bernardin, COO and Chief Scientist has been appointed as new CEO and President of Maplesoft effective January 1, 2019. Dr. Bernardin succeeds former CEO, Jim Cooper who has moved to become the full-time CEO of DigitalEd, a company Maplesoft spun-off in early 2018. Dr. Bernardin was a student at ETH and was supervised by Prof. Gaston Gonnet, co-founder of Maplesoft.

== Subsidiaries ==
- Maplesoft France: Division based in Versailles, France. On January 20, 2015, Maplesoft announced the opening of its office in Paris, France.
- Maplesoft GmbH/Maplesoft Europe GmbH: Division based in Aachen, Germany. On March 30, 2010, Maplesoft announced the opening of its first office in Germany, replacing Scientific Computers as reseller in Germany and Austria. In 2011-02-15, the office was registered as Maplesoft Europe GmbH.
- Cybernet Systems Korea (가이아넷코리아주식회사)/Maplesoft Korea: A Maplesoft distributor in Korea. On July 15, 2012, Maplesoft announced the opening of Cybernet Systems Korea and Cybernet Systems Korea as the exclusive distributor Maplesoft products in Korea.
- Maplesoft Europe Limited: Division based in Cambridge, UK. On November 18, 2013, Maplesoft announced the opening of a new office in Cambridge, UK, which would act as the headquarters for Maplesoft's European operations, including offices in France and Germany. On January 14, 2016, Maplesoft announced a reseller agreement with EnginSoft, where EnginSoft would represent Maplesoft in the commercial markets in Germany, France, Italy, UK, Nordic, Spain, and Turkey.
- Maplesoft China: Division based in Shanghai, China. On February 20, 2019, Maplesoft announced the opening of a new and direct operation in China, jointly operated with its sister company Sigmetrix to replace their reseller Cybernet China.
- Maplesoft Japan: Division based in Tokyo, Japan. On February 12, 2020, Maplesoft announced the opening of a new and direct operation in Japan, replacing their parent company Cybernet System as reseller in Japanese market.

== Products ==
Product	Related Products	Version
Maple	Maple Add-Ons; BlockImporter; Global Optimization; Grid Computing; Quantum Chemistry Advanced Engineering Mathematics with Maple; Calculus Study Guide; Precalculus Study Guide; The Mathematics Survival Kit - Maple Edition	2025
MapleSim	MapleSim Add-Ons; MapleSim Connector; MapleSim Connector for LabVIEW and NI VeriStand Software; MapleSim Connector for dSPACE Software; MapleSim Control Design Toolbox; MapleSim Tire Component Library; MapleSim Driveline Component Library MapleSim Insight	2024
MapleNet	n/a	n/a
Maple Learn	n/a	Online
Maple Flow		2024

Information above taken from the official Maplesoft website.

== See also ==
- Maple (software)
- MapleSim
