= Alan Dale George =

Alan Dale George from the University of Florida, Gainesville, FL was named Fellow of the Institute of Electrical and Electronics Engineers (IEEE) in 2013 for contributions to reconfigurable and high-performance computing.
