= J. Alan George =

Canadian computer scientist

J. Alan George, FRSC (born November 9, 1943) is a computer scientist and university administrator.

In the academic world, George is best known for his intensive research and wide-ranging contributions to the field of numerical linear algebra, specifically computation with sparse matrices. He is the author or coauthor of more than 100 research articles and two books, and co-editor of two other books. With his students, he has developed a widely used mathematical software package (SPARSPAK) for solving sparse systems of equations and sparse least squares problems.

He is also well known at the University of Waterloo for having served in a number of senior administrative positions, notably vice-president, provost, and dean of mathematics.

== Education ==
George received a BSc and MSc from the University of Alberta in 1964 and 1966 respectively, and a PhD from Stanford University in 1971. His doctoral thesis was entitled Computer Implementation of the Finite Element Method and his supervisor was George Forsythe.

== Administrative service ==
He served as dean of the Faculty of Mathematics at the University of Waterloo from 1980 to 1986. From 1986 to 1988 he held the position of distinguished scientist at the Oak Ridge National Laboratory and university professor of mathematics and computer science at the University of Tennessee at Knoxville. He held the position of vice-president, academic and provost from 1988 until June 30, 1993. He again served as dean of mathematics from December 3, 1997, to June 30, 2005. He served as interim vice-president, academic and provost at the university from January through August 2001, and interim vice-president, university research from January 2006 through June 2007. He is currently associate provost, information systems and technology at UW, a position he has held since July, 2003, and also has been serving as interim dean of graduate studies since October 2007.

His name has been given to an award, the J. Alan George Award, given by Waterloo's undergraduate Mathematics Society to an undergraduate completing studies in the Faculty of Mathematics who has shown exemplary service to student life during the duration of his or her studies.

== Controversy ==
In 1989, George attracted some attention for his decision, as Provost, to bar the Internet newsgroup rec.humor.funny from Waterloo's news service.

From 1991 to 1993, he was involved in a dispute ("the Edmonds affair") with the University of Waterloo and Jack Edmonds.

In 2000, his decision to override a professor's assigned marks for a calculus class resulted in considerable news coverage on campus and a formal arbitration between the university and the professor concerned.

== Other ==
He has been a consultant to various companies and government agencies in Canada, the United States, and Britain, and serves or has served on advisory or governing boards for numerous academic institutions and research institutes.

He is a Fellow of the Institute for Electrical and Electronics Engineers (IEEE), a Fellow of the Institute for Mathematics and its Applications (UK), and a Fellow of the Royal Society of Canada.

== See also ==
- List of University of Waterloo people
