= Gender power gap =

Gender inequality measurement

The gender power gap is defined as the proportional power held by women in leadership and management positions relative to men (such as the gap in top executive positions). This measurement distinguishes itself from gender diversity, which only measures the presence of women at the top table. Instead, gender power gap specifically focuses on the value and number of top executive women, who hold decision-making power and authority in the institutions they work for. Executive positions held by women, typically as chief human resources officer, tend to have a fraction of the authority of male executives. Similarly in politics, women tend to be assigned roles which deal with family and other social issues, whereas men are assigned to tackle economic and structural developmental challenges. According to UN secretary general, Antonio Guterres, who coined the term, the gender power gap that exists in societies, cultures and political systems is also present in economies and corporations.

According to a 2015 UN report, women tend to have leverage only in a minority of decision-making roles in both the private and public sectors. A separate study in 2022, led by Professor Andreas Hoepner of the graduate business school at the University of Dublin, found that while women accounted for a quarter of top executive decision-making positions at S&P 500 companies, they controlled only 1 percent of the value of shares held among their fellow corporate leaders. The Inter-Parliamentary Union (IPU) and UN Women found in January 2023, when compiling the map "Women in Politics", that at the global level, gender parity in political decision making and leadership roles, in spite of improvements, is still a very distant goal.

== History ==
The term gender power gap was coined in March 2020 by António Guterres, Secretary-General of the United Nations, when he stated that the gender pay gap is "just a symptom of the gender power gap". Guterres argued the gender imbalance between men and women exists because "gender equality is fundamentally a question of power". He proclaimed "centuries of discrimination and deep-rooted patriarchy have created a yawning gender power gap in our economies, our political systems, and our corporations", and expressed how women are "still excluded from the top table, from governments and prestigious award ceremonies, and corporate boards". In other words, it comes down to an imbalance in the amount of power men and women possess.

The Canadian publication The Globe and Mail echoed Guterres' view in its 2021 "Power Gap" series, which analysed hundreds of public sector salary records. The series found that women are consistently "outnumbered, outranked, and out-earned" by men in management positions across various institutions, including universities, and public corporations. Of the 171 organisations that disclosed full workplace data, The Globe and Mail found men outnumbered women at 84% and out-earned women on average 68% of the time.

== Statistics ==
=== Corporate ===
The gender power gap webinar hosted by gender data company ExecuShe and UN Women's Women's Empowerment Principles, highlighted that certain executive positions hold more power than others. For example, a CEO from a technology company typically holds 56% of decision-making power, while the CFO holds 12%, the CTO and CBO hold 11%, and the CHRO holds only 4%. Women are more likely to hold CHRO positions, further contributing to the gender power gap. The webinar also found that on average, women executives hold just 10.7% of power in G20 companies, despite representing 15.9% of executive positions. Some countries, such as Australia (21.2%), South Africa (19.8%), and Canada (16.7%), fare better than others in terms of the gender power gap. Countries like Argentina (3.9%), South Korea (2.1%), and Saudi Arabia (1.8%) were found to have the lowest gender power gap figures.

Further research with The Female Lead revealed 292 companies in the S&P 500 placed less than 10% of the value of corporate stock in women's hands. The full list of women shareholders included notable names such as:

- Jayshree Ullal, President and CEO of Arista Networks;
- Sheryl Sandberg, former COO of Meta Platforms;
- Lisa Su, President, CEO and Chair of Advanced Micro Devices;
- Ruth Porat, SVP and CFO of Alphabet; and
- Phebe Novakovic, Chair and CEO of General Dynamics.

=== Political ===
The UN Women report says global percentage of female MPs marginally increased to 26.5% from 25.5% in 2021, whereas percentage of female Speakers of Parliament marginally improved to 22.7% from 20.9% in 2021. The report indicates wide regional disparity, such as female MPs in European Nordic countries constitute 45.7% of the legislative whole, whereas in the Middle East and North Africa region just 17.7% of MPs are women.

Only 13 countries have 50% or more cabinet level ministers, Nicaragua (62.5%), Chile (62.5%), Mozambique (55%), Andorra (50%), Colombia (50%); Germany, Netherlands, Norway (50% each), Belgium (57.1%), Liechtenstein (60%), Spain (63.6%), Finland (64.3%), leading with Albania (66.7%). There are 17 other countries having women's representation among Cabinet Ministers between 40 and 49.9%. Of these, nine states are in Europe, but nine countries — mainly from Oceania and West Asia — do not have any female representation among their cabinet members heading ministries. At the global level, as of 1 January 2023, only 22.8% of Cabinet Ministers in Europe, 31.6% in North America, and 30.1% in Latin America and the Caribbean were women. These numbers were atypical, as for example representation in Cabinet ministerial level drops to 10.1% in Central and Southern Asia and 8.1% in the Pacific Islands (Oceania excluding Australia and New Zealand).

The power gap is also maintained by women being limited to certain portfolios. Women tend to lead policy areas related to gender equality, human rights, and social affairs, family and children affairs, social inclusion and development, social protection and social security, indigenous and minority affairs. The report says that the data indicates women tend to hold about 30% of the representation in public administration, education, and the environment, but men continue to dominate crucial policy areas like economics, defence, justice, and home affairs portfolios. Female cabinet ministers constitute 12% in defence and local government portfolios, 11% in energy, natural resource fuels, and mining portfolios, and 8% in transport portfolio. According to UN Women 2023 report, only 17 (11.3%) out of 151 countries (monarchy-based systems excluded) have female Heads of State and 19 female Heads of Governments (9.8%) amongst 193 countries.

=== United Nations ===
Alexandra Topping of The Guardian references a report on women's leadership within the multilateral system, which highlights the persistent gender power gap that has existed since the establishment of the United Nations. Topping points out that out of 78 Presidents of the United Nations General Assembly, all but 4 were male. Furthermore, the UN has never selected a woman as Secretary-General since its inception in 1946. Women's representation among permanent representatives to the UN stands at just 24%. Among 33 of the most prominent UN institutions, women have had the opportunity to lead just 12% of the time. Only one third of multilateral organisations were ever led by a woman, and 13 institutions, including the four largest development banks, have never had a woman in a leadership role.

== See also ==
- Gender gap
- Gender inequality
- Gender pay gap
- Gender representation on corporate boards of directors
- Gender role
- Global Gender Gap Report
- Gender quota
- List of elected and appointed female heads of state and government
- Marriage bar
- Maternal wall
- Occupational sexism
- Sexism in academia
- Sexism in the technology industry

== Bibliography ==
- Groysberg, Boris, and Ammerman, Colleen. Glass Half-Broken: Shattering the Barriers That Still Hold Women Back at Work. United States, Harvard Business Review Press. 2021.
- Julios, Christina. Sexual Harassment in the UK Parliament: Lessons from the #MeToo Era. Switzerland, Springer International Publishing, 2022.
- Tracey E. George, Mitu Gulati, and Albert Yoon, Gender, Credentials, and M&A, 48 BYU L. Rev. 723 (2023). Available at: https://digitalcommons.law.byu.edu/lawreview/vol48/iss3/5
