= MQX =

Real-time operating system

Message Queue eXecutive (MQX)
- Developer: Dy4 Systems, Inc. Precise Software Technologies, Inc. ARC International; Synopsys, Inc. Embedded Access, Inc. Freescale
- Working state: Current
- Source model: Closed source
- Initial release: 1991; 35 years ago
- Latest release: 5.3 / January 2026; 9 months ago
- Marketing target: Embedded systems: industrial, medical, consumer
- Available in: C, assembly language (ASM)
- Supported platforms: Kinetis, ColdFire, PowerPC, ARC, ARM, StrongARM, xScale
- Kernel type: Microkernel RTOS
- License: Proprietary
- Preceded by: MPX (renamed Harmony)
- Official website: www.nxp.com/design/software/embedded-software/mqx-software-solutions:MQX_HOME

MQX (Message Queue eXecutive) is a real-time operating system (RTOS) developed by Precise Software Technologies, Inc., and currently sold by Synopsys, Embedded Access, Inc., and NXP Semiconductors.

Like most RTOSs, MQX includes a multitasking kernel with pre-emptive scheduling and fast interrupt response, extensive inter-process communication and synchronization facilities, and a file system.

Its configurable size conserves memory space using as little as 6 KB of ROM, including its kernel, interrupts, semaphores, queues, and a memory manager.

MQX includes a TCP/IP stack (RTCS), embedded FAT-based file system (MFS), USB host/device stack, and design, task-aware debugging (TAD), remote debugging, and performance analysis tools. It is supported by popular SSL/TLS libraries, such as wolfSSL, for increased security.

MQX is generally used in embedded systems. MQX development is performed on a host machine running Unix or Windows, which cross-compiles target software to run on various target CPU architectures.

MQX has been ported to many platforms and now runs on most modern CPUs used in the embedded market, including Kinetis, ColdFire, PowerPC, ARC, ARM, StrongARM, xScale.

All new Kinetis (ARM Cortex-M4), i.MX RT (ARM Cortex-M7), and ColdFire devices will be enabled with complementary Freescale MQX RTOS. Freescale plans to expand the availability of this complementary integrated enablement software to include many embedded processors in its portfolio.

== History ==
MQX had its origins at Dy4 Systems, Inc., a company based in Ottawa, Canada. In 1984, a small team of software engineers there, consisting of Jeremy James, Mati Sauks, and Craig Honegger started researching novel applications for embedded multiprocessors. This work led to the use of a real-time operating system in writing firmware for Dy4 single board computers. In 1989, James and Sauks commercialized the Harmony RTOS, under the name MPX, which was developed for portable multiprocessor real-time computing systems by the National Research Council Canada, and created a company named Precise Software Technologies, Inc.

This effort led to the development of the Precise Real-Time Executive technology that was the basis of a product named MQX and MQX+m, which were real-time executives for single processor and multiprocessor applications. The unique asynchronous message passing paradigm delivered by MQX when it was introduced in 1991 and the royalty-free licensing model were accepted immediately in the embedded real-time market. Since the introduction of MQX, Precise continually added functionality to the MQX RTOS69 through its various iterations and versions.

Precise Software Technologies was acquired by ARC International in March, 2000 and continued to develop, license and sell MQX on many new processor architectures including Freescale ColdFire, IBM/Freescale PowerPC and ARM. In 2004, Embedded Access assumed distribution and support of the MQX RTOS on non-ARC processor architectures. In 2009, Freescale began shipping the MQX RTOS complimentary with selected ColdFire MCUs.

MQX has been used in thousands of embedded projects by over 1,000 companies, who have shipped millions of products running it. Today, companies such as ABB, Agilent, ATI Technologies, Baoruh Electronic, Bausch and Lomb, General Dynamics, Daewoo, Exabyte, General Electric, B.F. Goodrich, Liebert, Matrox, Mitel Networks, Philips, Porsche, QLogic, SICK, Sony, Tyco, and Xerox use MQX in applications such as industrial control, networking, storage, and consumer electronics.
