= W. Morven Gentleman =

Canadian computer scientist (1942–2018)

- Born: William Morven Gentleman; July 6, 1942; Calgary, Alberta, Canada
- Died: December 13, 2018 (aged 76)
- Education: McGill University (BSc); Princeton University (PhD)
- Known for: Work on the fast Fourier transform; Harmony operating system
- Awards: CS-Can/Info-Can Lifetime Achievement Award (2019)
- Scientific career
- Fields: Numerical analysis, operating systems, software engineering
- Workplaces: Bell Labs; National Physical Laboratory; University of Waterloo; National Research Council Canada; Dalhousie University
- Thesis: Robust Estimation of Multivariate Location by Minimizing pth Power Deviations (1966)
- Doctoral advisor: John Tukey

William Morven Gentleman (July 6, 1942 – December 13, 2018) was a Canadian computer scientist. He worked on numerical and statistical computation, operating systems and software engineering. With Gordon Sande he wrote an early paper on the fast Fourier transform, presented in 1966, which included an analysis of the method's accuracy. He was the first director of the Mathematics Faculty Computing Facility at the University of Waterloo. At the National Research Council Canada he led the team that developed the Harmony operating system. CS-Can/Info-Can gave him its Lifetime Achievement Award for 2019, after his death.

== Early life and education ==
Gentleman was born in Calgary, Alberta, on July 6, 1942. He was the third of four children of Scottish parents. The family moved to Lethbridge, where he went to school. As a boy he built model aircraft, and while in high school he won an award as the top air cadet in Canada. According to his Dalhousie obituary, he had hoped to study aeronautical engineering, but the timing was against him (Avro Arrow program had just been cancelled). He studied mathematical physics at McGill University in Montreal instead, and graduated with a Bachelor of Science degree in 1963.

He went on to Princeton University with a Woodrow Wilson scholarship. He received a PhD in mathematics in 1966. His supervisor was John Tukey. (Note: The Dalhousie obituary gives 1965 for the doctorate. The Princeton Alumni Weekly, the Princeton University Library catalogue and the Mathematics Genealogy Project give 1966. So does a profile of him that IBM published in 2005.) His thesis was titled Robust Estimation of Multivariate Location by Minimizing pth Power Deviations.

== Career ==
=== Bell Labs and the National Physical Laboratory ===
Gentleman joined Bell Labs in Murray Hill, New Jersey, in 1965. He then spent a year at the National Physical Laboratory in Teddington, England. There he worked with the numerical analyst James H. Wilkinson.

=== University of Waterloo ===
In July 1969 Gentleman became an assistant professor at the University of Waterloo. He joined the Department of Applied Analysis and Computer Science, which later became the David R. Cheriton School of Computer Science. He was later also a member of the Department of Statistics, and he was promoted to associate professor. From 1974 to 1976 he was associate chair of the computer science department.

In 1974 he was part of a team of faculty and students that wrote a version of the APL programming language for Honeywell 6000 series computers. The university gave it to Honeywell in exchange for $250,000 worth of equipment for its own Honeywell 6050.

Gentleman was the first director of the Mathematics Faculty Computing Facility (MFCF). There he set up the Software Development Group, in which many people who later worked in the Canadian computing industry were trained. The facility was meant to support teaching, research and software development of use to industry. CS-Can/Info-Can called this plan "unique for its time". In 1980 he was appointed University Computing Officer. In that post he kept in contact with every unit on campus that used computers, and he advised the vice-president, academic, on computing.

The Mathematics Genealogy Project lists five doctoral students of Gentleman at Waterloo, who finished between 1973 and 1983.

The Maple computer algebra system was started at Waterloo late in 1980. Michael Monagan's history of the system names Bruce Char, Keith Geddes, Gentleman and Gaston Gonnet as the four professors who decided to build it. Gonnet recalled that Geddes, Gentleman and he were the main people in the project at its start. He said that Gentleman was interested in the design of the system more than in computer algebra, and that for a long time Gentleman gave the group ideas and tested the system. Gentleman had some experience with ALTRAN, an algebra system from Bell Labs. He was also among those who expected B, the language first chosen for Maple, to be portable to many other computers. He was a co-author of the first paper on Maple, which was presented in 1983 and set out the design of the system.

=== National Research Council ===
In the early 1980s Gentleman moved to the National Research Council (NRC) in Ottawa. (Note: The sources give three dates. The Dalhousie obituary says that he moved to the NRC in 1982. CS-Can/Info-Can gives 1969–1983 for his post at Waterloo and 1983–2000 for his post at the NRC. The University of Waterloo says that he left the university in June 1984.) He directed its Software Engineering Laboratory and led the team that developed the Harmony operating system. He was also director of the Consortium for Graduate Studies in Software Engineering (ConGESE). With Jacob Slonim he led the founding of the Consortium for Software Engineering Research (CSER), which included universities from across Canada. CSER was set up in 1996 with funding from the Natural Sciences and Engineering Research Council.

Gentleman sat on many boards and committees that supervised or reviewed Canadian research programs and proposals, in particular joint projects of universities and industry. He was a member of Working Group 2.5, on numerical software, of the International Federation for Information Processing.

=== Dalhousie University ===
In 2000 Gentleman joined the Faculty of Computer Science at Dalhousie University in Halifax, Nova Scotia. He was a professor and the director of the new Global Information Networking Institute (GINI). He also taught a course in industrial engineering. Srini Sampalli, a colleague in the faculty, recalled that Gentleman worked on its first large successful proposal to the Canada Foundation for Innovation, which paid for major infrastructure. He also recalled that Gentleman had an important part in developing the curriculum for the courses on software architecture. He retired in 2008 and kept in touch with students for many years afterwards.

== Research ==
According to a profile that IBM published in 2005, Gentleman had published on operating systems, real-time systems and compilers, on numerical analysis, signal processing, computer algebra and complexity theory, and on computer architecture and robotics. The profile says that software engineering had been his main interest for some time. It adds that he had been responsible for delivering commercial software products.

=== Fast Fourier transform ===
Gentleman's first publication was a paper on the fast Fourier transform (FFT), written with Gordon Sande. Tukey had outlined the method in a course at Princeton in the spring of 1963. Sande, then a graduate student, wrote an FFT program and a paper. He withdrew the paper when he learned that James Cooley and Tukey had already submitted theirs. Gentleman and Sande presented a joint paper at the Fall Joint Computer Conference in 1966. Cooley and Tukey later called it "excellent and comprehensive". They wrote that it covered Sande's form of the algorithm and his methods for computing correlations. It also gave an error analysis of the kind used by Wilkinson, which showed that the FFT gained in accuracy in the same ratio as it gained in speed. The paper further showed how very large transforms could be computed with a small fast memory and auxiliary storage. Cooley and Tukey wrote in 1993 that these methods were still in use on supercomputers.

=== Quadrature and matrix computations ===
Clenshaw–Curtis quadrature, a method of numerical integration, was published in 1960, before the FFT was introduced. Lloyd N. Trefethen credits Gentleman with pointing out the connection between the two, in a pair of papers of 1972.

A Givens rotation is a basic operation of numerical linear algebra. It is a plane rotation that sets a chosen entry of a matrix to zero. In 1973 Gentleman published "Least squares computations by Givens transformations without square roots". That paper, and a note by Sven Hammarling in 1974, showed how the computation could be rearranged so that fewer arithmetic operations are needed to apply a rotation to the remaining columns of the matrix. The rearranged form is known as the modified Givens transformation. It halves the number of multiplications needed for that step.

With H. T. Kung, Gentleman wrote "Matrix triangularization by systolic arrays" (1981). A systolic array is a regular arrangement of many simple processing cells. Kung's 1982 survey of such designs cites the paper as an example of a two-dimensional systolic array. It also cites it for a chain of arrays that gives the least-squares fit to all the data received up to any given moment.

=== Message passing and operating systems ===
CS-Can/Info-Can traces Gentleman's work on message passing to his interest in portable software, which can be moved easily from one kind of computer to another. Thoth, an operating system used at Waterloo, allowed fast message passing between processes, with little overhead for each process. Gentleman's 1981 paper "Message passing between sequential processes: the reply primitive and the administrator concept" described how interactive and real-time programs written with Thoth were organized. Harmony, written at the NRC, was a descendant of Thoth. It passed messages quickly between processes on a multiprocessor system. Both systems used a small set of message-passing operations for communication between processes and for input and output.

In the 2005 profile Gentleman wrote that research by one person can achieve only so much. He said that he had been lucky to take part in many team projects, and he named Multics, Unix, Thoth and Harmony.

== Recognition ==
In 2005 IBM Canada honoured Gentleman as one of the Pioneers of Computing in Canada. He was one of 90 people on the list of honourees. The honours were given at CASCON 2005, a conference sponsored by IBM's laboratory in Toronto. The programme is dated October 19, 2005. Those chosen had to be academic pioneers who had spent a large part of their careers at a Canadian university. They also had to hold a PhD awarded in 1972 or earlier. Gentleman was himself a member of the nominating committee.

Gentleman was one of the winners of the Lifetime Achievement Award for 2019 of CS-Can/Info-Can, a Canadian computer science organization. The citation says that his work joined new techniques based on theory with close attention to the practical details that decide whether they can be used. It also credits him with helping to improve the Canadian software industry and to keep university and industry researchers working together.

After his death a Morven Gentleman Memorial Scholarship Fund was opened at Dalhousie University.

== Personal life and death ==
Gentleman had a wife, Katherine, with whom he had two daughters. Gentleman died on December 13, 2018, at the age of 76.

== Selected publications ==
- Gentleman, W. M.; Sande, G. (1966). "Fast Fourier transforms – for fun and profit". Proceedings of the November 7–10, 1966, Fall Joint Computer Conference. AFIPS Conference Proceedings. Vol. 29. pp. 563–578. doi:10.1145/1464291.1464352.
- Gentleman, W. Morven (1972). "Implementing Clenshaw-Curtis quadrature, I: methodology and experience". Communications of the ACM. 15 (5): 337–342. doi:10.1145/355602.361310.
- Gentleman, W. Morven (1972). "Implementing Clenshaw-Curtis quadrature, II: computing the cosine transformation". Communications of the ACM. 15 (5): 343–346. doi:10.1145/355602.361311.
- Gentleman, W. Morven (1973). "Least squares computations by Givens transformations without square roots". Journal of the Institute of Mathematics and Its Applications. 12 (3): 329–336. doi:10.1093/imamat/12.3.329.
- Gentleman, W. M.; Johnson, S. C. (1976). "Analysis of algorithms, a case study: determinants of matrices with polynomial entries". ACM Transactions on Mathematical Software. 2 (3): 232–241. doi:10.1145/355694.355696.
- Gentleman, W. Morven (1978). "Some complexity results for matrix computations on parallel processors". Journal of the ACM. 25 (1): 112–115. doi:10.1145/322047.322057.
- Gentleman, W. Morven (1981). "Message passing between sequential processes: the reply primitive and the administrator concept". Software: Practice and Experience. 11 (5): 435–466. doi:10.1002/spe.4380110504.
- Gentleman, W. M.; Kung, H. T. (1981). "Matrix triangularization by systolic arrays". Real-Time Signal Processing IV. Proceedings of SPIE. Vol. 298. pp. 19–26. doi:10.1117/12.932507.
- Char, Bruce W.; Geddes, Keith O.; Gentleman, W. Morven; Gonnet, Gaston H. (1983). "The design of Maple: a compact, portable, and powerful computer algebra system". In van Hulzen, J. A. (ed.). Computer Algebra: EUROCAL '83. Lecture Notes in Computer Science. Vol. 162. Berlin: Springer. pp. 101–115. doi:10.1007/3-540-12868-9_95.

== Sources ==
- Association of Princeton Graduate Alumni (June 5, 2019). "W. Morven Gentleman *66". Memorials. Princeton Alumni Weekly.
- Cooley, James W.; Tukey, John W. (December 20–27, 1993). "On the Origin and Publication of the FFT Paper" (PDF). This Week's Citation Classic. Current Contents: Physical, Chemical & Earth Sciences. 33 (51–52): 8–9.
- "W. Morven Gentleman". CS-Can/Info-Can. n.d.a.
- "Past Winners". CS-Can/Info-Can. n.d.b.
- "In Memoriam – Dr. W. Morven Gentleman". Faculty of Computer Science. Dalhousie University. December 17, 2018a. Archived from the original on October 14, 2019.
- "In Memoriam: Dr. W. Morven Gentleman". Faculty of Engineering. Dalhousie University. December 18, 2018b. The same text was sent as a Dalhousie University notice on December 17, 2018, and is kept in the university's repository: hdl:10222/81422.
- Gonnet, Gaston (March 16–18, 2005). "An interview with Gaston Gonnet" (PDF) (Interview). Interviewed by Thomas Haigh. Zurich: Society for Industrial and Applied Mathematics – via Computer History Museum.
- Hanson, Richard J.; Hopkins, Tim (March 2004). "Algorithm 830: Another Visit with Standard and Modified Givens Transformations and a Remark on Algorithm 539". ACM Transactions on Mathematical Software. 30 (1): 86–94. doi:10.1145/974781.974786. An authors' preprint with its own page numbers, 1–9, is at the University of Kent.
- Pioneers of Computing 2005: Honouring Those Who Influenced the History of Computing in Canada (PDF) (Event programme). IBM Centers for Advanced Studies. October 19, 2005.
- "Membership of IFIP Working Group 2.5 on Numerical Software". IFIP Working Group 2.5. September 23, 2025.
- Kung, H. T. (January 1982). "Why Systolic Architectures?" (PDF). Computer. 15 (1): 37–46. doi:10.1109/MC.1982.1653825.
- "William Morven Gentleman". Mathematics Genealogy Project. n.d.
- Monagan, Michael (November 22, 2025). "A History of Efficiency Problems in Maple" (PDF) (Preprint). Simon Fraser University.
- "Robust estimation of multivariate location by minimizing PTH power deviations". Princeton University Library Catalog. n.d.
- "History of Maple". Symbolic Computation Group. University of Waterloo. March 1993.
- Tanner, Peter P.; Buxton, William A. S. (1985). "Some Issues in Future User Interface Management System (UIMS) Development". In Pfaff, G. (ed.). User Interface Management Systems. Berlin: Springer-Verlag. pp. 67–79.
- Trefethen, Lloyd N. (2008). "Is Gauss Quadrature Better than Clenshaw–Curtis?" (PDF). SIAM Review. 50 (1): 67–87. doi:10.1137/060659831.
- "In memoriam: Morven Gentleman". Cheriton School of Computer Science. University of Waterloo. December 18, 2018.
