= Microsystems Technology Office =

US Research Organization

The Microsystems Technology Office (MTO) is one of seven current organizational divisions of DARPA, an agency responsible for the development of new technology for the United States Armed Forces. It is sometimes referred to as the Microelectronics Technology Office.

The office focuses on the development of microelectromechanical systems (MEMS), electronics, algorithms, systems architecture, and photonics.

== History ==
MTO was established by Arati Prabhakar. It is currently led by Director Dr. Whitney Mason.

== Projects ==
A detailed description of each project is available on the DARPA/MTO website

- Adaptive radar Countermeasures (ARC) https://www.darpa.mil/program/adaptive-radar-countermeasures
- Adaptive Focal Plane Array (AFPA)
- Adaptive RF Technologies (ART) https://www.darpa.mil/program/adaptive-rf-technologies
- Advanced Wide FOV Architectures for Image Reconstruction and Exploitation (AWARE) https://www.darpa.mil/program/advanced-wide-fov-architectures-for-image-reconstruction-and-exploitation
- Advanced X-Ray Integrated Sources (AXiS)
- Analog Logic (AL)
- Analog-to-Information (A-TO-I) Look Through
- Architecture for Diode High Energy Laser Systems (ADHELS)
- Black Diamond
- Carbon Electronics for RF Applications (CERA)
- Casimir Effect Enhancement (CEE)
- Centers in Integrated Photonics Engineering Research (CIPHER)
- Chip to Chip Optical Interconnects (C2OI)
- Chip-Scale Atomic Clocks (CSAC)
- Chip-Scale Vacuum Micro Pumps (CSVMP)
- Compact Mid-Ultraviolet Technology (CMUVT)
- Compact Ultra-Stable Gyro for Absolute Reference (COUGAR)
- DARPA/ONR Field-Reversible Thermal Connector (RevCon) Challenge
- Data in Optical Domain Network (DOD-N)
- Dialysis-Like Therapeutics (DLT)
- Discharge Excited Catalytic Oxygen Iodine Laser (DECOIL)
- Diverse Accessible Heterogeneous Integration (DAHI) https://www.darpa.mil/program/diverse-accessible-heterogeneous-integration
- Dynamic Range-enhanced Electronics and Materials (DREaM) https://www.darpa.mil/program/dynamic-range-enhanced-electronics-and-materials
- Efficient Linearized All-Silicon Transmitter ICs (ELASTx)
- Electric Field Detector (E-FED)
- EXCALIBUR https://www.darpa.mil/program/excalibur
- Focus Center Research Program (FCRP)
- Gratings of Regular Arrays and Trim Exposures (GRATE)
- Guaranteed Architecture for Physical Security (GAPS)
- Hemispherical Array Detector for Imaging (HARDI)
- High Frequency Integrated Vacuum Electronics (HIFIVE)
- High Operating Temperature Mid Wave Infrared (HOTMWIR)
- High Productivity Computing Systems (HPCS)
- Hybrid Insect Micro-Electro-Mechanical Systems (Hi-MEMS)
- In Vivo Nanoplatforms (IVN)
- Integrity and Reliability of Integrated Circuits (IRIS)
- Intrachip/Interchip Enhanced Cooling (ICECool) https://www.darpa.mil/program/intrachip-interchip-enhanced-cooling
- Leading Edge Access Program (LEAP)
- Living Foundries
- Low Cost Thermal Imager (LCTI-M) https://www.darpa.mil/program/low-cost-thermal-imager-manufacturing
- Maskless Nanowriter
- Mesodynamic Architectures (Meso)
- Micro Cryogenic Coolers (MCC)
- Micro Isotope Power Sources (MIPS)
- Microscale Plasma Devices (MPD)
- Micro-Technology for Positioning, Navigation and Timing (Micro-PNT)
- Nano Electro Mechanical Computers (NEMS)
- Nanoscale Architecture for Coherent Hyper-Optic Sources (NACHOS)
- NEMS MEMS Science and Technology Fundamentals
- Nitride Electronic NeXt-Generation Technology (NEXT)
- Non Volatile Logic (NV LOGIC)
- Optical Radiation Cooling and Heating in Integrated Devices (ORCHID)
- Photon Counting Arrays (PCAR)
- Photonically Optimized Embedded Microprocessors (POEM) https://www.darpa.mil/program/photonically-optimized-embedded-microprocessors
- Power Efficiency Revolution for Embedded Computing Technologies (PERFECT) https://www.darpa.mil/program/power-efficiency-revolution-for-embedded-computing-technologies
- Quantum Entanglement Science and Technology (QUEST)
- Reliable Neural-Interface Technology (RE-NET)
- RF Photonic Technologies (RPT)
- Self HEALing Mixed Signal Integrated Circuits (HEALICS)
- Sensor Tape
- Short-Range, Wide Field-of-View Extremely agile, Electronically Steered Photonic Emitter (SWEEPER)
- Spin Torque Transfer Random Access Memory (STT-RAM)
- Thermal Management Technologies (TMT)
- THz Electronics
- Tip Based Nanofabrication (TBN)
- Trusted Integrated Circuits (TRUST)
- Ubiquitous High Performance Computing (UHPC)
- Ultrabeam
