= Jayshree Ullal =

Indian-American chief executive (born 1961)

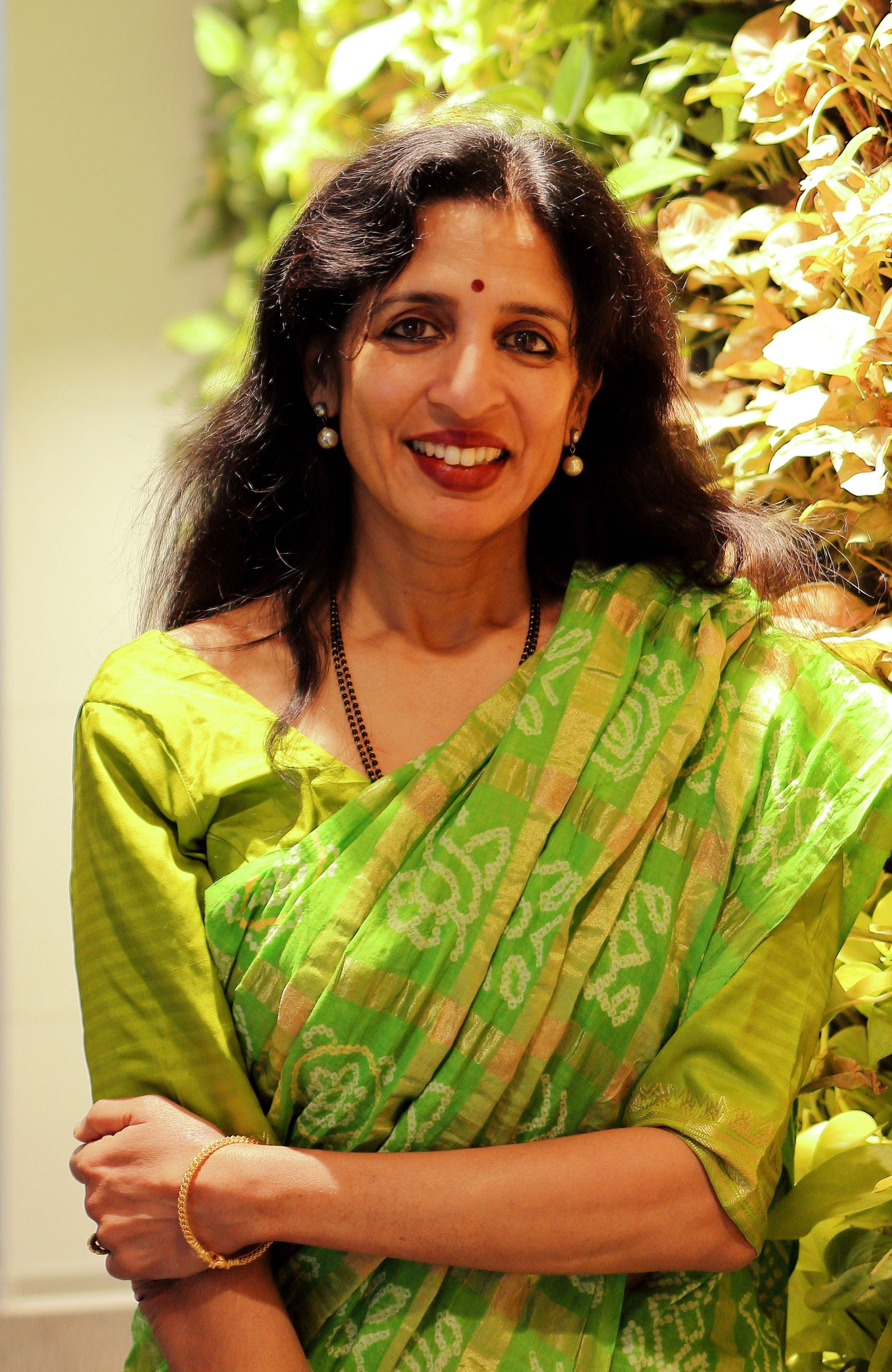
- Ullal in 2014
- Born: March 27, 1961 (age 65); London, England
- Education: San Francisco State University (B.S.); Santa Clara University (M.S.)
- Occupations: CEO and Chairperson, Arista Networks
- Spouse: Vijay Ullal
- Children: 2 daughters
- Website: arista.com

Jayshree V. Ullal (born March 27, 1961) is a Indian-American billionaire businesswoman, chairperson and CEO of Arista Networks, a cloud networking company responsible for the deployment of Gigabit Ethernet in AI and data centers.

== Early life and education ==
Ullal was born on March 27, 1961, in London into a Hindu family of Indian origin. Her father was a physicist who worked for India's Ministry of Education. She grew up in New Delhi, India, and was schooled at Convent of Jesus and Mary, Delhi.

She attended San Francisco State University, where she graduated with a B.S. in electrical engineering in 1981. She went on to Santa Clara University where she received an M.S. in Engineering Management and Leadership in 1986.

== Career ==
=== Early career ===
Ullal began her career as a senior strategic development engineer at Fairchild Semiconductor and later joined Advanced Micro Devices (AMD), where she designed high-speed memory chips for IBM and Hitachi. In 1988 she joined Ungermann-Bass, where she was director of the company's internetworking business unit.

In March 1992, Ullal joined Crescendo Communications, a maker of Fiber Distributed Data Interface (FDDI) network products, as vice-president of marketing. She helped pioneer 100-Mbit/s Copper Distributed Data Interface (CDDI) products and worked on first-generation Ethernet switching.

=== Cisco ===
In September 1993, Cisco Systems acquired Crescendo Communications, marking Cisco's first acquisition and first foray into the switching market. Ullal thereby joined Cisco and began work on the Cisco Catalyst switching business, which grew from its beginning in 1993 to a $5 billion business in 2000. As vice president and general manager of LAN switching in the Enterprise group, Ullal initiated strategic initiatives such as unified communications, IP telephony, content networking and policy networking. She oversaw some 20 mergers and acquisitions for Cisco in the enterprise sector.

By 2005 she became Senior Vice President of the Data Center, Switching and Security Technology Group. Responsibilities included the direction of the modular Nexus and Catalyst Data Center Switching and Application/Virtualization services which saw about $15 billion of direct and indirect revenue. Ullal's career at Cisco spanned more than 15 years.

=== Arista ===
In October 2008, co-founders Andy Bechtolsheim and David Cheriton named Ullal CEO & President of Arista Networks, a cloud networking company located in Santa Clara, CA.

Ullal has worked on the deployment of 10/25/40/50/100/400/800/1.6T Gigabit Ethernet technology.

Ullal was named by Forbes as "one of the top five most influential people in the networking industry today" for her work at Arista.

In June 2014, Ullal led Arista to an IPO on the New York Stock Exchange under the symbol ANET.

Ullal was named one of Barron's “World's Best CEOs” in 2018. She was named one of Fortune's “Top 20 Business persons” in 2019.

Ullal was named on the Fortune Most Powerful Women 2026 list.

== Personal life ==
She is married to Vijay Ullal. They have two daughters and live in Saratoga, California. Vijay Ullal, now a venture capitalist and investor, was president and chief operating officer of Fairchild Semiconductor from September 2012, until November 2014. She is also the sister of the late Saratoga City councilwoman Susie Nagpal, who has a surviving son and daughter. Forbes estimates that Ullal owns about 5% of Arista's stock, some of which is earmarked for her two children, niece and nephew.
