= Remedy Debugger =

Embedded system level debugger

The Remedy debugger was the first embedded system level debugger in the world. It offered many features that users take for granted today in the days when having a source level debugger was a luxury. Some of these features include:

- Multiprocessor operation
- Heterogeneous
- Distributed
- Dynamic thread view of the system
- Synchronized debugging for multiple threads
- Trace functions
- Operating system resource displays
- Source and assembly level debugging

It started as an academic research project (originally called Melody for debugging the Harmony Operating System). The results were published in one of the early papers on debugging multiprocessor systems.

The current version of the Unison Operating System continues to use both gdb and Remedy debugger.
