= Thoth (operating system) =

Research operating system

- Developer: University of Waterloo
- Written in: Eh, Zed, assembly language
- OS family: RTOS
- Working state: Discontinued
- Initial release: October 1976; 49 years ago
- Marketing target: Research
- Available in: English
- Update method: Recompiling
- Supported platforms: Honeywell 6050; Data General Nova 2 Texas Instruments TI990/10
- Kernel type: Microkernel
- Succeeded by: Port, Verex, Harmony, V

Thoth is a real-time, message passing operating system (OS) developed at the University of Waterloo in Waterloo, Ontario Canada.

== History ==
Thoth was developed at the University of Waterloo in Waterloo, Ontario, Canada. The curriculum at Waterloo includes a Real Time Operating Systems course and an associated "Train lab", where students must develop a real-time operating system (RTOS) to control a model track with multiple trains.

In 1972, the B programming language, a derivative of BCPL, was brought to Waterloo by Stephen C. Johnson while on sabbatical from Bell Labs. A new language derived from B, named Eh, was developed at Waterloo. Thoth was written originally in Eh with some assembly language.

Initial development of Thoth occurred on a Honeywell 6050 computer. It was first run on a Data General Nova 2 in May 1976, and was next ported to a Texas Instruments TI990/10 in August 1976.

In October 1976, the University of Waterloo published Laurence S. Melen's Master's Thesis, titled "A Portable Real-Time Executive, Thoth".

Eh was later upgraded, in part with the addition of data types, and renamed Zed. Thoth was then rewritten in Zed.

One of the early principal developers of Thoth was David Cheriton. Cheriton would go on to develop the Verex kernel, and the V-System OS; both influenced by Thoth. Another early developer was Michael Malcolm, who would later found Waterloo Microsystems, Network Appliances, Inc., Blue Coat Systems, and Kaliedescape, several of whose operating systems are believed to have been derived from or influenced by Thoth.

Certain papers describe DEMOS as the inspiration for Thoth. As prior art Cheriton cited Per Brinch Hansen's RC 4000, then listed Thoth, DEMOS, and Accent together as later developments. Other influences on the development of Thoth included Multics, Data General's RTOS, Honeywell GCLS, and Unix. Later references cite Thoth as the original implementation of its particular use of synchronous message passing and multiprocess program structure, which were subsequently applied by other projects.

Work on Thoth ended around 1982.

== Features ==
Thoth was developed to meet four goals:

1. Easily portable to other hardware
2. Programs run as a set of inexpensive, cooperating concurrent processes with efficient inter-process communications (IPC)
3. Suitable for real-time uses as to system response to external events
4. Adaptable and scalable to a wide range of real-time uses

Thoth exposes the same abstract machine to application software, regardless of the underlying physical machine. This abstract machine was defined with certain minimal requirements, such that meeting these requirements allowed a given computer to be included in the Thoth Domain of potential Thoth port targets.

Processes running under Thoth can be grouped into "Teams". All processes within a team share a common address space and can share data. This is similar to other systems' concepts of "lightweight processes" or threads. Processes not members of the same team communicate using Thoth's IPC.

Inter Process Communication in Thoth is primarily accomplished by means of synchronous message passing. This approach greatly simplified message queueing.

Although the term was not current when the original papers were written, Thoth has been called a microkernel.

Thoth's synchronous message passing IPC lent itself to the application of an anthropomorphic programming model, building on the work of Carl Hewitt's actor model, and of Smalltalk.

== Legacy ==
The Thoth operating system provided either the basis or the inspiration for several later projects, some of which are listed below.

=== Academic ===
- The microNet distributed file server system at the University of Waterloo ran on an operating system named WatSys that was similar to Thoth, and Port. WatSys debuted in 1981.
- The National Research Council of Canada was the development home of the Harmony operating system, a derivative of Thoth oriented towards real-time robot control.
- Cheriton took a position at the University of British Columbia, where he was involved in developing Verex, and Distributed Verex, using many of the ideas he had earlier explored in Thoth.
- Cheriton later moved to Stanford University in the US, where he developed the V-System, which continued to build on earlier work with Thoth.
- The Sylvan Multiprocessing system's architecture included a coprocessor that implemented Thoth's synchronous message passing primitives (and Ada's extended rendezvous) in hardware.
- Thoth and its message passing IPC were used to underpin a multi-process paint program that employed the anthropomorphic programming model.
- Thoth's message passing semantics were part of an experimental parallel-processing version of the computer algebra system (CAS) Maple.
- The distributed Process Execution And Communication Environment (PEACE) was developed for high-performance applications. The paper cites Thoth as a "major foundation" for the project.
- The Eindhoven Multi-Processor System (EMPS) executive put an emphasis on efficiency. Thoth provided the inspiration for the design of the EMPS kernel.
- An experimental human-computer interface environment named the Room system was built on Waterloo Port, which was derived from Thoth and which used its IPC techniques. The Room paper references earlier Thoth papers.
- The Flash web server, a research project with an emphasis on efficiency and portability, was said to resemble Thoth in its method of multi-process structuring and concept of process teams communicating via message passing.

=== Commercial ===
- Gordon Bell and Dan Dodge, developers of the QNX message passing realtime operating system, both worked with Thoth while they were students at Waterloo.
- AT&T's System 75 Office Communication System was controlled by the Oryx kernel and the Pecos set of essential system processes, jointly referred to as Oryx/Pecos. It used ideas from Thoth, DEMOS, and an internal AT&T project.
- The commercial Waterloo Port network operating system was derived from Thoth. The associated Zed language was upgraded to become the PORT language for Waterloo Port.
- Hayes Microcomputer Products acquired Waterloo Microsystems, and rebranded and upgraded the Waterloo Port product to create LANstep.
- The Auspex storage company produced the Functional Multiprocessing Kernel (FMK), which employed concepts identified as having been first developed in Thoth. Unlike the V-System and Waterloo Port, FMK had no memory management.
- Early versions of Network Appliance, Inc.'s storage appliance operating system have been described as being very similar to Thoth. NetApp's OS was written by David Hitz, who had previously been at Auspex.
- In 1996 the CacheFlow web acceleration appliance company released their CacheOS, which was based on Thoth. In 2001 CacheFlow was renamed Blue Coat Systems and, with the addition of a policy engine, CacheOS became the Secure Gateway Operating System (SGOS).
