= Arista Networks =

American information technology company

Arista Networks, Inc.
- Formerly: Arastra (2004–2008)
- Type: Public company
- Traded as: NYSE: ANET; S&P 100 component; S&P 500 component
- Industry: Networking hardware
- Founded: October 2008; 17 years ago
- Founders: Andy Bechtolsheim; Kenneth Duda; David Cheriton
- Headquarters: Santa Clara, California, U.S.
- Key people: Jayshree Ullal (CEO and Chairperson); Andy Bechtolsheim (Chief Architect); Kenneth Duda (President & CTO); Todd Nightingale (President & COO)
- Products: Network operating systems; Network switches
- Revenue: ▲US$9.006 billion (2025)
- Operating income: ▲US$3.8 billion (2025)
- Net income: ▲US$3.5 billion (2025)
- Total assets: ▲US$19.45 billion (2025)
- Total equity: ▲US$12.37 billion (2025)
- Owners: Andy Bechtolsheim (14.6%)
- Number of employees: 5,115 (December 2025)
- Website: arista.com

Arista Networks, Inc. is an American provider of client to cloud networking services for large data center/AI, campus and routing environments.

== Corporate history ==
Arista Networks was founded and incorporated in 2008, evolving from its roots in Arastra, established in 2004. Arista went public as ANET in 2014 and entered the S&P 100 in 2026 and was recognized on the 2026 Fortune 500 list of the largest United States corporations by revenue. It provides cloud and AI high performance networking. Members of Arista’s leadership team have experience in networking and innovation.

In June 2014, Arista Networks had its initial public offering on the New York Stock Exchange under the symbol ANET.

In December 2014, Cisco filed two lawsuits against Arista alleging intellectual property infringement., and the United States International Trade Commission issued limited exclusion and cease-and-desist orders concerning two of the features patented by Cisco and upheld an import ban on infringing products. In 2016, on appeal, the ban was reversed following product changes and two overturned Cisco patents, and Cisco's claim was dismissed. In August 2018, Arista agreed to pay Cisco US$400 million as part of a settlement that included a release for all claims of infringement by Cisco, dismissal of Arista's antitrust claims against Cisco, and a 5-year stand-down between the companies.

In August 2018, Arista Networks acquired Mojo Networks. In September 2018, Arista Networks acquired Metamako and integrated its low-latency product line as the 7130 series. In February 2020, Arista acquired Big Switch Networks. In October 2020, Arista acquired Awake Security.

Arista's CEO, Jayshree Ullal, was named to Barron's list of World's Best CEOs in 2018 and 2019.

In August 2022, Arista Networks acquired Pluribus Networks, a unified cloud network company, for an undisclosed sum.

In July 2025, Arista expanded its AI-driven campus and branch networking offerings and acquired the VeloCloud SD-WAN portfolio from Broadcom. This combination of innovations has the potential to bring operational ease through zero touch operations, proactive monitoring, and automated troubleshooting across the broad set of client-to-cloud networking domains.

Jayshree Ullal was named on the Fortune Most Powerful Women 2026 list.

== Products ==
=== Extensible Operating System ===
Extensible Operating System (EOS)
- Developer: Arista Networks
- Written in: C, C++, Python, Assembly, Go
- OS family: Network operating system
- Working state: Current
- Source model: Open source and closed-source
- Initial release: 2004; 22 years ago
- Marketing target: Computer networks
- Available in: English
- Supported platforms: IA-32, x86-64
- Kernel type: Monolithic
- Default user interface: Command-line
- License: Open source and Proprietary
- Official website: www.arista.com/en/products/eos

Arista Extensible Operating System (EOS) is a network operating system with a feature set optimized for data center, campus and routing network use-cases across Cloud, AI, Enterprise, and Service Provider environments. Built on modern cloud operations principles, EOS operates as a single software base across Arista’s entire hardware portfolio, while also supporting virtualized (vEOS) and containerized (cEOS) deployments.

==== Core Architecture and State-Sharing Model ====
EOS is a networking stack built on an unmodified Linux kernel. Its design philosophy is a multi-process state-sharing architecture that completely separates state information from operational processes, unlike legacy operating systems that rely on monolithic kernels with fate-sharing code paths.

Protocol processing, security functions, and hardware drivers run entirely in the user address space as independent processes called agents. The center of this architecture is an in-memory database, SysDB, that governs system state via a streamlined publish/subscribe model:

State Decoupling: Agents never communicate directly with one another. Instead, they publish state changes to the central database, which automatically streams asynchronous notifications to any agents subscribed to those specific state types.

Software Fault Containment: Because services are strictly isolated in user space, a software defect or crash in one agent does not trigger a full system failure.

Stateful Restarts: If an agent restarts, it instantly re-subscribes to the central database and picks up exactly where it left off, achieving sub-50ms fault recovery and fast network convergence without rebuilding its state from scratch.

==== High Availability and Hitless Upgrades ====
Built explicitly for mission-critical production environments, EOS delivers high availability through its design:

Hitless Software Patches: Operators can apply hotfixes, often for security vulnerability patches, to an individual process level in real-time. The targeted agent restarts cleanly without impacting other system processes or disturbing the underlying data forwarding plane.

Smart System Upgrades (SSU): EOS supports hitless full-image upgrades. By leveraging accelerated software restarts, EOS upgrades the entire operating system image while maintaining continuous packet forwarding, helping to eliminate the need for planned downtime.

==== Evolution to Network-Wide State: Sysdb and NetDL ====
Device-level state sharing has historically been governed by SysDB, Arista's multi-process state repository present in every EOS instance. Modern EOS infrastructure expands this foundation into a Network Data Lake (NetDL). NetDL extends the EOS architecture beyond a single switch, centralizing and streaming device-level and network-wide states in real-time to a centralized repository. This functions as a network-wide software foundation for comprehensive visibility and predictive analytics, and serves as the basis for centralized management applications like Arista CloudVision.

==== Programmability and Modern NetDevOps ====
The pure Linux foundation of EOS allows the deployment of native Linux tools directly on the switch alongside modern DevOps frameworks. To support modern NetDevOps pipelines—treating network infrastructure as code—EOS offers an extensive programmability toolset:

eAPI (External API): A JSON-RPC based interface that allows operators to execute CLI commands remotely and retrieve outputs as structured JSON key-value pairs, eliminating brittle legacy screen-scraping methods.

EOS SDK: A native software development kit enabling operators to write custom, high-performance C++ or Python applications that run natively on the switch with direct programmatic access to the underlying hardware forwarding tables.

Modern Telemetry: Operating via open standards (like OpenConfig and gRPC), EOS continuously streams real-time system states directly to central monitoring fabrics like CloudVision for granular, historic forensic analysis.

=== Ethernet switches ===
Arista's switching portfolio spans cloud, AI, enterprise campus, routing, and ultra-low-latency environments. The product families include:

==== 7800R4 and 7800R3 Series ====
High-performance modular routing and AI networking platforms designed for hyperscale cloud, AI, service provider, and large enterprise deployments. The 7800R family delivers scalable 400G and 800G Ethernet connectivity, advanced routing capabilities, deep buffering, and high-density spine architectures for next-generation AI clusters and data center fabrics.

==== 7700R4 Series ====
Distributed Etherlink™ switching platforms optimized for large-scale AI networks. The 7700R4 family enables ultra-high-bandwidth AI cluster interconnects with support for 400G and 800G Ethernet, low-latency transport, and scalable AI fabric architectures.

==== 7500R3 Series ====
Modular universal spine and routing systems providing deep-buffer performance, large routing tables, and cloud-scale resiliency. Designed for data center, cloud, and service provider networks requiring high-performance routing and switching at scale.

==== 7388X5 Series ====
Compact modular spine switches delivering high-density 400GbE connectivity for modern data center and AI network architectures. The platform combines scalability, operational efficiency, and investment protection for evolving cloud infrastructures.

==== 7280R4 and 7280R3 Series ====
Universal leaf, spine, and routing platforms featuring deep-buffer Virtual Output Queuing (VOQ) architecture. Available in multiple fixed-form-factor configurations supporting 10GbE through 400GbE interfaces, these systems are widely deployed in cloud, enterprise, and service provider environments.

==== 7060X6 & XE7 Series ====
High-density data center switches supporting 100GbE, 400GbE, 800GbE and 1.6Tbps Ethernet connectivity. Designed for AI/ML workloads, cloud-scale applications, and next-generation data center fabrics.

==== 7060X5, 7060X4, and 7050X Series ====
Fixed-configuration leaf and spine switches providing high-performance Ethernet connectivity from 10GbE through 400GbE. These platforms offer low latency, high port density, and flexible deployment options for enterprise and cloud data centers.

==== 720XP, 722XPM, 720D, and 710P Campus Series ====
Enterprise access switches delivering multi-gigabit Ethernet, PoE/PoE++, MACsec encryption, and advanced telemetry capabilities. These systems form the foundation of Arista's Cognitive Campus architecture.

==== 750 Series Modular Campus Switches ====
High-performance modular campus platforms providing scalable aggregation and core networking services for large enterprise environments, supporting integrated wired and wireless operations.

==== 7130 Series ====
Ultra-low-latency programmable switching platforms combining FPGA acceleration, Layer 1 switching, packet capture, and advanced market-data processing capabilities. Widely deployed in financial trading, telecommunications, and specialized low-latency environments.

==== 7170 Series ====
Programmable switching platforms supporting customized packet processing, advanced telemetry, and application-specific networking functions using programmable data plane technologies.

All platforms operate on Arista EOS® (Extensible Operating System), providing a consistent software architecture, automation framework, telemetry, observability, and operational model across data center, campus, WAN, and cloud deployments.

=== Key Deployment Areas ===
Arista Ethernet switches are widely deployed across:

- AI and GPU cluster networking
- Hyperscale cloud data centers
- Enterprise data centers
- Service provider networks
- Campus and branch environments
- Financial trading infrastructure
- High-performance computing (HPC) environments

The combination of high-performance switching, cloud-scale routing, low-latency networking, and a common EOS software platform enables organizations to build scalable, resilient, and AI-ready network infrastructures.

==== Wireless, Security, Observability, and SD-WAN Solutions ====
Beyond its Ethernet switching and routing portfolio, Arista provides a comprehensive suite of wireless networking, network security, observability, and software-defined WAN (SD-WAN) solutions. These offerings extend Arista's cloud networking architecture from the data center to the campus, branch, edge, and multi-cloud environments.

==== Wireless Networking ====
Arista's Cognitive Wi-Fi portfolio delivers cloud-managed wireless networking for enterprise campuses, branch offices, educational institutions, healthcare organizations, and distributed enterprises.

Key capabilities include:

- Wi-Fi 6, Wi-Fi 6E, and Wi-Fi 7 access points
- Cloud-native wireless management
- AI-driven radio frequency (RF) optimization
- Location services and asset tracking
- User and device analytics
- Seamless integration with wired campus infrastructure
- Automated troubleshooting and network assurance

Arista's wireless architecture provides a unified operational model across wired and wireless networks through centralized management and policy enforcement.

==== Network Security ====
Arista's security portfolio is built around a Zero Trust networking model and combines network visibility, behavioral analytics, and threat detection capabilities.

Key security solutions include:

- Network Detection and Response (NDR)
- AI-driven threat detection and anomaly identification
- East-west traffic visibility across campus, data center, and cloud environments
- Device and user behavioral analytics
- Asset discovery and classification
- Network segmentation and micro-segmentation
- Identity-based policy enforcement
- MACsec encryption support across campus and data center networks

Arista's security architecture enables organizations to detect, investigate, and respond to threats while maintaining operational simplicity across distributed environments.

==== Network Observability and Operations ====
Arista provides a comprehensive network operations platform through CloudVision®, offering end-to-end visibility, automation, and assurance across data center, campus, cloud, and WAN infrastructures.

Key capabilities include:

- Real-time streaming telemetry
- Network-wide configuration management
- Automated provisioning and change control
- Compliance monitoring and auditing
- Root-cause analysis and troubleshooting
- Application and network performance monitoring
- Capacity planning and predictive analytics
- Network digital twin capabilities for testing and validation
- End-to-end infrastructure observability

CloudVision serves as a centralized management platform that enables consistent operations across physical, virtual, and cloud-based networking environments.

==== SD-WAN and Secure Edge Networking ====
Arista's SD-WAN portfolio provides secure connectivity for branch offices, remote users, cloud applications, and distributed enterprise networks.

Key capabilities include:

- Application-aware traffic steering
- Dynamic path selection and optimization
- Multi-cloud connectivity
- Secure branch networking
- Broadband, MPLS, and wireless WAN integration
- Centralized policy management
- WAN performance analytics
- Automated deployment and provisioning
- Integrated security and segmentation

The platform enables organizations to simplify WAN operations while improving application performance and reducing connectivity costs across geographically distributed locations.

== Arista Community Central ==
Arista Community Central is a centralized resource created by Arista Networks for customers, partners, and technical professionals. The community serves as a platform for sharing knowledge, engaging in discussions, and accessing various technical resources related to Arista’s networking technologies.

The community utilizes a search engine powered by AI to provide the most relevant results and to enhance user experience.

=== What the Community Offers ===
- Knowledge Base: A comprehensive Knowledge Base that includes technical articles, guides, and best practices for Arista products and solutions. It covers topics such as troubleshooting, tech tips, and configuration articles organized by technology, aiding users in managing and supporting their Arista products.
- Community Forum: The forum allows users to ask questions and participate in discussions related to Arista’s products. While the forum is publicly available, participation is limited to registered users, ensuring focused and expert-driven dialogue.
- Videos & Webinars: Arista Community Central also provides access to recorded webinars and technology-related videos hosted on the Community YouTube channel]aimed at deepening users’ understanding of Arista’s technology offerings.

== Major competitors ==
- Cisco Systems
- Extreme Networks
- Fortinet
- Hewlett Packard Enterprise (Aruba Networks division)
  - Juniper Networks - acquired by HPE, 2025.
- Nokia
