= David Cheriton =

Canadian businessman and computer scientist

- Born: David Ross Cheriton; March 29, 1951 (age 75); Vancouver, British Columbia, Canada
- Education: University of British Columbia (BS); University of Waterloo (MS, PhD)
- Spouse: Iris Fraser (m. 1980; div. 1994)
- Children: 4
- Awards: SIGCOMM Award for Lifetime Contribution (2003)
- Scientific career
- Fields: Computer science Mathematics; Business; Philanthropy
- Workplaces: University of British Columbia; Stanford University; Granite Systems; Kealia; Arista Networks
- Website: profiles.stanford.edu/david-cheriton

David Ross Cheriton (born March 29, 1951) is a Canadian computer scientist, businessman, philanthropist, and venture capitalist. He is a computer science professor at Stanford University, where he founded and leads the Distributed Systems Group.

He is a distributed computing and computer networking expert, with insight into identifying big market opportunities and building the architectures needed to address such opportunities. He has founded and invested in technology companies, including Google, where he was among the first angel investors; VMware, where he was an early investor; and Arista, where he was cofounder and chief scientist. He has funded at least 20 companies.

As of 2025, Forbes estimated Cheriton's net worth at US$19.8 billion while Maclean's estimates his worth at $18.64 billion.

== Education ==
Born in Vancouver, British Columbia, Canada, Cheriton attended public schools in the Highlands neighborhood of Edmonton, Alberta, Canada.

He briefly attended the University of Alberta where he had applied for both mathematics and music. He was rejected by the music program, and then went on to study mathematics and received his Bachelor of Science (B.S.) degree from the University of British Columbia in 1973.

Cheriton received his Master of Science (M.S.) and Doctor of Philosophy (Ph.D.) degrees in computer science from the University of Waterloo in 1974 and 1978, respectively. He spent three years as an assistant professor at his alma mater, the University of British Columbia, before moving to Stanford.

== Research ==
Cheriton was involved in creating three microkernel operating systems (OSes). He was one of the early principal developers of Thoth, a real-time operating system, and then the Verex kernel. He then founded and led the Distributed Systems Group at Stanford University, which developed a microkernel OS named V. He has published profusely in the areas of distributed computing and computer networking. He won the prestigious SIGCOMM award in 2003, in recognition for his lifetime contribution to the field of telecommunications networks. Cheriton was the mentor and advisor of students such as: Sergey Brin and Larry Page (founders of Google), Kenneth Duda (founder of Arista Networks), Hugh Holbrook (VP Software Engineering at Arista Networks), Sandeep Singhal (was GM at Microsoft, now at Google), and Kieran Harty (CTO and founder of Tintri).

As of 2016, Cheriton is working with Stanford students on transactional memory, making memory systems that are resilient to failures.

In-memory processing leads to dramatically faster computers – in some cases speeding up applications by a factor of 100,000. It changes the complete nature of how a business can run. We’re trying to lower the cost and to fit these systems in existing memory structures and reduce the number of components to make them more reliable and more secure.

— David R. Cheriton; 2016 interview

== Industry ==
Cheriton cofounded Granite Systems with Andy Bechtolsheim. The company developed gigabit Ethernet products. It was acquired by Cisco Systems in 1996.

In August 1998, Stanford students Sergey Brin and Larry Page met Bechtolsheim on Cheriton's front porch. At the meeting, Bechtolsheim wrote the first cheque to fund their company, Google, and Cheriton joined him as an angel investor with a $200,000 investment.

Cheriton was also an early investor in compute virtualization leader VMware, which was later acquired for $625M by EMC in 2004. VMware had a successful public offering in 2007.

In 2001 Cheriton and Bechtolsheim founded another start-up company, Palo Alto based Kealia. Kealia designed a high-capacity streaming video server; Galaxy, a range of servers based on AMD's Opteron microprocessor; and Thumper, an enterprise-grade network attached storage system. Kealia was bought by Sun Microsystems in 2004, with Thumper becoming the Sun Fire X4500.

In 2004, Cheriton cofounded (again with Bechtolsheim) and was chief scientist of Arista Networks, where he worked on the foundations of the Extensible Operating System (EOS). Arista had a successful public offering in 2014.

Cheriton is an investor in and advisory board member for frontline data warehouse company Aster Data Systems, which was acquired by Teradata in 2011 for $263M.

Cheriton is also one of the earliest investors in Tintri, a storage virtualization company founded by his student Kieran Harty. Cheriton was also an early investor in in-video advertising company Zunavision, and he founded OptumSoft.

In 2014, Cheriton cofounded and invested in Apstra, Inc. In 2015, he cofounded and invested in BrainofT, Inc. (Caspar).

After their 2021 acquisition of Apstra, he was named as the Chief Data Center Scientist at Juniper Networks.

== Lifestyle ==
Although the Google investment alone would be worth over US$1 billion, Cheriton has a reputation for a frugal lifestyle, avoiding costly cars or large houses. He was once included in a list of "cheapskate billionaires".

On November 18, 2005, the University of Waterloo announced that Cheriton had donated $25 million to support graduate studies and research in its School of Computer Science. In recognition of his contribution, the school was renamed the David R. Cheriton School of Computer Science. In 2009, he donated $2 million to the University of British Columbia, which will go to fund the Carl Wieman Science Education Initiative (CWSEI). He more recently donated $7.5M to fund a new chair in computing, and a new course on computational thinking.

Cheriton has also funded two graduate student fellowships and one undergrad fellowship at Stanford, and donated several millions of dollars to Stanford to fund research.

He campaigned against Asynchronous Transfer Mode (ATM) that was favored by telephone carriers, preferring Ethernet, which he saw as a simpler, proven option. Ethernet gradually superseded alternatives.

== Personal life ==
In 1980, Cheriton married Iris Fraser. They divorced in 1994.

According to public record, Cheriton has made donations to Republican causes including the party, candidate PACs, senators, and made a total of over $5,000 in donations to the presidential candidate Donald Trump.

== See also ==
- List of University of Waterloo people
