= Photonically Optimized Embedded Microprocessors =

The Photonically Optimized Embedded Microprocessors (POEM) is DARPA program. It should demonstrate photonic technologies that can be integrated within embedded microprocessors and enable energy-efficient high-capacity communications between the microprocessor and DRAM. For realizing POEM technology CMOS and DRAM-compatible photonic links should operate at high bit-rates with very low power dissipation.

== Current research ==
Currently research in this field is at University of Colorado, Berkeley University, and Nanophotonic Systems Laboratory ( Ultra-Efficient CMOS-Compatible Grating Coupler Design).
