= Patrick J. Gallagher =

American sports businessman and author (born 1949)

Patrick Joseph Gallagher (born February 23, 1949) is an American sports businessman and author. He is the co-author of Big Game Bigger Impact: How the Bay Area Redefined the Super Bowl Experience and the Lessons Learned That Can Apply to Any Business with co-author Stephanie Martin, and was executive vice president of marketing, partnerships and communication for the San Francisco Bay Area Super Bowl 50 Host Committee.

== Career ==
Croix De Candlestick button: "I came, I saw, I survived"

Gallagher was born in Chicago, Illinois. He attended San Diego State University and Humboldt State University and began his career in marketing with SeaWorld amusement parks. In 1976, while working at Marine World amusement park in Redwood City, California, Gallagher was hired by San Francisco Giants owner Bob Lurie as the team's marketing director. While with the Giants, Gallagher created several notable marketing campaigns such as the Croix De Candlestick (a button given to any fan who braved the elements and remained for an extra inning night game), Crazy Crab, and the Ball Dudes. Gallagher served as senior vice president, business operations and ultimately president, Giants Enterprises .

After leaving the Giants in 2009, Gallagher and partners founded the Alternative Golf Association (also known as "Flogton") with the goal of developing new approaches to the game of golf that are more fun and more accessible for recreational players but can be played on existing courses and within the existing framework of the industry. Gallagher also served as the president of Giants Enterprises, concentrating on bringing non-baseball events to AT&T Park. He is a founder of the Emerald Bowl now called the Kraft Bowl, an NCAA college bowl game played at AT&T Park annually. He is also chairman emeritus of the San Francisco Convention and Visitors Bureau and board member of the Bay Area Sports Hall of Fame.

Gallagher and Martin's book Big Game Bigger Impact was published in May 2017 by Motivational Press. Big Game, Bigger Impact chronicles how the members of the San Francisco Bay Area Super Bowl 50 Host Committee came together with the region to work on what would be the biggest Super Bowl the NFL had ever staged – the milestone Super Bowl 50. The first Super Bowl in the Bay Area in more than 30 years, there was no municipal purse to tap for financial support, nor any roadmap to follow; this group had to develop its own playbook. After the final whistle was blown, Super Bowl 50 was the most giving, most shared and most participatory Big Game to date. In Big Game, Bigger Impact, former Super Bowl 50 Host Committee colleagues Gallagher and Martin provide an insider’s look into lessons learned during the Host Committee’s two-year run-up – lessons that could benefit any business – and how their culture helped to achieve a record-setting Super Bowl, both on and off the field.
