= I am Dunedin =

Advertising slogan

"I am Dunedin" logo, created by the Dunedin City Council.

I am Dunedin was an advertising slogan created for the city of Dunedin in New Zealand by the marketing and communications agency of the Dunedin City Council (DCC). It was first used in the television commercial "Are You Ready for Dunedin life?". After that, several print advertisements and television advertisements were created using the slogan to promote Dunedin's culture and heritage. The Iogo’s background is blue and the slogan is gold. The official website of the City of Dunedin is at the lower right hand side of the logo.

== Background ==
=== Origin ===
In the 1980s and 1990s, the City of Dunedin experienced slow population growth, with around 10,000 people “lost” to cities further north in New Zealand or overseas. This included the loss of governmental and corporate head offices and of significant middle management, trade and professional career opportunities.

Therefore, the perception of Dunedin was quite negative. The city council organised a public meeting in which councillors, tertiary and social services, as well as representatives from different communities chose the statement along with all other statements that were submitted. They unanimously chose “I am Dunedin” as the slogan. The original purpose of the slogan was to improve the wider perception of Dunedin. One year later, a public survey conducted by the Marketing and Communication Agency showed that most businesses were unable to find skilled workers, which had become a potential threat to Dunedin's economy.

The challenge for the City of Dunedin's marketing campaign was not only to attract skilled and professional workers to the city, but also to do so in an environment where other New Zealand cities had experienced long-term economic growth and where there was a perception of better job and lifestyle opportunities elsewhere. In response to the declining population and concerns about business growth, the DCC's Economic Development Committee developed a strategic plan to achieve economic growth and job creation.

For the next six years, the Marketing and Communication Agency's highest priority is to create a public campaign via a suitable brand statement to meet public's needs and to achieve DCC's overall goal.

=== History of promoting Dunedin ===
In the late 1980s, Dunedin earned a reputation for innovative, leading-edge place marketing within New Zealand. The city was the first in the country to develop a comprehensive branding strategy. The It's All Right Here campaign launched in 1988 remained successful until the early 1990s, when it declined due to lack of financial support.

In an effort to revitalise Dunedin's brand image in 1998, the That's the Spirit of Dunedin campaign was launched. This was an attempt to build on and refresh the original It's All Right Here campaign. An annual budget was committed to the city's promotional strategy and received some positive recognition.

However, lack of consultation in both campaigns meant that rather than basing the campaign on an integrated community approach, an outside agency imposed a solution for Dunedin. There was also concern that Dunedin's brand image had become confused and cluttered by the use of the two positioning statements, neither of which captured the unique essence of Dunedin. There was a need for a new clear image of Dunedin.

On 26 July 2001, DCC officially launched its new City Branding campaign in Dunedin to 1,000 business and community leaders. The 'I am Dunedin' breaks with the traditional style of presenting the City and elicits passion, emotion, and pride.

== Purpose ==
By launching the "I am Dunedin" campaign, the DCC's purpose is “to encourage changes of perception and to continue the city’s aim to increase business, tourism and population growth.”

Moreover, DCC has been to profile Dunedin positively and to present the City as an attractive place to live, work, do business and be educated. The I Am Dunedin campaigns linked directly with the Economic Development strategy with the aim to sustain and increase business growth. The DCC’s marketing department’s assigned focus has been to change negative perceptions of Dunedin and, more recently, to encourage skilled workers and families to move to Dunedin by increasing awareness of employment vacancies in the City.

== Advertisements and campaigns ==
=== “Are You Ready for Dunedin Life?” ===
The most successful campaign was a correspondent slogan “Are You Ready for Dunedin Life?”, a television commercial directed by Murray Page of ZOOM Productions. Murray Page worked with Marketing and Communication Agency in the Council and their photographer as the brainstorming group that developed the campaign together.

In 2004, the I Am Dunedin campaign took a risk by concentrating on one key message that was especially designed to take advantage of topical debate on transportation issues in Auckland and Wellington, which were under severe pressure from traffic congestion. Its core creative was a hard-hitting message that was relevant to all target audiences and offered Dunedin as the competitive alternative.

The Are You Ready for Dunedin Life? tactical campaign portrayed three of the original testimonials and key target markets (family, trades people, business professionals) stuck in their city's traffic. It showed them stressed and under pressure from the time-consuming toll, it took out of them. The television commercials were technically innovative in that they showed traffic coming to a halt, a billboard coming to life, and real people, who had moved to Dunedin, speaking directly to them of their new quality of life in Dunedin compared with the hassle of living in over-populated North Island cities such as Wellington. This empathises with the reality of life in Northern centres where people are stuck in traffic – unable to get out and have a life. The solution - “Are you Ready for Dunedin life?”

Additionally, “Are You Ready for Dunedin Life?” has been awarded with Marketing Awards Non-Profit category.

=== Music video ===
The official promotion music video titled "I am Dunedin" was produced by the Dunedin City Council in association with ZOOM Evolution, Bill Nichol Photography Limited and was composed by Murray Grindlay. The music video featured a theme song titled "I am Dunedin". The second promotion video was released in 2008 consisting five different parts including: I am 'Learning' Dunedin and the City's excellence in education from pre-school through to tertiary; I am 'Passion' Dunedin showing the City's passion for all sporting activities; and I am 'Fashion' Dunedin highlighting the vitality and creativity of Dunedin. I am 'Alive' Dunedin showed the vibrant nightlife and café scene; and I am 'Wild' Dunedin showed how uniquely close the city is to an abundance of wildlife and eco-tourism. These messages were incorporated into a yearlong advertising campaign that complemented key events such as fashion and sports, as well as local initiatives in education and tourism.

== Public reaction ==
=== Criticism ===
A significant number of people criticize that the slogan “I am Dunedin” does not represent something unique to Dunedin, it is merely a general commercial statement to attract business and investment from outside of Dunedin. Moreover, DCC has not gone through the public to select a suitable slogan therefore it has not been able to represent the Dunedin citizens as a whole.

“The campaigns made Dunedin seem foolish.”

— Academic Practice Fellow, University of Otago Design Department

“Have you heard of a slogan called “I am Dunedin”?”---“Huh, no, I haven't.”

— Street photographer

“It doesn't mean anything.”

— Archive Assistance

=== Compliment ===
Despite a significant amount of criticism from Dunedin's citizens, the majority of people around New Zealand speak highly of the benefit and effectiveness this “I am Dunedin” campaign has brought to the local economy and boost of the job opportunities. For example, people outside of Dunedin remain very positive and highly disposed to Dunedin as a place to visit. 91% of those surveyed said that their impressions of Dunedin were positive as a result of the advertising they had seen.

== Achievement ==
Annual market research quantified the “I am Dunedin” success with positive awareness increasing from 21% in December 2001 to 29% in 2003, and later leapt to 60% and 73% positive awareness for April 2005. Dunedin City was the most recalled city in New Zealand, beating Wellington, Auckland and Christchurch for two years in a row.

For seven years the city marketing’s key role was to externally promote Dunedin outside of the city to New Zealand and overseas. The city’s population rose incrementally from 115,000 people in 2001 to 122,000 people in 2006.

== Re-evaluation ==
DCC believes that it is now time for the city marketing mandate to be reviewed in order for future campaigns to have a meaningful contribution to Dunedin’s economic and social prosperity. Moreover, the Council’s marketing team has been conducting a series of focus groups with community leaders to identify issues and develop a long-term marketing strategy.

The Dunedin City Council projects that the “I am Dunedin” campaign will remain effective. They attibute this to its branding approach and its impact on public perception. Because the brand is designed to be adaptable, it can be integrated into future promotional and communication campaigns for the city.

== Replacement and further slogans ==
"I am Dunedin" was dropped by DCC in 2010, and was replaced by the slogan "It's All Right Here". This slogan was also replaced, followed by several other subsequent ones, including dropping the slogan entirely and making the city the brand, "Dunedin, A Pretty Good Plan D", "It's Just Dunedin", and various slogans comparing Dunedin to other cities in New Zealand, the latter funded by Enterprise Dunedin, the economic development branch of the DCC.

Many of Dunedin's citizens have criticised the city's various slogans for being ineffective and portraying the city as mediocre.

== Sources ==
- Hooker, Jennifer. ‘Branding Dunedin: passionate, active, vibrant, youthful.’ Working on the edge: A Portrait of Business in Dunedin. Dunedin, New Zealand: Otago University Press, 2007. 78-87
- ‘I am Dunedin.’ Com. Murray Grindlay, ZOOM Evolution, 2007.
- Jennifer Hooker. Personal interview. Face to Face. Audiocassette in possession of author. 27 March 2009.
