= Alternative Golf Association =

Golf group formed in Silicon Valley in 2011

The Alternative Golf Association, also known as Flogton ("not golf" backwards), was formed in 2011 by a group of Silicon Valley executives. It tried to encourage golf participation by relaxing or ignoring traditional rules to reduce player frustration. According to the National Golf Foundation, there was a decline in the number of golfers and rounds played in 2011 compared to 2005. Flogton aspired to stimulate golf as snowboarding helped skiing. Patrick J. Gallagher (CEO), Scott McNealy (Commissioner) and Bob Lurie were involved with Flogton.

Flogton encouraged nonconforming equipment such as lubricant applied to club faces, wedges textured like cheese graters and Polara Golf Ultimate Straight balls.
