= Louis Lurie =

Jewish-American real estate developer

Louis R. Lurie
- Born: September 6, 1888; Chicago, Illinois, U.S.
- Died: September 7, 1972 (age 84)
- Occupation: Real estate developer
- Spouse: Babette Greenbaum
- Children: Bob Lurie

Louis R. Lurie (September 6, 1888 – September 7, 1972) was an American real estate developer and financial backer of Broadway shows.

== Biography ==
Lurie was born to a Jewish family in Chicago, Illinois.

== Career ==
His parents were divorced and he worked at an early age to help support his family. At the age of 14, he opened his own printing business. He moved to Seattle and then in 1914, to San Francisco and used the proceeds from his printing operations to purchase and later develop real estate. In 1915, he built the first movie house in San Francisco. He went on to build over 300 buildings in San Francisco and owned the Geary Theatre and the Curran Theatre. In 1962, he bought the Mark Hopkins Hotel for $14 million.

His Hale Bros. and J. C. Penney Co. real estate deals were noteworthy.

== Broadway ==
He was a financial backer of many Broadway shows including South Pacific, Teahouse of the August Moon, and Fiddler on the Roof.

== Personal life ==
In 1918, he married Babette Greenbaum; they had one son, Bob Lurie. His wife died in 1956.

His charitable activities were channeled through the Lurie Foundation.
