= Bob Lurie =

American real estate magnate and philanthropist

Robert Alfred Lurie
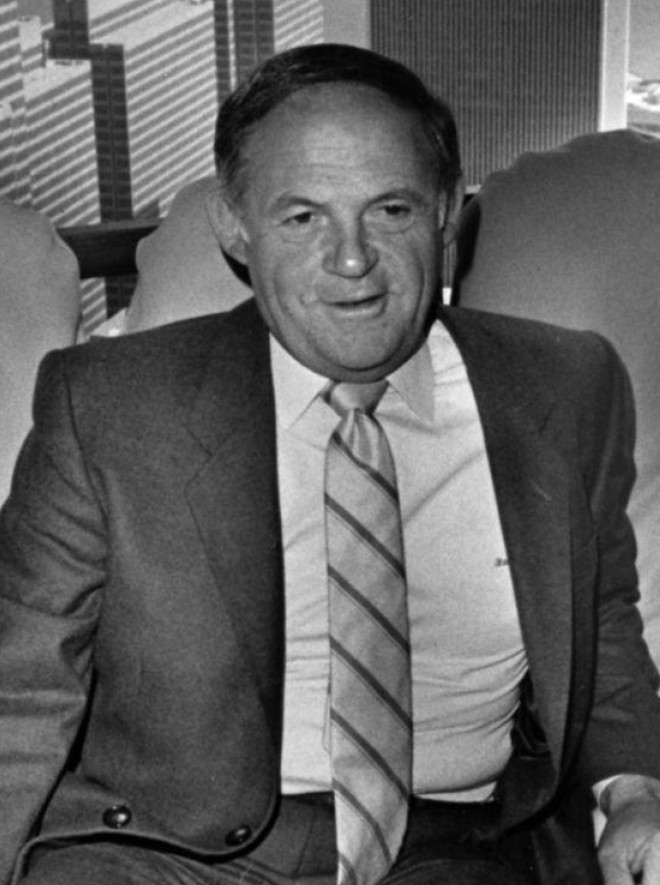
- Lurie in 1985
- Born: January 29, 1929 (age 97); San Francisco, California, U.S.
- Other name: Bob Lurie
- Occupation: real estate developer
- Known for: owner of the San Francisco Giants
- Spouse(s): Connie, Bob's wife, attended high school in San Jose.
- Parent(s): Babette Greenbaum Lurie; Louis Lurie

Robert Alfred Lurie (born January 29, 1929) is an American real estate magnate and philanthropist who owned the San Francisco Giants from March 2, 1976 until January 12, 1993.

== Early life ==
Lurie was born to a Jewish family in San Francisco, the son of Babette (née Greenbaum) and Louis Lurie. In 1972, he took over the real estate company founded in 1922 by his father. The company built a number of properties along Montgomery Street over the years, including a building Bank of America bought and tore down for its world headquarters at 555 California Street. Many of these buildings are still owned by the company.

== Giants ownership ==
In 1975, Giants owner Horace Stoneham agreed to sell the team to a group led by the Labatt Brewing Company, which planned to move the franchise to Toronto. San Francisco Mayor George Moscone obtained an injunction blocking the sale and then turned to Lurie, a Giants minority owner and board member, to assemble a group that could buy the team and keep it in San Francisco. In February 1976, Lurie announced that he would bid $8 million.

Lurie's original investment partner was former Texas Rangers owner Bob Short. Lurie insisted that since, unlike Short, he was a San Francisco resident, he should have the final say in operational and league matters. The other National League owners were concerned about Short's checkered tenure as owner of the Rangers and also insisted that Lurie be empowered to cast the Giants' vote at owners' meetings. Short backed out of the deal on March 2, 1976, just days before the start of spring training. Racing a league-imposed five-hour deadline, Lurie convinced Phoenix-based meat packer Bud Herseth to put up half the purchase price. The transaction was unanimously approved by the other National League owners later that day. Lurie held a 51 percent controlling interest and Herseth held the other 49 percent. Lurie said that while he and Herseth were "equal partners in operation," he would cast the team's vote in league matters.

Lurie bought out Herseth three years later in spring 1979.

Lurie initially tried to make improvements to Candlestick Park but concluded that the Giants could succeed there. In 1987 and 1989, San Francisco voters rejected stadium referendums to build a new downtown park while a plan to improve the existing stadium failed by an even wider margin. Lurie looked to move the team to San Jose or Santa Clara, but voters there rejected stadium proposals.

In June 1992, Lurie announced that he would sell the Giants, claiming that he could no longer sustain the financial losses that had accumulated over the last few years. When no credible offers surfaced from Bay Area interests, Lurie agreed to sell the Giants for $115 million to an ownership group headed by Tampa businessman Vince Naimoli with plans to move the club to St. Petersburg, Florida. The National League nixed the deal and pressured Lurie to sell to Bay Area investors. In an 11th-hour effort to save the team from moving, a group of local investors headed by Safeway Inc. chairman Peter Magowan offered Lurie $100 million.

== Other ventures ==
Since selling the Giants, Lurie has focused on his real estate firm, the Lurie Co. He is also involved in various philanthropic activities, which include the $20 million Louis R. Lurie Foundation. Lurie is an adviser of the Alternative Golf Association.

Preceded by	San Francisco Giants President -1985	Succeeded by Al Rosen
