= Erastus Brainerd =

Brainerd, circa 1897

Erastus Brainerd (25 February 1855 – 25 December 1922) was an American journalist and art museum curator. During the Klondike Gold Rush, he was the publicist who "sold the idea that Seattle was the Gateway to Alaska and the only such portal".

Born in Middletown, Connecticut to Norman and Leora (Campbell), Brainerd attended Phillips Exeter Academy and Harvard University, from which he graduated at the age of 19. He served as curator of engravings at the Boston Museum of Arts, then traveled to Europe, where he promoted a tour for "lecturing showman" W. Irving Bishop. He was a social success in Europe, and became a Knight of the Order of St. John of Jerusalem, a Knight of the Red Cross of Rome, a Knight Templar, and a Freemason.

Back in America, he wrote editorials for the New York World, where he also became assistant night editor, then served as associate editor at the Atlanta Constitution and Philadelphia Press. As in Europe, he continued to be a gregarious joiner, becoming a member of the Union League, Penn Club, the Authors Club of New York and the Press Club of New York and numerous others. During his stay in Atlanta he went to Richmond, Virginia to marry Mary Bella Beale, daughter of Dr. James Beale, on 31 May 1882. Their first child, Mary Beale, was born the following year but died several months later. They named their second child Mary Beale too when she was born in 1886; Elizabeth came in 1888.

In July 1890, after recovering from three severe bouts of influenza, he headed west to become editor of the Seattle Press and the Seattle Press-Times (now The Seattle Times), a role he held until September 1893. He left to focus on the office of State Land Commissioner, to which he had been appointed March 15, 1893. He joined the Rainier Club and organized a local Harvard Club. In 1897, as secretary and executive officer of the newly founded Bureau of Information of the Seattle Chamber of Commerce, he became the most prominent figure in the publicity campaign that established Seattle's preeminence as a mercantile and outfitting center for the miners headed to the Yukon. He also convinced the federal government to open an assay office in Seattle. He briefly and unsuccessfully attempted to make a living as a "mining consultant" before becoming editor of the Seattle Post-Intelligencer. He was not a great success in that capacity: the P-I under his leadership was a definite second to the Times.

In the 1910s, he led the Anti-Prohibition Association of Washington in its unsuccessful fight to keep alcoholic beverages legal in Washington; Washington "went dry" at the beginning of January 1916. Brainerd died in Tacoma, Washington in 1922.

== Notes ==
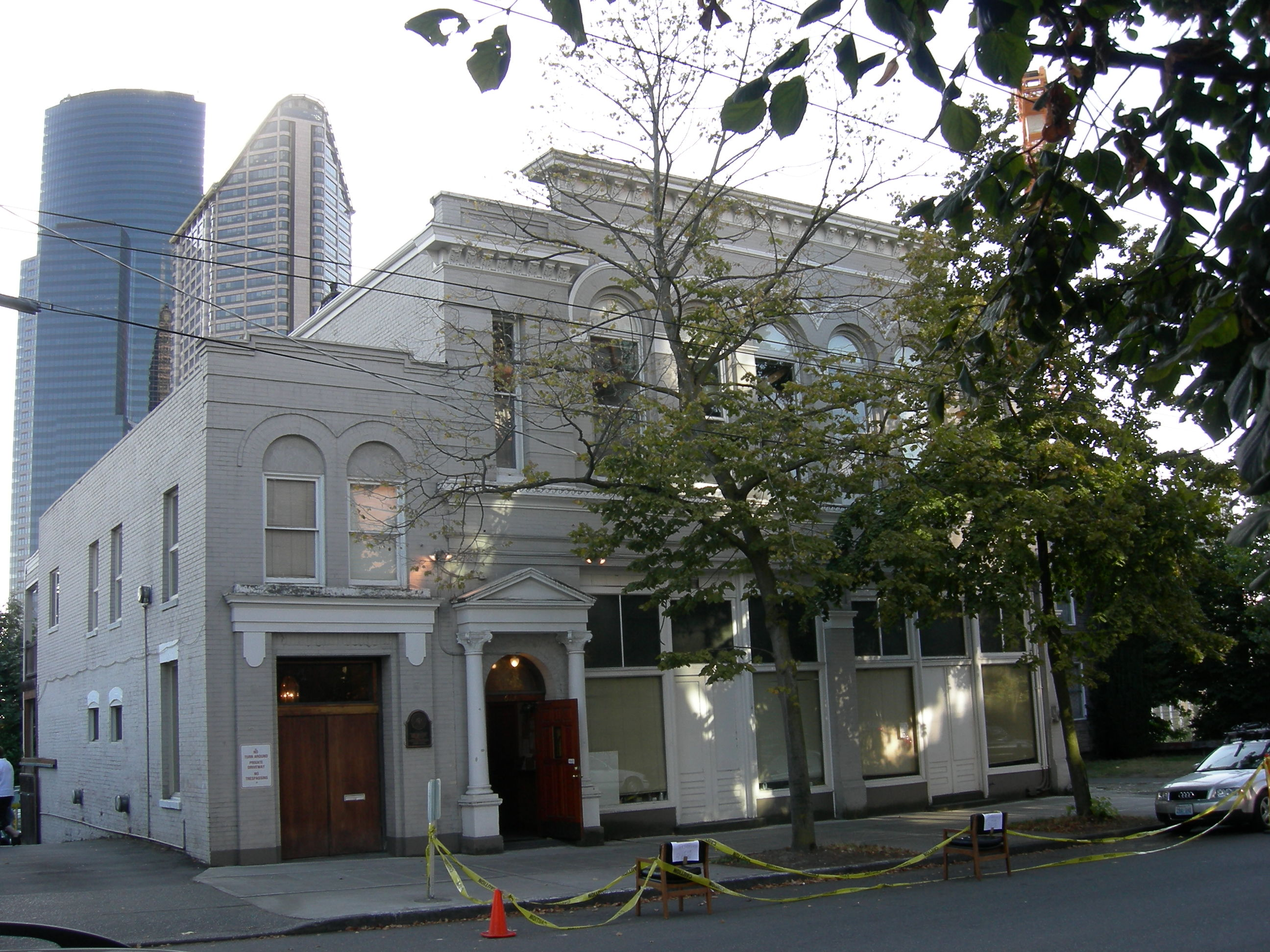
Seattle's Assay office, now the German Club.
