= List of mayors of Kitchener, Ontario =

Mayor of Kitchener
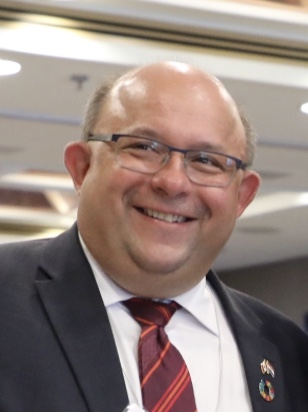
- Incumbent; Berry Vrbanovic since 2014
- Style: His Worship; Mayor
- Member of: City Council
- Seat: Kitchener City Hall
- Term length: Four years
- Inaugural holder: John Scott (Reeve); William Pipe (Mayor)
- Formation: 1854 (Reeve); 1871 (Mayor)
- Website: Kitchener Mayor

This is a list of reeves and mayors of Kitchener, Ontario, Canada. The village, town and later city were known as Berlin until 1916, when the city's name was changed to Kitchener. Berlin was incorporated as a village in 1854, became a town in 1870, and a city in 1912.

== Village of Berlin (1854–1870) ==
| # | Image | Reeve | Term start | Term end |
|---|---|---|---|---|
| 1 | | John Scott | 1854 | 1856 |
| 2 | | H. S. Huber | 1857 | 1857 |
| 3 | | Israel D. Bowman | 1858 | 1858 |
| 4 | | H. S. Huber | 1859 | 1864 |
| 5 | | Ward H. Bowlby | 1865 | 1868 |
| 6 | | Hugo Kranz | 1869 | 1870 |

== Town of Berlin (1870–1912) ==
| # | Image | Mayor | Term start | Term end |
|---|---|---|---|---|
| 1 | | William Pipe | 1871 | 1871 |
| 2 | | John Hoffman | 1872 | 1873 |
| 3 | | Hugo Kranz | 1874 | 1878 |
| 4 | | Louis Breithaupt | 1879 | 1880 |
| 5 | | John Motz | 1880 | 1881 |
| 6 | | Jacob Yost Shantz | 1882 | 1882 |
| 7 | | William Jaffray | 1883 | 1883 |
| 8 | | Alexander Millar | 1884 | 1885 |
| 9 | | Henry George Lackner | 1886 | 1887 |
| 10 | | Louis Jacob Breithaupt | 1888 | 1889 |
| 11 | | Henry L. Janzen | 1890 | 1890 |
| 12 | | Jacob M. Staebler | 1891 | 1891 |
| 13 | | Conrad Bitzer | 1892 | 1892 |
| 14 | | Henry George Lackner | 1893 | 1893 |
| 15 | | Daniel Hibner | 1894 | 1895 |
| 16 | | J. C. Breithaupt | 1896 | 1897 |
| 17 | | George Rumpel | 1898 | 1898 |
| 18 | | John Richard Eden | 1899 | 1900 |
| 19 | | George H. Bowlby | 1901 | 1901 |
| 20 | | John Richard Eden | 1902 | 1903 |
| 21 | | Carl Kranz | 1904 | 1905 |
| 22 | | Aaron Bricker | 1906 | 1907 |
| 23 | | Allen Huber | 1908 | 1908 |
| 24 | | Charles C. Hahn | 1909 | 1910 |
| 25 | | William H. Schmalz | 1911 | 1911 |

== City of Berlin (1912–1916) ==
| # | Image | Mayor | Term start | Term end |
|---|---|---|---|---|
| 1 | | William H. Schmalz | 1912 | 1912 |
| 2 | | William Daum Euler | 1913 | 1914 |
| 3 | | John Emil Hett | 1915 | 1915 |

== City of Kitchener (1916–present) ==
| # | Image | Mayor | Term start | Term end |
|---|---|---|---|---|
| 1 | | John Emil Hett | 1916 | 1916 |
| 2 | | David Gross | 1917 | 1919 |
| 3 | | John Richard Eden | 1920 | 1920 |
| 4 | | Charles Greb | 1921 | 1922 |
| 5 | | Louis Orville Breithaupt | 1923 | 1924 |
| 6 | | Nicholas Asmussen | 1925 | 1926 |
| 7 | | Edward E. Ratz | 1927 | 1928 |
| 8 | | William Pope Clement | 1929 | 1930 |
| 9 | | C. Mortimer Bezeau | 1931 | 1932 |
| 10 | | Henry W. Sturm | 1933 | 1934 |
| 11 | | Justus Albert Smith | 1935 | 1937 |
| 12 | | George W. Gordon | 1938 | 1939 |
| 13 | | Joseph Ignatino Meinzinger | 1940 | 1945 |
| 14 | | John G. Brown | 1946 | 1947 |
| 15 | | J. W. Washburn | 1948 | 1949 |
| 16 | | Stanley Francis Leavine | 1950 | 1951 |
| 17 | | Bruce Weber | 1952 | 1953 |
| 18 | | Donald Weber | 1954 | 1955 |
| 19 | | Fred L. Dreger | 1956 | 1957 |
| 20 | | Stanley Francis Leavine | 1958 | 1958 |
| 21 | | Kieth Hymmen | 1958 | 1958 |
| 22 | | Joseph Ignatino Meinzinger | 1959 | 1959 |
| 23 | | H. E. Wambold | 1960 | 1960 |
| 24 | | Joseph Ignatino Meinzinger | 1961 | 1962 |
| 25 | | James E. Gray | 1962 | 1962 |
| 26 | | Kieth Hymmen | 1963 | 1965 |
| 27 | | William L. Butler | 1966 | 1967 |
| 28 | | Sidney M. McLennan | 1968 | 1974 |
| 29 | | Edith McIntosh | 1975 | 1976 |
| 30 | | Morley Rosenberg | 1977 | 1982 |
| 31 | | Dom Cardillo | 1983 | 1994 |
| 32 | | Richard D. Christy | 1995 | 1997 |
| 33 | | Carl Zehr | 1997 | 2014 |
| 34 | | Berry Vrbanovic | 2014 | Incumbent |
