= Justus Albert Smith =

Canadian politician

- Albert Schmitt

Member of the Ontario Provincial Parliament for Waterloo North
- In office 1937–1943
- Preceded by: Nicholas Asmussen
- Succeeded by: John Henry Cook

Mayor of Kitchener, Ontario
- In office 1935–1937
- Preceded by: Henry Sturm
- Succeeded by: George W. Gordon

Personal details
- Born: June 7, 1894 New Hamburg, Ontario
- Died: July 5, 1971 (aged 77) Kitchener, Ontario
- Party: Liberal
- Occupation: Businessman

Justus Albert Smith (June 7, 1894 – July 5, 1971) was a politician in Waterloo County, Ontario, Canada. He served as mayor of Kitchener from 1935 to 1937 and represented Waterloo North in the Legislative Assembly of Ontario from 1937 to 1943 as a Liberal.

He was born in New Hamburg on June 7, 1894, and was educated in Kitchener public school and Waterloo Collegiate Institute. He worked for the Mutual Life Assurance Company and then the Canada Cement Company as a district representative for many years. Since these were war times, he found it difficult to do business with German spelling of his surname and so had the German spelling “Schmitt” changed to the English spelling “smith”. Smith served on the Kitchener Water Commission and the Kitchener Public Utilities Commission. He was president of the Ontario Mayors' Association and also served on the executive of the Dominion Mayors' Association. Smith was also a president of the Kitchener Horticultural Society and, in 1931, was the president of the Ontario Horticultural Association. Smith helped develop the Rockway Gardens in Kitchener by creating a public works program to beautify the city of Kitchener during the depression years. This employed many men. He was appointed Hydro Commissioner for the province of Ontario on October 6. 1937. Smith died of cancer July 5, 1971 at the age of 77.
