= Waterloo North (provincial electoral district) =

Former provincial electoral district in Ontario, Canada

Waterloo North was a provincial electoral district in Ontario, Canada, represented in the Legislative Assembly of Ontario from Confederation in 1867 until 1999.

It was abolished in 1999 when provincial ridings were defined to have the same borders as federal ridings, and most of its area was incorporated into the riding of Kitchener—Waterloo.

== Members of Provincial Parliament ==
Waterloo North
Assembly	Years	Member	Party
1st	1867–1871	Moses Springer	Liberal
2nd	1871–1875	Moses Springer	Liberal
3rd	1875–1879	Moses Springer	Liberal
4th	1879–1881	Moses Springer	Liberal
4th	1881–1883	Elias Weber Bingeman Snider	Liberal
5th	1883–1886	Elias Weber Bingeman Snider	Liberal
6th	1886–1890	Elias Weber Bingeman Snider	Liberal
7th	1890–1894	Elias Weber Bingeman Snider	Liberal
8th	1894–1898	Alexander Black Robertson	Liberal
9th	1898–1899	Henry George Lackner	Conservative
9th	1899–1902	Louis Jacob Breithaupt	Liberal
10th	1902–1905	Henry George Lackner	Conservative
11th	1905–1908	Henry George Lackner	Conservative
12th	1908–1911	Henry George Lackner	Conservative
12th	1911–1912	Henry George Lackner	Conservative
12th	1912–1914	Charles Henry Mills	Conservative
14th	1914–1919	Charles Henry Mills	Conservative
15th	1919–1923	Nicholas Asmussen	Independent Liberal
16th	1923–1926	William George Weichel	Conservative
17th	1926–1929	William George Weichel	Conservative
18th	1929–1934	Sydney Charles Tweed	Liberal
19th	1934–1937	Nicholas Asmussen	Liberal
20th	1937–1943	Justus Albert Smith	Liberal
21st	1943–1945	John Henry Cook	Co-operative Commonwealth
22nd	1945–1948	Joseph Ignatino Meinzinger	Liberal–Labour
23rd	1948–1951	John G. Brown	Liberal
24th	1951–1955	Stanley Francis Leavine	Progressive Conservative
25th	1955–1959	John Wintermeyer	Liberal
26th	1959–1963	John Wintermeyer	Liberal
27th	1963–1967	Keith Butler	Progressive Conservative
28th	1967–1971	Edward R. Good	Liberal
29th	1971–1975	Edward R. Good	Liberal
30th	1975–1977	Edward R. Good	Liberal
31st	1977–1981	Herb Epp	Liberal
32nd	1981–1985	Herb Epp	Liberal
33rd	1985–1987	Herb Epp	Liberal
34th	1987–1990	Herb Epp	Liberal
35th	1990–1995	Elizabeth Witmer	Progressive Conservative
36th	1995–1999	Elizabeth Witmer	Progressive Conservative
Dissolved into Kitchener—Waterloo

== Election results ==
1867 Ontario general election
Party	Candidate	Votes	%
Liberal	Moses Springer	908	50.67
Conservative	Mr. Zoeger	884	49.33
Total valid votes		1,792	71.68
Eligible voters		2,500	
Liberal pickup new district.			
Source: Elections Ontario

1871 Ontario general election
Party	Candidate	Votes
Liberal	Moses Springer	Acclaimed
Source: Elections Ontario

1875 Ontario general election
Party	Candidate	Votes	%
Liberal	Moses Springer	1,363	67.71
Conservative	A. Millar	650	32.29
Total valid votes		2,013	70.31
Eligible voters		2,863	
Liberal hold			
Source: Elections Ontario

1879 Ontario general election
Party	Candidate	Votes	%	±%
Liberal	Moses Springer	1,351	53.29	−14.42
Conservative	Mr. Walter	1,184	46.71	+14.42
Total valid votes		2,535	71.37	+1.06
Eligible voters		3,552		
Liberal hold		Swing		−14.42
Source: Elections Ontario

1977 Ontario general election
Party	Candidate	Votes	%	±%
Liberal	Herbert Epp	13,556	55.60	
Progressive Conservative	Bob Gramlow	8,016	32.88	
New Democratic	Mary Jane Mewhinney	2,809	11.52	

1981 Ontario general election
Party	Candidate	Votes	%	±%
Liberal	Herbert Epp	12,843	49.17	−6.43
Progressive Conservative	Bob Labbett	9,606	36.78	+3.90
New Democratic	Bob Needham	3,672	14.06	+2.54

1985 Ontario general election
Party	Candidate	Votes	%	±%
Liberal	Herbert Epp	16,458	54.60	+5.43
Progressive Conservative	Lynne Woolstencroft	9,149	30.45	–6.32
New Democratic	Richard Gerson	4,534	15.04	+0.98

1987 Ontario general election
Party	Candidate	Votes	%	±%
Liberal	Herbert Epp	16,792	52.35	–2.25
Progressive Conservative	Elizabeth Witmer	8,681	27.06	–4.39
New Democratic	Richard Hastings	5,785	18.04	+3.00
Libertarian	Ian O'Neill	818	2.55	

1990 Ontario general election
Party	Candidate	Votes	%	±%
Progressive Conservative	Elizabeth Witmer	14,552	37.43	+10.38
New Democratic	Hugh Miller	11,298	29.06	+11.02
Liberal	Andrew Telegdi	9,441	24.28	–28.07
Family Coalition	Ted Kryn	2,946	7.58	
Libertarian	Rita Huschka-Sprague	646	1.66	–0.89

1995 Ontario general election
Party	Candidate	Votes	%	±%
Progressive Conservative	Elizabeth Witmer	20,731	54.75	+17.32
Liberal	Bob Byron	8,279	21.86	–2.42
New Democratic	Hugh Miller	6,869	18.14	–10.92
Family Coalition	Sandra Kryn	1,714	4.53	–3.05
Independent	Blaine P. Watson	275	0.73	

== See also ==
- List of Ontario provincial electoral districts
- Canadian provincial electoral districts
