= William Jaffray =

William Jaffray may refer to:

- one of several Jaffray baronets of that name
- William Jaffray (footballer) (1885–1968), Scottish footballer
- William Jaffray (politician) (1832–1896), publisher and politician in Ontario, Canada
- William Stevenson Jaffray (1867–1941), highly decorated military chaplain
