= George Bowlby =

Canadian politician

Doctor George Herbert Bowlby MD CM MRCS LRCP
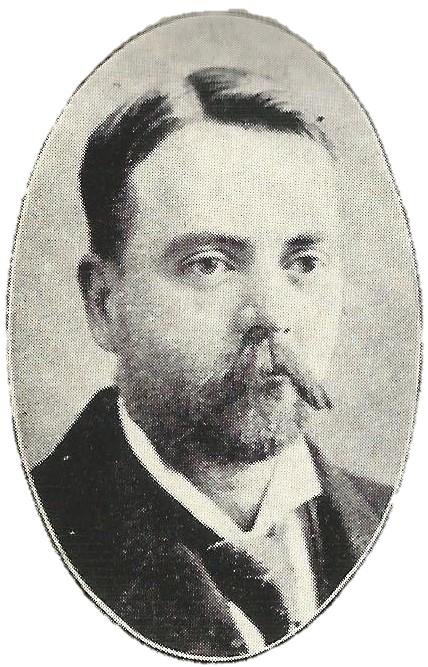
- Bowlby, 1912

Town Councillor of Berlin, Ontario
- In office 1896–1897

Deputy Reeve of Berlin, Ontario
- In office 1898–1899

Town Councillor of Berlin, Ontario
- In office 1900

Mayor of Berlin, Ontario
- In office 1901
- Preceded by: John Richard Eden
- Succeeded by: John Richard Eden

Personal details
- Born: 16 July 1865 Berlin, Canada West
- Died: 10 November 1916 (aged 51) Seaford, Sussex, England
- Spouse: Blanche Alexandrine "Adine" Seagram (m. 1894)
- Parents: David Sovereign Bowlby (father); Martha Esther Murphy (mother)
- Education: St. Jerome's College; Trinity College (MD)
- Occupation: Physician
- Military career
- Allegiance: Canada; United Kingdom
- Branch: Canadian Army Medical Corps
- Service years: 1914–16
- Rank: Major
- Unit: Canadian Expeditionary Force
- Conflicts: World War I

George Herbert Bowlby MD CM MRCS LRCP (16 July 1865 – 10 November 1916) was a Canadian physician and surgeon, municipal politician, and military officer. He was born in the town of Berlin, Ontario (now known as Kitchener), where he later practiced medicine and served in a succession of elected municipal positions, culminating in a term as mayor in 1901. Bowlby was the first person born in Berlin to become its mayor. In 1915, following the outbreak of the First World War, he joined the Canadian Expeditionary Force and travelled to England. There, he served in the Canadian Army Medical Corps and achieved the rank of Major. In November 1916, at the age of 51, he died in an accidental fall from a cliff near the military hospital in Sussex where he was assigned.

== Biography ==
=== Early life and family ===
George Herbert Bowlby was born on 16 July 1865 in the town of Berlin in Canada West, which became known as Kitchener in 1916. His father was David Sovereign Bowlby, who was born in 1828 in Townsend Township in Norfolk County, Ontario. His father, Adam Bowlby, who was George Herbert's paternal grandfather, was a captain in the colonial militia during the War of 1812 and the Upper Canada Rebellion; his paternal grandfather, Richard Bowlby, who was George Herbert's great-grandfather, was a United Empire Loyalist who had lived in New Jersey and emigrated to Canada as a result of the American Revolution.

George Herbert's mother, Martha Esther Murphy, was born in 1838 in Québec. She was living in Montréal in 1856 when she married David Bowlby. Her father, Alexander Murphy, was a merchant in Montréal; little else of him is known.

David Sovereign Bowlby, George Herbert's father, received a literary education at Upper Canada College in Toronto; this was followed by studies in medicine, first at the Toronto School of Medicine (receiving a medical doctorate) and then at the College of Physicians and Surgeons in New York City (where he received a second medical doctorate). David practiced medicine briefly in Paris, Ontario before relocating his practice to Berlin in October 1853. There, he became a prominent civic figure, serving on the town council for a number of years, as well as serving on the local school board. He was also active in the Church of England and president of the Berlin Rifle Association. Politically, he was "decidedly radical", and was also president of the Reform Association in Waterloo County.

George Herbert grew up in Berlin and attended the local public school and the Berlin High School (now Kitchener–Waterloo Collegiate and Vocational School), where he was a member of the football team. He then spent a year studying at St. Jerome's College before subsequently studying medicine at Trinity Medical College, Toronto, where he earned a doctorate in medicine. He undertook post-graduate work in England, where he became a Licentiate of the Royal College of Physicians (LRCP) and a Member of the Royal College of Surgeons (MRCS, Eng.) He returned to Berlin by 1891, where he became a partner in his father's medical practice. He began to dedicate himself to surgery while also involving himself in municipal politics, serving as a town councillor for a term in 1896–97, as deputy reeve in 1898–99, another term as a town councillor in 1900, and finally a term as mayor in 1901. Politically, he was described as "a progressive." His uncle, Ward Hamilton Bowlby, had been reeve before him, from 1865 to 1868.

It was also during this period, in 1894, that Bowlby married Blanche Alexandrine "Adine" Seagram, daughter of Joseph Emm Seagram, a wealthy distillery owner in the area. The previous year, 1893, Seagram had donated a 14-acre (5.7-hectare) parcel of land on the municipal border between Berlin and Waterloo to the Hospital Trust. This led to the opening of the Berlin and Waterloo Hospital (now the Grand River Hospital) in 1895. Bowlby took a keen interest in the hospital and would later serve on its Medical Advisory Committee.

In 1903, Bowlby sold his Berlin practice to C. J. W. Karn of Picton and returned to Europe for a second time to gain additional experience at hospitals in Vienna and Berlin (Germany). He returned a year and a half later and resumed practicing in Berlin, purchasing the practice of the deceased Dr. W.J. Arnott and taking up residence at 11 Weber Street West. He became associated with the 24th Regiment Grey's Horse of the Non-Permanent Active Militia, which was the local cavalry regiment at the time. He served as the regiment's medical officer with a rank of captain.

=== First World War ===
With the outbreak of the First World War, Berlin was divided. Despite vocal public support for the war emanating from the local German community, local newspapers and military officials expressed open anti-German sentiment, and the war ultimately led to a crackdown on German culture, symbolized by the campaign to rename Berlin to Kitchener in early 1916, after the British Field Marshal Herbert Kitchener, 1st Earl Kitchener. On the evening that war was officially declared, C Squadron of the Grey's Horse paraded through Victoria Park in Berlin in a show of patriotism. On 6 August 1914, the Grey's Horse, along with a number of other militia units, was placed on active service under section 69 of the Militia Act. It was joined with the 22nd Battalion The Oxford Rifles, an infantry unit, to form A Company of the 1st Battalion of the Canadian Expeditionary Force.

In 1915, the Canadian Expeditionary Force began being restructured to include a greater number of administrative corps to support the Canadian combat units, ultimately forming the Canadian Corps. The Canadian Army Medical Corps (CAMC) took a more prominent role, and Bowlby offered his services as a surgeon, departing from Berlin in July 1915. He travelled to England, where he took up a position at the Royal Military Hospital, Shorncliffe Barracks, which was attached to the Shorncliffe Army Camp near Cheriton, Kent. He was later reassigned to a hospital at Bath, Somerset, and finally to Seaford, Sussex. By the time of his transfer to Seaford, Bowlby had been acting as the Deputy Assistant Director of Medical Services. At Seaford, the army had taken over a mansion and girls' school named Ravenscroft (or Raven's Croft) to use as an auxiliary hospital, which had been in use by the Royal Army Medical Corps since 1914.

In 1916, a section of the Canadian Army Medical Corps under Lieutenant Colonel Edwin Seaborn, who had commanded the No. 10 Stationary Hospital at Shorncliffe, was sent to take over operations at Seaford. Upon their arrival on 31 October, there were already patients waiting at the hospital for them. The hospital was soon over capacity and infectious diseases, including measles and mumps, were running rampant. A week after the unit's arrival, Seaborn was forced to transfer some patients to the Seaford Convalescent Hospital (the local civilian hospital) and to requisition two private residences to isolate infectious disease cases. The takeover of Ravenscroft itself occurred on 5 November.

=== Death ===
Since arriving in England, Bowlby had been an active hill walker and had written a number of letters home to his mother, Martha, vividly describing the beauty of the seaside locations where he had been stationed. In the weeks leading up to his transfer to Seaford, he had complained of severe head pains.

On the evening of 10 November 1916, he was out walking at Seaford Head when, it was later surmised, he fell to his death. His body was discovered at the foot of some cliffs on 11 November, the next day, which was initially recorded as his official date of death. A message addressed to Bowlby's wife was sent from Ottawa to his home at 11 Weber Street West to inform her of his death, but she was in England as well, and it was received by a man named Reinhold Lang, who had been occupying the Bowlby residence in their absence. Lang telephoned Captain Thomas William Seagram, the paymaster of the 118th (North Waterloo) Battalion, who was Bowlby's brother-in-law. The news reached relatives at around 10:30 a.m. on Sunday, 12 November, and word quickly spread around the city, with civic flags at the city hall being lowered to half-mast. A coroner's inquest was conducted on 14 November which established his date of death to be 10 November and the cause of death to be an accidental fall.

Bowlby was cremated at the Golders Green Crematorium in London. His ashes were sent home to Kitchener and were subsequently buried at the Church of St. John the Evangelist, where he had been the warden. Two years later, in 1919, his widow, Adine, also died in an accident. She was riding in the back seat of a Peerless automobile being driven by her brother, Thomas Seagram, when the car was struck by the driver of a Ford Roadster. She was pinned under the car and was critically injured, dying later in hospital.

His nephew, William Pope Clement, later served as mayor of Kitchener.

== See also ==
- Ward Bowlby – his uncle
- List of mayors of Kitchener, Ontario
