= Bardish Chagger =

Canadian politician (born 1980)

The Honourable Bardish Chagger PC MP
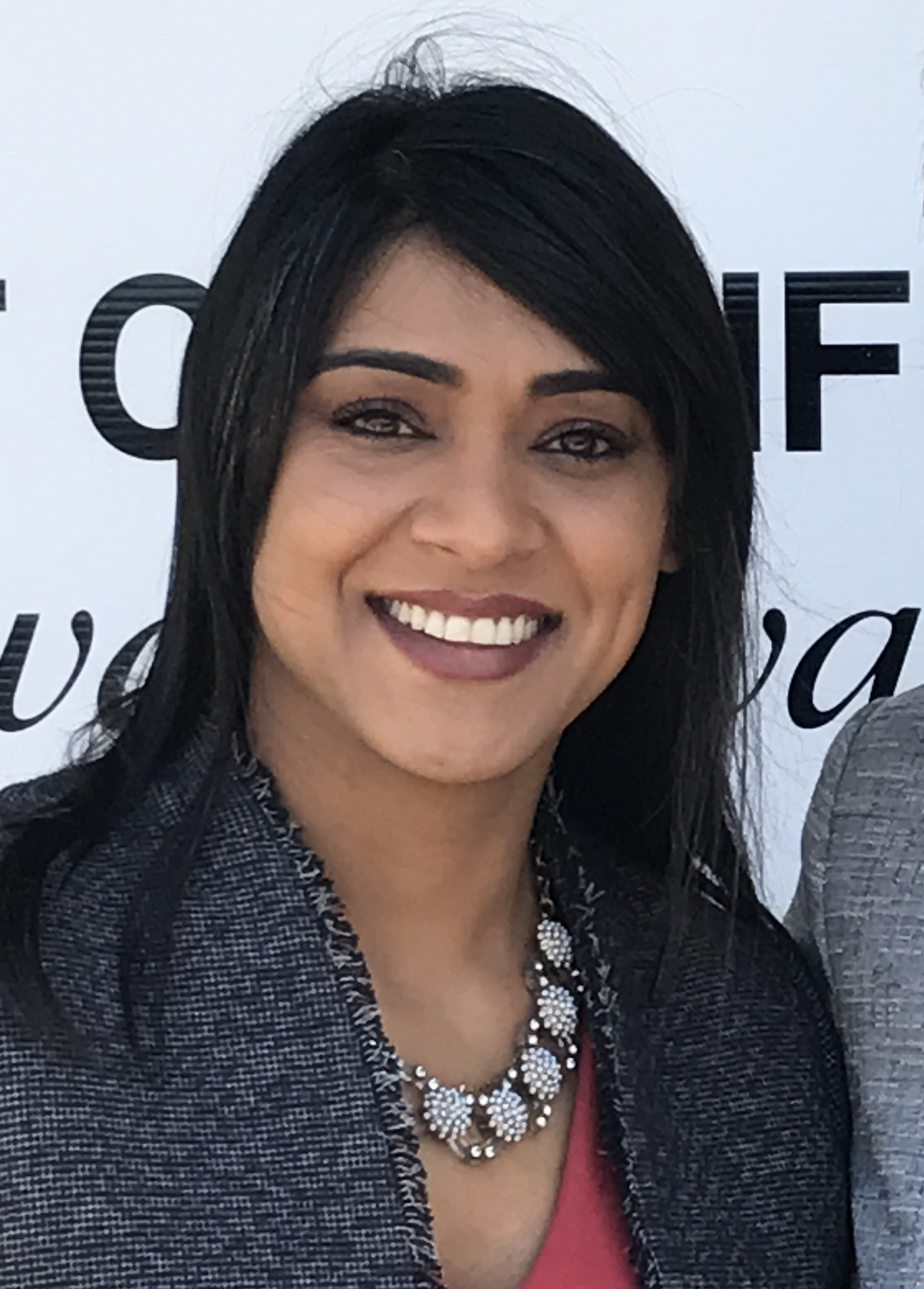
- Chagger in 2017

Minister of Diversity and Inclusion and Youth
- In office November 20, 2019 – October 26, 2021
- Prime Minister: Justin Trudeau
- Preceded by: Position created
- Succeeded by: Ahmed Hussen (Diversity and Inclusion); Marci Ien (Youth)

Leader of the Government in the House of Commons
- In office August 19, 2016 – November 20, 2019
- Prime Minister: Justin Trudeau
- Preceded by: Dominic LeBlanc
- Succeeded by: Pablo Rodríguez

Minister of Small Business and Tourism
- In office November 4, 2015 – July 18, 2018
- Prime Minister: Justin Trudeau
- Preceded by: Maxime Bernier
- Succeeded by: Melanie Joly (Tourism); Mary Ng (Small Business)

Member of Parliament for Waterloo
- Incumbent
- Assumed office October 19, 2015
- Preceded by: Riding established

Personal details
- Born: April 6, 1980 (age 46) Kitchener, Ontario, Canada
- Party: Liberal
- Education: University of Waterloo
- Profession: Community organizer
- Website: bardishchaggermp.ca

Bardish Chagger (born April 6, 1980) is a Canadian politician who has served as the member of Parliament (MP) for Waterloo since 2015. A member of the Liberal Party, Chagger was the minister of small business and tourism from 2015 to 2018, Government House Leader from 2016 to 2019, and the minister of diversity, inclusion and youth from 2019 to 2021. Chagger is the first woman to serve as Government House Leader. Chagger is known for her role in the WE Charity scandal, which ultimately led to her removal from cabinet.

In the 2025 Liberal Party of Canada Leadership, Chagger declined to endorse any candidate in the race, despite almost 50 of her colleagues in the Ontario caucus declaring their preference in the race. After Mark Carney won the leadership and became Canada's next prime minister, Carney declined to return Chagger to Cabinet, extending her four-year absence from a ministerial position.

== Early life and education ==
Chagger's parents immigrated to Waterloo from Punjab, India, in the 1970s. Her family is Sikh. Her father, Gurminder "Gogi" Chagger, was active in the Liberal Party and an admirer of Prime Minister Pierre Trudeau. Chagger's first involvement in politics came in the 1993 federal election as a 13-year-old volunteer for Andrew Telegdi's successful campaign in Waterloo.

She attended the University of Waterloo, with aspirations to become a nurse, but she subsequently became an executive assistant to Telegdi, who represented Waterloo in the House of Commons for the Liberals from 1993 to 2008.

Chagger graduated from the University of Waterloo with a bachelor of science degree. After Telegedi's defeat in 2008, Chagger became a director of special events for the Kitchener-Waterloo Multicultural Centre.

== Federal politics ==
Chagger volunteered for Justin Trudeau's 2013 party leadership bid, and subsequently became the Liberal Party's candidate in the newly reconstituted Waterloo riding. She took 49.7% of the vote and defeated two-term Conservative incumbent Peter Braid, who had earlier ousted her former employer Andrew Telegdi.

=== Minister for Small Business and Tourism ===
On November 4, 2015, Chagger was sworn in as Minister of Small Business and Tourism.

As a result of the July 18, 2018 cabinet shuffle, Chagger's responsibilities for Small Business were given to Mary Ng, and Mélanie Joly took on the responsibilities of Tourism. She was later appointed to the role of Minister of Diversity and Inclusion and Youth, which she held until 2021.

=== Leader of the Government in the House of Commons ===
On August 19, 2016, Chagger was sworn in as Leader of the Government in the House of Commons replacing Dominic Leblanc in the position. She retained her responsibilities as Minister of Small Business and Tourism until the July 18, 2018 cabinet shuffle.

On March 10, 2017, Chagger in her role as Government House Leader released a discussion paper titled Modernization of the Standing Orders of the House of Commons which sought to implement different ways that House of Commons procedure and practice could be improved to be more accountable, predictable and available to all Members of Parliament, and the public. The modernization paper suggested reforms to the House of Commons such as the implementation of electronic voting, the curtailment of Friday sittings, the reformation of Question Period, including a Prime Minister's Question Period, changes to the process of prorogation, greater powers for the Speaker to separate votes and committee studies on omnibus bills and legislative programming.

Opposition members of Parliament were concerned with the reforms proposed in the discussion paper, in particular with proposals to implement legislative programming and the elimination or change of Friday sittings in the House of Commons. In late April 2017, Chagger sent a letter to her counterparts, then New Democratic Party House Leader Murray Rankin and Conservative House Leader Candice Bergen, to inform them that the government would be abandoning several of the key proposals that were part of the modernization paper, such as changes to the Friday sitting, legislative programming, and electronic voting. They would continue however with proposals that were explicitly part of the 2015 Liberal election platform, including the decision to have a Prime Minister's Question Period, requiring the government to issue a report following the use of prorogation, and allowing the speaker of the House of Commons to separate votes or committee studies on different parts of a bill that he or she deems to be omnibus.

=== WE Charity ethics investigation ===
In July 2020, Chagger was the first witness who testified in front of a parliamentary committee investigating the awarding of a sole-sourced contract to run the Canada Student Service Grant (CSSG) program to WE Charity, an organization with ties to Prime Minister Justin Trudeau and Finance Minister Bill Morneau. Chagger was the one who signed the contracts with WE Charity, and had met with WE Charity days before the student program was announced by Trudeau. Originally it was reported that WE Charity would get a payment of at least $19.5 million; later it was disclosed that the contract was paying them up to $43.5 million to run the student volunteer grant program. Chagger testified that it was the public service – specifically, Assistant Deputy Minister of Employment and Social Development Rachel Wernick – that recommended the grant program be outsourced to a third party via a contribution agreement.

=== Removal from Cabinet ===
Chagger was removed from Cabinet in 2021 as a part of cabinet reshuffle.

=== Committee Chair ===
On December 3, 2021, Chagger became Chair of the Canadian House of Commons Standing Committee on Procedure and House Affairs. She unexpectedly resigned from the committee on April 29, 2024.

== Electoral record ==
2025 Canadian federal election: Waterloo
** Preliminary results — Not yet official **
Party	Candidate	Votes	%	±%	Expenditures
Liberal	Bardish Chagger	37,580	59.49	+14.01	
Conservative	Waseem Botros	20,534	32.51	+5.07	
New Democratic	Héline Chow	2,620	4.15	–14.97	
Green	Simon Guthrie	1,602	2.54	–0.87	
People's	Douglas Ross	350	0.55	–4.00	
Independent	Val Neekman	180	0.28	N/A	
Rhinoceros	Santa Claus Chatham	119	0.19	N/A	
Independent	Hans Roach	104	0.16	N/A	
Independent	Jamie Hari	76	0.12	N/A	
Total valid votes/expense limit					
Total rejected ballots					
Turnout		63,165	72.39		
Eligible voters		87,261			
Liberal notional hold		Swing		+4.47	
Source: Elections Canada

2021 Canadian federal election: Waterloo
Party	Candidate	Votes	%	±%	Expenditures
Liberal	Bardish Chagger	26,926	45.1	-3.7	$107,712.63
Conservative	Meghan Shannon	16,528	27.7	+3.2	$61,976.35
New Democratic	Jonathan Cassels	11,360	19.0	+3.8	$11,709.64
People's	Patrick Doucette	2,802	4.7	+3.0	$7,490.55
Green	Karla Villagomez Fajardo	2,038	3.4	-6.3	$4,629.92
Total valid votes/expense limit		59,654	99.4	–	$115.523.52
Total rejected ballots		353	0.6		
Turnout		60,007	69.4		
Eligible voters		86,456			
Liberal hold		Swing		-3.5	
Source: Elections Canada

2019 Canadian federal election: Waterloo
Party	Candidate	Votes	%	±%	Expenditures
Liberal	Bardish Chagger	31,085	48.8	-0.9	$107,088.00
Conservative	Jerry Zhang	15,615	24.5	-7.8	$84,796.68
New Democratic	Lori Campbell	9,710	15.2	+0.3	none listed
Green	Kirsten Wright	6,184	9.7	+6.8	none listed
People's	Erika Traub	1,112	1.7	–	$5,385.50
Total valid votes/expense limit		63,706	100.0	–	112,180.38
Total rejected ballots		417	0.65	+0.33	
Turnout		64,123	74.76	-2.9	
Eligible voters		85,761			
Liberal hold		Swing		+3.45	
Source: Elections Canada, Global News

2015 Canadian federal election: Waterloo
Party	Candidate	Votes	%	±%	Expenditures
Liberal	Bardish Chagger	29,752	49.7	+11.38	$140,131.74
Conservative	Peter Braid	19,318	32.3	-9.08	$148,370.13
New Democratic	Diane Freeman	8,928	14.9	-0.04	$96,964.67
Green	Richard Walsh	1,713	2.9	-1.78	–
Animal Alliance	Emma Hawley-Yan	138	0.2	–	$4,066.17
Total valid votes/expense limit		59,849	100.0		$212,120.63
Total rejected ballots		198	–	–	
Turnout		60,047	–	–	
Eligible voters		77,312			
Source: Elections Canada

29th Canadian Ministry (2015–2025) – Cabinet of Justin Trudeau
Cabinet posts (3)
Predecessor	Office	Successor
Position established	Minister of Diversity and Inclusion and Youth; November 20, 2019 – October 26, 2021	Ahmed Hussen (Diversity and Inclusion); Marci Ien (Youth)
Dominic LeBlanc	Leader of the Government in the House of Commons; August 19, 2016 – November 20, 2019	Pablo Rodriguez
Maxime Bernier	Minister of Small Business and Tourism; November 4, 2015 – July 18, 2018	Mary Ng (Small Business); Melanie Joly (Tourism)
