= John Eden =

John Eden may refer to:

- John Eden, Baron Eden of Winton (1925–2020), British politician
- Sir John Eden, 2nd Baronet (died 1728), Member of Parliament for Durham
- Sir John Eden, 4th Baronet (1740–1812), Member of Parliament for Durham
- John R. Eden (1826–1909), U.S. Representative from Illinois
- John Eden (athlete) (born 1955), Paralympic athlete from Australia
- John Richard Eden (1859–19??), politician in Ontario, Canada
- John Eden (producer), a music producer, including for The Catch (album)
