= Chris Klassen =

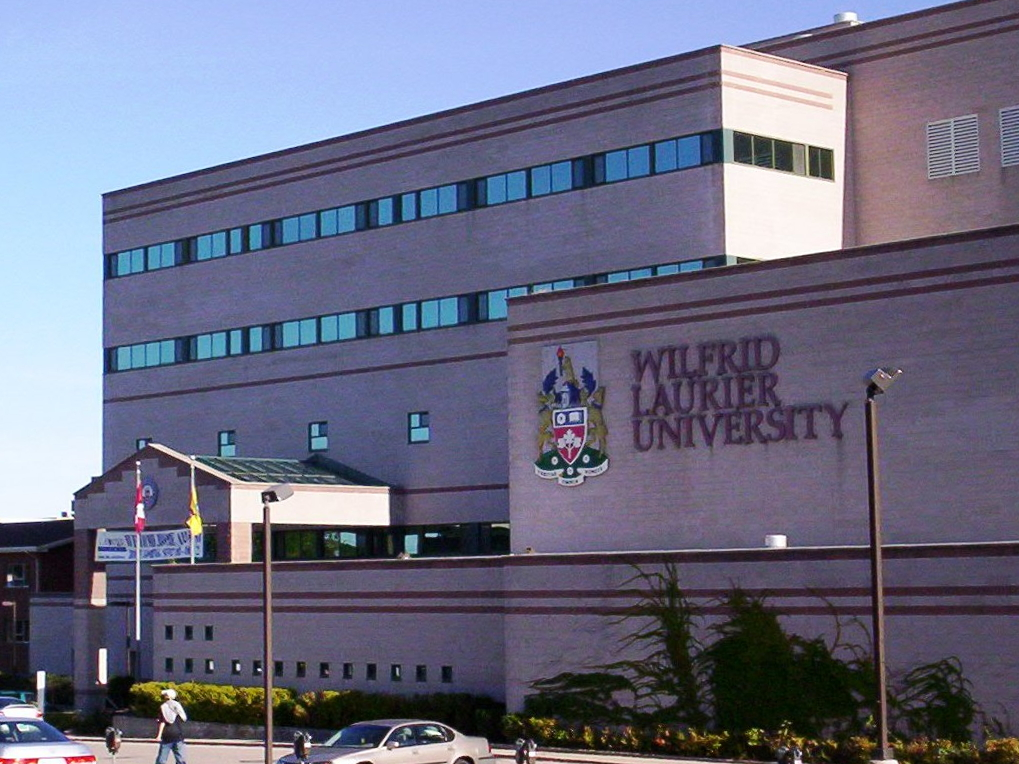
The main campus of Wilfrid Laurier University, in Waterloo, Ontario.

Christine "Chris" Klassen is an undergraduate instructor at Wilfrid Laurier University in Waterloo, Ontario, Canada in the department of Religion and Culture. Klassen's area of focus is on religion, culture and feminism. Klassen has completed comprehensive research in the area of "feminist witchcraft, Wicca and other forms of contemporary paganism."

== Career ==
Throughout 2002 - 2015, Klassen was an Undergraduate Instructor at multiple universities. From 1998 - 2006, Klassen was a Teaching Assistant at York University in Toronto, Ontario, and at Wilfrid Laurier University in Waterloo, Ontario. Between 2006 - 2012, Klassen became a Graduate Professor at Wilfrid Laurier. Throughout her teaching career, Klassen has also been a guest lecturer at other Canadian institutions such as York University in Toronto, Acadia University in Wolfville, Nova Scotia and at Wilfrid Laurier. While at York University, Klassen was a chair for a panel at Atkinson College on 'Mothering, Religion and Spirituality'. Between 2002 and 2003, Klassen was a research assistant at St. Jerome's University in Waterloo, ON.

== Education ==
Klassen graduated in 1998 with a B.A., Hons from the University of Waterloo with a major in Religious Studies. In 1999, Klassen received a Master's degree from Wilfrid Laurier University with her concentration being the "Interdisciplinary approaches to religion in the contemporary world." Finally, she earned her PhD in Women's Studies from York University in 2006. During her education, Klassen won multiple scholarships, including the Dean's Academic Excellence Scholarship at York University for the year 2000-2001, the York Scholarship in 1999-2000, the Ontario Graduate Scholarship for the same year, and finally the Graduate Scholarship at Wilfrid Laurier University for 1998-1999.

== Bibliography ==
=== Books ===
- Storied Selves: Shaping Identity in Feminist Witchcraft (2008, Lexington Books)
- Feminist Spirituality: The Next Generation (2009, editor, Lexington Books )
- Religion and Popular Culture: A Cultural Studies Approach (2014, Oxford University Press)

=== Book chapters ===
- The Myth Awakens: Canon, Conservatism, and Fan Reception of StarWars (2018, contributor - chapter ""Leia "the Hutt Slayer" and Rey "the next generation badass boss bitch."", Wipf and Stock Publishers)
