= Peter Braid =

Canadian businessman and politician

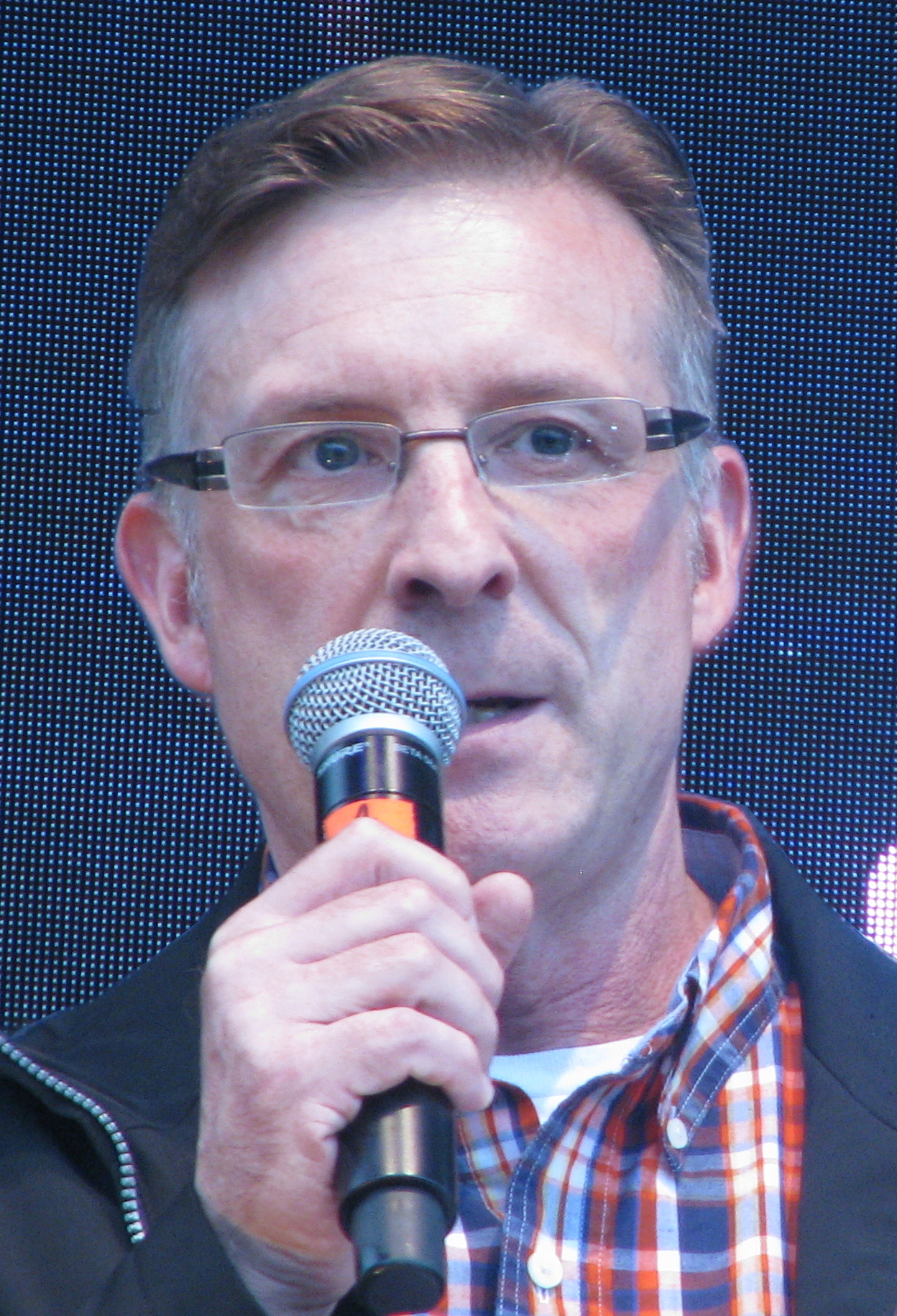

Member of Parliament for Kitchener—Waterloo
- In office 2008 – August 4, 2015
- Preceded by: Andrew Telegdi
- Succeeded by: riding dissolved

Personal details
- Born: January 7, 1964 (age 62) Kitchener, Ontario
- Party: Conservative

Peter Braid (born January 7, 1964) is a Canadian businessman and former politician, who served as the Member of Parliament for Kitchener—Waterloo from 2008 to 2015. While in office he served as Parliamentary Secretary for Infrastructure and Communities. He is a member of the Conservative Party of Canada.

== Career ==
Braid worked as a communications consultant and also in the constituency office of former MP Walter McLean, as an employee of the Immigration and Refugee Board. He later worked as director of operations at Sun Life Financial and as an Account Manager with Quarry Integrated Communications in Waterloo. He is a former member of the Waterloo Economic Development Committee and the board of the Conservative riding association in Kitchener—Waterloo.

He was elected to represent the electoral district of Kitchener—Waterloo in the 2008 Canadian federal election, defeating incumbent Andrew Telegdi by a margin of 17 votes. A judicial recount confirmed the margin of victory on November 1, 2008. On May 2, 2011, Braid was re-elected as Member of Parliament for Kitchener—Waterloo, this time defeating Telegdi by 2,144 votes. On September 19, 2014, he was appointed as Parliamentary Secretary for Infrastructure and Communities.

In the 2015 federal election, Braid sought re-election in the newly drawn district of Waterloo, which contained the bulk of his old district. He was defeated by Liberal candidate Bardish Chagger, a former staffer for Andrew Telegdi.

Political issues and record

On November 19, 2010, Braid tabled Motion 559 in the House of Commons, which asked the Standing Committee on Finance to review the charitable tax credit and the proposal to remove capital gains tax from donations of private company shares and real estate. On March 2, 2011, the House passed Braid's motion unanimously.

On October 1, 2012, Braid introduced Bill C-458 in the House of Commons, which would have established a National Charities Week in Canada, and amended the Income Tax Act to move the annual deadline for charitable donations for income tax purposes. Bill C-458 passed Second Reading in the House of Commons unanimously on May 29, 2013, but was later withdrawn upon Braid's appointment as Parliamentary Secretary. Under House of Commons rules, Parliamentary Secretaries are unable to sponsor Private Member's Business.

== Education ==
Braid attended both the University of Waterloo and the University of Toronto, graduating from the latter in 1989 with a degree in international relations.

== Electoral record ==
2015 Canadian federal election: Waterloo
Party	Candidate	Votes	%	±%	Expenditures
Liberal	Bardish Chagger	29,752	49.7	+11.38	$140,131.74
Conservative	Peter Braid	19,318	32.3	-9.08	$148,370.13
New Democratic	Diane Freeman	8,928	14.9	-0.04	$96,964.67
Green	Richard Walsh	1,713	2.9	-1.78	–
Animal Alliance	Emma Hawley-Yan	138	0.2	–	$4,066.17
Total valid votes/expense limit		59,849	100.0		$212,120.63
Total rejected ballots		198	–	–	
Turnout		60,047	–	–	
Eligible voters		77,312			
Source: Elections Canada

2011 Canadian federal election: Kitchener—Waterloo
Party	Candidate	Votes	%	±%	Expenditures
Conservative	Peter Braid	27,039	40.85	+4.79	$90,641.15
Liberal	Andrew Telegdi	24,895	37.62	+1.59	–
New Democratic	Bill Brown	10,606	16.03	+1.31	$21,334.44
Green	Cathy MacLellan	3,158	4.77	-7.33	–
Pirate	Steven Bradley Scott	245	0.37	–	–
Independent	Richard Walsh-Bowers	174	0.26	–	–
Marxist–Leninist	Julian Ichim	66	0.10	–	none listed
Total valid votes		66,183	100.00	–	
Total rejected ballots		216	0.33	-0.05	
Turnout		66,399	70.17	+7.86	
Eligible voters		94,624	–	–	

2008 Canadian federal election: Kitchener—Waterloo
Party	Candidate	Votes	%	±%	Expenditures
Conservative	Peter Braid	21,830	36.06	+7.75	$93,455
Liberal	Andrew Telegdi	21,813	36.03	-10.82	$71,443
New Democratic	Cindy Jacobsen	8,915	14.72	-3.16	$34,713
Green	Cathy MacLellan	7,326	12.10	+5.64	$19,781
Libertarian	Jason Cousineau	333	0.55	–	$0
Independent	Mark Corbiere	107	0.17	–	
Communist	Ramon Portillo	105	0.17	–	$373
Canadian Action	Kyle Huntingdon	105	0.17	–	$203
Total valid votes/expense limit		60,534	100.00	$95,412	
Total rejected ballots		229	0.38	–	
Turnout		60,763	62.31	-8.08	

== See also ==
- List of University of Waterloo people
