= Herb Epp =

Canadian politician

Mayor of Waterloo, Ontario
- In office 2003–2006
- Preceded by: Lynne Woolstencroft
- Succeeded by: Brenda Halloran

Ontario MPP
- In office 1977–1990
- Preceded by: Edward R. Good
- Succeeded by: Elizabeth Witmer
- Constituency: Waterloo North

Mayor of Waterloo, Ontario
- In office 1975–1977
- Preceded by: Donovan P. Meston
- Succeeded by: Marjorie Carroll

Alderman, Waterloo, Ontario
- In office 1968–1975

Personal details
- Born: August 31, 1934 Winnipeg, Manitoba
- Died: February 25, 2013 (aged 78) Waterloo, Ontario
- Party: Liberal Party of Ontario
- Education: Waterloo Lutheran University; University of Toronto
- Profession: real estate agent, teacher and guidance counsellor

Herbert Arnold Epp (August 31, 1934 – February 25, 2013) was a politician from Waterloo, Ontario, Canada. He served in the Legislative Assembly of Ontario as a Liberal from 1977 to 1990 and was a former three-term mayor of the City of Waterloo.

== Background ==
Born in Winnipeg, Manitoba, and raised in Ontario, Epp studied political science and history and received his BA degree from Waterloo Lutheran University in 1961. He went on to receive a Master of Education degree from the University of Toronto in 1972. Epp worked as a teacher and guidance counsellor for fifteen years with the Waterloo County Board of Education and worked occasionally as a supply teacher after finishing his career in provincial politics.

Along with teaching, Epp sold real estate starting in 1978 and maintained his realty licence through his 13 years at Queen's Park. During his absence from politics from 1990 to 2003, Epp returned to real estate and was an associate broker for ReMax Realty in Waterloo.

Epp died February 25, 2013, at the age of 78.

== Political career ==
First Epp was successful in local politics, serving as an alderman in Waterloo from 1968 to 1974, and two terms as the city's mayor from 1975 to 1977.

Epp ran for the House of Commons of Canada in the 1968 federal election as a Liberal candidate in the riding of Waterloo, finishing second to Max Saltsman of the NDP in a tight, three-way race.

Starting in 1977, he was elected four times to the Ontario legislature, representing the constituency of Waterloo North, and winning each time by a healthy margin. Epp was re-elected in 1981, and again in 1985.

The Liberals formed a minority government and Epp served as parliamentary assistant to the treasurer from 1985 to 1987. Epp was re-elected in 1987, defeating future Progressive Conservative cabinet minister Elizabeth Witmer. He served as chairman of the Liberal caucus from 1985 to 1987 and retired from the legislature in 1990.

In 1996, he supported Dalton McGuinty's successful bid to lead the Ontario Liberal Party.

Re-entering politics after a 13-year break, Epp was easily elected to a third term as mayor of Waterloo in November 2003, receiving double the number of votes cast for incumbent Lynne Woolstencroft. During his term, he helped oversee the continuing redevelopment of Waterloo Square, initiated by Mayor Joan McKinnon (1997–2000) and a multimillion-dollar library/YMCA project on University of Waterloo lands on the west side of the city. This 98 year land lease included lands which would favour multiple sports fields to serve primarily the youth of Waterloo. He ran for re-election in November 2006, but was defeated by political newcomer Brenda Halloran.
