= Lori Campbell =

Cree-Métis educator

- Born: Regina, Saskatchewan
- Education: First Nations University of Canada; University of Regina
- Employer: University of Regina

Lori Campbell is a Two-Spirit Cree-Métis educator and advocate from Treaty 6 territory in Northern Saskatchewan and a member of Montreal Lake First Nation. She was appointed the inaugural associate vice-president Indigenous Engagement in 2021 at the University of Regina. From 2017 – 2021, she was the Director of Shatitsirótha' Waterloo Indigenous Student Centre at the University of Waterloo and an adjunct lecturer in Indigenous Studies at United College. Campbell holds undergraduate degrees in Indigenous Studies and Psychology and a master's degree in Adult Education from First Nations University of Canada and the University of Regina. Her MA thesis, completed in 2016, was titled Nikawiy: A Cree Woman's Experience. She is currently pursuing a PhD in Social Justice Education at the University of Toronto's Ontario Institute for Studies in Education.

Campbell is one of the estimated 20,000 Indigenous peoples in Canada to have lived through the Sixties Scoop. Born in Regina, Saskatchewan she was placed into foster care by child welfare officials at 14-months-old and was later adopted by a white family. Although she grew up in rural Saskatchewan knowing she was Métis, she wasn't encouraged by her family to learn about her heritage. She began the search for her family in 1991, after returning to Regina to attend university. It took eight years to locate her mother, Brenda Campbell. Reconnecting with her mother led to a decades long search for 6 younger siblings, who were also taken from her mother and placed in the child welfare system. After locating five of her six siblings, she turned to social media in 2014 for assistance finding a brother that had been adopted in the mid-1970s. A Facebook post requesting help finding him was shared more than 20,000 times and eventually led to locating him in Northern Ontario.

Campbell was nominated as the federal NDP candidate for the electoral district of Waterloo in July 2019. At the time of her nomination, she was believed to be the first Two-Spirit person to seek election to the House of Commons. Campbell placed third in the riding, receiving 15.17% of the popular vote.

== Personal life ==
Campbell lives in Regina with her partner. Growing up she developed a strong connection with horses and the land, which she considers a form of therapy. In addition to two dogs, she has a horse named Sunrise that she credits for keeping her mentally and physically healthy.

== Electoral record ==
2019 Canadian federal election: Waterloo
Party	Candidate	Votes	%	±%	Expenditures
Liberal	Bardish Chagger	31,085	48.8	-0.9	$107,088.00
Conservative	Jerry Zhang	15,615	24.5	-7.8	$84,796.68
New Democratic	Lori Campbell	9,710	15.2	+0.3	none listed
Green	Kirsten Wright	6,184	9.7	+6.8	none listed
People's	Erika Traub	1,112	1.7	–	$5,385.50
Total valid votes/expense limit		63,706	100.0	–	112,180.38
Total rejected ballots		417	0.65	+0.33	
Turnout		64,123	74.76	-2.9	
Eligible voters		85,761			
Liberal hold		Swing		+3.45	
Source: Elections Canada, Global News

== Select publications ==
- Campbell, Lori (2010). "Two-fold participation: Dialogue with self.. Heartbeat of Mother Earth..". In Anderson, A. Brenda; Kubik, Wendee; Hampton, Mary Rucklos (eds.). Torn from our midst : voices of grief, healing and action from the Missing Indigenous Women Conference, 2008. Canadian Plains Research Center. ISBN 9780889772236.
- Campbell, Lori; Dea, Shannon; McDonald, Laura (9 May 2019). "The role of faculty associations following the Truth and Reconciliation Commission". Academic Matters (Sprin 2019).
