= Ward Bowlby =

Canadian lawyer and politician

Ward Hamilton Bowlby KC
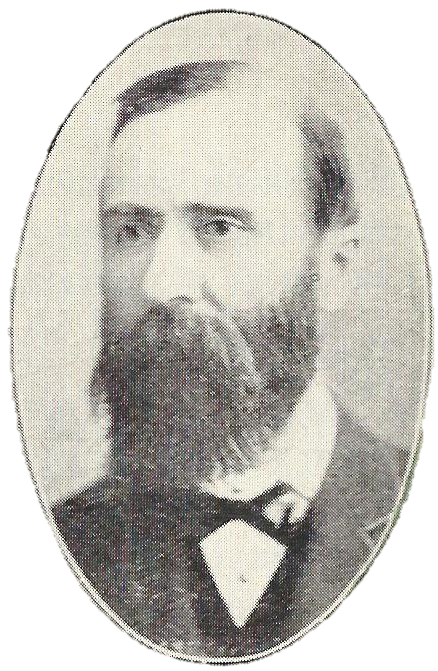
- Bowlby, 1912

Town Councillor of Berlin, Ontario
- In office 1865

Reeve of Berlin, Ontario
- In office 1865–1868
- Preceded by: Henry S. Huber
- Succeeded by: Hugo Kranz

Personal details
- Born: 4 October 1834 Waterford, Townsend Township, Norfolk County, Upper Canada
- Died: 8 January 1917 (aged 82) Kitchener, Ontario, Canada
- Spouse: Lissie Hespeler (m. 1861)
- Children: Annie Hespeler Bowlby
- Parents: Adam Bowlby (father); Elizabeth Sovereign (mother)
- Education: Upper Canada College; University of Toronto
- Occupation: Lawyer

Ward Hamilton Bowlby KC (October 4, 1834 – January 8, 1917) was a Canadian lawyer and politician. He served as reeve of Berlin from 1865 to 1868.

The son of Adam Bowlby and Elizabeth Sovereign, both of United Empire Loyalist descent, he was born in Townsend township, Norfolk County, Upper Canada and was educated in Simcoe, Streetsville and St. Thomas, at Upper Canada College in Toronto and at the University of Toronto. He articled in law with a firm in Toronto and was called to the Ontario bar in 1858. Bowlby then set up practice in Berlin. In 1876, he founded the firm Bowlby, Colquhoun and Clement.

He served on the town and county councils and on the Berlin public school board. In 1862, he was named registrar for South Waterloo. In 1867, Bowlby was named Crown Attorney and clerk of the peace for Waterloo County. He was named King's Counsel. Bowlby retired from the practice of law in 1903.

In 1861, Bowlby married Lissie, the daughter of Jacob Hespeler. His daughter Annie Hespeler Bowlby married George Perley. Bowlby died on January 8, 1917, and was buried at Mount Hope Cemetery in Kitchener.

== See also ==
- George Bowlby – his nephew
- List of mayors of Kitchener, Ontario
