= St. Jerome's University =

Public university in Waterloo, Ontario, Canada

Coordinates: 43°28′9″N 80°32′44″W

- Type: Public
- Established: 1865 as St. Jerome College
- Affiliations: University of Waterloo
- Religious affiliation: Roman Catholic and Jesuit
- Academic affiliations: AUCC, IAU, COU, ATS, CIS, CUSID
- Students: 1019 (835 full-time and 184 part-time)
- Location: Waterloo, Canada
- Campus: Urban/suburban, campus of University of Waterloo 400 ha (990 acres)
- Mascot: Jerome – a lion
- Website: www.sju.ca

St. Jerome's University (commonly shortened to St. Jerome's or SJU) is a public Roman Catholic university in Waterloo, Ontario, Canada. It is federated with the University of Waterloo. St. Jerome's, within the University of Waterloo, combines academics and a residence. Students may both reside at and take classes through St. Jerome's, live at SJU in residence but take classes elsewhere, or live in another residence but take classes at St. Jerome's.

== History ==
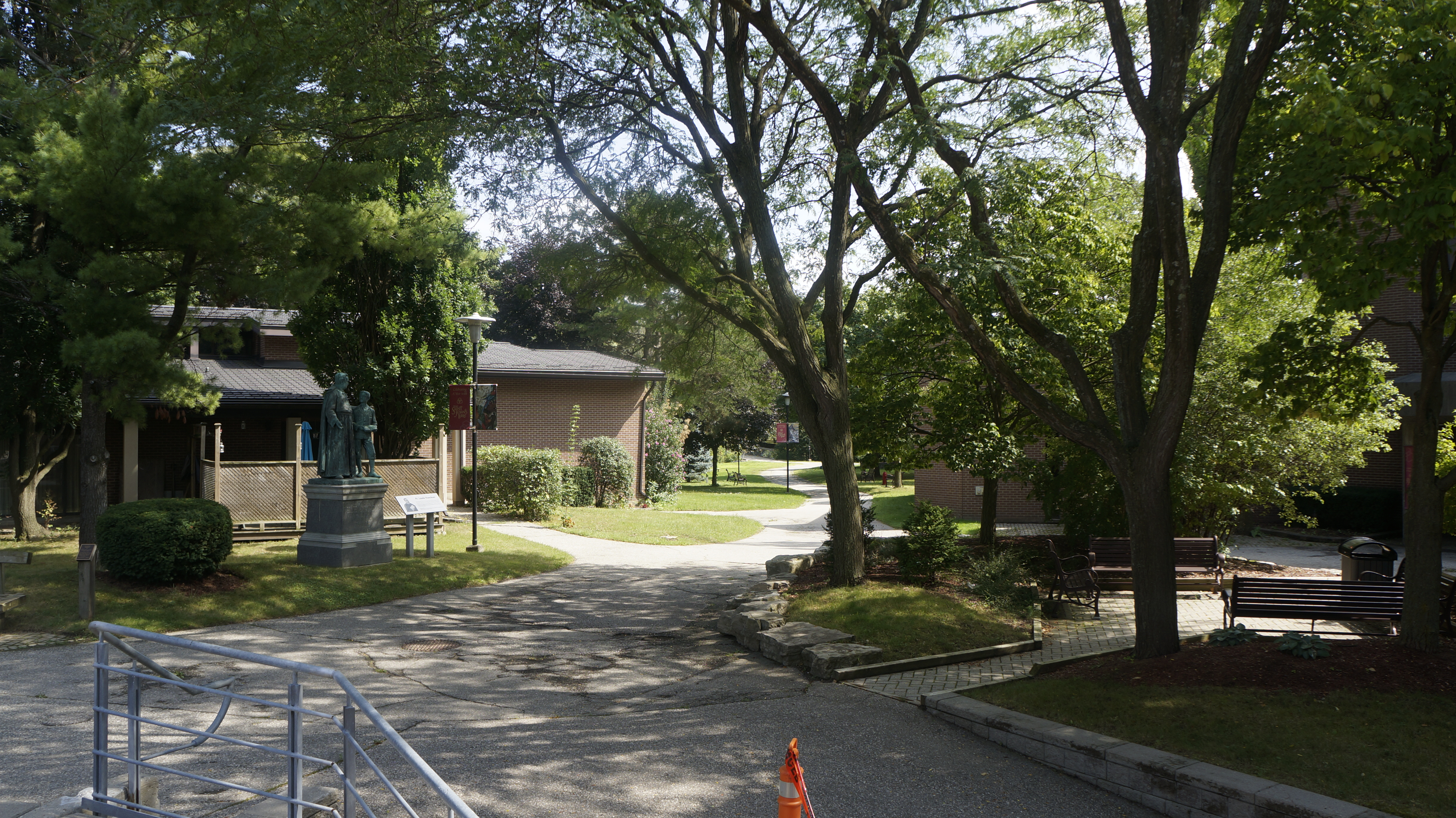
The Choate Common featuring the statue of the Fr. Louis Funcken, CR.

=== Nineteenth century ===
Reverend Dr. Louis Funcken and his brother, Friar Eugene Funcken – both Fathers of the Resurrectionist Congregation – founded St. Jerome's College in 1865. Originally a log cabin school house on Erb's Road in St. Agatha, the school moved to Duke Street in Berlin in 1867. The building was rebuilt and renovated several times, in 1881, 1889, 1907 and 1958. The school is the oldest post-secondary institution in the community. Originally founded to serve German Roman Catholics in Waterloo County, the school initially offered only two courses of study: a four year academic program designed to prepare students for professional studies or for the priesthood, and a two-year commercial program teaching Catholic business.

=== Twentieth century ===
In 1937 Joseph Francis Ryan, a St. Jerome's College alumnus, was consecrated as Bishop of Hamilton, a diocese which included both Kitchener and Waterloo. Ryan pushed for the establishment of a Catholic liberal arts university within the diocese. In 1943, Ryan began a fund-raising campaign to finance the development of SJC, intending to bring it to university status. Ryan explained: "In the postwar years, St. Jerome's is planning a program of expansion which will bring her to the status which is her destiny as the Catholic College of the Diocese of Hamilton ... As soon as conditions warrant after Victory, St. Jerome's, through an expansion program, will offer courses with university recognition." Local businesses sponsored full-page advertisements supporting SJC's efforts to become a university. By the end of 1948, fundraising contributions exceeded $2 million (equivalent to CA$28,000,000 in 2025). Ryan pledged only $250,000 of the funds, holding the rest until the initiation of the college's building project.

On 20 February 1947 the SJC Board of Governors approved the purchase of property at Centreville (later Kingsdale) on the eastern boundary of Kitchener. SJC initially considered making an affiliation with Western University. For unclear reasons these plans were not followed up on.

Carleton University became another option, although SJC President, Father Weiler, preferred the University of Ottawa. In April 1947 the Senate of the University of Ottawa agreed to affiliate with SJC. In 1948, SJC started offering a university arts program and began admitting women. By 1949 SJC announced plans to expand, anticipating construction the following year of a residence building and a building for administration and teaching. Construction began on the Kingsdale campus in September 1952 and was completed in 1953. Ontario Premier Leslie Frost attended the opening of the college's arts building and library on 7 September 1953. The same day SJC outlined plans for future science and business faculties. Father Cornelius Siegfried was appointed rector of SJC the same year.

In 1953, Gerald Hagey, a Lutheran, complained that "[it was] unfortunate for me, that when I became President of Waterloo College, St. Jerome's was so far ahead of the Lutherans with its building program", and later recalled, "some of the Protestant people [were complaining that] it was a shame Waterloo [College] had let St. Jerome's get ahead of them."

Due to its denominational status as a Catholic institution, SJC was ineligible for provincial funding. To get around this, a new organization called the Waterloo College Associate Faculties was founded in 1955. The board consisted of prominent businessmen from Kitchener and Waterloo, including Ira Needles, industrialist Henry C. Krug and Kitchener-Waterloo Record editor John E. Motz. In 1956, the Canada Synod of the Lutheran Church agreed to an affiliation agreement of the Associate Faculties with Waterloo College. Siegfried agreed to the same proposal the next day. On the advice of his minister for education, W. J. Dunlop, Premier Frost granted university status to SJC in March 1959. That same month Waterloo North MPP John Wintermeyer introduced a private member's bill in Ontario's Legislative Assembly establishing the University of SJC, the University of Waterloo and Waterloo Lutheran University. After four years of negotiations SJC and Waterloo College federated with the University of Waterloo on 1 July 1960.

In January 1959, the SJC board of governors voted to purchase 55 acres of land north of Waterloo College's campus, bordered by Columbia Street. The purchase was suspended in June when the University of Waterloo provided SJC with land on their 200-acre campus. A new SJC building was built on the Waterloo campus in 1960. The original Duke Street location became known as SJC High School while the University of Waterloo affiliate became the University of St. Jerome's College. SJC High School closed in 1990 and acquired by Wilfrid Laurier University with it reopening as the home for Social Work in 2006.

In 1993, the men's residence building was named after Father John Finn, the dean and registrar in 1960.

In 1998 St. Jerome's College changed its name to St. Jerome's University.

=== Twenty-first century ===
In April 2015 construction began on a $47 million campus project, adding a seven-storey student residence and a two-storey academic building.

== Programs ==
St. Jerome's University offers undergraduate courses in the faculties of Arts, in 12 scholastic disciplines, and in 4 interdisciplinary areas (Italian Studies, Legal Studies, Medieval Studies, and Sexuality, Marriage, and Family Studies). St. Jerome's has a "Master of Catholic Thought" program aimed primarily at Catholic social leaders. In 2008, the St. Jerome's Centre for Responsible Citizenship was launched to support community-based learning, international service learning, community development research, and public education. Beyond Borders is the name of the international service learning program at SJU.

== Scholarships and bursaries ==
The Government of Canada sponsors an Aboriginal Bursaries Search Tool that lists over 680 scholarships, bursaries, and other incentives offered by governments, universities, and industry to support Aboriginal post-secondary participation. St. Jerome's University scholarships for Aboriginal, First Nations and Métis students include: Sundance Aboriginal Student Award

== Notable alumni ==
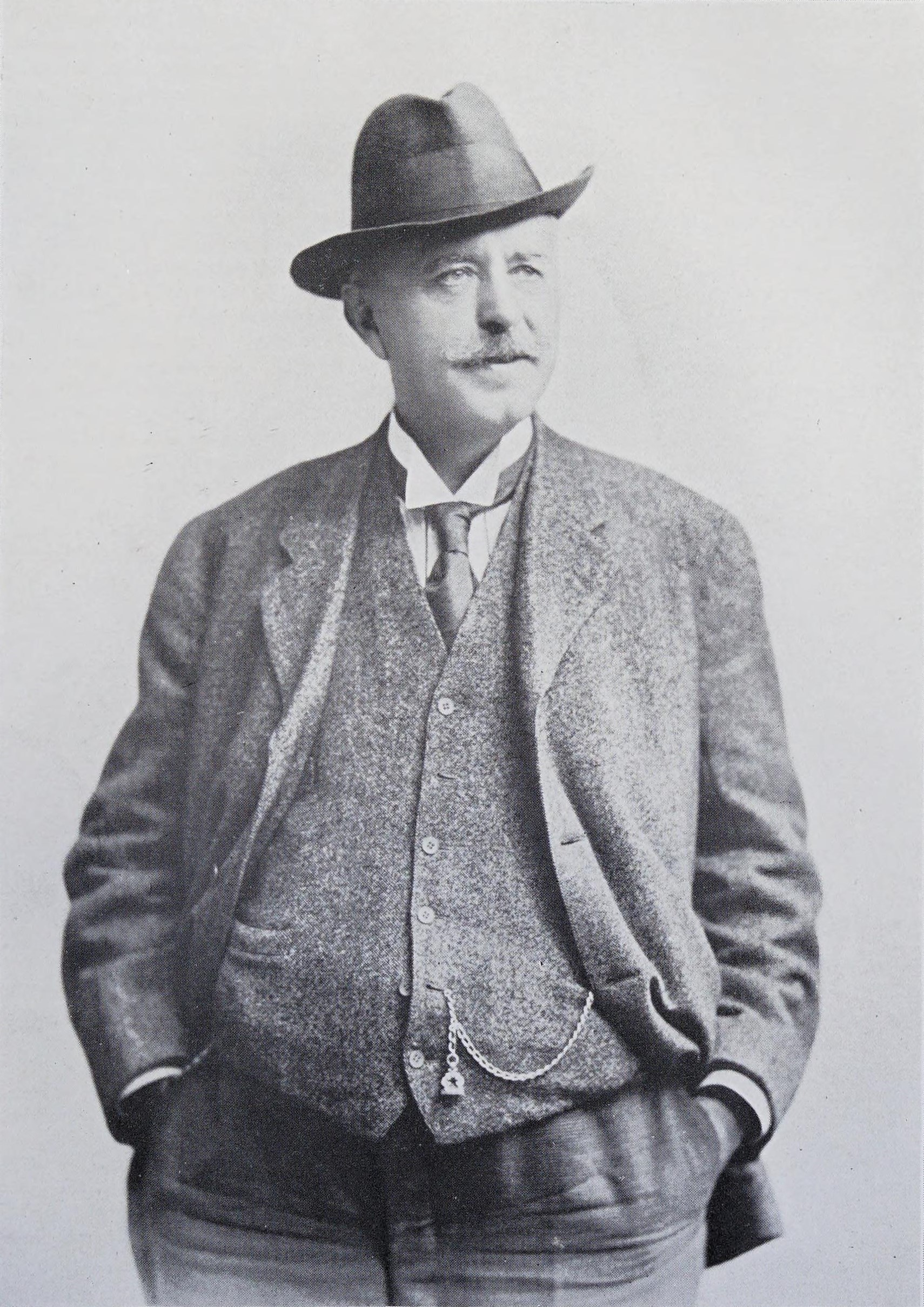
John Adam Rittinger, editor of Die Ontario Glocke and the Berliner Journal

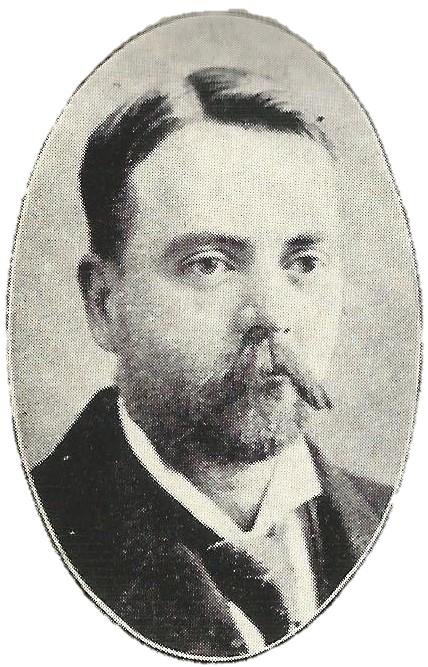
George Bowlby, physician, surgeon, politician and military officer

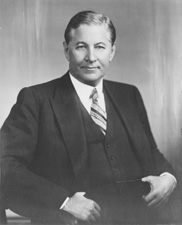
James E. Murray, United States Senator from Montana

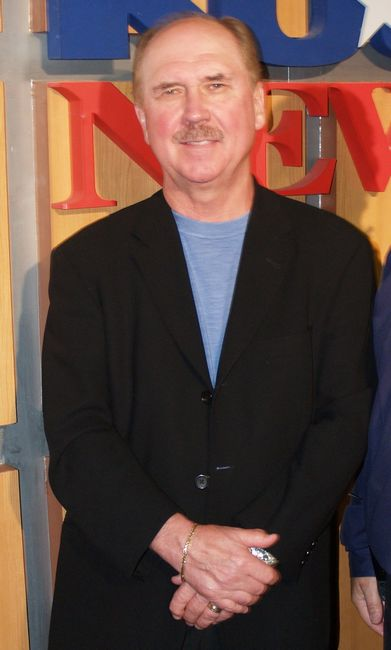
David Morrell, Canadian-American novelist

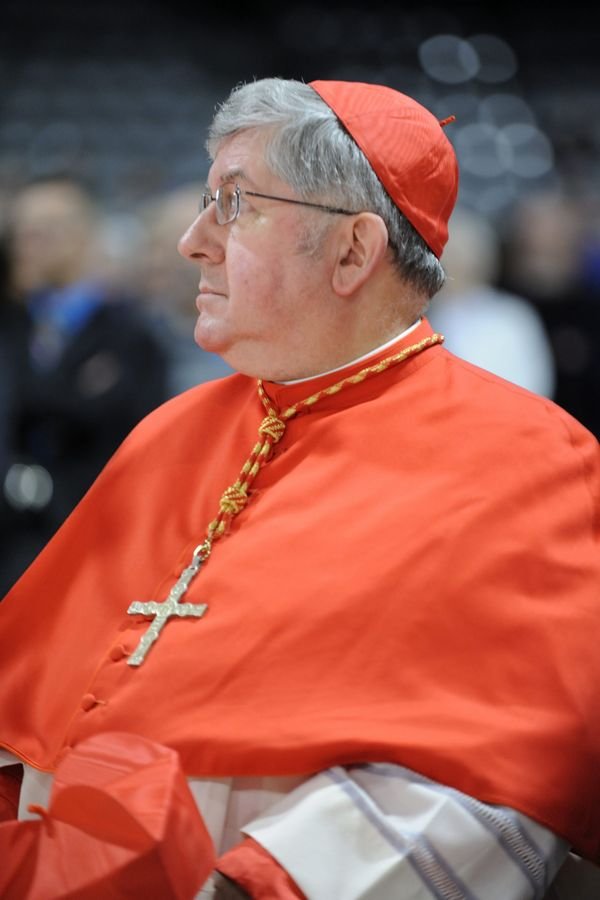
Thomas Christopher Collins, cardinal of the Catholic Church, Archbishop of Toronto

== Sources ==
- McLaughlin, Kenneth (1997). Waterloo: The Unconventional Founding of an Unconventional University (1st ed.). Waterloo: University of Waterloo. ISBN 978-0968282700.
- McLaughlin, Kenneth; Jaeger, Sharon (2007). Waterloo: An Illustrated History, 1857-2007. Waterloo: City of Waterloo. ISBN 978-0-9691175-1-3.
- Stortz, G. J.; Wahl, J. A. Enthusiasm for the Truth. St. Jerome's College: Unpublished.
