= Jacob Yost Shantz =

Canadian businessman

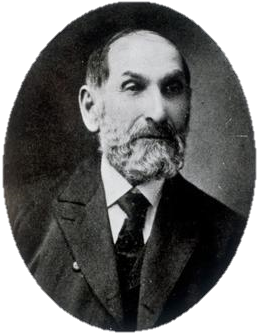
- Shantz, c. 1880
- Born: 2 May 1822; Ebytown, Upper Canada
- Died: 28 October 1909 (aged 87)
- Burial place: First Mennonite Cemetery, Kitchener, Ontario, Canada
- Other names: Jakob Yost Shantz
- Occupations: Farmer; Businessman; Industrialist
- Spouses: Barbara Biehn; Anna "Nancy" Brubacher; Sarah Shuh
- Children: 15
- Parents: Jacob Shantz (father); Mary Yost (mother)

Mayor of Berlin, Ontario
- In office 1882
- Preceded by: John Motz
- Succeeded by: William Jaffray

Jacob Yost Shantz (2 May 1822 – 28 October 1909) was a Mennonite farmer, businessman, and industrialist from Ontario, Canada. He played a significant role in the urban development of Berlin, Ontario (which is now the city of Kitchener), where he held a succession of civic roles over a period of almost three decades, culminating in a term as mayor in 1882. Over the span of his life, Berlin was transformed from a rural agricultural settlement known as Ebytown into a bustling manufacturing centre; this was a change mirrored by Shantz, who began his adult life as a farmer and sawmiller, and ended it as a prominent local industrialist.

Late in his life, he travelled to the newly-colonized province of Manitoba, and subsequently helped tens of thousands of Russian Mennonites to immigrate there from the Russian Empire.

== Biography ==
=== Early life and business ===
Jacob Yost Shantz was born and raised in Ebytown, Upper Canada, which later evolved into the city of Kitchener, Ontario. He was the sixth son of Jacob Shantz and Mary (or Maria) Yost, who were Mennonites from Montgomery County, Pennsylvania. His paternal great-grandfather was an earlier Jacob Shantz, who had been born around 1710 in modern-day Switzerland and emigrated to Montgomery County by the mid-18th century. Jacob and Mary purchased land in the Ebytown area in 1810 as a part of the original wave of Mennonite settlement in the German Company Tract led by Benjamin Eby. They established a 448-acre (181-hectare) farm, which would later be subdivided amongst their sons, following Mennonite custom. In 1829, the senior Jacob began operating a sawmill near his farmstead (Note: Near the modern-day intersection of Charles Street East and Borden Street in Kitchener.) which was powered by a now-disappeared tributary of Schneider Creek called Shantz Creek. The mill was an early competitor for Joseph Schneider's sawmill.

Little was recorded about Shantz's childhood, but it was likely typical for the children of pioneer families in the area at the time. Pioneer youths were usually kept busy with farm duties such as carrying water, caring for animals, and chopping wood. Shantz received a basic education several months at a time during the winter, when less labour was required on farms. As his brothers reached adulthood, they dispersed to carve out their own farms from the heavily forested wilderness of the German Company Tract. Jacob's eldest brother, Isaac, was married at eighteen to Catharine Clemens and started his own farm across the Grand River. One of Jacob's younger brothers, Samuel, joined him there around a decade later with his own wife, Esther Erb. The Grand Trunk Railway mainline was later routed through Samuel's land, which became the site of a short-lived railway station called Shantz Station. A post office was also opened and there were plans for a village, but this never materialized and both the post office and railway station later closed.

As Jacob's older brothers left home and cleared their land for farming, he accompanied them to help maintain their camps and assist in clearing; by fifteen, he was highly skilled at the felling of timber. On his twenty-first birthday, Jacob married his cousin, Barbara Biehn, and soon took over his parents' farm. He later took over the management of his father's sawmill, likely sometime between 1845 and 1851, which "launched [his] entrepreneurial and civic career." The legal transfer of ownership of the mill did not occur until the senior Jacob died in 1867.

Around the time he took over management of the sawmill, Shantz began a partnership with two of Benjamin Eby's sons, Christian and Elias. The three partners owned a workshop enterprise called the Farmers' Manufactory. It was sold in 1851 to a series of businessmen, and eventually was used for furniture manufacturing. At the time it was sold, the property was valued at C£775, which was "no small sum." In exchange for the workshop, the partners received two properties along King Street in Berlin, marking the beginning of Shantz' involvement in the real estate business. These properties contained three dwellings, three barns, a blacksmith shop, and another workshop. Shantz was the active partner and was therefore the one who managed these assets.

Soon, Shantz became involved in the transformation of Ebytown, a rural village, into "Busy Berlin", a growing industrial town. Timber sources around the town became scarce as it developed, weakening the local lumber business. Local sawmills also began to be out-competed by steam-powered sawmills located in more rural areas, which had more direct access to timber. Adapting to these challenges, Shantz rebuilt his father's water-powered sawmill completely shortly after taking it over. When the rebuilding was complete, the mill was valued at C£150 and was said to produce 200,000 board feet (470 m^{3}) of lumber per year, while employing two workmen. The older Schneider mill, in contrast, was valued at C£200, but produced only 100,000 board feet (240 m^{3}) of lumber per year, and only employed one workman. Shantz also purchased several woodlots in the early 1850s, (Note: One of the most notable of Shantz's land acquisitions was a 200-acre (81-hectare) woodland situated along the road to Bridgeport, which was purchased from Henry Erb in November 1850 for a price of C£841. This area had a number of very large pines, which were harvested slowly and thus continued to provide timber for Shantz's sawmill for many years. Some of the pines had trunks up to 6 feet (1.8 m) in diameter, and stood 150 feet (46 m) tall.) but needed customers. Luckily for him, Berlin's urban development accelerated through the 1850s, especially after the arrival of the Grand Trunk Railway to Berlin in 1856, whose wood-burning steam locomotives made the Grand Trunk an obvious customer for Shantz' business. He also sold building materials to recently-arrived immigrants who were building homes in the settlement.

In 1854, Berlin reached 1,000 inhabitants; thus, it was able to become a village and to engage in municipal self-governance. Public offices were created, with Shantz being elected to be a school trustee. The village council soon engaged in a campaign of sidewalk-building. Shantz successfully bid on the construction contract and was subsequently paid C£300 for building sidewalks along portions of King Street, Foundry Street, (Note: Foundry Street was later renamed to Ontario Street.) Weber Street, and Frederick Street. The sidewalks were constructed out of pine lumber to a standard width of 6 feet (1.8 m) for secondary streets and 7 feet (2.1 m) on King Street. Shantz spent the next several years building numerous additional sidewalks in the village, receiving hundreds of pounds per year for his work and the value of his lumber. This was significant in helping to create a unified settlement out of the initial cluster of farmsteads and businesses strung out along King Street and in the surrounding area. (Note: One early elevated sidewalk was recalled decades later in reminiscences published by the Waterloo Historical Society. It was 6 feet (1.8 m) wide and built upon cedar posts, and it allowed for easier travel along the stretch of King Street between its modern-day intersections with Ontario Street and Queen Street. During the pioneer era, that area was a "spongy swamp" lined with willow trees. The street front was rapidly developed during the mid- to late 1850s, with the Victoria Block, Spiers Block, and other commercial buildings all constructed during a span of only a few years.) During the 1850s, Shantz also periodically acted as the village tax collector and tax assessor.

=== Developer ===
==== Berlin's windmill ====
The year 1861 saw Shantz diversifying his business further, and becoming more directly involved in real estate development. A miller named Friedrich Ludwig Rickermann (Note: Rickermann's name is sometimes Anglicized as Frederick Rickerman in records and histories, a common pattern among German settlers who were assimilating to the English systems which were in place in Canada.) had recently immigrated to the area from Mecklenburg (now a part of modern-day Germany), and wanted to construct a wind-powered gristmill similar to one he had operated in his homeland. Shantz offered Rickermann relatively generous terms for the construction of the windmill, and only took a minimal upfront payment. This began a short-lived venture in grist milling, a first for Berlin, as well as the construction of its first and only windmill. For a generation, farmers in the area had brought their grain to the mill in Waterloo which had been founded by Abraham Erb. The windmill was constructed on the top of Berlin's highest hill, which was soon known as the Mecklenburg Hill. (Note: Located at the southwest corner of modern-day Church Street and Madison Street South.) When complete, it was 60 feet (18 m) tall, and its three sets of millstones could produce four bushels of flour, two bushels of barley, and twenty-five bushels of schrot (crushed grain or grist) per hour. Its operations were initially run by a company composed of Shantz and other local businessmen. Many years later, the local historian Jacob Gaukel Stroh recalled eating bread baked from the first flour produced by the mill, and that the quality of flour was claimed to be particularly fine. In October 1861, Rickermann purchased the windmill and the land it sat upon outright from Shantz, but later sold it to a man named August or Augustus Boehm in early 1863. Boehm soon defaulted on the mortgage for the mill and absconded in 1864. The mill became derelict and was soon demolished. Control of the mill property reverted to Shantz, who was only able to salvage a $9 rebate on property taxes for the mill in 1865. In 1874, the land was auctioned and Shantz and Charles Boehmer each received a half-share.

==== Canadian Block ====
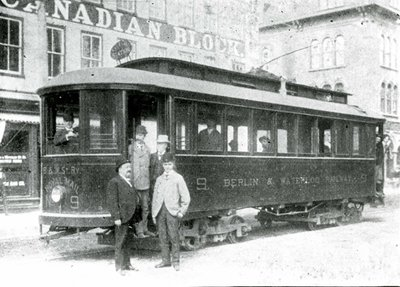
The rebuilt Canadian Block is visible in the background of this 1905 photo of men posing with a Berlin and Waterloo Street Railway car.

Also in 1861, Shantz took a major step in developing his own real estate projects when he bought property at the corner of King Street and Foundry Street near the centre of Berlin's growing downtown. On this site, he constructed the Canadian Block. While it was not Berlin's first large commercial building, but it was the most prestigious, and symbolized Shantz's upbeat "white collar" debut. As he became increasingly more involved in the business and governance of the village, Shantz was criticized in the local press for his close association with the village council and his role as a perennial municipal contractor. In particular, the Berlin Telegraph challenged the payment of $120.23 to Shantz by the village council to build an open drain which would direct factory discharge water away from Shantz's own Canadian Block, whose major tenant at the time was a village councillor. The newspaper article argued that the drain would primarily be for Shantz' benefit, and "'suspicious transactions' were implied." Little came of this, however.

Several years later, disaster struck for Shantz and for his Canadian Block. Early in the morning of 22 March 1865, a fire began in the pharmacy which was located on the corner of the first floor. It soon spread to other parts of the first floor, as well as the upper floors. By the time the fire was discovered and firefighting equipment had arrived, the building was lost, and all efforts were focused on preventing the fire from spreading to nearby buildings, such as Jacob Hoffman's factory on the other side of Foundry Street. Notable losses from the fire included Heinrich Bachmann's photography studio, J. Webster Hancock's law office on the second floor (including all books and documents), and the Mechanics' Institute library on the third floor.

Shantz was faced with the loss of a $6000 building on which he had no insurance. Private insurance was traditionally discouraged within Mennonite communities, though mutual aid was permitted as a means for the community to help bear the burdens of the individual. Ontario Mennonites had generally discussed provisions for fire assistance in the past, but no concrete actions had been taken. However, within a month of the fire, the Mennonite ministers and deacons in the Waterloo district passed a resolution encouraging deacons to conduct appraisals of damage in the case of fires, and to encourage church members to contribute to support the victim of the fire.

The building was soon rebuilt in brick, and was later sold to the Breithaupt family in 1888. Today, it is one of the oldest surviving commercial buildings along King Street West in downtown Kitchener.

==== Other projects ====
Shantz became involved in numerous other development projects in the town, one of the most notable being the 1869 construction of a multi-use civic building designed to serve as a town hall, public library, and market. As early as 1859, Shantz had been a supporter of a central farmers' market in Berlin, but the village council at the time was not ready to act. Soon after it was constructed, the building was quickly outgrown, with the market relocating to a new dedicated building in 1872; it would gradually evolve into the Kitchener Farmer's Market. The original 1869 building continued to house the Berlin Town Hall and Berlin Public Library until the construction of a Carnegie library on Queen Street in 1904, with the library soon relocating to the new building. In 1924, a newer grand city hall (the predecessor of the current Kitchener City Hall) was constructed directly behind the old town hall, and the latter was finally demolished.

=== Industrialist ===
In 1870, Shantz built a button factory for the business partners Emil Vogelsang and John Jacob Woelfle. Vogelsang was a young immigrant who had been born in Baden in what is now modern-day Germany. He arrived in Berlin in 1867. A button turner by trade, he formed a partnership with the merchant H. S. Huber and began his own button company, named the Pioneer Button Works, using a room leased from the Simpson Furniture Company. This was the first button factory in Canada. Vogelsang soon formed another partnership to help with the construction of a new factory, this time with John Jacob Woelfle, and the two partners awarded Shantz a $20,000 contract for the construction of their factory. Only seven months later, Shantz purchased Woelfle's share of the company, marking his entry into the manufacturing industry. In 1871, the company had a workforce of twenty-seven people, who were mostly women and children. Shantz's original seven-year contract with Vogelsang expired in 1875, and Shantz took the factory for himself, with Vogelsang having a new button factory built on Queen Street South. Shantz, now around sixty years old, involved his sons in the management of the business, especially Dilman B. Shantz, who would ultimately succeed him in running the company. Through the 1870s and 1880s, the company was known variously as the Dominion Button Works or the Shantz Button Manufacturing Company; in 1891, it was incorporated as the Jacob Y. Shantz & Son Company Limited. Its workforce ballooned to over 140 workers in 1880, and by 1910, it was the largest employer in Berlin. The company originally used natural materials such as vegetable ivory (imported from South America) and mother of pearl (harvested within the wider region from freshwater shells in the Grand and Thames Rivers), but this was later supplanted by casein, Bakelite, and ultimately, plastic, which was introduced in the 1940s after the company was taken over by the Gross family and renamed to the Dominion Button Manufacturers Limited. The company shut down completely in 1964.

=== Travels to Manitoba ===
In 1872, Shantz accompanied Bernhard Warkentin, a Russian Mennonite, on an exploratory trip to the newly formed province of Manitoba. He had been asked by the Canadian government to oversee this exploration. After his visit to Manitoba, Shantz sent a report of his findings to the government. Immigration officials liked the report and requested a more detailed account. The results of this request was a report called Narrative of a journey to Manitoba. When published and translated into various languages, this narrative became promotional literature for European immigration to Canada. After a delegation of Mennonites visited Manitoba in 1873 they signed a Privilegium with the Canadian government, and 21,000 Mennonites immigrated to Manitoba beginning in 1874 with the formation of the East Reserve and later the West Reserve. Shantz helped erect immigration sheds near what is now Niverville, Manitoba, temporary homes for the new immigrants. A cairn and plaque at this location was placed in 2020. A community in Manitoba, Schanzenfeld, was also named in his honour.

Shantz also founded a Mennonite colony at Didsbury, Alberta.

== See also ==
- List of mayors of Kitchener, Ontario
