= Morley Rosenberg =

Canadian politician (1937–2024)

Mayor of Kitchener
- In office 1977–1982
- Preceded by: Edith McIntosh
- Succeeded by: Dom Cardillo

Personal details
- Born: April 18, 1937 Montreal, Quebec, Canada
- Died: May 28, 2024 (aged 87) Toronto, Ontario, Canada
- Occupation: Lawyer

Morley A. Rosenberg QC (April 18, 1937 – May 28, 2024) was a Canadian lawyer and politician. He served as Mayor of Kitchener, Ontario from 1977 to 1982. Prior to that he served on Kitchener City Council as a city councillor for nine years, from 1968 to 1976, when he was also Chair of the Planning Committee for the City of Kitchener for that period. From 1973 to 1982 he also served as a Council Member of the Region of Waterloo. In 1983 he was appointed to the Ontario Municipal Board and served as a member for twenty years until 2002. Recently he was also a member of the Committee of Adjustment of the City of Toronto (North York) from 2011 to 2015.

Rosenberg attended the University of Western Ontario (1960) as well as Osgoode Hall Law School (1963), and was called to the bar in 1965. He remained undefeated during his 15 years on Kitchener City Council. He was very involved in historic preservation and environmental issues as a sitting member of the Grand River Conservation Authority and was one of the founders of the K-W Bilingual School.

Rosenberg died in Toronto on May 28, 2024, at the age of 87.
