= Waterloo (federal electoral district) =

Federal electoral district in Ontario, Canada

Ontario electoral district
- Interactive map of riding boundaries from the 2025 federal election
- Coordinates: 43.48°N 80.52°W

Federal electoral district
- Legislature: House of Commons
MP
Bardish Chagger
Liberal
- District created: 1966
- First contested: 1968
- Last contested: 2025
- District webpage: profile, map

Demographics
- Population (2021): 121,436
- Electors (2015): 77,312
- Area (km²): 68.4
- Pop. density (per km²): 1,775.4
- Census division: Waterloo
- Census subdivision: Waterloo

Waterloo is a federal electoral district in the Waterloo Region of Ontario, Canada, that has been used in the House of Commons of Canada from since 1968 (from 1973 to 1976, it was known as Waterloo—Cambridge). Between 1997 and 2015, the riding was known as Kitchener—Waterloo.

== Geography ==
As of 2025, the Waterloo electoral district contains all of the city of Waterloo.

== History ==
=== 1966–1973 ===
The Waterloo electoral district was created in 1966 from parts of Waterloo North and Waterloo South electoral districts. It initially comprised large sections of the Waterloo County (later Region) outside of the City of Kitchener, in particular in included, the City of Galt (now part of Cambridge), the City of Waterloo and the Townships of North Dumfries and Waterloo.

=== 1973–1976 ===
After the amalgamation of the City of Galt with the Towns of Preston and Hespeler into the City of Cambridge in 1973, the name of the electoral district was changed to Waterloo—Cambridge. The boundaries of the district were not changed to actually add the Preston and Hespeler asections of Cambridge into the riding.

=== 1976–1996 ===
In 1976, Waterloo—Cambridge was abolished when it was redistributed among Cambridge, Kitchener, and a new Waterloo electoral district.

The new Waterloo electoral district was created from parts of the Kitchener, Perth—Wilmot, Waterloo—Cambridge, and Wellington—Grey—Dufferin—Waterloo electoral districts. It comprised the Townships of Wellesley, Wilmot and Woolwich, the City of Waterloo, and parts of the City of Kitchener.

In 1987, the Waterloo electoral district was redefined to comprise the City of Waterloo, the northern part of the City of Kitchener, and the Township of Woolwich. The Townships of Wellesley and Wilmot were redistributed to the Perth—Wellington—Waterloo district.

The Waterloo electoral district was renamed to Kitchener—Waterloo and part of it was split into Waterloo—Wellington. The new district consisted initially of the City of Waterloo and the part of the City of Kitchener lying north of a line drawn from west to east along Highland Road West, Lawrence Avenue and Victoria Street.

=== 1997-2024 ===
In 2003, the Kitchener part of the riding was redefined to be the part of the city lying north of a line drawn from west to east along Highland Road West, Fischer Hallman Road and the Canadian National Railway situated north of Shadeland Crescent.

Following the 2011 census and a Canadian Parliament decision to increase the number of Federal electoral districts from 308 to 338, Elections Canada conducted a redistribution process that began with the establishment of Electoral Boundaries Commissions for each province in 2012. As a result of the work of the Electoral Boundaries Commission for the Province of Ontario, which was concluded in July 2013, a revived Waterloo was created out of 80% of the old Kitchener—Waterloo. The rest of the Kitchener-Waterloo riding was split between Kitchener Centre and Kitchener-Conestoga The revived riding comprised virtually all of the western portion of the old Kitchener—Waterloo, including all of Waterloo and a sliver of Kitchener lying north of the Canadian National Railway and northeast of Conestoga Parkway.

=== 2025-present ===
On September 22, 2023, the Federal Electoral Boundaries Commission for the Province of Ontario decided to remove the Kitchener portion of the riding and incorporate it into the Kitchener Centre riding, leaving the Waterloo riding to encompass only the city of Waterloo. This change will take effect upon the calling of the 2025 Canadian federal election.

=== Members of Parliament ===
This riding has elected the following members of the House of Commons of Canada:

Parliament	Years	Member	Party
Waterloo; Riding created from Waterloo North and Waterloo South
28th	1968–1972	Max Saltsman	New Democratic
29th	1972–1974	Max Saltsman	New Democratic
Waterloo—Cambridge
30th	1974–1979	Max Saltsman	New Democratic
Waterloo
31st	1979–1980	Walter McLean	Progressive Conservative
32nd	1980–1984	Walter McLean	Progressive Conservative
33rd	1984–1988	Walter McLean	Progressive Conservative
34th	1988–1993	Walter McLean	Progressive Conservative
35th	1993–1997	Andrew Telegdi	Liberal
Kitchener—Waterloo
36th	1997–2000	Andrew Telegdi	Liberal
37th	2000–2004	Andrew Telegdi	Liberal
38th	2004–2006	Andrew Telegdi	Liberal
39th	2006–2008	Andrew Telegdi	Liberal
40th	2008–2011	Peter Braid	Conservative
41st	2011–2015	Peter Braid	Conservative
Waterloo
42nd	2015–2019	Bardish Chagger	Liberal
43rd	2019–2021	Bardish Chagger	Liberal
44th	2021–2025	Bardish Chagger	Liberal
45th	2025–present	Bardish Chagger	Liberal

== Demographics ==
According to the 2021 Canadian census

Ethnic groups: 63.4% White, 10.5% South Asian, 9.1% Chinese, 3.0% Black, 2.6% Arab, 2.0% Indigenous, 1.9% Latin American, 1.7% West Asian, 1.4% Southeast Asian, 1.3% Korean, 1.0% Filipino

Languages: 64.9% English, 6.1% Mandarin, 2.1% Arabic, 1.5% German, 1.5% Spanish, 1.2% Hindi, 1.2% Punjabi, 1.1% Korean, 1.0% Urdu, 1.0% Persian

Religions: 46.0% Christian (18.2% Catholic, 3.3% United Church, 3.2% Lutheran, 2.7% Anglican, 2.4% Christian Orthodox, 1.7% Presbyterian, 1.3% Anabaptist, 1.1% Baptist, 1.0% Pentecostal, 11.1% Other), 7.9% Muslim, 4.6% Hindu, 1.2% Sikh, 1.1% Buddhist, 37.7% None

Median income: $41,600 (2020)

Average income: $60,600 (2020)

== Electoral history ==
Graph of election results in Waterloo (minor parties that never got 2% of the vote or didn't run consistently are omitted)

=== Waterloo, 2015–present ===
2025 Canadian federal election
** Preliminary results — Not yet official **
Party	Candidate	Votes	%	±%	Expenditures
Liberal	Bardish Chagger	37,580	59.49	+14.01	
Conservative	Waseem Botros	20,534	32.51	+5.07	
New Democratic	Héline Chow	2,620	4.15	–14.97	
Green	Simon Guthrie	1,602	2.54	–0.87	
People's	Douglas Ross	350	0.55	–4.00	
Independent	Val Neekman	180	0.28	N/A	
Rhinoceros	Santa Claus Chatham	119	0.19	N/A	
Independent	Hans Roach	104	0.16	N/A	
Independent	Jamie Hari	76	0.12	N/A	
Total valid votes/expense limit					
Total rejected ballots					
Turnout		63,165	72.39		
Eligible voters		87,261			
Liberal notional hold		Swing		+4.47	
Source: Elections Canada

2021 federal election redistributed results
Party	Vote	%
Liberal	25,816	45.48
Conservative	15,575	27.44
New Democratic	10,851	19.12
People's	2,583	4.55
Green	1,936	3.41

2021 Canadian federal election
Party	Candidate	Votes	%	±%	Expenditures
Liberal	Bardish Chagger	26,926	45.1	-3.7	$107,712.63
Conservative	Meghan Shannon	16,528	27.7	+3.2	$61,976.35
New Democratic	Jonathan Cassels	11,360	19.0	+3.8	$11,709.64
People's	Patrick Doucette	2,802	4.7	+3.0	$7,490.55
Green	Karla Villagomez Fajardo	2,038	3.4	-6.3	$4,629.92
Total valid votes/expense limit		59,654	99.4	–	$115.523.52
Total rejected ballots		353	0.6		
Turnout		60,007	69.4		
Eligible voters		86,456			
Liberal hold		Swing		-3.5	
Source: Elections Canada

2019 Canadian federal election
Party	Candidate	Votes	%	±%	Expenditures
Liberal	Bardish Chagger	31,085	48.8	-0.9	$107,088.00
Conservative	Jerry Zhang	15,615	24.5	-7.8	$84,796.68
New Democratic	Lori Campbell	9,710	15.2	+0.3	none listed
Green	Kirsten Wright	6,184	9.7	+6.8	none listed
People's	Erika Traub	1,112	1.7	–	$5,385.50
Total valid votes/expense limit		63,706	100.0	–	112,180.38
Total rejected ballots		417	0.65	+0.33	
Turnout		64,123	74.76	-2.9	
Eligible voters		85,761			
Liberal hold		Swing		+3.45	
Source: Elections Canada, Global News

2015 Canadian federal election
Party	Candidate	Votes	%	±%	Expenditures
Liberal	Bardish Chagger	29,752	49.7	+11.38	$140,131.74
Conservative	Peter Braid	19,318	32.3	-9.08	$148,370.13
New Democratic	Diane Freeman	8,928	14.9	-0.04	$96,964.67
Green	Richard Walsh	1,713	2.9	-1.78	–
Animal Alliance	Emma Hawley-Yan	138	0.2	–	$4,066.17
Total valid votes/Expense limit		59,849	100.0	–	$212,120.63
Total rejected ballots		198	0.32	–	
Turnout		60,047	77.66	–	
Eligible voters		77,312			
Source: Elections Canada

2011 federal election redistributed results
Party	Vote	%
Conservative	22,193	41.38
Liberal	20,551	38.32
New Democratic	8,014	14.94
Green	2,508	4.68
Others	366	0.68

=== Kitchener—Waterloo, 1997-2011 ===
2011 Canadian federal election: Kitchener—Waterloo
Party	Candidate	Votes	%	±%	Expenditures
Conservative	Peter Braid	27,039	40.85	+4.79	$90,641.15
Liberal	Andrew Telegdi	24,895	37.62	+1.59	–
New Democratic	Bill Brown	10,606	16.03	+1.31	$21,334.44
Green	Cathy MacLellan	3,158	4.77	-7.33	–
Pirate	Steven Bradley Scott	245	0.37	–	–
Independent	Richard Walsh-Bowers	174	0.26	–	–
Marxist–Leninist	Julian Ichim	66	0.10	–	none listed
Total valid votes		66,183	100.00	–	
Total rejected ballots		216	0.33	-0.05	
Turnout		66,399	70.17	+7.86	
Eligible voters		94,624	–	–	

2008 Canadian federal election: Kitchener—Waterloo
Party	Candidate	Votes	%	±%	Expenditures
Conservative	Peter Braid	21,830	36.06	+7.75	$93,455
Liberal	Andrew Telegdi	21,813	36.03	-10.82	$71,443
New Democratic	Cindy Jacobsen	8,915	14.72	-3.16	$34,713
Green	Cathy MacLellan	7,326	12.10	+5.64	$19,781
Libertarian	Jason Cousineau	333	0.55	–	$0
Independent	Mark Corbiere	107	0.17	–	
Communist	Ramon Portillo	105	0.17	–	$373
Canadian Action	Kyle Huntingdon	105	0.17	–	$203
Total valid votes/expense limit		60,534	100.00	$95,412	
Total rejected ballots		229	0.38	–	
Turnout		60,763	62.31	-8.08	

2006 Canadian federal election
Party	Candidate	Votes	%	±%
Liberal	Andrew Telegdi	31,136	46.85	-1.2
Conservative	Ajmer Mandur	18,817	28.31	-1.1
New Democratic	Edwin Laryea	11,889	17.88	+1.9
Green	Pauline Richards	4,298	6.46	+0.9
Independent	Ciprian Mihalcea	173	0.26	-0.4
Marxist–Leninist	Julian Ichim	144	0.21	
Total valid votes		66,457	100.0	
Total rejected ballots		240	0.38	
Turnout		66,697	70.39	

2004 Canadian federal election
Party	Candidate	Votes	%	±%
Liberal	Andrew Telegdi	28,015	48.1	-2.2
Conservative	Steve Strauss	17,155	29.5	-9.5
New Democratic	Edwin Laryea	9,267	15.9	+7.8
Green	Pauline Richards	3,277	5.6	+4.1
Christian Heritage	Frank Ellis	379	0.7	
Independent	Ciprian Mihalcea	124	0.2	
Total valid votes		58,217	100.0	

Note: Conservative vote is compared to the total of the Canadian Alliance vote and Progressive Conservative vote in 2000 election.

2000 Canadian federal election
Party	Candidate	Votes	%	±%
Liberal	Andrew Telegdi	27,130	50.3	+2.6
Alliance	Joshua Doig	12,406	23.0	+3.1
Progressive Conservative	Brian Bourke	8,601	16.0	-6.1
New Democratic	Richard Walsh-Bowers	4,397	8.2	-0.8
Green	Jack MacAulay	809	1.5	
Canadian Action	Robert E. Cormier	273	0.5	0.0
Marxist–Leninist	Christine Nugent	164	0.3	0.0
Independent	Frank Ellis	105	0.2	
Total valid votes		53,885	100.0	

1997 Canadian federal election
Party	Candidate	Votes	%
Liberal	Andrew Telegdi	25,111	47.7
Progressive Conservative	Lynne Woolstencroft	11,613	22.1
Reform	Mike Connolly	10,502	20.0
New Democratic	Ted Martin	4,725	9.0
Independent	Steve King	265	0.5
Canadian Action	Monte Dennis	260	0.5
Marxist–Leninist	Helmut Braun	153	0.3
Total valid votes		52,629	100.0

=== Waterloo, 1976–1996 ===
1993 Canadian federal election
Party	Candidate	Votes	%	±%
Liberal	Andrew Telegdi	25,689	42.06	+5.71
Reform	Mike Connolly	15,549	25.46	
Progressive Conservative	Lynne Woolstencroft	14,882	24.37	–20.74
New Democratic	Scott Piatkowski	2,779	4.55	–12.89
Christian Heritage	Ted Kryn	920	1.51	
Libertarian	Rita Huschka-Sprague	473	0.77	–0.34
Natural Law	Blaine P. Watson	456	0.75	
Independent	Don Philip Faithful	329	0.54	
Total valid votes		61,077	100.00	
Liberal gain from Progressive Conservative		Swing		–9.88

1988 Canadian federal election
Party	Candidate	Votes	%	±%
Progressive Conservative	Walter McLean	26,949	45.11	–11.24
Liberal	Steve Woodworth	21,715	36.35	+11.78
New Democratic	Scott Piatkowski	10,418	17.44	–0.71
Libertarian	Rita Huschka-Sprague	663	1.11	+0.18
Total valid votes		59,745	100.0	
Progressive Conservative hold		Swing		–11.51

1984 Canadian federal election
Party	Candidate	Votes	%	±%
Progressive Conservative	Walter McLean	31,898	56.35	+16.36
Liberal	Lynn Myers	13,911	24.57	–15.13
New Democratic	Bob Needham	10,275	18.15	–0.91
Libertarian	Layne E. Kulchecki	525	0.93	+0.49
Total valid votes		56,609	100.0	
Progressive Conservative hold		Swing		+15.74

1980 Canadian federal election
Party	Candidate	Votes	%	±%
Progressive Conservative	Walter McLean	20,609	39.99	–6.07
Liberal	Frank Epp	20,455	39.70	+4.59
New Democratic	Bob Needham	9,819	19.06	+0.94
Rhinoceros	Rick Nigol	330	0.64	
Libertarian	Colin McLorg	229	0.44	–0.03
Marxist–Leninist	Brian Erdman	87	0.17	–0.07
Total valid votes		51,529	100.0	
Progressive Conservative hold		Swing		–5.33

1979 Canadian federal election
Party	Candidate	Votes	%	±%
Progressive Conservative	Walter McLean	23,837	46.06	+17.68
Liberal	Frank Epp	18,172	35.11	+5.68
New Democratic	Mike Makarchuk	9,375	18.12	–23.46
Libertarian	Bonne Willy Posma	241	0.47	
Marxist–Leninist	Brian Erdman	125	0.24	+0.04
Total valid votes		51,750	100.0	
Progressive Conservative gain from New Democratic		Swing		+6.00

=== Waterloo—Cambridge, 1973–1976 ===
1974 Canadian federal election
Party	Candidate	Votes	%	±%
New Democratic	Max Saltsman	25,479	41.58	+1.10
Liberal	Brian Goff	18,034	29.43	+3.39
Progressive Conservative	Glenn Carroll	17,394	28.38	–4.77
Social Credit	John H. Long	253	0.41	+0.17
Marxist–Leninist	Richard E. Rathwell	122	0.20	
Total valid votes		61,282	100.0	
New Democratic hold		Swing		–1.14

=== Waterloo, 1966–1973 ===
1972 Canadian federal election
Party	Candidate	Votes	%	±%
New Democratic	Max Saltsman	24,197	40.48	+6.48
Progressive Conservative	Glenn E. Carroll	19,817	33.15	+0.63
Liberal	Lou Breithaupt	15,570	26.04	–7.07
Social Credit	Régent G. Gervais	143	0.24	–0.13
No affiliation	Jules W.P. Grajower	55	0.09	
Total valid votes		59,782	100.0	
New Democratic hold		Swing		+2.92

1968 Canadian federal election
Party	Candidate	Votes	%
New Democratic	Max Saltsman	15,231	34.00
Liberal	Herbert Epp	14,835	33.11
Progressive Conservative	Liam S. O'Brian	14,568	32.52
Social Credit	Régent Gervais	167	0.37
Total valid votes		44,801	100.0
This riding was created from parts of Waterloo North and Waterloo South, which elected a Liberal and a Progressive Conservative, respectively, in the last election.

== See also ==
- List of Canadian electoral districts
- Historical federal electoral districts of Canada
