= Alexander Black Robertson =

Canadian politician (1847–1920)

Alexander Black Robertson (1847–1920) was a Canadian farmer and Ontario political figure. He represented Waterloo North in the Legislative Assembly of Ontario as a Liberal member from 1894 to 1898.

He was born 7 July 1847 in Wellesley Township, Waterloo County, Canada West. His parents were Scottish immigrants.
