= Walter McLean =

Canadian politician

The Honourable Walter McLean PC

Member of Parliament for Waterloo
- In office 1979–1993
- Preceded by: Max Saltsman
- Succeeded by: Andrew Telegdi

Personal details
- Born: April 26, 1936 (age 90) Leamington, Ontario
- Party: Progressive Conservative
- Spouse: Barbara
- Profession: Church minister

Walter Franklin McLean, PC (born April 26, 1936) is a former Canadian politician.

Born in Leamington, Ontario, he grew up in Victoria British Columbia, the son of James Walter Lewis McLean (1905–1998), a Presbyterian minister, and Frances D. Blair McLean. He studied at the University of British Columbia and Toronto's Knox College. Walter and his wife Barbara were designated as Presbyterian missionaries; Walter was the first CUSO coordinator in Nigeria in 1962.

Following the civil war in Nigeria, the McLeans returned to Canada, and settled in Winnipeg, Manitoba, where Walter was involved in that province's 1970 Centennial Celebrations.

In 1971, the family moved to Waterloo, Ontario, and Walter became the Minister of Knox Church, and involved in local affairs. He was elected to the House of Commons of Canada as a Progressive Conservative candidate in the 1979 federal election in the riding of Waterloo. He was re-elected in the 1980, 1984 and 1988 elections. He retired from politics in 1993.

From 1984 to 1985, he was Secretary of State for Canada, and from 1985 to 1986, he was Minister of State (Immigration).

He has represented Canada as the Parliamentary Delegate to the United Nations General Assembly, and as Special Representative for African and Commonwealth Affairs.

Within the Presbytrerian Church in Canada, he is now a "Minister in Association" with Knox Waterloo. He was co-ordinator of the "Celebrate 125" festivities in 1999–2000. He was rewarded with a Doctor of Divinity degree from Knox College in 2002. His wife Barbara has also served in the Church as Presbytery Clerk in the Waterloo-Wellington Presbytery, and in the national Church as Deputy Clerk of the Presbyterian Church in Canada's General Assembly from 1992 to 2003.

== Archives ==
There is a Walter McLean fonds at Library and Archives Canada.
