= Dom Cardillo =

Mayor of Kitchener, Ontario
- In office 1982–1994
- Preceded by: Morley Rosenberg
- Succeeded by: Richard Christy

Personal details
- Born: October 26, 1930 Guelph, Ontario
- Died: April 14, 2013 (aged 82) Kitchener, Ontario

Dominic Cardillo (October 26, 1930 – April 14, 2013) was a Canadian politician, who served as mayor of Kitchener, Ontario from 1982 to 1994.

Born and raised in Guelph, Cardillo was educated at the University of Guelph and moved to Kitchener in 1954 to work as a teacher. He first ran for Kitchener City Council as an alderman in 1963, and served in that role for 20 years prior to his election as mayor.

His term as mayor was marked by significant economic growth, a record of balanced budgets, and the construction of the modern Kitchener City Hall.

He retired in 1994, and was succeeded as mayor by Richard Christy. He is the second longest-serving mayor in the city's history, after Carl Zehr.

He died in 2013 from Parkinson's disease.
