= Lynne Woolstencroft =

Canadian politician

Mayor of Waterloo, Ontario
- In office 2000–2003
- Preceded by: Joan McKinnon
- Succeeded by: Herb Epp

Personal details
- Born: September 23, 1943 Saskatoon, Saskatchewan, Canada
- Died: May 13, 2013 (aged 69) Cambridge, Ontario, Canada
- Party: Progressive Conservative Party of Ontario
- Education: University of Calgary; Central Michigan University
- Occupation: municipal politician, school board trustee
- Profession: community college instructor

Lynne Elizabeth Woolstencroft (September 23, 1943 – May 13, 2013) was a Canadian politician and former mayor of Waterloo, Ontario.

== Life and career ==
Woolstencroft was born in Saskatoon, Saskatchewan. She held a Bachelor of Education degree from the University of Calgary and a Master of Arts from Central Michigan University.

She was married to Peter Woolstencroft, a university administrator and professor of political science at the University of Waterloo. She taught a wide range of classes, from advanced Shakespeare classes in high schools to basic literacy and life skills courses for adult learners. In addition to a long-term teaching career at Conestoga College in Waterloo Region, she taught courses on environment issues and problem-solving at the University of Waterloo.

She received many awards for her political and community service, most notably the Queen Elizabeth II Diamond Jubilee Medal and the Jack Young Civic Award, Waterloo Region's highest recognition for civic service. Her commitment to enhancing the quality of the environment in Waterloo resulted in the city being cited as the Greenest city in Ontario by TVO. The Grand River Conservation Authority awarded her a posthumous award in the fall of 2013 to honour her environmental leadership in her forty years of community work and public service.

== Political career ==
In the 1985 Ontario election, she was a candidate for the Progressive Conservative Party of Ontario in Waterloo North, and was defeated. She also stood as the candidate for the Progressive Conservative Party of Canada in the 1993 federal election in the riding of Waterloo, and in the 1997 federal election in the riding of Kitchener—Waterloo; she was defeated both times.

Woolstencroft served as a trustee on Waterloo County Board of Education (1970–1972, 1974–1985), including being elected chair from 1979 to 1982. She also served as President of the Association of Large School Boards in Ontario in 1984 and 1985.

Woolstencroft served as a councillor for the City of Waterloo for three terms, from 1985–1988, 1988–1991, and 1997–2000. In 2000 she was elected as Mayor of Waterloo, Ontario.

Her tenure as mayor was dominated by the RIM Park scandal, involving the financing of RIM Park with a loan from MFP Financial Services of Mississauga, a deal which had occurred before her time as mayor but which she had supported as a councillor. This ultimately led to a full judicial inquiry of the RIM Park deal, at which Woolstencroft testified and argued she had merely been a "peripheral councillor on this".

During her time as mayor, the city of Waterloo entered into agreements that resulted in the establishment of the Perimeter Institute, the Centre for International Governance Innovation, and the Research and Technology Park at the University of Waterloo.

In the municipal election of November 2003, Woolstencroft was defeated by former mayor and MPP Herb Epp.

== Death ==
Woolstencroft died May 13, 2013, at the age of 69.

== See also ==
- List of University of Waterloo people
