= Jacob Staebler =

Canadian insurance broker and politician

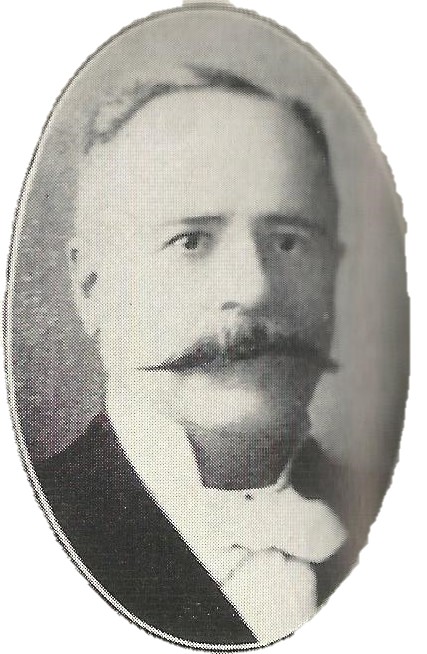
J. M. Staebler

Jacob Merner Staebler (August 16, 1846 – May 7, 1906) was an insurance broker and politician in Ontario, Canada. He served as mayor of Berlin in 1891.

He was born in Wilmot Township, Waterloo County, Canada West. His father, Jacob Friederich Staebler, was born in Bernhausen, Esslingen in what is now the German state of Baden-Württemberg. His mother, Ann or Anna Muerner (or Merner), was from Switzerland.

He was elected to the Berlin town council in 1880. Staebler also served as president of the local Board of Trade. He died on May 7, 1906, and was buried at Mount Hope Cemetery in Kitchener.

His former home, built in the late 1870s, was purchased by John Metz Schneider during the early 1900s.
