= Conrad Bitzer =

Canadian lawyer and politician

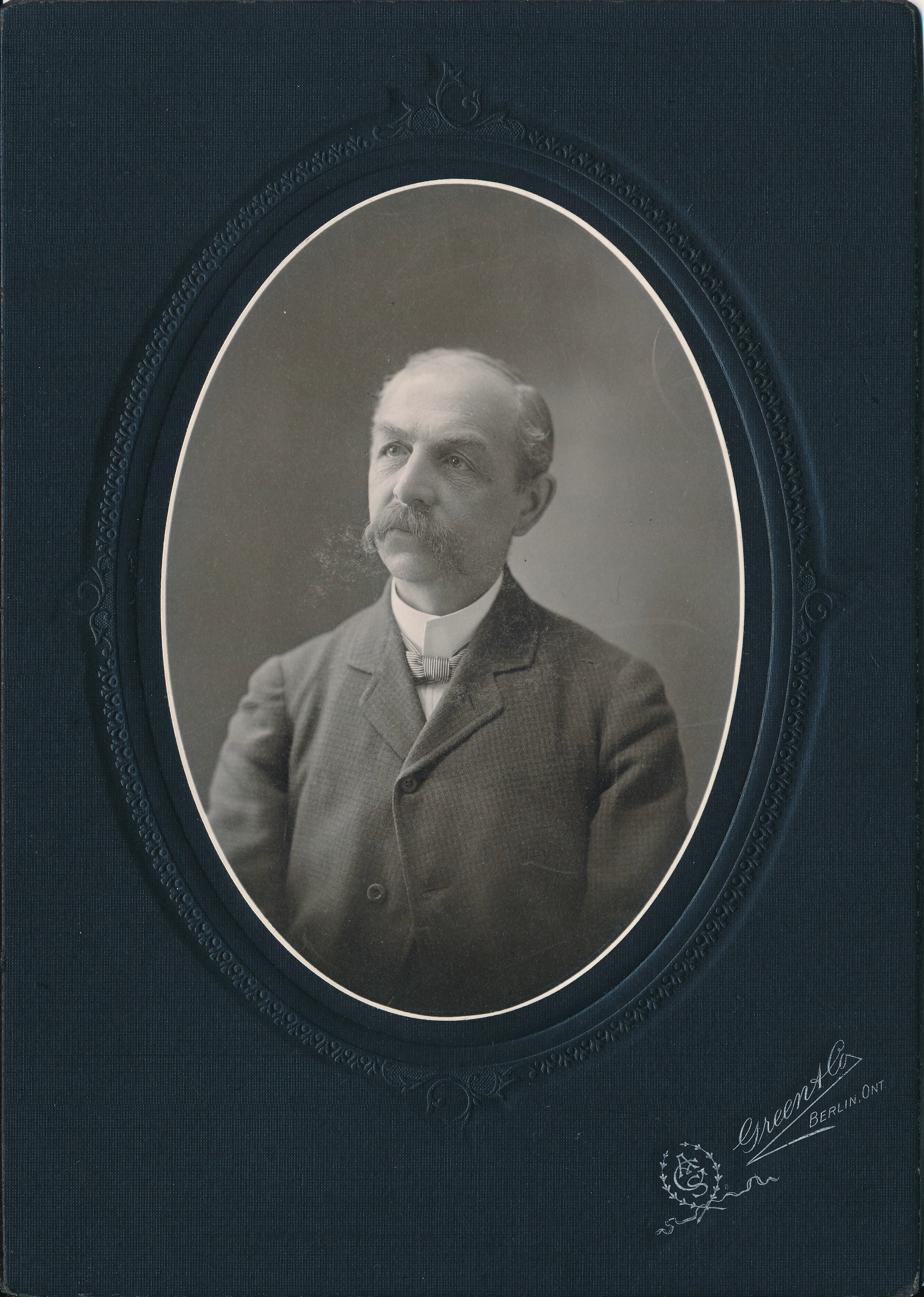
Image of noted Berlin, Ontario citizen Conrad Bitzer.

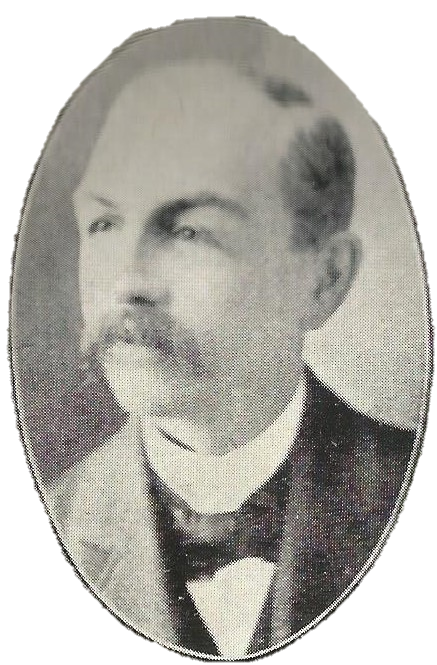
Conrad Bitzer

Conrad Bitzer (January 11, 1853 – September 22, 1903) was a lawyer and politician in Ontario, Canada. He served as mayor of Berlin in 1892.

Bitzer was born on January 11, 1853, in Preston, Canada West. His father, Gottlieb Bitzer, was born in Württemberg and his mother, Dorothea Schaak, was from Hesse. Gottlieb Bitzer constructed the Lancaster Hotel in 1840 in the nearby village of Bridgeport.

He was called to the Ontario bar in 1881 and set up practice in Berlin, the first German-speaking lawyer to practice in the area. He was a member of the local Board of Trade. Bitzer was nominated as the Liberal candidate for the Waterloo North seat in the Canadian House of Commons for the 1900 general election but withdrew before the election date.

He died on September 22, 1903, and was buried at Mount Hope Cemetery in Kitchener.
