= John Henry Cook =

Canadian politician

John Henry Cook (May 6, 1902 – May 2, 1980) was a barber and politician in Ontario, Canada. He represented Waterloo North in the Legislative Assembly of Ontario from 1943 to 1945 as a Co-operative Commonwealth Federation (CCF) member.

The son of Henry Saunder Koch and Lavina Bergey, he was born John Henry Koch in Woolwich township and was educated there, in St. Jacobs, in Kitchener, in Toronto and in Newburgh, New York. In 1935, Cook married Emma M. Debus. He was secretary-treasurer of the Barbers International Union and president of the Twin Cities Trade and Labor Council. Cook was also a member of the Knights of Pythias. He served on Kitchener city council from 1946 to 1956 and from 1958 to 1965.

Cook, a Mennonite, was of Pennsylvania Dutch descent. He died following a heart attack at the Kitchener-Waterloo Hospital at the age of 77.
