= William Jaffray (politician) =

Canadian politician (1832–1896)

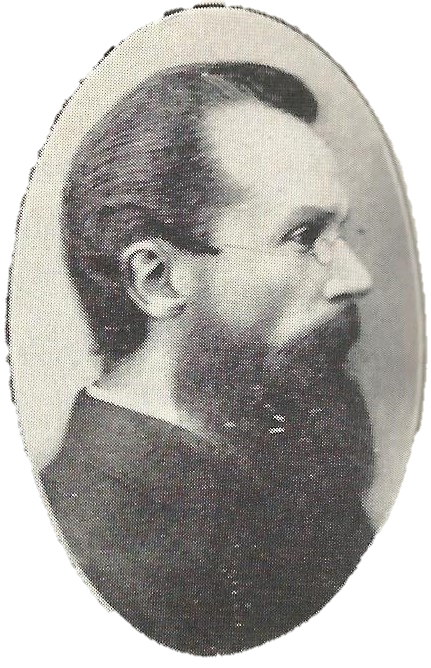
- Jaffray
- Born: 6 March 1832; Shrewsbury, Shropshire, England
- Died: 29 September 1896 (aged 64); Berlin, Ontario, Canada
- Burial place: Mount Hope Cemetery, Waterloo, Ontario, Canada
- Occupations: Newspaper editor; Postmaster
- Known for: Editor of the Berlin Chronicle; postmaster and mayor of Berlin, Ontario
- Spouse: Agnes Smith Jackson (m. 1854)
- Children: 8
- Parents: Peter Jaffray (father); Mary Ann Gittins (mother)

Village Councillor of Berlin, Ontario
- In office 1866–1867

Deputy Reeve of Berlin, Ontario
- In office 1870

Town Councillor of Berlin, Ontario
- In office 1871

Town Councillor of Berlin, Ontario
- In office 1880–1881

Mayor of Berlin, Ontario
- In office 1882–1883
- Preceded by: Jacob Yost Shantz
- Succeeded by: Alex Millar

William Jaffray (6 March 1832 – 29 September 1896) was an English-born publisher and politician in Waterloo County, Ontario, Canada. He served as the mayor of Berlin, Ontario (which is now known as Kitchener) from 1882 to 1883.

== Biography ==
William Jaffray was born on 6 March 1832 in Shrewsbury, Shropshire, England. His father, Peter Jaffray, was born in 1800 in Stirlingshire, Scotland. Peter was educated at the University of Glasgow and became involved in the publishing industry through working for the Edinburgh printing and publishing firm of Oliver and Boyd. After moving to Shrewsbury, Peter then worked for the Shrewsbury Chronicle for twenty-two years, later starting the Shrewsbury News. He married Mary Ann Gittins, who had been born in Shrewsbury, and together they had eight children, most of them also born in Shrewsbury. William was the second child and also their eldest son. In his youth, he attended the Diocesan School in Shrewsbury for one year.

In 1844, Peter Jaffray immigrated to the Goderich area of Canada West, hoping to become a gentleman farmer. On his way, he passed through the town of Galt in Dumfries Township. After arriving to his destination, however, he quickly came to dislike the pioneer lifestyle, and began to search for alternatives. He considered joining the fledgling Toronto Globe, which under its founder and editor, George Brown, was a leading voice for the Reform movement in Upper Canada, which advocated for liberal political reforms in the wake of the Upper Canada Rebellion of 1837. Instead, he opted to join the newly-founded Dumfries Courier, which was published out of Galt for distribution in Dumfries Township. The township had been originally settled in 1816 under the direction of William Dickson, who named it after his hometown, the burgh of Dumfries in Scotland, and drew the first wave of settlers primarily from Roxburghshire and Selkirkshire in Scotland. The Dumfries Courier began publication in the summer of 1844 and shared its name with another contemporary newspaper which was published in Annan, Dumfriesshire, Scotland.

The Courier's founder and editor, Ben Hearle, was described in one account as "easy-going, genial but shiftless," and relied heavily on the Jaffray family for the publication of his newspaper. After working for Hearle for two years, Jaffray and his sons gave him notice that they were leaving the newspaper. Hearle realized that the Courier was doomed, and offered to sell his antiquated equipment to Jaffray, which Jaffray refused. Instead, in 1846, Jaffray and his sons (including William) began publishing their own newspaper, the Galt Reporter. The Reporter was initially published out of a building to the rear of Main Street in Galt, with its first issue being published on 13 November 1846. In January of the next year, the Reporter relocated to a building at the corner of Main Street and Ainslie Street, which was owned by James Ainslie, with whom Jaffray formed a partnership. The partnership continued for the next two years, but Ainslie and Jaffray had a falling out over the political content of the newspaper; Ainslie, a supporter of the Reform movement, left to found a rival newspaper, the Dumfries Reformer. In 1853, Ainslie sold the Reformer to James Young, a local politician and newspaperman who later joined George Brown's Liberal Party and represented Waterloo South as a member of the 1st Canadian Parliament in 1867. With Ainslie's departure, the Reporter took on a significantly more conservative tone. Peter began involving his sons more extensively in the newspaper, with William joining his father as a full partner in 1851. Around this time, William served in the sedentary militia, reaching the rank of lieutenant in 1854.

On 26 January 1854, Jaffray married his wife, Agnes Smith Jackson, with whom he would ultimately have eight children. She had been born in Kilmarnock, Ayrshire, Scotland, on 5 May 1833. Her father, James Jackson, a clothier, had emigrated with his family from Scotland, first arriving in New York City on 29 May 1835, only shortly after Agnes' first birthday. The family immigrated to Canada in 1838, arriving in North Dumfries shortly before the death of her mother, Mary Ann Browning, in October 1838. William and Agnes' eldest son, James Peter Jaffray, was born on 11 November 1854, with two more sons following in 1856, and another in 1857.

In 1856, the Grand Trunk Railway reached Berlin in its westward push from Toronto. Waterloo County had been formed several years earlier, in 1853, with Berlin as the county seat. This was a coup for the landowners and town boosters of Berlin, which was a rival centre with Galt and which sat near the geographic centre of the historic Waterloo Township. Dumfries Township had already been divided into North Dumfries and South Dumfries, and now these were further divided from each other, with North Dumfries (including Galt, which separated from the township in 1857) becoming a part of Waterloo County, putting it under the jurisdiction of a county governed from Berlin. Berlin grew explosively as merchants and manufacturers were attracted to the presence of the railway, and the Grand Trunk Railway station became the place where many immigrants first arrived in the area.

As the Grand Trunk Railway arrived, so did William Jaffray, who moved his family to Berlin in the same year of 1856 and set up a newspaper called the Berlin Chronicle, which was one of Berlin's first English-language newspapers. It was a contemporary of a number of German-language newspapers such as Der Deutsche Canadier. Jaffray, however, soon exited the newspaper business to pursue government positions and sold off the Chronicle in 1861. He was appointed to be the postmaster of Berlin on 1 April 1862, a position he held until his death in 1896. He also became the express and telegraph agent in 1864.

His brother Richard served as mayor of Galt.

He is buried at Mount Hope Cemetery, which straddles the border between the modern-day cities of Kitchener and Waterloo.
