= William Stevenson Jaffray =

British military chaplain

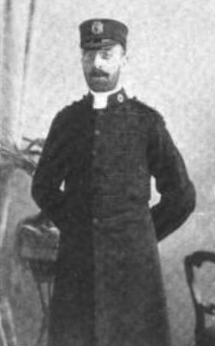
- In The Sketch, 20 June 1900
- Born: 30 March 1867; Aberdeenshire, Scotland
- Died: 6 November 1941 (aged 74); Torphins, Scotland
- Education: University of Edinburgh
- Occupation: Military chaplain
- Spouse: Ethel Annie Duncan Law (m. 1901)

William Stevenson Jaffray (30 March 1867 – 6 November 1941) was one of the most highly decorated and high ranking military chaplains in the British Army. He was also Chaplain to King George V.

== Life ==
He was born on 30 March 1867 the son of Col William Stevenson Jaffray of Greystones House in Aberdeenshire, and his wife Ann Callins, daughter of Canon Callins.

He studied Divinity at the University of Edinburgh and was licensed to preach by the Presbytery of the Church of Scotland of Stirling in 1891.

In January 1897 he was appointed chaplain to the British Army. He received military training at Shorncliffe, Aldershot and Salisbury Plain. He then began an extraordinary military career, accompanying troops in South Africa, Egypt, Malta, France, Salonika and on the Black Sea.

In the Second Boer War he saw action on at least seven occasions. He was Mentioned in Dispatches and received the Queen's South Africa Medal with six clasps.

He was promoted to Principal Chaplain for England and Ireland (in the field) and also Deputy Chaplain to the War Office (in London). His duties in the field included overseeing multiple mass burials after major battles and also comforting countless of the dying.

In the First World War he went to France with the British Expeditionary Force and was Principal Chaplain to the 7th Division and Assistant Head Chaplain to the 5th Army. He was then promoted to Principal Chaplain to the army at the rank of Brigadier General.

He was awarded an honorary doctorate (DD) by Edinburgh University in 1921. In May of the same year he was made Chaplain to the King.

He retired from the army in 1925 and lived in London from 1928.

In January 1932, Jaffray was appointed Chaplain Commandant of the Royal Army Chaplains' Department. He left this post in March 1937, having reached the age limit of 70.

He died in Torphins on 6 November 1941.

== Awards ==
- Mentioned In Dispatches at least twelve times
- Queen's South Africa Medal with six clasps
- Commander of the Order of St Michael and St George (CMG) 1915
- Commander of the Order of the British Empire (CBE-military) 1919
- Knight Commander of the Order of St Sava awarded by the King of Serbia
- 1914 Star with clasp
- British War Medal
- Victory Medal 1919

== Family ==
In 1901 he married Ethel Annie Duncan Law, daughter of Major James Law RE of Aberdeenshire.
