= Max Saltsman =

Canadian politician and businessman (1921–1985)

- Official 1974 portrait

Member of Parliament for Waterloo South (Waterloo; 1968–1974) (Waterloo—Cambridge; 1974–1979)
- In office 9 November 1964 – 21 May 1979
- Preceded by: Gordon Chaplin
- Succeeded by: Riding abolished

Personal details
- Born: Samuel Mayer Saltsman; 29 May 1921 Toronto, Ontario, Canada
- Died: 28 November 1985 (aged 64) Toronto, Ontario, Canada
- Party: New Democratic Party
- Spouse: Dorothy Gellman (m. 1947)
- Profession: Businessman; politician

Military service
- Allegiance: Canada
- Branch/service: Royal Canadian Air Force
- Years of service: 1940–1945
- Rank: Corporal
- Battles/wars: World War II

Samuel Mayer "Max" Saltsman (29 May 1921 – 28 November 1985) was a Canadian businessman and politician who served as a Member of Parliament (MP) for Waterloo South (1964–1968), Waterloo (1968–1974), and Waterloo—Cambridge (1974–1979) with the New Democratic Party (NDP).

== Early life and education ==
Saltsman was born on 29 May 1921 in Toronto to Samuel and Sara (née Krier) Saltsman, gaining the nickname “Max” in childhood. He attended schools in the Spadina area and left Central Technical School at age 14 to work and support his family. He earned high-school credits through part-time studies after work.

Saltsman did not complete a university degree, but took correspondence courses while serving in the Royal Canadian Air Force (RCAF) and continued his education sporadically during his years in Parliament. During World War II, he served in France, the Netherlands, and Germany with the RCAF. In 1947, he married Dorothy Gellman. He was president of Galt Dry Cleaning Services and Eastern Coin Operated Enterprise.

== Career in politics ==
Saltsman was first elected to the House of Commons in a 1964 by‑election following the death of MP Gordon Chaplin, and was re‑elected in the general elections of 1965, 1968, 1972, and 1974. He served as the New Democratic Party critic for Finance and National Revenue in 1976–1977. He drafted private member's bill C‑249, “An Act Respecting a Proposed Association Between Canada and the Caribbean Turks and Caicos Islands,” proposing an association between Canada and the islands; the bill did not proceed to a vote.

Before entering federal office, Saltsman was an alderman in Galt, Ontario, from 1961 to 1964. In 1982, Bill Davis, the Premier of Ontario, appointed Saltsman to the province's Inflation Restraint Board. He planned to return to municipal politics as a councillor‑at‑large for Cambridge in 1985, but withdrew at a news conference on 21 October after announcing a diagnosis of terminal liver cancer.

Saltsman died at Toronto's Wellesley Hospital on 28 November 1985, two weeks after the Cambridge municipal election. The Max Saltsman fonds are held at Library and Archives Canada.

== Electoral record ==
1965 Canadian federal election: Waterloo South
Party	Candidate	Votes	%	±%
New Democratic	Max Saltsman	13,337	46.15	+1.90
Progressive Conservative	Jim Chaplin	9,678	33.49	-2.43
Liberal	Reid Menary	5,886	20.37	+0.54
Total valid votes		28,901	100.0	
New Democratic hold		Swing		+2.17
Source(s) "Waterloo South, Ontario (1867-1968)". History of Federal Ridings Since 1867. Library of Parliament.

Canadian federal by-election, November 9, 1964: Waterloo South Death of Gordon Chaplin
Party	Candidate	Votes	%	±%
New Democratic	Max Saltsman	12,417	44.25	+17.85
Progressive Conservative	Jim Chaplin	10,078	35.92	-5.01
Liberal	Rod Stewart	5,563	19.83	-11.52
Total valid votes		28,058	100.0	
New Democratic gain from Progressive Conservative		Swing		+11.43
Source(s) "Waterloo South, Ontario (1867-1968)". History of Federal Ridings Since 1867. Library of Parliament.
