= Henry Sturm =

Henry William Sturm (1884–1977) was a barber and politician in Ontario, Canada. He served as mayor of Kitchener from 1933 to 1934.

He was born in Waterloo and was educated locally. He apprenticed as a barber and worked at J.J. MacCallum's News and Barber Shop until 1918. Sturm served on Kitchener council from 1924 to 1926, in 1928, from 1930 to 1932, from 1936 to 1942 and from 1944 to 1953.

He helped promote the construction of the Kitchener Memorial Auditorium and served on the Kitchener Memorial Auditorium Commission.

The Victoria Park neighbourhood of Kitchener holds a Henry Sturm Festival each year. Henry Sturm Boulevard in Kitchener was also named in his honour.
