= William Pope Clement =

Canadian politician

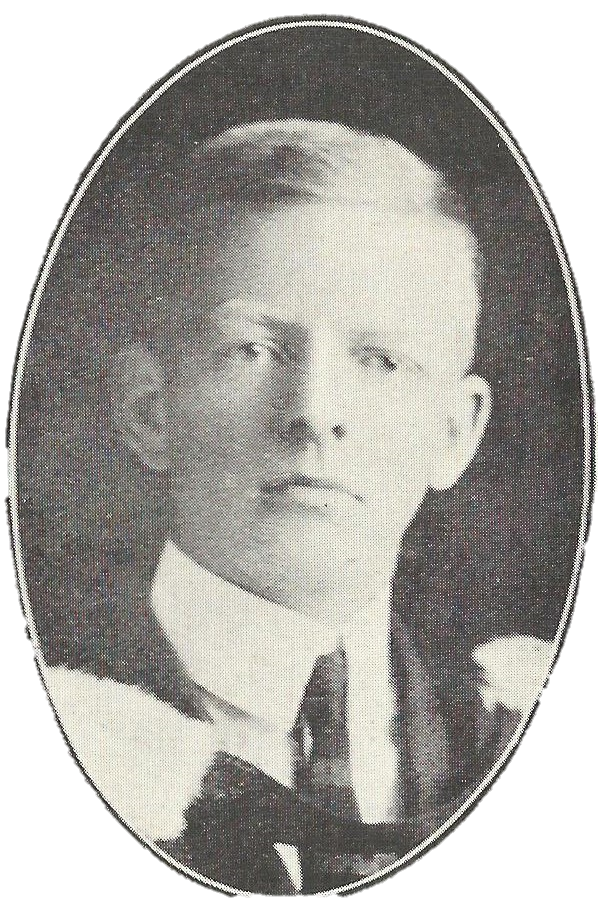
W. P. Clement

William Pope Clement, QC (August 26, 1887 – 1982) was a politician in Ontario, Canada. He served as mayor of Kitchener from 1929 to 1930.

The son of Edwin Perry Clement and Janie Elizabeth Bowlby, Clement was born in Berlin (later Kitchener) on August 26, 1887. He was educated there and at the University of Toronto. In 1912, he entered the practice of law in the family firm of Bowlby, Colquhoun and Clement. In 1936, Clement was named King's Counsel. He later served as Crown attorney for Waterloo County.

In 1915, he married Muriel Alberta Kerr.

Clement played organ for three different churches in Kitchener, sang with the Kitchener-Waterloo Philharmonic Choir and played viola for 25 years with the Kitchener Waterloo Symphony Orchestra.

Clement died on May 21, 1982, at the age of 94. He was buried at Mount Hope Cemetery along with his wife and daughter Elizabeth who preceded him in death.
