= Joseph Ignatino Meinzinger =

Canadian politician (1892-1962)

Joseph Ignatino Meinzinger (February 18, 1892 – June 3, 1962) was an Ontario insurance salesman and political figure. He represented Waterloo North in the Legislative Assembly of Ontario from 1945 to 1948 as a Liberal-Labour member.

He was born in Berlin, Ontario (later Kitchener), the son of Ignatius Meinzinger. In 1918, he married Lillian Hummel. Meinzinger owned a boxing club in the city and served six years as mayor of Kitchener. He was a member of the Knights of Columbus.

He was a member of the 118th (North Waterloo) Battalion, CEF during the Berlin-to-Kitchener name change. Police Constable Jim Blevins appeared at the barracks to serve a summons to Private Meinzinger for his assault on another citizen. Meinzinger punched Blevins, and rumours circulated that the policeman was not expected to live on account of a broken jaw bone. Blevins did survive; Meinzinger was charged and sentenced to 18 months in jail.

He died on June 3, 1962, and was buried on June 6, 1962, at Woodland Cemetery in Kitchener.
