= Nicholas Asmussen =

Canadian politician (1871-1941)

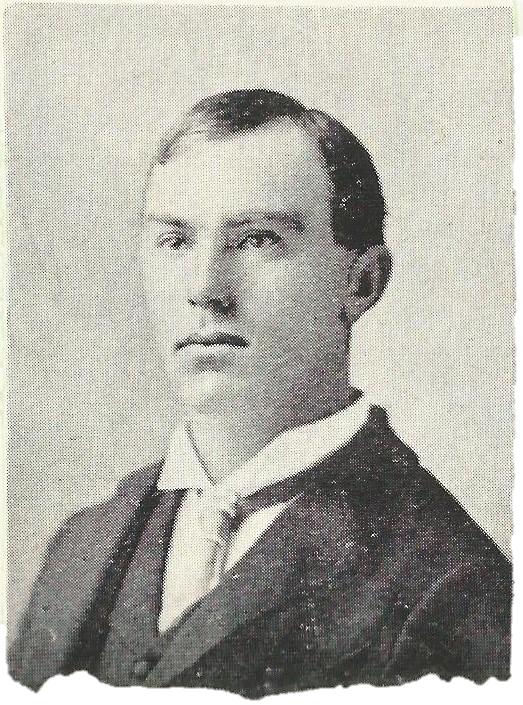
Asmussen

Nicholas Asmussen (April 14, 1871 – December 7, 1941) was a German-born Ontario building contractor and political figure. He represented Waterloo North in the Legislative Assembly of Ontario from 1919 to 1923 as an Independent Liberal and from 1934 to 1937 as a Liberal member.

He was born in Flensburg, Germany, the son of John and Catherina Asmussen, and came to Canada in 1878 with his family. He was educated in Berlin (later Kitchener). In 1908, he married Willisa Kesselring. Asmussen was mayor of Kitchener from 1925 to 1926.
