= John Richard Eden =

Canadian financial agent and politician from Ontario (1859 – after 1917

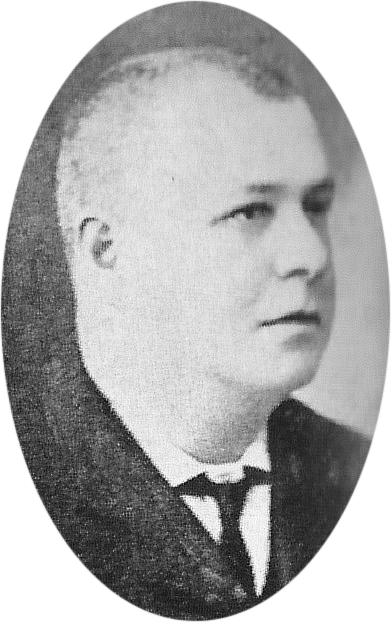
John R. Eden

John Richard Eden (October 14, 1859 – after 1917) was a financial agent and politician in Ontario, Canada. He served as mayor of Berlin from 1899 to 1900 and from 1902 to 1903.* Uttley, W.V. (Ben) (2010). A History of Kitchener, Ontario. p. 413. ISBN 1554588081.

He was born in Waterloo township, Waterloo County, Canada West. Eden served on the county council in 1897 and 1898.

After the name of the city was changed to Kitchener in 1916, Eden became a member of the executive of a group called the Citizens' League which was formed in opposition to the so-called British League which had lobbied for the name change. Candidates supported by the Citizens' League won out in the city elections held in 1917. The British League was not gracious in defeat and there were incidents of vandalism after the election results were announced. However, the new council announced their intent not to change the city's name back to Berlin.
