= Louis Breithaupt =

Louis Breithaupt may refer to:

- Louis Jacob Breithaupt (1855–1939), manufacturer and politician in Ontario, Canada
- Louis Orville Breithaupt (1890–1960), politician and Lieutenant Governor of Ontario
- Louis Breithaupt (tanner) (1827–1880), German-born tanner and politician in Ontario, Canada
