= Weichel =

Weichel is a surname. Notable people with the surname include:

- Alvin F. Weichel (1891–1956), American politician from Ohio
- Daniel Weichel (born 1984), German mixed martial artist
- Nicolai Weichel (born 1997), Danish ice hockey player
- Oscar Weichel (1894–1968), Canadian federal politician
- Per Weichel (born 1942), Danish sports shooter
- William George Weichel (1870–1949), Canadian merchant and politician
