= Albert Edward Matthews =

Canadian politician

The Honourable Albert Edward Matthews
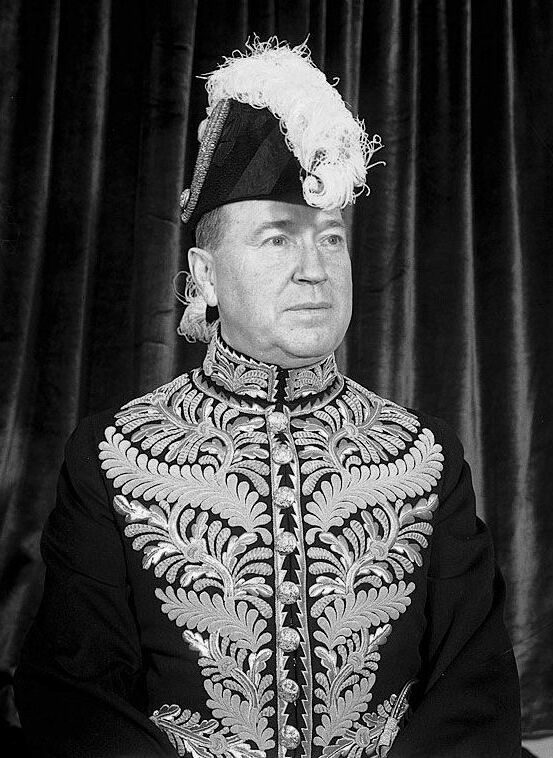
- Matthews, c. 1937–46

16th Lieutenant Governor of Ontario
- In office November 23, 1937 – December 26, 1946
- Monarch: George VI
- Governors General: The Lord Tweedsmuir; The Earl of Athlone; The Viscount Alexander of Tunis
- Premier: Mitchell Hepburn; Gordon Daniel Conant; Harry Nixon; George A. Drew
- Preceded by: Herbert Alexander Bruce
- Succeeded by: Ray Lawson

Personal details
- Born: May 17, 1873 Lindsay, Ontario
- Died: August 13, 1949 (aged 76) Windermere, Ontario
- Children: Bruce Matthews; Paul Matthews
- Profession: investment broker

Albert Edward Matthews (May 17, 1873 – December 16, 1949) was the 16th Lieutenant Governor of Ontario.

Matthews was born in Lindsay, Ontario. He worked as an investment broker in Toronto and rose to the position of director of various companies. Matthews served as Ontario's 16th Lieutenant Governor of Ontario from 1937 to 1946. He took office during the Great Depression while Mitchell Hepburn was Premier of Ontario. Hepburn had come to office promising to show austerity by curtailing the perks and privileges of, among others, the lieutenant-governor. Chorley Park, the grand official residence of the lieutenant-governor since 1915, was closed in the first year of Matthews' term and its contents auctioned off leaving him with a suite in the legislative buildings for official functions. As a result, Matthews did less official entertaining during his term in office at Queen's Park quarters than anticipated. He instead hosted royalty and other dignitaries at his Toronto estate.

Making many visits to churches, hospitals, military, civic, and government functions in his role as Lieutenant Governor of Ontario, Matthews brought a steady dignity to his service while in office. Highlights of his tenure include the August 18, 1938, opening with US President Franklin D. Roosevelt of the Thousand Islands Bridge, connecting Ontario to New York State. Matthews was also present for the first visit to Canada by a reigning Canadian monarch, King George VI, who was accompanied by his wife, Queen Elizabeth. Matthews and Ontario Premier Mitchell Hepburn officially welcomed the King and Queen to Queen's Park, Toronto, on May 22, 1939.

Matthews died in Windermere, Ontario, in 1949 and was buried in Mount Pleasant Cemetery, Toronto.

In 1960, to commemorate his lifetime of service in the Baptist Church, the Matthews Memorial Tower was built at McMaster Divinity College in Hamilton, Ontario.

One of his sons was World War II Major General and businessman Bruce Matthews and the other was Paul Matthews, a very successful Toronto stockbroker.

Government offices
Preceded by Herbert Alexander Bruce	Lieutenant Governor of Ontario; 1937–1946	Succeeded by Ray Lawson
