= Waterloo North =

Former federal electoral district in Ontario, Canada

Ontario electoral district

Defunct federal electoral district
- Legislature: House of Commons
- District created: 1867
- District abolished: 1966
- First contested: 1867
- Last contested: 1965

Waterloo North was a federal electoral district represented in the House of Commons of Canada from 1867 to 1968. It was located in the province of Ontario. It was created by the British North America Act 1867 which entitled each of north and south ridings of the County of Waterloo to elect one Member of Parliament.

The North Riding of Waterloo was defined in 1859 as consisting of the Townships of North Waterloo, Woolwich and Wellesley, and the Town of Berlin and Village of Waterloo.

In 1903, it was redefined to consist of the townships of North Waterloo, Wellesley and Woolwich, the towns of Berlin and Waterloo, and the village of Elmira. In 1924, it was redefined to consist of the townships of Wellesley and Woolwich, and the northern part of the township of Waterloo. In 1947, it was redefined to consist of the city of Kitchener, the town of Waterloo and the townships of Wellesley and Woolwich, and the northern part of the township of Waterloo.

The electoral district was abolished in 1966 when it was redistributed between Kitchener, Waterloo and Wellington—Grey ridings.

== Members of Parliament ==
Parliament	Years	Member	Party
1st	1867–1872	Isaac Erb Bowman	Liberal
2nd	1872–1874	Isaac Erb Bowman	Liberal
3rd	1874–1878	Isaac Erb Bowman	Liberal
4th	1878–1882	Hugo Kranz	Conservative
5th	1882–1887	Hugo Kranz	Conservative
6th	1887–1891	Isaac Erb Bowman	Liberal
7th	1891–1896	Isaac Erb Bowman	Liberal
8th	1896–1900	Joseph E. Seagram	Conservative
9th	1900–1904	Joseph E. Seagram	Conservative
10th	1904–1908	Joseph E. Seagram	Conservative
11th	1908–1909^{nb 1}	William Lyon Mackenzie King	Liberal
11th	1909–1911	William Lyon Mackenzie King	Liberal
12th	1911–1917	William George Weichel	Conservative
13th	1917–1921	William Daum Euler	Opposition (Laurier Liberals)
14th	1921–1925	William Daum Euler	Liberal
15th	1925–1926	William Daum Euler	Liberal
16th	1926–1926^{nb 1}	William Daum Euler	Liberal
16th	1926–1930	William Daum Euler	Liberal
17th	1930–1935	William Daum Euler	Liberal
18th	1935–1940	William Daum Euler	Liberal
19th	1940–1940	William Daum Euler	Liberal
19th	1940–1945	Louis Orville Breithaupt	Liberal
20th	1945–1949	Louis Orville Breithaupt	Liberal
21st	1949–1952	Louis Orville Breithaupt	Liberal
21st	1952–1953	Norman Schneider	Liberal
22nd	1953–1957	Norman Schneider	Liberal
23rd	1957–1958	Norman Schneider	Liberal
24th	1958–1962	Oscar Weichel	Progressive Conservative
25th	1962–1963	Oscar Weichel	Progressive Conservative
26th	1963–1965	Oscar Weichel	Progressive Conservative
27th	1965–1968	Kieth Hymmen	Liberal
Riding dissolved into Kitchener, Waterloo, and Wellington—Grey

Nb 1 Ministerial by-elections

== Electoral history ==
1867 Canadian federal election: Waterloo North
Party	Candidate	Votes	%	±%
Liberal	Isaac Erb Bowman	acclaimed		

1872 Canadian federal election: Waterloo North
Party	Candidate	Votes	%	±%
Liberal	Isaac Erb Bowman	acclaimed		

1874 Canadian federal election: Waterloo North
Party	Candidate	Votes	%	±%
Liberal	Isaac Erb Bowman	acclaimed		

1878 Canadian federal election: Waterloo North
Party	Candidate	Votes	%	±%
Conservative	Hugo Kranz	1,412		
Liberal	Isaac Erb Bowman	1,279		

1882 Canadian federal election: Waterloo North
Party	Candidate	Votes	%	±%
Conservative	Hugo Kranz	1,459		
Unknown	D. S. Bowlby	1,402		

1887 Canadian federal election: Waterloo North
Party	Candidate	Votes	%	±%
Liberal	Isaac Erb Bowman	2,080		
Conservative	Hugo Kranz	1,841		

1891 Canadian federal election: Waterloo North
Party	Candidate	Votes	%	±%
Liberal	Isaac Erb Bowman	2,289	50.95	
Conservative	Hugo Kranz	2,204	49.05	

1896 Canadian federal election: Waterloo North
Party	Candidate	Votes	%	±%
Conservative	Joseph E. Seagram	2,706		
Liberal	E. W. R. Snider	2,397		

1900 Canadian federal election: Waterloo North
Party	Candidate	Votes	%	±%
Conservative	Joseph E. Seagram	acclaimed		

1904 Canadian federal election: Waterloo North
Party	Candidate	Votes	%	±%
Conservative	Joseph E. Seagram	2,769		
Liberal	Edwin P. Clement	2,463		

1908 Canadian federal election
Party	Candidate	Votes	%	Elected
Liberal	William Lyon Mackenzie King	3,469	51.58	✓
Conservative	Richard Reid	3,206	47.67	
Independent	Allen Hubur	50	0.74	
Total valid votes		6,725	100.00	
Source(s) "Waterloo North, Ontario (1867-08-06 - 1968-04-22)". History of Federal Ridings Since 1867. Library of Parliament.

Canadian federal by-election, June 6, 1909 Federal Ministerial by-election for King's appointment as Minister of Labour on June 21, 1909
Party	Candidate	Votes	Elected
Liberal	William Lyon Mackenzie King	acclaimed	✓
Total valid votes		-	-
Source(s) "Waterloo North, Ontario (1867-08-06 - 1968-04-22)". History of Federal Ridings Since 1867. Library of Parliament.

1911 Canadian federal election
Party	Candidate	Votes	%	Elected
Conservative	William George Weichel	3,774	52.18	✓
Liberal	William Lyon Mackenzie King	3,459	47.82	
Total valid votes		7,223	100.00	
Source(s) "Waterloo North, Ontario (1867-08-06 - 1968-04-22)". History of Federal Ridings Since 1867. Library of Parliament.

1917 Canadian federal election
Party	Candidate	Votes	%	Elected
Opposition (Laurier Liberals)	William Daum Euler	5,435	58.91	✓
Government (Unionist)	William George Weichel	3,571	38.71	
Labour	Mervyn Smith	220	2.38	
Total valid votes		9,226	100.00	
Source(s) "Waterloo North, Ontario (1867-08-06 - 1968-04-22)". History of Federal Ridings Since 1867. Library of Parliament.

1921 Canadian federal election: Waterloo North
Party	Candidate	Votes	%	±%
Liberal	William Daum Euler	7,466		
Progressive	John Emil Hett	4,994		

1925 Canadian federal election: Waterloo North
Party	Candidate	Votes	%	±%
Liberal	William Daum Euler	8,868		
Conservative	Edwin Hamilton Scully	4,657		

1926 Canadian federal election: Waterloo North
Party	Candidate	Votes	%	±%
Liberal	William Daum Euler	10,394		
Conservative	David Gross	6,365		

By-election: On Mr. Euler being appointed Minister of Customs and Excise, 2 November 1926: Waterloo North
Party	Candidate	Votes	%	±%
Liberal	William Daum Euler	acclaimed		

1930 Canadian federal election: Waterloo North
Party	Candidate	Votes	%	±%
Liberal	William Daum Euler	12,785		
Conservative	Karl Kenneth Homuth	9,732		

1935 Canadian federal election: Waterloo North
Party	Candidate	Votes	%	±%
Liberal	William Daum Euler	12,832		
Conservative	Charles Casper Hahn	4,084		
Co-operative Commonwealth	John Walter	3,313		

1940 Canadian federal election: Waterloo North
Party	Candidate	Votes	%	±%
Liberal	William Daum Euler	14,172		
National Government	Stanley Francis Leavine	6,694		
Co-operative Commonwealth	Enoch Honsberger	1,597		

By-election: On Mr. Euler being appointed to the Senate, 19 August 1940: Waterloo North
Party	Candidate	Votes	%	±%
Liberal	Louis Orville Breithaupt	8,826		
Unknown	Stanley Francis Leavine	5,436		

1945 Canadian federal election: Waterloo North
Party	Candidate	Votes	%	±%
Liberal	Louis Orville Breithaupt	15,791		
Progressive Conservative	John William Bailey	7,635		
Co-operative Commonwealth	Stanton Lautenschlager	4,394		
Labor–Progressive	George Urbanz	581		

1949 Canadian federal election: Waterloo North
Party	Candidate	Votes	%	±%
Liberal	Louis Orville Breithaupt	17,715		
Progressive Conservative	Harvey J. Graber	7,229		
Co-operative Commonwealth	John S. Wagner	7,141		

By-election: On Mr. Bretihaupt's resignation to become Lieutenant-Governor of Ontario, 26 May 1952: Waterloo North
Party	Candidate	Votes	%	±%
Liberal	Norman Schneider	12,436		
Progressive Conservative	Elizabeth Janzen	10,892		
Co-operative Commonwealth	Leonard Schroeder	4,701		

1953 Canadian federal election: Waterloo North
Party	Candidate	Votes	%	±%
Liberal	Norman Schneider	16,139		
Progressive Conservative	Elizabeth Janzen	10,751		
Co-operative Commonwealth	Theodore H. Isley	4,654		
Social Credit	Henry Herbert Sigmund Emel	671		

1957 Canadian federal election: Waterloo North
Party	Candidate	Votes	%	±%
Liberal	Norman Schneider	15,972		
Progressive Conservative	Frank Costello	13,458		
Co-operative Commonwealth	Russell Honsberger	7,406		
Social Credit	Ethel Kleinknecht Koehler	901		

1958 Canadian federal election: Waterloo North
Party	Candidate	Votes	%	±%
Progressive Conservative	Oscar Weichel	24,526		
Liberal	Norman Schneider	15,206		
Co-operative Commonwealth	Russell Honsberger	5,148		

1962 Canadian federal election: Waterloo North
Party	Candidate	Votes	%	±%
Progressive Conservative	Oscar Weichel	21,262		
Liberal	Harold Paikin	17,762		
New Democratic	Russell Honsberger	7,722		
Social Credit	William Pavlik	1,260		

1963 Canadian federal election: Waterloo North
Party	Candidate	Votes	%	±%
Progressive Conservative	Oscar Weichel	22,007		
Liberal	Donald Weber	21,366		
New Democratic	John Walter	6,200		
Social Credit	M. Lauer	1,157		

1965 Canadian federal election: Waterloo North
Party	Candidate	Votes	%	±%
Liberal	Kieth Hymmen	24,733		
Progressive Conservative	Fred Speckeen	17,790		
New Democratic	Morley Rosenberg	11,074		

== See also ==
- List of Canadian electoral districts
- Historical federal electoral districts of Canada
