= Refugee Education Council =

Canadian government advisory body

- Formation: 2021
- Headquarters: Ottawa

The Refugee Education Council is a Government of Canada advisory body that works to include the voices of refugees in refugee-education programs.

It was founded in 2021 as part of wider attempts by the Government of Canada to include refugees in decision making. The creation of the group has been described by OpenCanada as "promising" and was welcomed by Right to Play.

In 2022, the group presented a manifesto to further increase inclusion.

== Organization ==
The council was founded in 2021 as part of a wider package of efforts called Together for Learning. The founding of the council was described by OpenCanada as "promising", and Right to Play welcomed the launch.

Council members include community leaders, parents, teachers, and youth advocates. The group is housed by World Vision Canada and supported by the Canadian International Education Policy Working Group (network of organisations).

The council exists to increase the participation of refugees in the design and delivery of educational programs.

In March 2022, at the Government of Canada's Together for Learning summit the council presented its manifesto A Vision for the Education of Refugee and Displaced Learners calling for more inclusion of refugees beyond just the group of fifteen members.

=== Membership ===
Refugee Education Council Members
Name	National affiliations(s)
Anojitha Sivaskaran	Sri Lanka
Istarlin Abdi	South Sudan, Somalia
Bikienga Amdiatou	Burkina Faso
Suleman Arshad	Pakistan
Laura Barbosa	Colombia, Canada
Malual Bol Kiir	South Sudan, Canada
Nhial Deng	Kenya, Ethiopia
Amelie Fabian	Canada, Rwanda
Qais Ghasan Abdulrazzaq	Jordan, Syria
Moriom Khatun	Bangladesh
Christine Mwongera	Kenya
Nabaloum Pascaline	Burkina Faso
Yvana Portillo	Venezuela, Peru
Asma Ghazi	Afghanistan/Italy
