= Kieth Hymmen =

Canadian politician

MP for Waterloo North
- In office January 18, 1965 – June 24, 1968
- Preceded by: Mike Weichel
- Succeeded by: riding dissolved

MP for Kitchener
- In office June 25, 1968 – May 9, 1974
- Preceded by: first member
- Succeeded by: Patrick Flynn

Personal details
- Born: June 13, 1913 Berlin, Ontario, Canada
- Died: January 16, 1978 (aged 64)
- Party: Liberal
- Occupation: Chemical engineer

Kieth Reinhardt Hymmen (June 13, 1913 – January 16, 1978) was a Canadian politician. A member of the Liberal Party, he represented the Waterloo North electoral district from 1965 to 1968, and Kitchener electoral district from 1968 to 1974, in the House of Commons.

The son of Horace Hymmen and Clara Dunke, he was educated in Kitchener and at the University of Toronto. Hymmen became a chemical engineer in Kitchener. In 1940, he married Ruth Amelia Iredale. He served on Kitchener city council and was mayor of Kitchener for six months in 1958 and again from 1963 to 1965. He died in 1978 and was buried at Mount Hope Cemetery in Kitchener.
