= Louis Breithaupt (tanner) =

Canadian politician

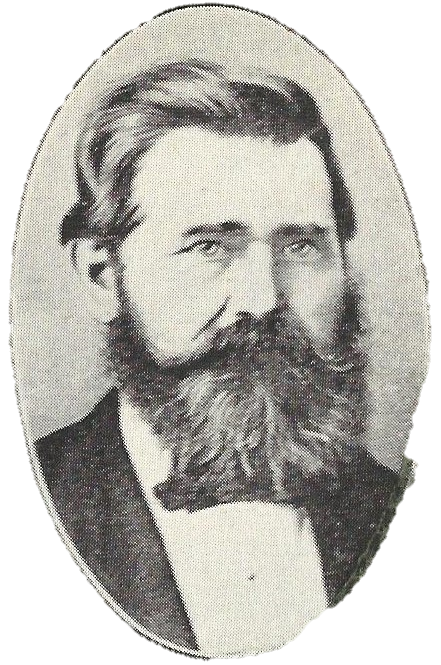
- Breithaupt
- Born: Philip Ludwig Breithaupt; 8 November 1827; Allendorf, Electorate of Hesse
- Died: 3 July 1880 (aged 52); Berlin, Ontario, Canada
- Burial place: Mount Hope Cemetery, Kitchener, Ontario, Canada
- Occupations: Tanner, politician
- Organization: Breithaupt Leather Company
- Office: Mayor of Berlin, Ontario
- Predecessor: Hugo Kranz
- Successor: John Motz
- Spouse: Catharine Hailer (m. 1853–1880)
- Children: 11, including Louis Jacob
- Parents: Liborius Breithaupt (father); Catherine Goetze (mother)

Philip Ludwig "Louis" Breithaupt (8 November 1827 – 3 July 1880) was a German-born tanner and politician in Ontario, Canada. He served as mayor of Berlin (today known as Kitchener) from 1879 to 1880.

== Biography ==
The son of Liborius Breithaupt, a tanner, and Catherine Goetze, he was born in Allendorf, Kurhessen, which today is a part of Germany. He received an ordinary education in Germany, and there he was partially trained as a tanner by his father, Liborius, who was the fourth generation of tanners in the Breithaupt family. Liborius and his family left Bremen, Germany in November 1843, arriving in New York City in January 1844, and settled in Buffalo, New York. Liborius, with Louis assisting him, opened a small tannery in Buffalo located on Seneca Street, which mostly processed sheepskins. This situation continued until 1851, when Liborius died, and Louis took over the business, continuing to operate it under the name "L. Breithaupt". In 1852, he took on a partner, Jacob F. Schoellkopf, a Buffalo financier whom at the time was investing heavily in the tanning industry. Together they expanded the business and in 1855 they purchased another existing tannery in North Evans, New York.

On a trip to Canada to buy sheepskins, Breithaupt met his future wife, Catharine Hailer of Berlin. She was the daughter of wheelwright Jacob Hailer, who was an early German settler in Berlin. They were married on 8 February 1853, beginning the process that would end with Breithaupt relocating himself to Berlin. His three eldest sons, Louis Jacob, William Henry, and John Christian, who would later become locally prominent in their own right, were born in Buffalo before the move, in 1855, 1857, and 1859 respectively. In 1857, Breithaupt opened a tannery in Berlin in partnership with his new brother-in-law, Jacob Wagner, who soon died in the next year of 1858. Breithaupt at first tried to manage the Berlin tannery from Buffalo, but was frustrated by the situation, and ultimately made the decision to relocate to Berlin and concentrate his business operations there. He did so in 1861, selling off his share in the business he had started with his father to Schoellkopf and focusing entirely on managing his Berlin tannery.

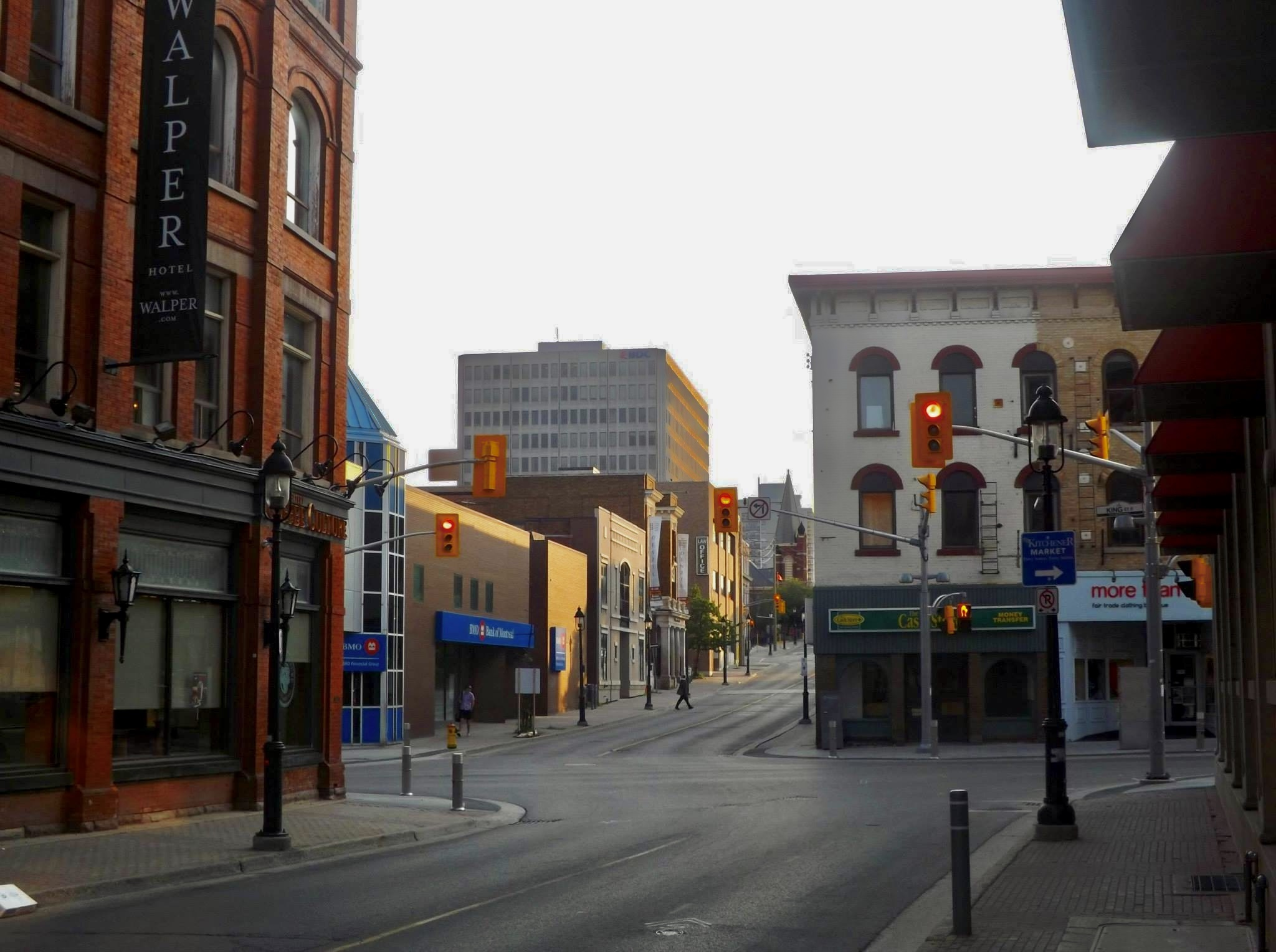
King and Queen Streets, Kitchener, in 2015. The American Block can be seen to the right, across the intersection.

Breithaupt quickly became a prominent local figure in Berlin. In 1862, he paid $10,000 for the construction of the three-storey American Block at the northeast corner of King Street and Queen Street. This multi-purpose commercial building contained storefronts along King Street which were rented out to merchants, as well as a hotel entrance (along with its bar and hall) and the entrance to his office and leather goods store along Queen Street. The upper floors were used for hotel rooms in what was known as the American Hotel, possibly due to Breithaupt's American origins. Some of the American Block's earliest mercantile tenants included Tyson's Grocery and a boot and shoe store owned by William Niehaus, both occupying King Street storefronts.

In 1866, Breithaupt was elected to the Waterloo County council, and in 1867 his tanning business (known periodically as the Eagle Tannery) was prominently advertising the sale of sole leather, leather findings, and bookbinders' stock, among other goods, at his retail store on Queen Street within the American Block. He suffered a significant setback that year when his tannery was destroyed by fire, but he rebuilt and continued, and was elected as deputy reeve of Berlin. His tannery suffered another fire in 1870, but was again rebuilt. Breithaupt continued his investment in Berlin real estate and began paying for the construction of houses, such as rental properties built in 1872 and 1876, as well as Sonneck House, his own suburban home, which was built in 1874 in Italianate style and which prominently featured stained glass work. He was elected as a county councillor again in 1876, and reached the zenith of his political career when he was elected as mayor of Berlin in 1879.

In 1880, while still in office as the mayor of Berlin, Louis Breithaupt died. He is buried in Kitchener's Mount Hope Cemetery. His three sons co-managed the Breithaupt leather company after his death, and the firm would continue under family management and ownership until its sale in 1967.

== Descendants ==
The following chart displays some notable members of the Breithaupt family and their parents, and does not include all people in the family.

Breithaupt family tree

Philip Ludwig Breithaupt (1827–1880)
Emma Alvarena Devitt (1860–1925)	Louis Jacob Breithaupt (1855–1939)
Rosa Breithaupt Hewetson Clark (1888–1981)	Louis Orville Breithaupt (1890–1960)

Catharine Hailer (1834–1910)
Albert Liborius Breithaupt (1870–1955)	Lydia Louisa Anthes (1877–1942)
Rudolph Anthes Breithaupt (1906–1960)	Marion Gertrude Elizabeth Martha Roos (1909–2011)
James Roos Breithaupt (1934–2018)

== See also ==
- List of German Canadians
