= Elizabeth Janzen Dreger =

Canadian politician and businesswoman (1917–1979)

- Born: August 11, 1917; Berlin, Ontario, Canada
- Died: 1979
- Spouse: Fred L. Dreger
- Relatives: Henry L. Janzen

Elizabeth Janzen Dreger (1917–1979) was a Canadian politician and businesswoman.

Dreger was born August 11, 1917, in Berlin (now Kitchener), Ontario. The youngest of five children born to Rose and Charles Janzen, she was the granddaughter of Henry L. Janzen, the former mayor of Berlin. In 1919, her family moved to a 187-acre farm in Breslau, Ontario where her father operated a greenhouse and nursery. After attending Moulton College in Toronto, she studied at the MacDonald Institute in Guelph, Ontario graduating with a degree in household science. Dreger later completed a six-month business college course, taking over as secretary at her family's real estate business, where she worked in various capacities for twenty-five years. Dreger married lawyer and former Kitchener mayor Fred Dreger on September 24, 1960.

Dreger's career in politics began in 1940, when she attended a local meeting that resulted in the eventual founding of the Waterloo North Conservative Women's Association. She was elected to a three-year term as president of the association in 1942. Beginning in 1948, she served for four years as president of the Western Ontario PC's Women's Association, prior to becoming president of the Women's PC Advisory Committee of Ontario. In 1952, Dreger was selected as the first woman from Kitchener to run for the House of Commons. She ran as a candidate in riding of Waterloo North in a 1952 by-election to replace Louis Orville Breithaupt after his appointment as Lieutenant-Governor of Ontario and again in 1953 federal election. In both cases, she lost to Liberal candidate Norman Schneider. Dreger went on to be named president of the Progressive Conservative Women's Association of Canada in 1956. The same year, she was an organizer of the PC leadership convention where John Diefenbaker succeeded George A. Drew. She travelled frequently as part of her women's association duties working to raise awareness about the role of women in politics, which she juggled while running the family farm. She took over as homemaker at the farm after her mother died in 1957.

In addition to her political involvements and realty career, Janzen was an active member of the Kitchener community. She was a charter member of the Ontario Press Council, served on the first board of the Ontario Pioneer Community Foundation and was on the Board of Governors of the University of Waterloo from 1972 to 1975. Dreger was involved with the Kitchener Horticultural Society, serving at one point as president, and she was a member of the Benton Street Baptist Church. She also took on various executive positions within the local YWCA and served for a time as treasurer of the national branch of the organization.

Dreger died in 1979.
