= Tribune (architecture) =

Stage for speeches

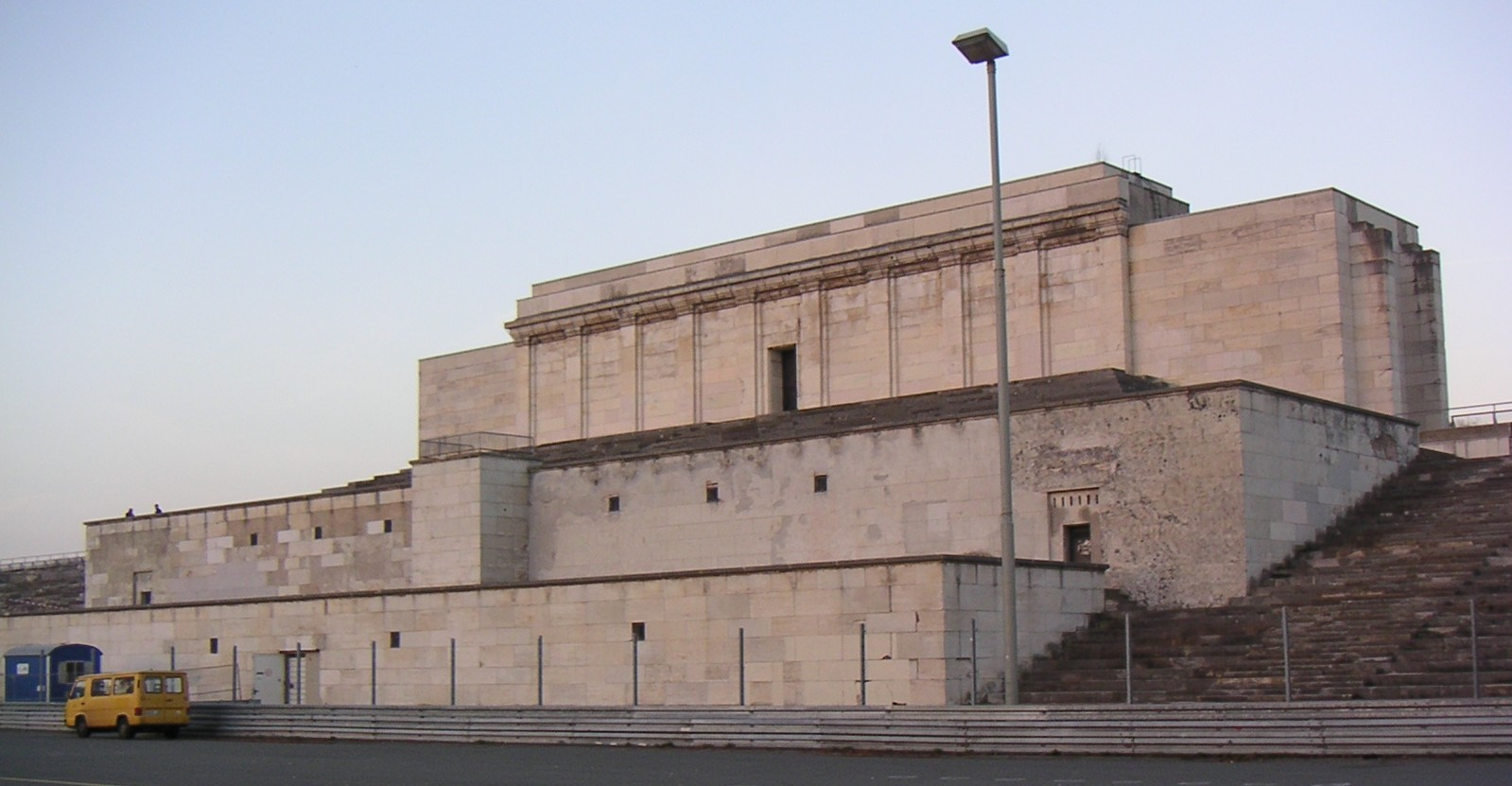
Example of a 20th-century tribune: The Zeppelinhaupttribüne (1934) at the Nazi Party Rally grounds, Nuremberg, Germany.

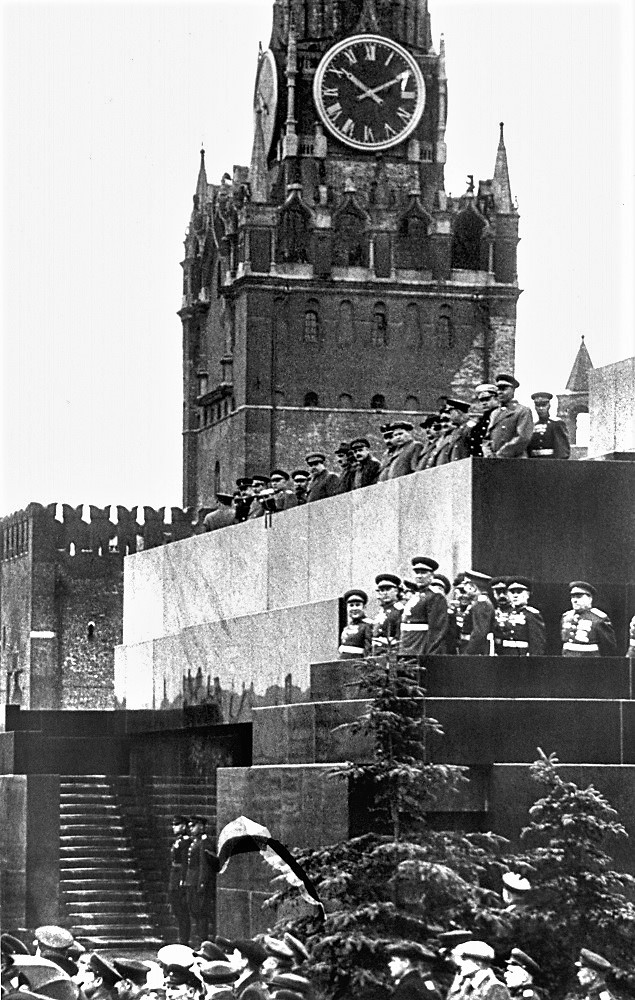
Lenin's Mausoleum served as a viewing tribune for Soviet leaders to watch military parades on Red Square, such as this one in June 1945.

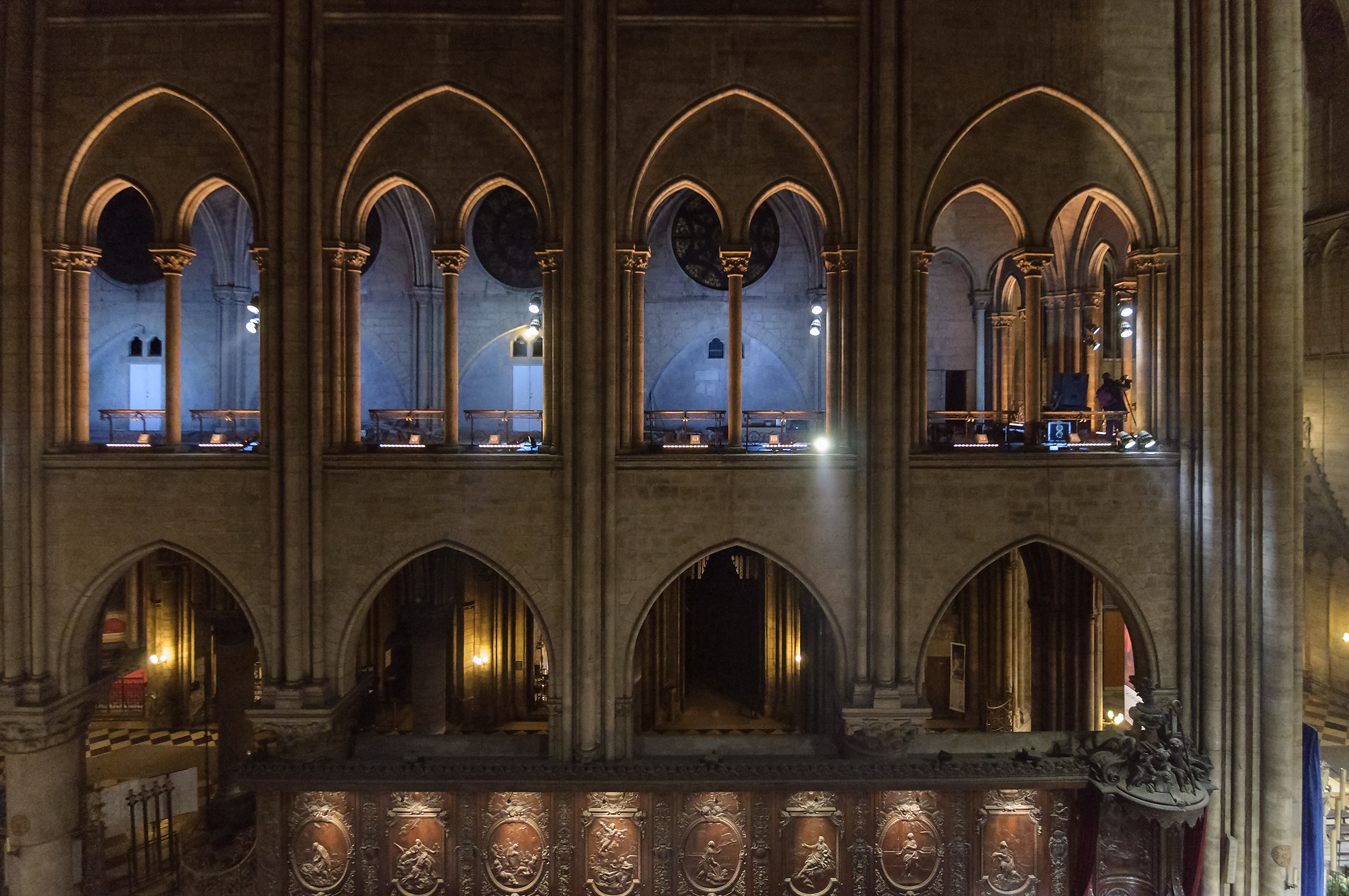
Early gothic tribune gallery inside Notre-Dame de Paris, France.

Tribune is an ambiguous – and often misused – architectural term, which can have several meanings. Today, it most often refers to a dais or stage-like platform or, in a vaguer sense, any place from which a speech can be prominently made.

== Etymology ==
The English term tribune was derived as early as 1762 from French (tribune) and Italian (tribuna) words. These in turn stemmed from Medieval Latin tribuna and from Classical Latin tribunal, the elevated position of a tribune's (or other Roman magistrate's) seat for official functions in the manner of a throne.

== Meanings ==
Below are some of the more specific uses of the term tribune:

1. In Ancient Rome, the tribune referred to the area contained by the semicircular apse of a basilica, so-named because it was where a raised platform was placed on which a presiding magistrate – sometimes a tribune – had their seat and made speeches to the crowd.
2. Meaning (1) later evolved to mean any raised structure from which important officials could appear to the public and give speeches, including the makeshift wooden structures in the Roman Forum, or the private box of the emperor at the Circus Maximus. In recent times, examples of this kind of tribune are the Zeppelinhaupttribüne at the Nazi Party Rally grounds, or the viewing platform for Soviet leaders at Lenin's Mausoleum.
3. Meaning (1) was also transferred into ecclesiastical architecture, where tribune sometimes describes the area contained within the vaulted or domed semicircular apse of Christian churches, many of which have adopted the Roman basilica plan. But unlike the Roman basilica, the tribune of a corresponding Christian basilica is usually reserved for a high altar or bishop's seat (cathedra). Examples can be seen at San Clemente in Rome, Sant'Apollinare in Classe in Ravenna, San Zeno at Verona, or San Miniato near Florence. A secular example is the celebrated octagon room of the Uffizi Palace at Florence.
4. The tribune may also refer to an elevated gallery or balcony running along the interior of a church (or, if used broadly, any large hall). In Romanesque and Early Gothic architecture, the tribune gallery was one of the storeys constituting the distinctive three- or four-storey interior elevation of a cathedral nave. Typically, this was a walkway with an open arcade overlooking the nave, situated directly above the level of the aisle arcade and below the level of the triforium (a similar, narrower gallery) and/or the clerestory (the windows in the upper wall). In this sense, a tribune might also be known as a matroneum. Architectural historian Nikolaus Pevsner, in his guidebook series The Buildings of England, asserts that the tribune and the triforium, while often confused, are not the same thing.
5. The term is also loosely applied to various other raised spaces inside secular or ecclesiastical buildings – in the latter sometimes in the place of pulpit, as in the Priory of Saint-Martin-des-Champs at Paris. Thus, tribune can refer to a dais or stage-like platform, or in a vaguer sense any place within a building from which a speech can be prominently made, which seems a return to the original function of the early Roman tribune. This is the origin of the common metaphorical use of "tribune" in the names of newspapers, magazines and broadcast news programs.
