= John Reimer =

Canadian politician

- Born: July 16, 1936 (age 89); Kitchener, Ontario, Canada
- Education: University of Toronto; Ontario College of Education; University of Waterloo
- Occupations: Politician, educator
- Political party: Progressive Conservative Canadian Alliance
- Children: 2

John Henry Reimer (born July 16, 1936) is a Canadian politician. He served in the House of Commons of Canada from 1979 to 1980, and again from 1984 to 1993, as a member of the Progressive Conservative Party.

Reimer was born to a Mennonite family in Kitchener, Ontario. He was educated at the University of Toronto, the Ontario College of Education and the University of Waterloo, and holds Bachelor of Arts, Master of Arts and Bachelor of Education degrees. He worked as an educator before entering political life, and served on the board of governors of Wilfrid Laurier University for four years.

He was first elected to the House of Commons in the 1979 election, defeating Liberal candidate David Cooke by over 6,000 votes in Kitchener. He served as a backbench supporter of Joe Clark's minority government, and lost to Liberal Peter Lang by 1,512 votes in the 1980 election which was called after Clark's government lost a motion of no confidence.

Reimer was returned to the Commons in the 1984 election, defeating Lang by over 10,000 votes as the Progressive Conservatives won a landslide majority government under Brian Mulroney. He was re-elected by a narrower margin in 1988, and served for nine years as a backbench supporter of the Mulroney and Kim Campbell governments. In 1987, his private motion to include property rights in the Canadian Bill of Rights was approved by the house.

Reimer was defeated in 1993, finishing third against historian and Liberal candidate John English. He sought a return to Parliament in the newly constituted riding of Kitchener Centre during the 1997 election, but finished a distant second against new Liberal candidate Karen Redman.

Reimer was on the right-wing of the Progressive Conservative Party, and left the party to join the newly formed Canadian Alliance in 2000. He campaigned under the Alliance's banner in the 2000 federal election. He lost to Liberal Lynn Myers in Waterloo—Wellington.

Reimer is a social conservative, and in 2000 called for a law making abortion illegal in Canada.

In 2004, he endorsed Frank Klees to lead the Progressive Conservative Party of Ontario.

== See also ==
- List of University of Waterloo people

Parliament of Canada
Preceded by Patrick Flynn, Liberal	Member of Parliament for Kitchener; 1979–1980	Succeeded by Peter Lang, Liberal
Preceded by Peter Lang, Liberal	Member of Parliament for Kitchener; 1984–1993	Succeeded by John English, Liberal
