= Kitchener (federal electoral district) =

Former federal electoral district in Ontario, Canada

Ontario electoral district

Defunct federal electoral district
- Legislature: House of Commons
- District created: 1966
- District abolished: 1996
- First contested: 1968
- Last contested: 1993

Kitchener was a federal electoral district represented in the House of Commons of Canada from 1968 to 1997. It was located in the province of Ontario. This riding was created in 1966 from parts of Waterloo North and Waterloo South ridings.

It initially consisted of the City of Kitchener, Ontario.

In 1976, it was redefined to exclude the northeastern part of the city.

The electoral district was abolished in 1996 when it was redistributed between Kitchener Centre and Waterloo—Wellington ridings.

== Members of Parliament ==
Kitchener
| Parliament | Years | Member | Party |
|---|---|---|---|
Riding created from Waterloo North and Waterloo South
| 28th | 1968–1972 | Kieth Hymmen | Liberal |
| 29th | 1972–1974 | Kieth Hymmen | Liberal |
| 30th | 1974–1979 | Patrick Flynn | Liberal |
| 31st | 1979–1980 | John Reimer | Progressive Conservative |
| 32nd | 1980–1984 | Peter Lang | Liberal |
| 33rd | 1984–1988 | John Reimer | Progressive Conservative |
| 34th | 1988–1993 | John Reimer | Progressive Conservative |
| 35th | 1993–1997 | John English | Liberal |
Riding dissolved into Kitchener Centre and Waterloo—Wellington

== Election results ==
1968 Canadian federal election
| Party | Candidate | Votes |
|---|---|---|
| Liberal | Kieth Hymmen | 16,471 |
| New Democratic | Morley Rosenberg | 12,799 |
| Progressive Conservative | Jack Young | 11,217 |

1972 Canadian federal election
| Party | Candidate | Votes |
|---|---|---|
| Liberal | Kieth Hymmen | 18,351 |
| Progressive Conservative | Barney Lawrence | 18,104 |
| New Democratic | Mike Sheppard | 11,272 |

1974 Canadian federal election
| Party | Candidate | Votes |
|---|---|---|
| Liberal | Patrick Flynn | 21,091 |
| Progressive Conservative | Barney Lawrence | 15,965 |
| New Democratic | Susan Surich | 10,859 |
| Communist | Theresa Crowley | 146 |
| Marxist–Leninist | Gail Margaret Rathwell | 112 |

1979 Canadian federal election
| Party | Candidate | Votes |
|---|---|---|
| Progressive Conservative | John Reimer | 23,230 |
| Liberal | David Cooke | 16,900 |
| New Democratic | James Herman | 11,345 |
| Libertarian | Rodney C. Wilton | 214 |
| Communist | Paul Pugh | 83 |
| Marxist–Leninist | Jeff Conway | 81 |

1980 Canadian federal election
| Party | Candidate | Votes |
|---|---|---|
| Liberal | Peter Lang | 19,502 |
| Progressive Conservative | John Reimer | 17,990 |
| New Democratic | James Herman | 11,494 |
| Libertarian | Ron Bailey | 309 |
| Rhinoceros | Douglas Wright | 292 |
| Marxist–Leninist | Jeff Conway | 59 |

1984 Canadian federal election
| Party | Candidate | Votes |
|---|---|---|
| Progressive Conservative | John Reimer | 26,710 |
| Liberal | Peter Lang | 16,130 |
| New Democratic | Will Ferguson | 13,873 |
| Libertarian | Gerald Myszkowiec | 306 |

1988 Canadian federal election
| Party | Candidate | Votes |
|---|---|---|
| Progressive Conservative | John Reimer | 22,400 |
| Liberal | John English | 19,344 |
| New Democratic | Sue Coulter | 11,571 |
| Libertarian | Joel Tarback | 211 |
| Not affiliated | Anna Di Carlo | 114 |

1993 Canadian federal election
| Party | Candidate | Votes |
|---|---|---|
| Liberal | John English | 26,379 |
| Reform | Reg Gosse | 12,107 |
| Progressive Conservative | John Reimer | 10,281 |
| New Democratic | Ian MacFarlane | 2,355 |
| Christian Heritage | Pat Schiebel | 474 |
| Natural Law | Katherine Finlay | 438 |
| Libertarian | Joel Tarback | 164 |

== See also ==
- List of Canadian electoral districts
- Historical federal electoral districts of Canada
