= Elmira, Ontario =

Elmira
- Unincorporated community
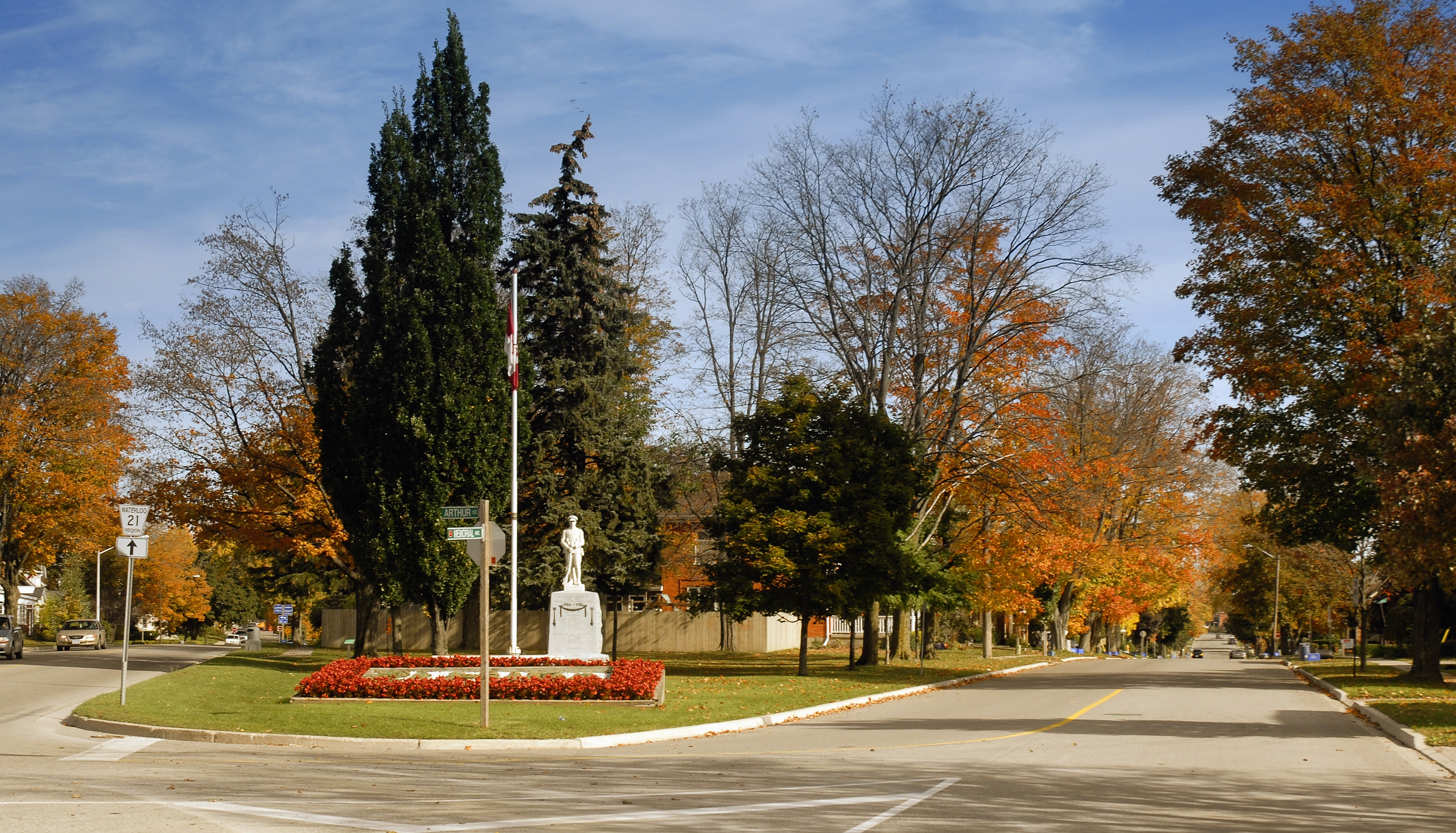

- Location within Regional Municipality of Waterloo Location within Southern Ontario
- Coordinates: 43°35′36″N 80°33′45″W
- Country: Canada
- Province: Ontario
- Regional municipality: Waterloo
- Township: Woolwich
- Settled: 1798

Population (2016)
  - Total: 10,161
- Time zone: UTC-5 (EST)
  - Summer (DST): UTC-4 (EDT)
- Forward sortation area: N3B
- Area code(s): 519 and 226
- NTS Map: 40P10 Conestogo
- GNBC Code: FEHOW

Elmira is the largest community in the township of Woolwich, Ontario, Canada. It is 15 kilometres (9 mi) north of the city of Waterloo near the Regional Municipality of Waterloo's northern border with Wellington County. The community was listed in the 2016 Canadian census as having a population of 10,161.

Waterloo Region is home to the largest population of Old Order Mennonites in Canada, particularly around St Jacobs and Elmira. They are often seen on the local roads using traditional horse and buggy transportation; many also use horses to pull the implements in their farm fields.

== History ==
The land comprising Woolwich Township belonged to the Huron Nation, then to the Mohawk Nation. The first European settlers arrived in Woolwich Township in the late 18th century. In 1798, William Wallace was one of the first settlers after he was deeded 86,078 acres (348 km^{2}) of land on the Grand River for $16,364. A block three of First Nations Lands, this area now comprises a large part of Woolwich Township. The parcel of land called "Woolwich" was named after Woolwich in England. The early settlers were primarily from England or Ireland until about 1830.

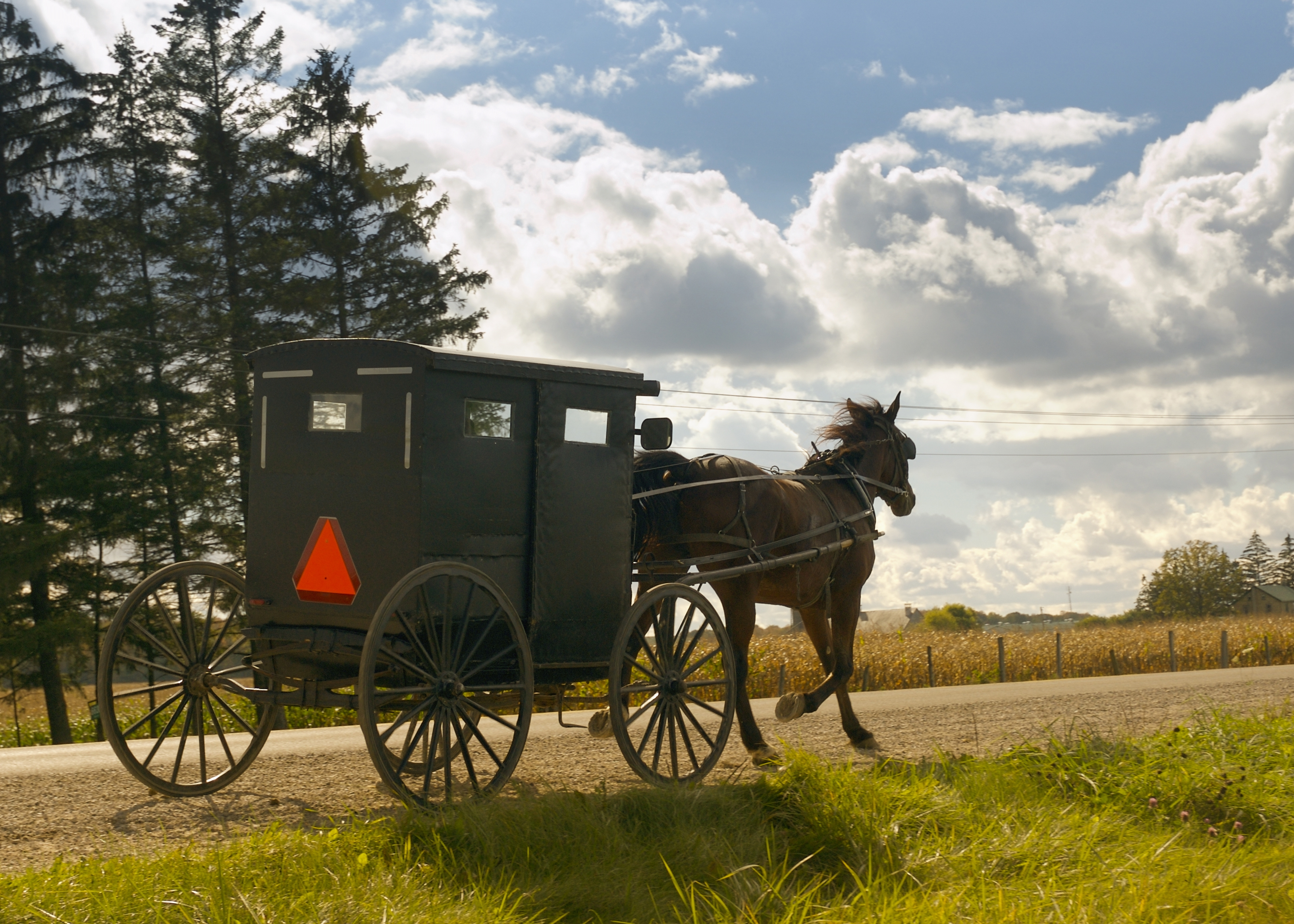
Mennonite Buggy

In 1806, Wallace sold the major portion of his tract to Mennonites from Pennsylvania, the so-called Pennsylvania Dutch (actually Deitsch or German). The buyers were Augustus Jones and brothers John and Jacob Erb, trustees for the German Company, who were among the first settlers from Pennsylvania. Wallace sold 45,185 acres (183 km^{2}) of land to the German Company at $1.00 an acre.

The village was settled in 1832 by Henry Christman and Edward Bristow. In 1834, Edward Bristow from Sussex, England became one of Elmira's first European settlers when he purchased 53 acres (210,000 m^{2}) of land at this location for 50 cents per acre. He started the first store, tavern and potashery. A community by the name of Bristow's Corners was already in existence in 1839 when a post office was assigned there. Local merchant Samuel Weber had been visiting New York State in the early 1850s and was apparently impressed with Elmira, New York. This may have been a factor in the decision of Woolwich Township council on February 22, 1853, to rename the community Elmira.

The post office opened in 1850. A historic property, Bristow's Inn was just land when it was sold by Edward Bristow to Jacob W. Bowman who first built a farmhouse there in 1860 (now 80 Arthur Street South, Elmira). In 1989 the structure was restored to its original appearance and became the Country Inn. Afterwards, the building was recognized under the Ontario Heritage Act.

As in the nearby townships, Mennonites formed a significant proportion of the population.

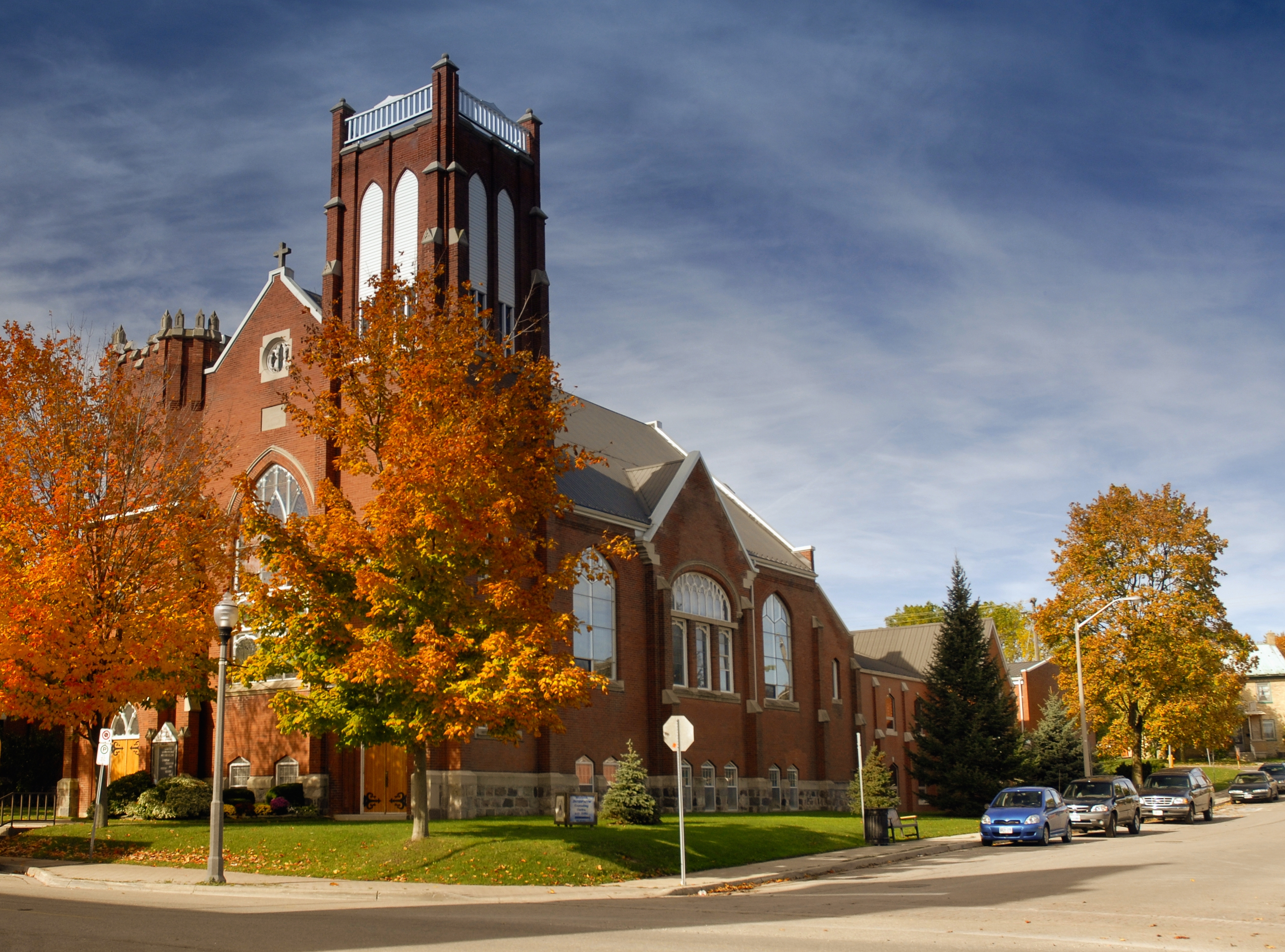
St. James Lutheran Church

In addition to Mennonites from Pennsylvania, the majority of settlers were from Germany by the 1850s. Families living in Elmira in that era included Oswald, Esch, Steffler, Dreisinger, Braun and Schedewitz. Many were Lutherans. By 1852 the St. James Lutheran Church had been built and was in operation.

The stores and tradesmen served farmers who lived in the surrounding area. The population in 1869 was about 450, increasing to about 1,069 by 1891. Major events that attracted people from outside the village included the Woolwich Agricultural Fair (since 1854) and the Elmira Maple Syrup Festival (since 1965) which is still held every year.

In 1861, the Elmira House (a large store) was erected as numerous artisans and merchants came to Elmira to earn a living. As a result, Elmira became known as an 'enterprising' community. In December 1886, Elmira entered a new chapter of its history with the incorporation of the settlement as a village by charter. At this date, the population of the newly incorporated village was 760 people. Throughout the 1870s and 1880s, Elmira acquired a brass band (1873) and a library (1886, Elmira Mechanics' Institute) with an initial membership of 20 people. In 1913, a large Carnegie Library was built with grant money from American industrialist Andrew Carnegie.

By 1864, the village had a large tannery, a lumber mill, and three churches, two German Lutheran and one Wesleyan Methodist and an elementary school. The population was 400. The railway arrived in the late 1800s, both the Grand Trunk and the Canadian Pacific. After this method of transportation became available, furniture manufacturing and other industries began to open.

In the early 1900s, North Waterloo County – the Kitchener, Waterloo, St. Jacobs, Elmira area – exhibited a strong German culture and those of German origin made up a third of the population in 1911. Lutherans were the primary religious group. There were nearly three times as many Lutherans as Mennonites by that time. The latter primarily resided in the rural areas and small communities.

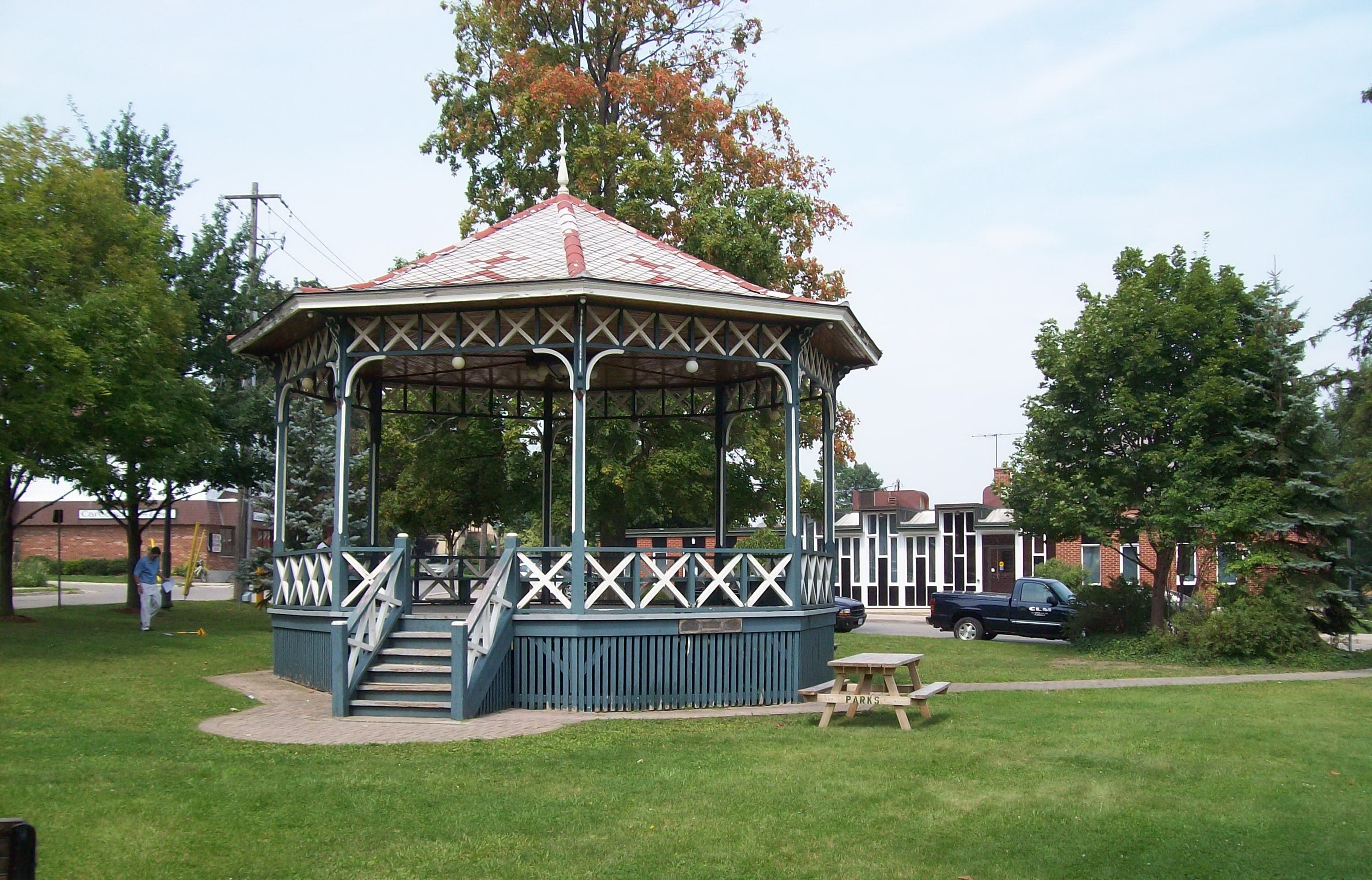
Gore Park Bandstand

In 1908, the first cinema opened in Elmira. The Theatorium initially ran silent movies with music provided by a pianist. The Bandstand was built in 1912 by A.M. Bowman from a design prepared by members of the Elmira Musical Society. Located in Gore Park, it is a reminder of the centre of entertainment in a small town in the early 20th century. A brick post office opened in 1914 and its tower contained the town clock.

The village was incorporated as a town in 1923, within Waterloo County. At that time, the population was 2500.

In 1973, the town of Elmira ceased to exist under the amalgamation that also formed the Regional Municipality of Waterloo, replacing Waterloo County. Elmira became the administrative centre of Woolwich Township which increased in size at that time.

During the 1960s under contract with the U.S. government, Elmira's Uniroyal chemical plant (which changed its name to Crompton Company in 2001 and then to Chemtura in 2006) was one of seven manufacturers supplying the U.S. military with the toxic herbicide Agent Orange.

Due to the poor disposal practices of the toxic waste associated with the manufacture of Agent Orange and other chemicals, contamination has seeped down to the aquifer in and around Elmira. This contamination, NDMA (N-Nitrosodimethylamine), forced local water wells to close in 1990. Water is now delivered via a pipeline from Waterloo and other near local areas.

== Local information ==
The local schools include John Mahood Public School, Riverside Public School, St. Teresa RC, Park Manor Senior Public School, and Elmira District Secondary School. The secondary school draws students from the town and surrounding areas of St. Jacobs, Conestogo, Drayton, Winterbourne, Linwood, Heidelberg, West Montrose, Wallenstein, Yatton, Dorking and St. Clements.

The Elmira Library is a branch within the Region of Waterloo Library system. In 1911, the Elmira Library received a Carnegie grant after being supported by the local businesses for many years. It was expanded in 1978 to include a children's library and a meeting room. In 2008, an elevator was added to make the library accessible. In addition to WIFI, there are five public use internet stations in the library. Various programs are offered throughout the year, including children's programs.

== Woolwich Memorial Centre ==
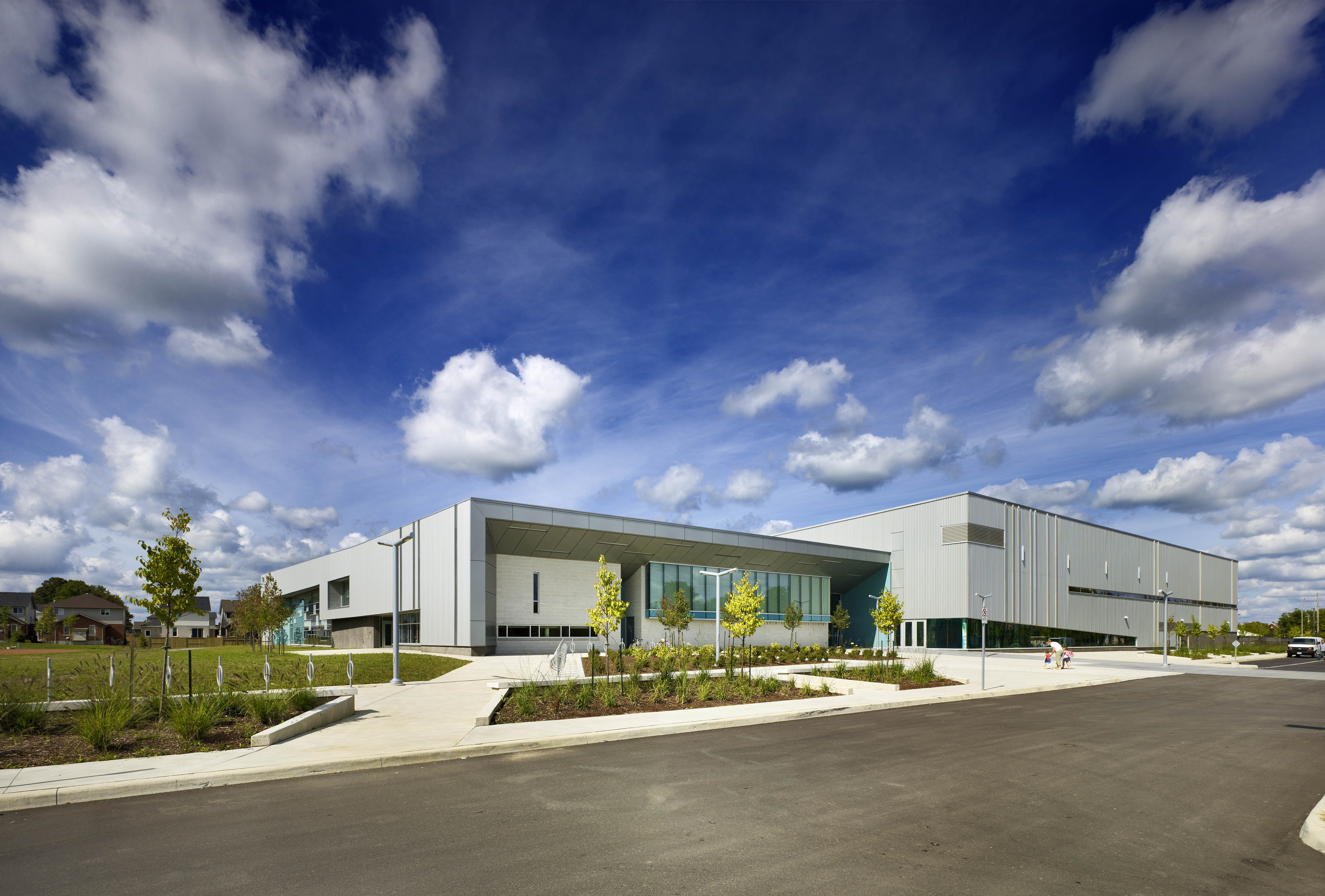
Woolwich Memorial Centre

The Woolwich Memorial Centre (WMC) is the Township of Woolwich's newest state-of-the-art facility comprising two NHL-sized ice surfaces, two pools, a fitness centre and walking track. The facility also includes a community centre, seniors centre, youth centre, Concourse Cafe, two meeting rooms and offices for minor sports teams.

== Economy ==
Elmira is the industrial centre of Woolwich Township. Major employers include Trylon TSF, Sanyo Machine Works, Elmira Pet Products, Lanxess, Toyota Boshoku formerly Trim Masters, Engineered Lifting Systems, and Southfield Windows & Doors. Since the 1970s, tourism has become an increasingly important industry in Elmira.

== Sports ==
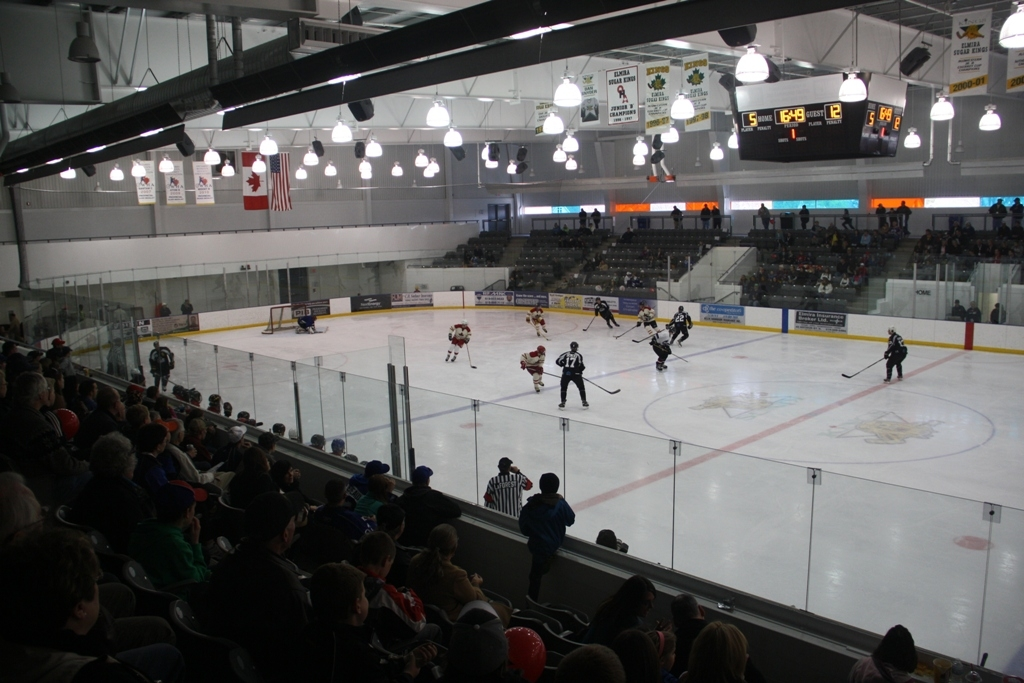
Hockey Arena

The local Jr. B Hockey team is the Elmira Sugar Kings, named after the very successful Elmira Maple Syrup Festival. Woolwich Township, where Elmira is located, was selected as a Top 5 finalist for the 2009 Kraft Hockeyville contest. Their 3rd-place finish earned them $25,000 in arena upgrades from Kraft Foods. The eventual winner was Terrace, British Columbia, which received an NHL preseason game, $100,000 for arena upgrades, and broadcast of CBC's Hockey Night in Canada.

Elmira has an active lawn bowling club. The Elmira Lawn Bowling Club is a member of District 7 of the Ontario Lawn Bowling Association.

== Transportation ==
Old Order Mennonites in buggies are a regular sight around the town.

Grand River Transit bus service was introduced to the town in April 2009 when the existing Route 21 to St. Jacobs, originating from Conestoga Mall in North Waterloo, was extended to Elmira. The days of service of the route were also increased from two days a week to six.

In 2018, Kiwanis Transit launched a free shuttle bus service throughout the town, designed as a feeder service to connect to the GRT Route 21. This six-month pilot service was extended for another six months, and in September 2019 regional transit planners proposed that it be transformed into a permanent Grand River Transit route.

The Waterloo Central Railway's tourist train also serves the town.

Elmira is an entry point for the Kissing Bridge Trailway, which runs between Guelph and Millbank. The Kissing Bridge Trailway is maintained by local community groups including the Elmira Lions Club, and is part of the larger G2G Rail Trail which stretches along the route of the former Guelph and Goderich Railway. It passes through a number of other small communities including Ariss, West Montrose, Wallenstein, and Linwood. The trail has a stone chip surface and is advertised as suitable for walking, cycling, running, cross-country skiing, and snowshoeing.

== Maple Syrup Festival ==
Each spring, since 1965, tens of thousands of people have gathered in Elmira, Ontario to celebrate the return of spring and maple syrup. Elmira Maple Syrup Festival is widely regarded as the World's largest Maple Syrup festival. In 2000, the Guinness Book of World Records designated the event as the largest single-day maple syrup festival in the world. A family event, the festival features: sugar bush tours; a half-mile long outdoor mall with vendors of local speciality food and crafts; a craft show; the Mayor's Maple Syrup contest; and of course the star of the day, pancakes and golden maple syrup.

Started as a way to promote the sticky spring delicacy, the syrup festival has always brought together volunteers from all parts of the community. The proceeds of their efforts go to support local charitable organizations.

== Notable people ==
=== Actors ===
- Lucas Bryant (1978 – ), known for his role of Nathan Wuornos in the TV series Haven

=== Artists ===
- Timothy Schmalz (1969 – ), sculptor best known for his Homeless Jesus that was installed at the University of Toronto in 2013

=== Athletes ===
- Derek Hahn (1977 – ), professional ice hockey player who won the Central Hockey League Most Valuable Player award in 2007
- Tyler Pasher (1994 – ), professional soccer player who was played for Sporting Kansas City and Houston Dynamo
- Ric Seiling (1957 – ), professional ice hockey player for the Buffalo Sabres and Detroit Red Wings
- Rod Seiling (1944 – ), professional ice hockey player for the Toronto Maple Leafs, New York Rangers, Washington Capitals, St. Louis Blues and Atlanta Flames
- Walter Sieber (1933–2009), professional wrestler best known as Waldo Von Erich
- Darryl Sittler (1950 – ), professional ice hockey player for the Toronto Maple Leafs, Philadelphia Flyers and Detroit Red Wings; elected into the Hockey Hall of Fame in 1989
- Dan Snyder (1978–2003), professional ice hockey player for the Atlanta Thrashers
- Cam Stewart (1971 – ), professional ice hockey player for the Boston Bruins, Florida Panthers and Minnesota Wild
- Dennis Wideman (1983 – ), professional ice hockey player for the St. Louis Blues, Boston Bruins, Florida Panthers, Washington Capitals and Calgary Flames
- Keith Woodall (1926–1981), ice hockey player who won the bronze medal for Canada at the 1956 Winter Olympics
- Jamie Wright (1976 – ), professional ice hockey player for the Dallas Stars, Calgary Flames and Philadelphia Flyers

=== Authors ===
- Isabel Huggan (1943 – ), writer of The Elizabeth Stories (1984)

=== Educators ===
- François Charles Archile Jeanneret (1890–1967), 22nd Chancellor of the University of Toronto from 1959 – 1965
- Carl Klinck (1908–1990), made an officer of the Order of Canada in 1973 and awarded the Royal Society of Canada's Lorne Pierce Medal in 1978

=== Journalists ===
- Malcolm Gladwell (1963 – ), staff writer for The New Yorker since 1996 and appointed to the Order of Canada in 2011
- Bruce Headlam (???? – ), media desk editor of The New York Times since 2008

=== Musicians ===
- Augustus Stephen Vogt (1861–1926), founded the Toronto Mendelssohn Choir in 1894 and was the musical director of the Toronto Conservatory of Music in 1913

=== Politicians ===
- Frederick John Mitchell (1893–1979), 25th Mayor of Edmonton in 1959
- Oscar Weichel (1894–1968), member of the House of Commons of Canada from 1958 – 1965
- William George Weichel (1870–1949), member of the House of Commons of Canada from 1911 – 1917 and the Legislative Assembly of Ontario from 1923 – 1929
- Conrad Weidenhammer (1866–1919), member of the Legislative Assembly of Alberta from 1913 – 1917

=== Producers ===
- J. J. Johnson (???? – ), creator of children's television series such as This is Daniel Cook, Dino Dana and Endlings

=== Religion ===
- Addie Aylestock (1909–1998), first woman minister ordained in the British Methodist Episcopal Church and first black woman to be ordained in Canada

== See also ==
- List of population centres in Ontario
- List of unincorporated communities in Ontario
