= Norman Schneider =

Canadian politician and businessman

Member of Parliament for Waterloo North
- In office 1952–1958
- Preceded by: Louis Orville Breithaupt
- Succeeded by: Oscar William Weichel

Personal details
- Born: Norman C. Schneider; 9 December 1888 Kitchener, Ontario
- Died: 26 August 1985 (aged 96) Kitchener, Ontario
- Party: Liberal
- Profession: food industry

Norman Christoph Schneider (9 December 1888 – 26 August 1985) was a Canadian politician and businessman.

Born in Kitchener, Ontario, Norman Schneider was the son of John Metz Schneider, the founder of Schneider Foods, now a division of Maple Leaf Foods. He joined the family business in 1911 eventually becoming vice-president, president and chairman of the board before retiring in 1970.

In a 1952 by-election, he was elected to the House of Commons of Canada as Liberal candidate for the Ontario riding of Waterloo North. He was re-elected in 1953, beating out Progressive Conservation candidate Elizabeth Janzen. Schneider was elected again in 1957, but was defeated in 1958, marking the end of his political career.

Schneider was an aviation enthusiast and played an active role in the development of the Kitchener-Waterloo airport that opened in 1930 and the Waterloo-Wellington airport that opened in 1950.

He died in his home in Kitchener in 1985.

Parliament of Canada
Preceded by Louis Orville Breithaupt	Member of Parliament for Waterloo North; 1952–1958	Succeeded by Oscar Weichel
