= John Metz Schneider =

Canadian businessman (1859–1942)

- Born: February 17, 1859; Berlin, Canada West
- Died: February 23, 1942 (aged 83); Kitchener, Ontario
- Citizenship: Canadian
- Known for: Schneider Foods

John Metz (J.M.) Schneider (February 17, 1859 in Berlin, Canada West – February 23, 1942 in Kitchener, Ontario) was a Canadian businessman and founder of Schneider Foods, now a division of Maple Leaf Foods.

== Early life ==
Schneider was born in Berlin, Canada West on February 17, 1859, to Johann Christoph and Anna Elizabeth (née Metz). His father immigrated to Canada from Baden, Germany, as a child. He married Helena Ahrens November 8, 1883, and together they had five children: Charles Alexander (1884-1945), Herbert John (1886-1905), Norman Christoph (1888-1985), Frederick Henry (1890-1967) and Emma Louise (1894-1952).

== Career ==
Schneider began working as soon as he was of age. He founded what would become Schneider Foods in 1886 after injuring his hand on the job at the Dominion Button Works factory. Unable to work, he and his wife, Helena, began making sausages and selling them door-to-door, which they kept up after he was able to return to work. The recipe was based on one his mother used for pork sausage. He later expanded operation into a butchering service and retail store next to his home on Courtland Avenue in Kitchener. Built in the 1890s, it was constructed to look like a home in case the business failed. The company grew and survived the Great Depression, becoming one of the largest meat producers in Canada. It specialized in wieners, luncheon meat, sausage and other forms of specialty and delicatessen meats, and was the first company in Canada to introduce vacuum packaging. The company was incorporated as J.M. Schneider and Sons, Limited in 1925.

Schneider was active in municipal politics, sitting on the board of trade for more than 40 years and serving as city alderman from 1905 to 1907. He was also a long-time member of the Swedenborgian Church and played a significant role in the building of the Church of the Good Shepherd in Kitchener.

== Death ==
Schneider died February 23, 1942, at his home in Kitchener following several weeks of poor health. An estimated 1,000 people attended a memorial service held at the Church of the Good Shepherd in his honour. His remains were entombed at the Woodland Cemetery Mausoleum.
