= Peter Lang (politician) =

Canadian politician (born 1950)

Member of Parliament for Kitchener
- In office 1980–1984
- Preceded by: John Reimer
- Succeeded by: John Reimer

Personal details
- Born: Peter Joseph Lang; 19 November 1950 (age 75) Kitchener, Ontario, Canada
- Party: Liberal
- Profession: Coroner, physician, psychiatrist

Peter Joseph Lang (born 19 November 1950) is a Canadian politician and former Liberal party member of the House of Commons of Canada. He was a physician, psychiatrist and coroner by career.

Born in Kitchener, Ontario, Lang was elected to Ontario's Kitchener riding in the 1980 federal election and served in the 32nd Canadian Parliament. He was defeated in the 1984 election by John Reimer of the Progressive Conservative party.
