= CanWaCH =

Canadian women's health organization

- Canadian Partnership for Women and Children’s Health
- Formation: 2010
- Founder: Helen Scott and Julia Anderson
- Headquarters: Peterborough
- Members: 94
- CEO: Julia Anderson
- Board of directors: Onome Ako (chair), Margaret Biggs, Sian Fitzgerald, Mark Brender, William B. Chambers, Chris Dendys, Timothy Grant Evans, Lindsay Glassco, Danny Glenwright, Barbara Grantham, Jocelyn Mackie, Rowena Pinto, Eva Slawecki
- Staff: 13
- Website: canwach.ca

The Canadian Partnership for Women and Children's Health, most commonly known as CanWaCH, is an umbrella not for profit organization that unites Canadian organizations working on women and child's health. It has a focus on reproductive health.

== History ==
CanWaCH was co-founded by epidemiologist Helen Scott and international development practitioner Julia Anderson in 2010, simultaneous to the 36th G8 summit occurring in Canada. The board of directors is chaired by Onome Ako.

The organization was officially incorporated as a not for profit in 2015 in Peterborough, Ontario.

== Organization ==
As of 2018, CanWaCH had 94 members and 13 employees.

Activities are funded by the Government of Canada.

== Activities ==
In 2017, CanWaCH held the Global Adolescent Health conference which facilitated the launch of the World Health Organization's report Global Accelerated Action for the Health of Adolescents. The meeting was a forum for stakeholders, including youth representatives, to discuss challenges and opportunities to improve youth health.

In 2018, CanWaCH launched the Canadian Collaborative in Global Health initiative to improve collaboration between Canadian global health organizations working towards the Sustainable Development Goals.

In 2021, CanWaCH collaborated with the Canadian International Council and Global Canada on a 400-person collaborative democratic process called Foreign Policy by Canadians. The participants discussed issues including gender equity, social justice, the environment, Indigenous rights, and the environment. The process concluded that Canadians felt that Canada was not doing enough to improve women and children's health within its own borders.

Other activities include providing commentary on federal government spending.
