= Elmira Maple Syrup Festival =

Annual festival held in Elmira, Ontario, Canada

Coordinates: 43.5958°N 80.5608°W

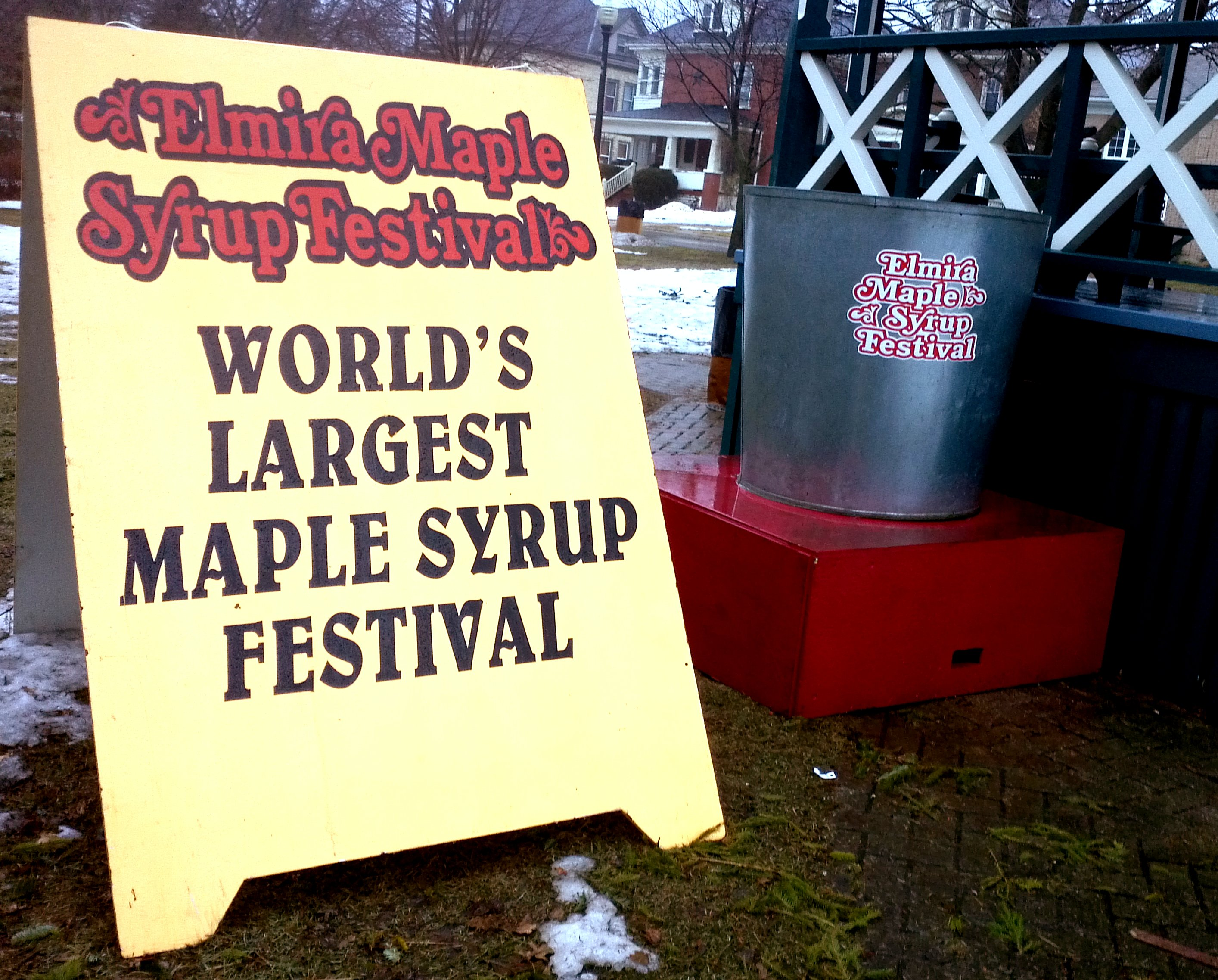
Promotional sign for the 2014 Elmira Maple Syrup Festival

The Elmira Maple Syrup Festival is an annual festival held in Elmira, Ontario, Canada.

== History ==
The yearly festival began on April 10, 1965. Organizers anticipated 2,500 attendees, but instead it drew a crowd of 10,000 visitors, thus ensuring its continuation. It continued to grow as an annual tradition in subsequent years, peaking in popularity with 66,529 visitors in 2000, making it the world's largest single day maple syrup festival according to the Guinness Book of World Records. Volunteers from the Canadian Automobile Association counted people entering Elmira by car that year. The festival says it attracts visitors from around the world, including Australia, Europe, Mexico, the United States, and the rest of Canada.

Also in 2000, the Festival served its 500,000th pancake. Pancakes, apple fritters, homemade toffee (weather permitting), log sawing competitions, arts and crafts (notably quilts made by local Mennonites), sugar bush tours by tractor wagon and other attractions are among the festivities. Large quantities of maple syrup is also sold. The town's main street, Arthur Street, is closed to automobile traffic for the day, where vendors set up booths to sell souvenirs and other items. It is organized by a board and run by approximately 2,000 volunteers each year.

In 2026, the festival had 82,000 attendees.

== Charity ==
Since the very first edition, all proceeds from the Elmira Maple Syrup Festival were returned to the community, to both charitable and not-for-profit organizations. In 2001, the Festival received the Outstanding Philanthropic Action award from the Foundation for Rural Living. Traditionally, 40 percent of the profits are allocated annually to the Elmira District Community Living, a local charity that helps people with intellectual disabilities to participate in the community, with the remaining amounts shared among selected organizations.
