= John English (Canadian politician) =

Canadian politician

John English OC OOnt FRSC

Member of Parliament for Kitchener
- In office January 17, 1994 – April 27, 1997
- Preceded by: John Reimer
- Succeeded by: Constituency abolished

Personal details
- Born: John Richard English; January 26, 1945 (age 81) Plattsville, Ontario, Canada
- Party: Liberal
- Education: University of Waterloo (BA); Harvard University (AM, PhD)

John Richard English OC OOnt FRSC (born January 26, 1945) is a Canadian academic and former politician.

== Career ==
A native of Plattsville, Ontario, he received a Bachelor of Arts degree in 1967 from the University of Waterloo. He completed his A.M. (Master's) degree in 1968 and PhD in 1973 at Harvard University. He joined the University of Waterloo as a lecturer in history in 1972, becoming an assistant professor in 1974, an associate professor in 1978, and a professor in 1984. He received a D.Litt. (hon) from Wilfrid Laurier University in 1990.

He served as a Liberal Member of Parliament for Kitchener between 1993 and 1997.

Subsequently, he served as a special ambassador for landmines and as a special envoy for the election of Canada to the United Nations Security Council.

He has also served as president of the Canadian Institute of International Affairs, co-editor of the Canadian Historical Review, chair of the board of the Canadian Museum of Civilization and the Canadian War Museum, and was the executive director of the Centre for International Governance Innovation, Canada's largest think tank devoted exclusively to the study of international affairs.

He is currently chair of the Canadian International Council, the advisory board chair of the Trudeau Centre for Peace, Conflict and Justice at the Munk School of Global Affairs and Public Policy, and chair of Members of the Pierre Elliott Trudeau Foundation.

He served as distinguished visiting professor at the Canadian Forces College in 2010-11, is distinguished university professor emeritus at the University of Waterloo, and is a Fellow of Trinity College and of Massey College at the University of Toronto. He was the general editor of the Dictionary of Canadian Biography and the founding director of the Bill Graham Centre for Contemporary International History at the University of Toronto.

English has written many books and articles, and was the official biographer of former Canadian prime minister Lester Pearson; this work was published in two volumes. At the request of the Trudeau family, he wrote the biography of Pierre Trudeau. In October 2006, the first volume, Citizen of the World: The Life of Pierre Elliott Trudeau, Volume One: 1919–1968 (ISBN 0-676-97521-6), was published. The second volume, entitled Just Watch Me: The Life of Pierre Elliott Trudeau Vol. 2 1968–2000, was published in October 2009. His most recent book is "Ice and Water: Politics, Peoples, and the Arctic Council," for which he won the John Lyman Book Award for maritime history.

He is an Officer of the Order of Canada, a Fellow of the Royal Society of Canada, Honorary Senior Fellow of Renison University College, member of numerous editorial boards, and a recipient of many literary awards.

He has won the John A. Macdonald Prize of the Canadian Historical Association, the Canadian Authors Association Non-Fiction Prize, the University of British Columbia Biography Prize, and twice-won the Dafoe Prize. Citizen of the World: The Life of Pierre Elliott Trudeau, Volume One was shortlisted for the Charles Taylor Prize for literary non-fiction in February 2007, and in January 2010, Just Watch Me: The Life of Pierre Elliott Trudeau, Volume Two received the same honour. Volume One was also chosen as a Best Book of the Decade by Chapters. Both volumes were also short-listed for the Governor-General's Non-Fiction Prize. Volume Two won the 2009 Shaughnessy Cohen Prize for Political Writing. He is the recipient of the Cross of the Order of Merit of the Federal Republic of Germany.

On June 30, 2016, English was promoted to an Officer of the Order of Canada from member by Governor General David Johnston for "his contributions as a historian, author and administrator who has expanded our knowledge and understanding of Canada's rich political heritage."

He was named to the Order of Ontario in 2024.

== Selected bibliography ==
John English appears on Bookbits radio to talk about Just Watch Me.

- The Decline of Politics: The Conservatives and the Party System, 1901–20 (1977)
- Arthur Meighen (1977)
- Robert Borden, His Life and World (1977)
- Mackenzie King: Widening the Debate (1977), editor with J. O. Stubbs
- Kitchener: An Illustrated History (1983), with Kenneth McLaughlin
- Years of Growth (1986)
- The Life of Lester B. Pearson

- Volume I: Shadow of Heaven, 1897–1948 (1989)
- Volume II: The Worldly Years, 1949–1972 (1993)

- Mackenzie King: Citizenship and Community: Essays Marking the 125th Anniversary of the Birth of William Lyon Mackenzie King (2002), editor with Kenneth McLaughlin and P. Whitney Lackenbauer
- The Life of Pierre Elliott Trudeau

- Volume I: Citizen of the World, 1919–1968 (2006)
- Volume II: Just Watch Me, 1968–2000 (2009)

- Ice and Water: Politics, Peoples, and the Arctic Council (2013)

== See also ==
- List of University of Waterloo people

Parliament of Canada
Preceded by John Reimer (Progressive Conservative)	Member of Parliament for Kitchener; 1993-1997	Succeeded by district renamed to Kitchener Centre and Waterloo—Wellington
