= William Daum Euler =

Canadian politician

The Honourable William Daum Euler
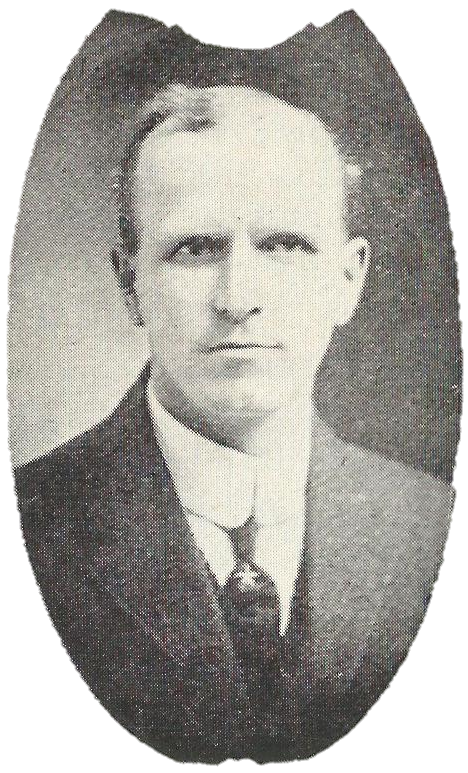
- Euler, 1912

Member of Parliament for Waterloo North
- In office 1917–1940
- Preceded by: William George Weichel
- Succeeded by: Louis Orville Breithaupt

Canadian Senator from Ontario
- In office 1940–1961
- Appointed by: William Lyon Mackenzie King

Personal details
- Born: July 10, 1875 Conestogo, Ontario, Canada
- Died: July 15, 1961 (aged 86) Kitchener, Ontario, Canada
- Party: Liberal
- Cabinet: Minister of Customs and Excise (1926–1927); Minister of National Revenue (1927–1930); Minister of Trade and Commerce (1935–1940)

William Daum Euler, PC (July 10, 1875 – July 15, 1961) was a Canadian parliamentarian.

== Background ==
Euler was born in Conestogo, Ontario, the son of Henry Euler and Catherine Daum. He attended Berlin High School between the years of 1891 and 1893. He then taught in Suddaby Public School and later founded the Euler Business College. Euler married Jean Howd. He was mayor of Berlin, Ontario (now Kitchener) from 1914 to 1917. He was first elected to the House of Commons of Canada in 1917 representing the riding of Waterloo North, Ontario. A Liberal, he held three cabinet positions: Minister of Customs and Excise (1926 to 1927), Minister of National Revenue (1927 to 1930), and Minister of Trade and Commerce (1935 to 1940). He served until 1940, when he was appointed to the Senate representing the senatorial division of Waterloo, Ontario. He died in office in 1961 in Kitchener.

As Senator, he waged the campaign to eliminate the ban on margarine in Canada.

In 1961 he became the first Chancellor of Waterloo Lutheran University (now Wilfrid Laurier University).

There is a Willam Daum Euler fonds at Library and Archives Canada.

Political offices
Preceded by Richard Burpee Hanson	Minister of Trade and Commerce; 1935–1940	Succeeded by James Angus MacKinnon
Academic offices
Preceded by None	Chancellor of Waterloo Lutheran University; 1961	Succeeded by W. Ross Macdonald
