= Ray Lawson =

Canadian politician (1886-1980)

The Honourable Ray Lawson OBE
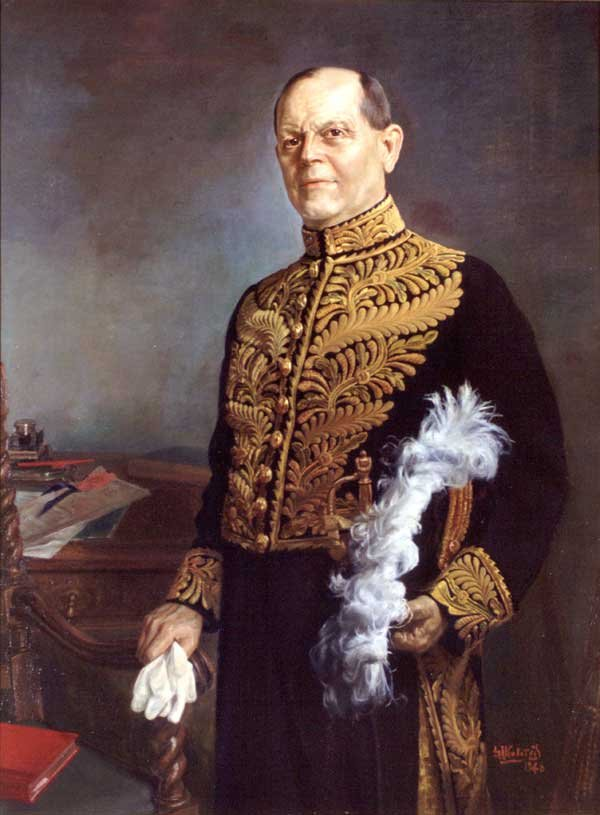
- Portrait, 1948

17th Lieutenant Governor of Ontario
- In office December 26, 1946 – February 18, 1952
- Monarchs: George VI; Elizabeth II
- Governors General: The Viscount Alexander of Tunis; Vincent Massey
- Premier: George A. Drew; Thomas Laird Kennedy; Leslie Frost
- Preceded by: Albert Edward Matthews
- Succeeded by: Louis Orville Breithaupt

Personal details
- Born: Frank Ray Lawson; August 30, 1886 London, Ontario
- Died: April 4, 1980 (aged 93) London, Ontario, Canada
- Spouse: Helen Newton (m. 1909)
- Children: 5
- Profession: Businessman

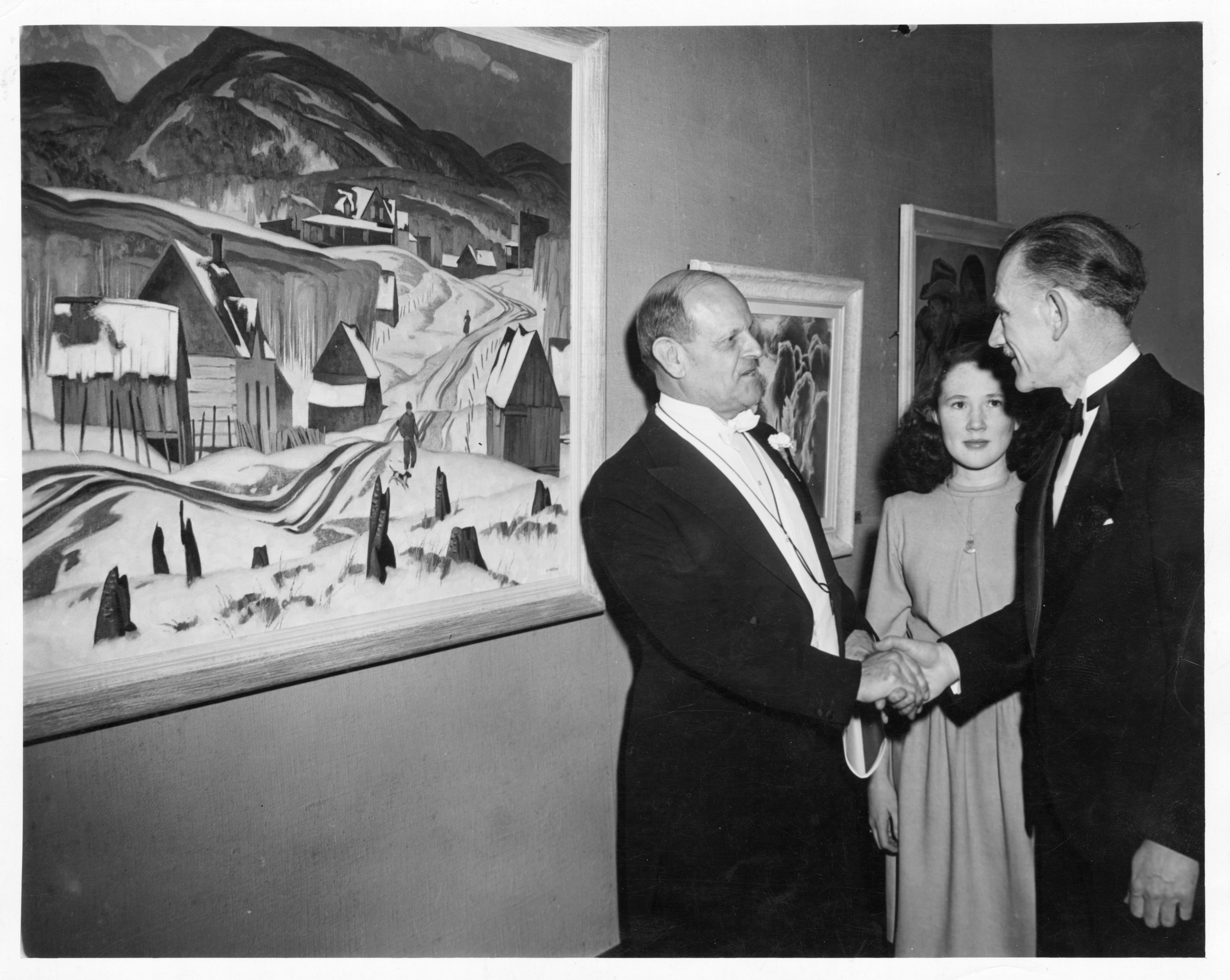
Lieutenant Governor Ray Lawson with A. J. Casson and Casson's daughter, Margaret, at the Ontario Society of Artists' 75th Annual Art Exhibition, Toronto, 1947

Frank Ray Lawson OBE (August 30, 1886 – April 4, 1980), was the 17th Lieutenant Governor of Ontario, Canada, from 1946 to 1952.

Born in London, Ontario, he was the son of Francis Edgar ("Frank") Lawson, a former newspaper reporter, and Lorena Hodgins, a former teacher. He studied at London Collegiate and attended Woodstock College in 1902, but left after less than a year, eager to begin a business career. At age 17, he began working as a clerk in a London dry goods business, and later worked as a traveling salesman for a wholesale jeweler, before becoming a traveling salesman for Lawson & Jones Limited, the printing firm co-founded by his father. In 1909 he married Helen Newton and they later had five children.

In 1911, following the sudden death of his father, Lawson returned to London and assumed his father's position with Lawson & Jones. In 1913, he borrowed heavily to purchase the shares held by the Jones family and, at the age of 26, became the company's president, director and major shareholder. In addition to printing druggists' labels and calendars, in 1916 Lawson & Jones entered into a profitable arrangement to manufacture cigarette packaging for Imperial Tobacco. By 1920, Lawson had retired the debt he incurred and throughout the depression the company grew by acquiring and consolidating other printing concerns.

When war broke out in 1939, Lawson went to work for C.D. Howe, Canadian Federal Minister of Munitions and Supply, as a "dollar-a-year-man", and was appointed president of Federal Aircraft Limited, a crown corporation established in Montreal to manufacture the Avro Anson trainer for the British Commonwealth Air Training Plan. He was named an Officer of the Order of the British empire in 1942.

During his career, Lawson was a senior executive or director of 20 Canadian companies, including: president, Lawson & Jones Ltd., president, Canadian Containers; president, Midland Securities, Ltd.; vice-president and director, The Royal Bank of Canada; director, Traders Finance Corporation Limited; director, London & Western Trust Co. Ltd.; vice-president and director, Canada Trust Company Ltd.; director, Huron & Erie Loan and Savings Company; director, Northern Life Assurance Co. of Canada; director, Toronto General Insurance; director, Great Lakes Paper. Eight universities conferred honorary degrees on him.

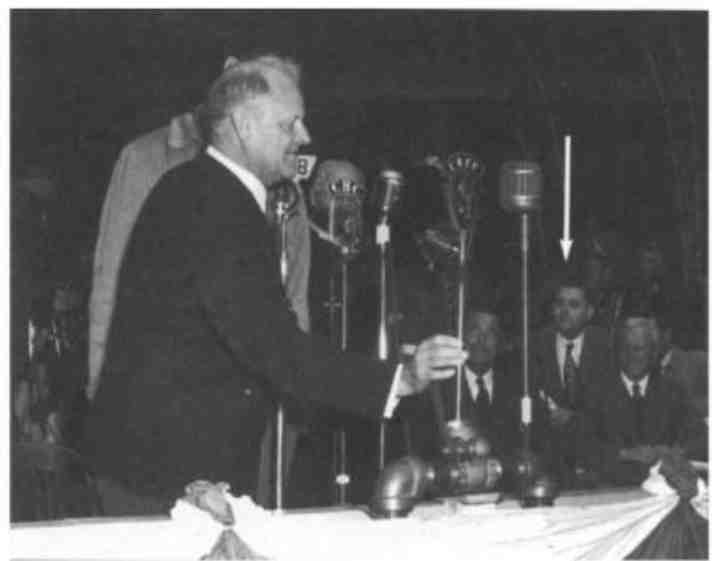
Lawson presided over the launch of the first Pile for the Toronto Transit Commission's Yonge Subway line.

Ray Lawson was Lieutenant Governor of Ontario from 1946 to 1952. He was later Canadian Consul-General in New York City from 1953 to 1955. From 1948 to 1956, he was the Chancellor of University of King's College, Halifax, Nova Scotia.

In 1947, Lawson purchased the Oakville lakeshore estate, “Ballymena” that was previously owned by William Fletcher Eaton, to have a suitable residence close to Toronto and for use in his capacity as Lieutenant Governor. It became his permanent home.

Lawson was an active philanthropist most of his life, having sponsored the building of a library at the University of Western Ontario as early as 1933, and over the years creating various scholarships, trusts and contributing to charitable societies. In 1956, he established the Lawson Foundation, with assets of $2,000,000. The Foundation has since donated over $50 million to charities across Canada and in 2005 had an endowment of over $90 million.

Ray Lawson died in 1980 and was buried at Woodland Cemetery, London, Ontario.

His descendants currently reside all over the world, including Australia, Japan and South Africa. They continue to participate in and volunteer with the Lawson Foundation.

Has a street and public elementary school named after him in Brampton, ON and a street in Montreal, QC (Anjou borough).

Government offices
Preceded by Albert Edward Matthews	Lieutenant Governor of Ontario; 1946–1952	Succeeded by Louis Orville Breithaupt
