= Couchiching Institute on Public Affairs =

Canadian organization

The Couchiching Institute on Public Affairs (CIPA) is Canada's oldest organization devoted to studying and publicizing current issues affecting Canada and public policy. Founded in 1932, it holds an annual conference every August on the shores of Lake Couchiching and smaller events during the year, in Toronto and other major cities. In 2019, the Couchiching Institute on Public Affairs was merged into the Canadian International Council, and continues as an annual Couchiching event which the CIC hosts.

== Mission ==
The mission of the CIPA is to increase the awareness and understanding of domestic and international issues amongst people in Canada, through open and inclusive discussion, without advocacy or partisanship.

== History ==
Over the years, the issues examined at the Couchiching conference have reflected the changing concerns of Canadian society and the world. During the Great Depression, topics focused on social reform, the state of the economy and the growing threat of war in Europe. In the late 1940s and 1950s, participants discussed issues such as rebuilding the post-war world, the Cold War and the challenges of world peace. More recently, conference topics have turned to such issues as technology, the environment, the problem of illiteracy, the economic challenges facing today's youth and globalization in various contexts.

Over the years CIPA has offered as speakers and attracted as participants current and future leaders in politics, education, science, the arts and the rest of civil society. In the past decade, speakers have included Tariq Ramadan, Will Kymlicka, Haroon Siddiqui, Kevin G. Lynch, Sheela Basrur, John Ralston Saul, Alan Borovoy, Lewis Mackenzie Jennifer Stoddart, Gerri Sinclair, Karen Armstrong, Mobina Jaffer, Michael Wilson (politician), Bill Graham, Lloyd Axworthy, Andres Rozental, Anne Golden, Barbara Hall, Roger Obonsawin, Sylvia Ostry, Pierre Pettigrew, Moses Znaimer, Sir Michael Marmot, Dr. Fraser Mustard, Sir John Maddox, John Polanyi, Bartha Knoppers and Margaret Somerville.

Speakers in earlier decades included John Kenneth Galbraith, Henry Kissinger, Marshall McLuhan, Denys Arcand, Pierre-Marc Johnson and Bernard Crick. Former or future Prime Ministers of Canada have featured at the conference too: John Diefenbaker, Lester B. Pearson, Pierre Elliot Trudeau, Joe Clark, Kim Campbell and Paul Martin.

== Annual conferences ==
The annual conference, which is open to the public, draws about 250 participants from all walks of life and from 18 to past 80 who are interested in the current topic or in public affairs generally. The usual format involves about three days (Thursday evening through Sunday afternoon) of speeches, panels and debates, with ample opportunity for questions from the floor in all cases, together with formal and informal discussion groups. The lakeside setting encourages casual contact and one-on-one conversations among speakers and participants. Most participants, including many speakers, stay on-site for the duration of the conference.

The conference usually draws media coverage, both print and broadcast, including some video on CPAC.

== Round-Table meetings ==
The Round-Table meetings held from time to time between annual conferences usually occupy an evening session with one or more resource-speakers and about thirty participants. They may deal with aspects of the topic of the forthcoming annual conference or an unrelated matter. In recent years such events have been held in Ottawa, Montreal and Vancouver as well as in Toronto. A list of topics and (since 2009) podcasts of the speakers' portion of the events, but not the discussion, are found at the Couchiching web site.

== Organization ==
CIPA was a registered charitable organization run by a board of directors and committees of volunteers, supported by Zzeem, Inc. Association Management of Toronto. In 2019, the Couchiching Institute on Public Affairs was merged into the Canadian International Council, and continues as an annual Couchiching event which the CIC hosts. Former board members of the Couchiching Institute continue to advise the CIC on these events.
