= Isaac Erb Bowman =

Canadian politician and businessman (1832–1897)

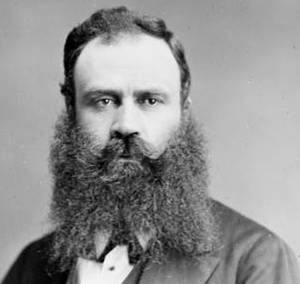
- Bowman in 1874.

Member of Parliament for Waterloo North
- In office 1867–1878
- Succeeded by: Hugo Kranz
- In office 1887–1896
- Preceded by: Hugo Kranz
- Succeeded by: Joseph E. Seagram

Personal details
- Born: Isaac Erb Baumann; 17 August 1832 Woolwich Township, Upper Canada
- Died: 3 September 1897 (aged 65) Waterloo, Ontario
- Party: Liberal
- Spouse: Lydia Bowman (m. 1861)
- Children: Charles Martin Bowman
- Parents: John B. Bauman (father); Lydia Erb (mother)
- Occupation: Businessman

Isaac Erb Bowman (17 August 1832 – 3 September 1897) was an Ontario businessman and political figure. He represented Waterloo North in the House of Commons of Canada as a Liberal member from 1867 to 1878 and from 1887 to 1896.

He was born Isaac Erb Baumann in Woolwich Township in Upper Canada in 1832, the son of John B. Bowman; his parents had moved there from Pennsylvania in 1820. He attended school at the Rockwood Academy in Rockwood, Ontario. For a time, he taught school in the region. Bowman was a partner in a business that sold books in Berlin (later known as Kitchener) and in a tannery in St. Jacobs. He served as clerk and treasurer for the township and was also postmaster for St. Jacobs. He served as president of the Ontario Mutual Life Insurance Company and the Mercantile Fire Insurance Company. He was elected to the Legislative Assembly of the Province of Canada in an 1864 by-election for the North riding of Waterloo and he was acclaimed in the same riding after Confederation. He was defeated by Hugo Kranz when he ran for reelection in 1878; Bowman defeated Kranz to win the seat in 1887 and 1891.

Bowman married Lydia Bowman. He died at Waterloo on 3 September 1897. He is buried at the Calvary United Brethren Cemetery in St. Jacobs.

His son Charles Martin Bowman later became a member of the Legislative Assembly of Ontario.

Parliament of Canada
Preceded by pre-Confederation office	Member of Parliament for Waterloo North; 1867–1878	Succeeded by Hugo Kranz
Preceded by Hugo Kranz	Member of Parliament for Waterloo North; 1887–1896	Succeeded by Joseph E. Seagram
