= Louis Jacob Breithaupt =

Canadian politician (1855 – 1939)

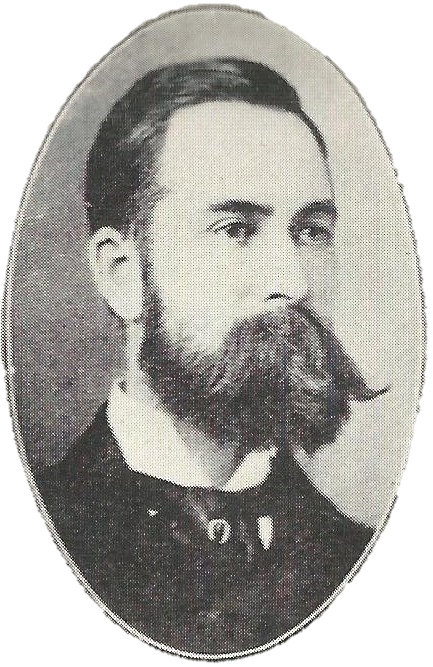
- L. J. Breithaupt, 1912

Member of the Ontario Provincial Parliament for Waterloo North
- In office 1899–1902
- Preceded by: Henry George Lackner
- Succeeded by: Henry George Lackner

Warden of Waterloo County
- In office 1898

Mayor of Berlin, Ontario
- In office 1888–1889
- Preceded by: Henry George Lackner
- Succeeded by: Henry L. Janzen

Personal details
- Born: 3 March 1855 Buffalo, New York
- Died: 6 March 1939 (aged 84) Saint Petersburg, Florida
- Party: Liberal Party
- Spouse: Emma Alvarena Devitt
- Children: Louis Orville Breithaupt; Rosa Breithaupt Hewetson Clark
- Parent: Louis Breithaupt (father)
- Occupation: Businessman

Louis Jacob Breithaupt (3 March 1855 – 6 March 1939) was an American-Canadian manufacturer and politician in Ontario, Canada. He represented Waterloo North in the Legislative Assembly of Ontario from 1899 to 1902 as a Liberal member.

== Biography ==
Louis Jacob Breithaupt was born on 3 March 1855, in Buffalo, New York, the son of Catharine Hailer and Philip Ludwig "Louis" Breithaupt. Louis Jacob moved to Berlin, Canada West (later renamed Kitchener) with his family in 1857 and was mayor of Berlin himself from 1888 to 1889. In 1881, he married Emma Alvarene Devitt, the daughter of Benjamin Devitt, then mayor of Waterloo, Ontario. Breithaupt was manager of the Breithaupt Leather Company, president of the Berlin Gas Company and was also associated with other manufacturing businesses. He served as president of the Board of Trade in 1891.

His brother John Christian was mayor of Berlin in 1896 to 1897 and his brother Ezra Carl also served on the Berlin Board of Trade. His son Louis Orville later served as mayor of the city of Kitchener, a member of the House of Commons and Lieutenant-Governor for Ontario. His daughter Rosa founded the Guild of All Arts artist colony in Scarborough, Ontario, now the Guild Park and Gardens. Rosa is also the great-grandmother of Canadian actors Stephen Amell and Robbie Amell.

While wintering in Florida, Breithaupt died on 6 March 1939, at the age of 84 after contracting bronchial pneumonia following a fall and fractured arm. His gravestone is at Mount Hope Cemetery in Kitchener.
