= Official function =

Type of event

An official function is either an event, such as a convention, that has an official purpose for one's employment, vocation or profession-whether run by a person, institution or governmental agency-or an official duty.

Attending events with official purposes is one of the duties of many persons in many organizations. Attending such events fall into categories of networking, protocol, information gathering, among others. Networking may involve an economic network, an entrepreneurial network, an old boy network, a social network, and a value network. Protocol deals with etiquette and other forms of intercultural competence that should be followed to show respect for those with whom one is networking. Information may be gained as a message, a pattern, or an input.

Attending events with official purposes helps one build an augmented social network, a community of practice, and a network of practice. Such attendance increases occupational competence and achievement.

Official duties are those performed to facilitate the achievement of one's assignments as an employee. They may include duties that are performed in a routine manner and duties whose performance demonstrates innovation and leadership. They may include duties that are commonly performed, and duties that must be performed because of new circumstances.

== Books ==
- Diane Darling, THE NETWORKING SURVIVAL GUIDE: GET THE SUCCESS YOU WANT BY TAPPING THE PEOPLE YOU KNOW (2003)
- Paul Hildreth; Chris Kimble (2004). Knowledge Networks: Innovation through Communities of Practice. Hershey: IGI Global. ISBN 978-1-59140-200-8. OCLC 54448243. OL 8854707M. Wikidata Q104813481.
- Harvey Mackay, DIG YOUR WELL BEFORE YOU'RE THIRSTY: THE ONLY NETWORKING BOOK YOU'LL EVER NEED (1999)
- Wenger, Etienne (1998), Communities of Practice: Learning, Meaning, and Identity, Cambridge: Cambridge University Press, ISBN 978-0-521-66363-2
- Etienne Wenger, Richard McDermott, and William M. Snyder, CREATING COMMUNITIES OF PRACTICE (2002)
