= Stanton Lautenschlager =

American missionary (1888–1950)

- Born: 4 April 1888; Waterloo, Ontario, Canada
- Died: 7 June 1950 (aged 62); Wayne, Ohio, US
- Occupation: Missionary

Stanton Lautenschlager (April 4, 1888 – June 7, 1950) was a Canadian-American missionary, pastor and clergyman.

== Personal life ==
He was born on April 4, 1888, in Waterloo, Ontario, Canada. His father, Isaac Lautenschlager, was 22 years old and his mother, Mary Ann Schweitzer, was 23 years old when he was born.

He immigrated to Detroit, Michigan in 1945 and lived in Huntington, Indiana until 1920 and Madisonburg, Wooster, and Wayne, Ohio until 1950.

He was married to Sarah Herner Lautenschlager with whom he had a son, Robert and a daughter, Kathleen.

He died on 7 June 1950 in Wayne, Ohio.

== Education ==
He was educated at the Kitchener and Waterloo Collegiate Institute, Huntington Independent College and the University of Michigan.

He received his Master of Arts degree at the University of Michigan in 1919.

== Career ==
He served as a Pastor at Alma St. United Brethren, Church.

From 1914 till 1919, he served as a missionary in China.

He taught five years in a Chinese Christian High School and 15 years in Cheeloo University and Lingnan University.

=== Evangelism and missionary work ===
During the Japanese occupation of China, he was especially active in evangelistic work. In 1936 he toured the Christian schools of south and central China. He preached the Christian doctrine to thousands and used all possible means of transportation including horse and foot.

== Awards and honours ==
He has received the Mayor Hett Medal for elocution and the William Lyon Mackenzie King Medal for public speaking.

== Bibliography ==
He wrote "Far Western China," and the chapters on students and Christianity in "China Discovers Her West," as well as many magazine articles.

He most notable work is Far West in China which is now available online.

== See also ==
- Protestant missions in China
- Walter Henry Medhurst
