= Oscar Weichel =

Canadian politician (1894–1968)

Oscar William Weichel

Member of Parliament for Waterloo North
- In office March 1958 – September 1965

Personal details
- Born: 26 January 1894 Elmira, Ontario, Canada
- Died: March 1, 1968 (aged 74)
- Party: Progressive Conservative
- Profession: journalist, postmaster

Oscar William "Mike" Weichel (26 January 1894 – 1 March 1968) was a Progressive Conservative party member of the House of Commons of Canada. He was born in Elmira, Ontario and became a journalist and postmaster by career.

The son of John S. Weichel and Ida Rappel, he was educated in Elmira, Kitchener and at the Toronto Business College. Weichel was a talented sportsman in hockey and baseball and was within reach of a professional career. However, during military service in World War I, one of Weichel's legs was destroyed thereby ending his future prospects in these sports. He then directed his attention to coaching and administrative work, including 20 years of service on the executive of the Ontario Minor Hockey Association.

Weichel worked as a journalist with the Kitchener-Waterloo Record. He was secretary for the Toronto Harbour Commission from 1920 to 1922 and served as postmaster for Elmira from 1922 to 1958. In 1923, he married Olive Elizabeth Hughes.

By the late 1950s, his interests turned to politics. Weichel won a House of Commons seat at the Waterloo North riding in the 1958 general election and was re-elected there in 1962 and 1963. After completing his final term, the 26th Canadian Parliament, Weichel left federal politics and did not seek re-election as of the 1965 federal election.

Parliament of Canada
Preceded by Norman Schneider	Member of Parliament for Waterloo North; 1958–1965	Succeeded by Kieth Hymmen
