= Hugo Kranz =

Canadian politician and businessman (1834-1902)

Hugo Carl Kranz
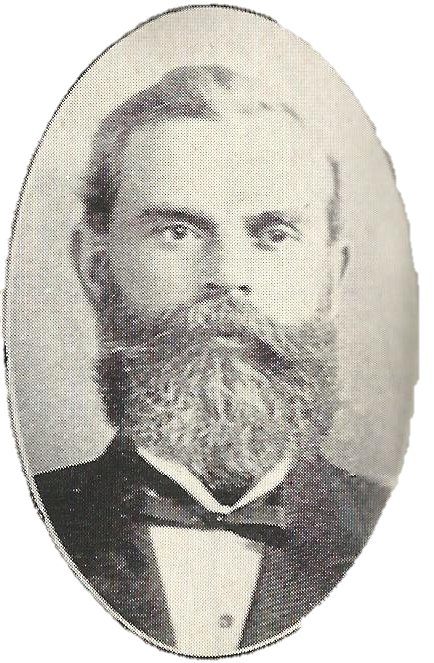
- Kranz

Member of Parliament for Waterloo North
- In office 1878–1887
- Preceded by: Isaac Erb Bowman
- Succeeded by: Isaac Erb Bowman

Personal details
- Born: 13 June 1834 Lehrbach, Hesse
- Died: 1 June 1902 (aged 67) Berlin, Ontario
- Party: Conservative
- Spouse: Catherine Seip (m. 1865)
- Children: 4
- Parent: Charles Kranz (father)
- Occupation: Businessman

Hugo Carl Kranz (13 June 1834 – 1 June 1902) was a German-born businessman and political figure in Ontario, Canada. He represented Waterloo North in the House of Commons of Canada from 1878 to 1887 as a Conservative member.

== Biography ==
Kranz was born on 13 June 1834 at Lehrbach in the Grand Duchy of Hesse, which was a part of the German Confederation. He was the only son of Charles Kranz. He was educated at the Polytechnische Schule of Darmstadt and came to the United States with his father in 1851. After four years, the father and son moved to Berlin, Ontario (later known as Kitchener). His father opened a general store there in partnership with Henry Stroh. Hugo became involved in running the store and took over its operations in 1875 after his father's death. It was advertised in an 1884 municipal directory as C. Kranz & Son. In 1865, he married Catherine Seip. Kranz served as town clerk (1859 to 1867), reeve (1869 to 1870) and mayor (1874 to 1878) of Berlin. He also was trustee and treasurer for the Berlin High School and a justice of the peace. Kranz helped found the Economical Mutual Fire Insurance Company and served as its manager and president. He was defeated when he ran for reelection in 1887 and 1891, losing to Isaac Erb Bowman each time.

Kranz died on 1 June 1902 at his home in Berlin after a brief illness. He is buried at Mount Hope Cemetery in Kitchener.

== See also ==
- List of German Canadians

Parliament of Canada
| Preceded by Isaac Erb Bowman | Member of Parliament for Waterloo North; 1878–1887 | Succeeded by Isaac Erb Bowman |
