= Henry L. Janzen =

Canadian politician (1845–1927)

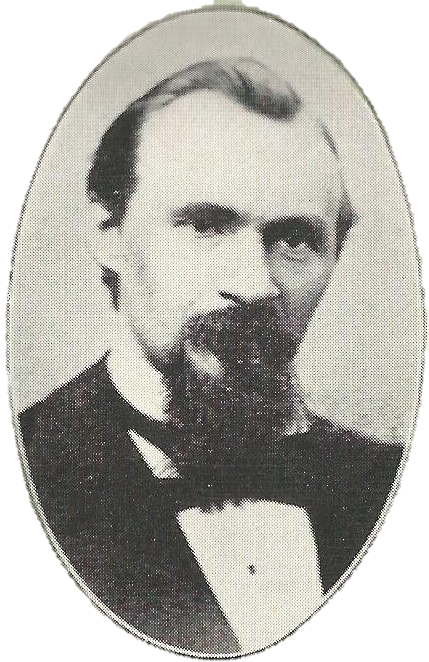
H. L. Janzen, 1912.

Henry Louis Janzen (June 27, 1845 – November 19, 1927) was a German-born nurseryman and politician in Ontario, Canada. He served as mayor of Berlin in 1890.

Janzen first came to the United States, but then moved to Canada, settling in New Hamburg in 1877. Two years later, he moved to Berlin, where he built the first greenhouses in the city. He served on the public school board and also helped found the Kitchener Horticultural Society. Janzen helped convince the Ontario Sugar Company to establish a sugar beet processing plant in Berlin in 1902.

Janzen retired to a farm in Breslau in 1909. He was the grandfather of Canadian politician and businesswoman Elizabeth Janzen Dreger. He died shortly after an automobile accident in 1927 and was buried at Mount Hope Cemetery in Kitchener.
