= Canadian International Council =

Canadian think tank on foreign relations

- Conseil international du Canada
- Predecessor: Canadian Institute of International Affairs
- Formation: 1928
- Type: Think tank
- Headquarters: Toronto, Ontario, Canada
- President: Vacant
- Chair: John English and Nicolas Rouleau
- Revenue: $724,922 (2021–22)
- Expenses: $747,424 (2021–22)
- Website: thecic.org

The Canadian International Council (CIC; French: Conseil international du Canada) is a Canadian organization dedicated to the study of foreign relations. Its stated goal is to strengthen Canada's role in international affairs, considering issues across academic disciplines, policy areas, and economic sectors.

The council is headquartered in Toronto, Ontario, with 19 branches across Canada, which organize speaker programs, study groups, conferences, and seminars. It has also established a pan-Canadian Young Professionals Network.

== History ==
=== Canadian Institute of International Affairs ===
The CIC has its roots in the Canadian Institute of International Affairs (CIIA), founded by former Prime Minister Robert Borden in 1928. In 1932, Escott Reid was appointed as the institute's first full-time national secretary, and began organizing annual study conferences, comprising round-table discussions in which members of branch study groups were invited to participate.

The first Commonwealth Relations Conference was held at Hart House at the University of Toronto, organised jointly by the CIIA and the Royal Institute of International Affairs. It was chaired by Borden, with Arnold Toynbee as the recorder. There were 77 international delegates, including future Canadian Governor General Vincent Massey, future New Zealand prime Minister Walter Nash, and future foreign minister of Pakistan Zafrullah Khan as an invited observer.

Under insurance executive Edgar Tarr (1938–1950), the organization moved beyond its original neutral and apolitical research role. It promoted Canadian national autonomy, sought to expand the nation's international influence, and challenged British imperialism. Canada's foreign policy moved away from imperialism and toward the sort of anti-colonialism promoted by the United States. CIIA leaders and Canadian officials worked to encourage nationalist forces in India, China, and Southeast Asia to reject colonial rule and Western dominance.

=== Canadian International Council ===
The first mention of the Canadian International Council was in 1950, with the stated objective "to give attention to Canada's position both as a member of the international community of nations and as a member of the British Commonwealth of Nations".

In October 2007, Jim Balsillie, formerly co-CEO of Research In Motion, initiated the CIC as a partnership between the CIIA and the Centre for International Governance Innovation (CIGI), a think tank based in Waterloo, Ontario, to create a research base on Canadian foreign policy similar to the American Council on Foreign Relations and the United Kingdom's Royal Institute of International Affairs. Announcement the new council, Balsillie wrote that "CIC will be a research-based, non-partisan vehicle. Applying expert and fact-based research to complex issues is the essential foundation for creating effective policy." In November 2007, members of the CIIA voted to become the Canadian International Council.

In May 2008, the Canadian Institute of Strategic Studies (CISS) folded its operations into the CIC as the Strategic Studies Working Group. In 2019, the Couchiching Institute on Public Affairs was merged into the CIC, and continues as an annual Couchiching event hosted by the CIC. In 2020, the online publication OpenCanada returned to the CIC after being under the management of the Centre for International Governance Innovation from 2015 to 2020.

== Governance and funding ==
The Canadian International Council is a non-profit organization and a registered charity with Canada Revenue Agency. Funding comes from private sponsorship, membership fees, donations, and events.

CIC branches are located in Calgary, Edmonton, Halifax, Hamilton, Montreal, Ottawa, Nipissing (North Bay), Prince George, Quebec, Regina, Saskatoon, Simcoe County, Thunder Bay, Toronto, Vancouver, Victoria, Waterloo, Whitehorse, Yukon and Winnipeg.

From 2018 to 2022, the president and research director of the CIC was Ben Rowswell, former ambassador to Venezuela. The CIC is overseen by a board of directors chaired by Nicolas Rouleau and John English.

== Research ==
=== Network for Democratic Solidarity ===
In 2021, with support from the Konrad Adenauer Foundation Canada, the CIC began a multi-year research project aimed at articulating a new form of mutual democracy promotion by Canada and Germany. This project, called "Renewing Our Democratic Alliance", promoted co-operation between democracies facing challenges to citizens' rights. At a 2022 conference on democratic backsliding at McGill University, hosted by the CIC and Toronto Metropolitan University, the CIC announced the creation of a Network for Democratic Solidarity, a group of nations aiming to help each other strengthen democracy. The Network for Democratic Solidarity became an independent organization in May 2023.

=== Foreign Policy by Canadians ===
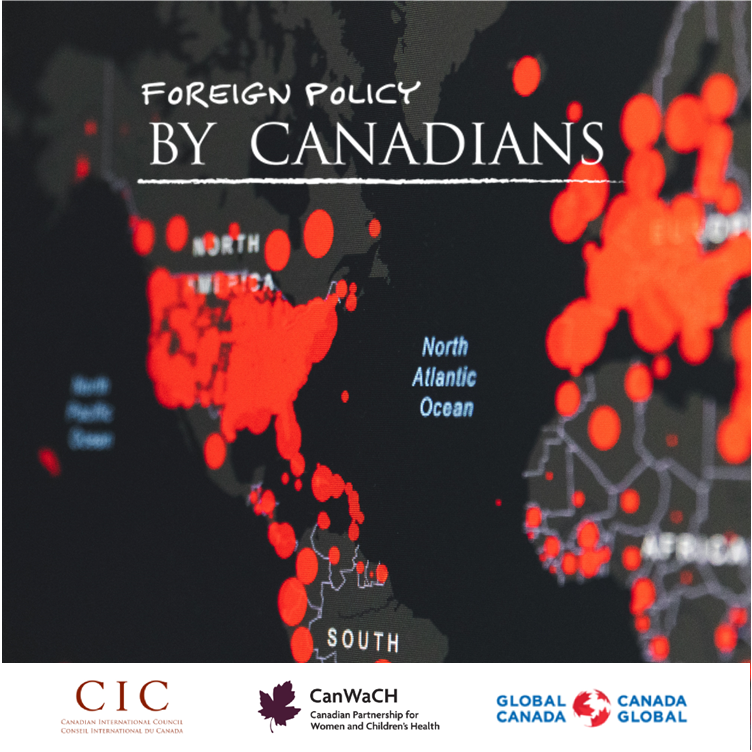
Foreign Policy by Canadians logo

Foreign Policy by Canadians was a joint initiative by the Canadian International Council (CIC), CanWaCH and Global Canada. This initiative involved a deliberative poll of Canadians to determine national priorities for Canada's foreign policy in the 2020s. CanWaCH and the CIC ran a deliberative democracy exercise with James S. Fishkin's Stanford Center for Deliberative Democracy. This project selected a sample of the Canadian population which was briefed on issues facing Canada, then deliberated on policy proposals to be presented to the Canadian government.

== Publications ==
International Journal
- Discipline: Interdisciplinary
- Language: English

Publication details
- History: 1946–present
- Publisher: SAGE (Canada)

Standard abbreviations
- ISO 4: Int. J.

Indexing
- ISSN: 0020-7020
- JSTOR: 00207020

Links
- Journal homepage; Online access

International Journal (IJ), established in 1946, is the CIC's scholarly publication and journal of global policy analysis. IJ is cross disciplinary, combining history, political science, and economics with anthropology and other social sciences. In 2013 the CIC partnered with the Bill Graham Centre for Contemporary International History and SAGE Publications to share publishing responsibilities for the journal.

The CIC also publishes Behind the Headlines. First published in 1940 as a pamphlet series focused on contemporary Canadian foreign policy, Behind the Headlines evolved first into a quarterly current affairs magazine, and then into its current form as a policy paper series.

== Awards ==
The CIC has been recognized at the Canadian Online Publishing Awards for its work with OpenCanada. In 2013 the site won the Content of the Year award, as well as two gold medals for best overall online-only publication and online-only article or series in the academic and nonprofit media category.
