= Entrepreneurial network =

In business, entrepreneurial networks are social organizations offering different types of resources to start or improve entrepreneurial projects. Having adequate human resources is a key factor for entrepreneurial achievements. Combined with leadership, the entrepreneurial network is a social network not only necessary to properly run the business or project, but also to differentiate the business from similar projects.

== Purpose ==
The goal of most entrepreneurial networks is to bring together a broad selection of professionals and resources that complement each other's endeavors. Initially, a priority is to aid successful business launches. Subsequently, to provide motivation, direction and increase access to opportunities and other skill sets. Promotion of each member's talents and services both within the network and out in the broader market increases opportunities for all participants.

One of the key needs of any startup is capital, and often entrepreneurial networks focus on providing such financial resources, particularly tailored to their membership demographic.

Entrepreneurial networks may also become community involved, endorsing reforms, legislation or other municipal drives that accommodate their organization's goals.

== Membership composition ==
- lawyers, various specialties
- scientists
- engineers
- architects
- contractors/construction managers
- real estate professionals
- suppliers
- government people or institutions
- partners
- high skilled employees
- clients or any other kind of social contacts that can make the entrepreneurial business (or project) successful
- mentors
- investors

== See also ==
- Social network
- Business network
- Business incubator
- Chambers of commerce
