= William George Weichel =

Canadian politician and merchant (1870-1949)

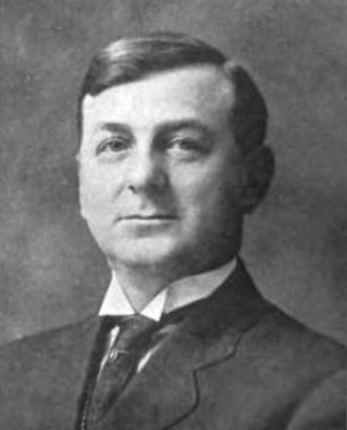

Member of the Legislative Assembly of Ontario
- In office 1923–1929
- Preceded by: Nicholas Asmussen
- Succeeded by: Sydney Charles Tweed
- Constituency: Waterloo North

Member of the House of Commons of Canada
- In office 1911–1917
- Preceded by: William Lyon Mackenzie King
- Succeeded by: William Daum Euler
- Constituency: Waterloo North

Personal details
- Born: July 20, 1870; Elmira, Ontario
- Died: May 2, 1949 (aged 78); Kitchener, Ontario
- Political party: Conservative
- Occupation: Merchant, politician

William George Weichel (July 20, 1870 – May 2, 1949) was a merchant and political figure in Ontario, Canada. He represented Waterloo North in the House of Commons of Canada from 1911 to 1917 as a Conservative member and in the Legislative Assembly of Ontario from 1923 to 1929.

== Biography ==
He was born in Elmira, Ontario, the son of Michael Weichel, who came to Canada from Hesse, Germany, and Margaret Schmidt. Weichel was educated in Elmira and Berlin (later Kitchener). He worked eight years as a clerk in his father's hardware store before becoming a salesman for a saw manufacturer in Galt. In 1896, Weichel opened a hardware store with other members of his family in Waterloo, later becoming sole owner. Weichel was also director for several insurance companies. In 1898, he married Jessie Rose Kinsman. He defeated William Lyon Mackenzie King to win a seat in the federal parliament in 1911. Weichel was defeated in a bid for reelection to the federal seat as a Unionist candidate in 1917. Weichel served as mayor of Waterloo from 1922 to 1923. He was unsuccessful in the provincial elections of 1929 and 1934. He died in Kitchener at the age of 78.
