= Louis Orville Breithaupt =

Canadian politician (1890-1960)

The Honourable Louis Orville Breithaupt

18th Lieutenant Governor of Ontario
- In office 18 February 1952 – 6 December 1957
- Monarch: Elizabeth II
- Governor General: Vincent Massey
- Premier: Leslie Frost
- Preceded by: Ray Lawson
- Succeeded by: John Keiller MacKay

Member of the Canadian Parliament for Waterloo North
- In office 19 August 1940 – 18 February 1952
- Preceded by: William Daum Euler
- Succeeded by: Norman Schneider
- Constituency: Waterloo North

Personal details
- Born: 28 October 1890 Berlin, Ontario
- Died: 12 December 1960 (aged 70) Toronto, Ontario
- Spouse(s): Sara Caskey; Mabel Louise White
- Children: Louis Paul Breithaupt, Mary Cram, Sara Bastedo, Herbert Breithaupt
- Parent: Louis Jacob Breithaupt (father)
- Education: University of Toronto
- Occupation: Businessman

Louis Orville Breithaupt (28 October 1890 – 6 December 1960) served as the 18th Lieutenant Governor of Ontario, Canada, from 1952 to 1957.

== Life and career ==
Born in Berlin (later Kitchener), Ontario, the son of Emma Alvarine (Devitt) and Louis Jacob Breithaupt, he was educated at the University of Toronto. He became head of his family's leather business, Breithaupt Leather Company, in Kitchener. He was a Kitchener alderman for four years, and in 1923 became the youngest mayor in the city's history. He was a Liberal Member of Parliament from 1940 to 1952. His sister Rosa Clark (née Rosa Breithaupt) founded the Guild of all Arts artist colony in Scarborough, Ontario, now the Guild Park and Gardens.

Breithaupt was appointed Lieutenant Governor of Ontario in 1952 and served until 1957.

In 1953, he was awarded an honorary LL.D from McMaster University.

Breithaupt was active in many service organizations, such as the YMCA and Rotary Club. In 1959, he became Chancellor of Victoria University. Breithaupt died in Toronto in 1960 at the age of 70. He was buried along with the rest of his family at Kitchener's Mount Hope Cemetery.

Government offices
Preceded by Ray Lawson	Lieutenant Governor of Ontario; 1952–1957	Succeeded by John Keiller MacKay
Parliament of Canada
Preceded by William Daum Euler	Member of Parliament for Waterloo North; 1940–1952	Succeeded by Norman Schneider
