= Guildwood =

- Neighbourhood
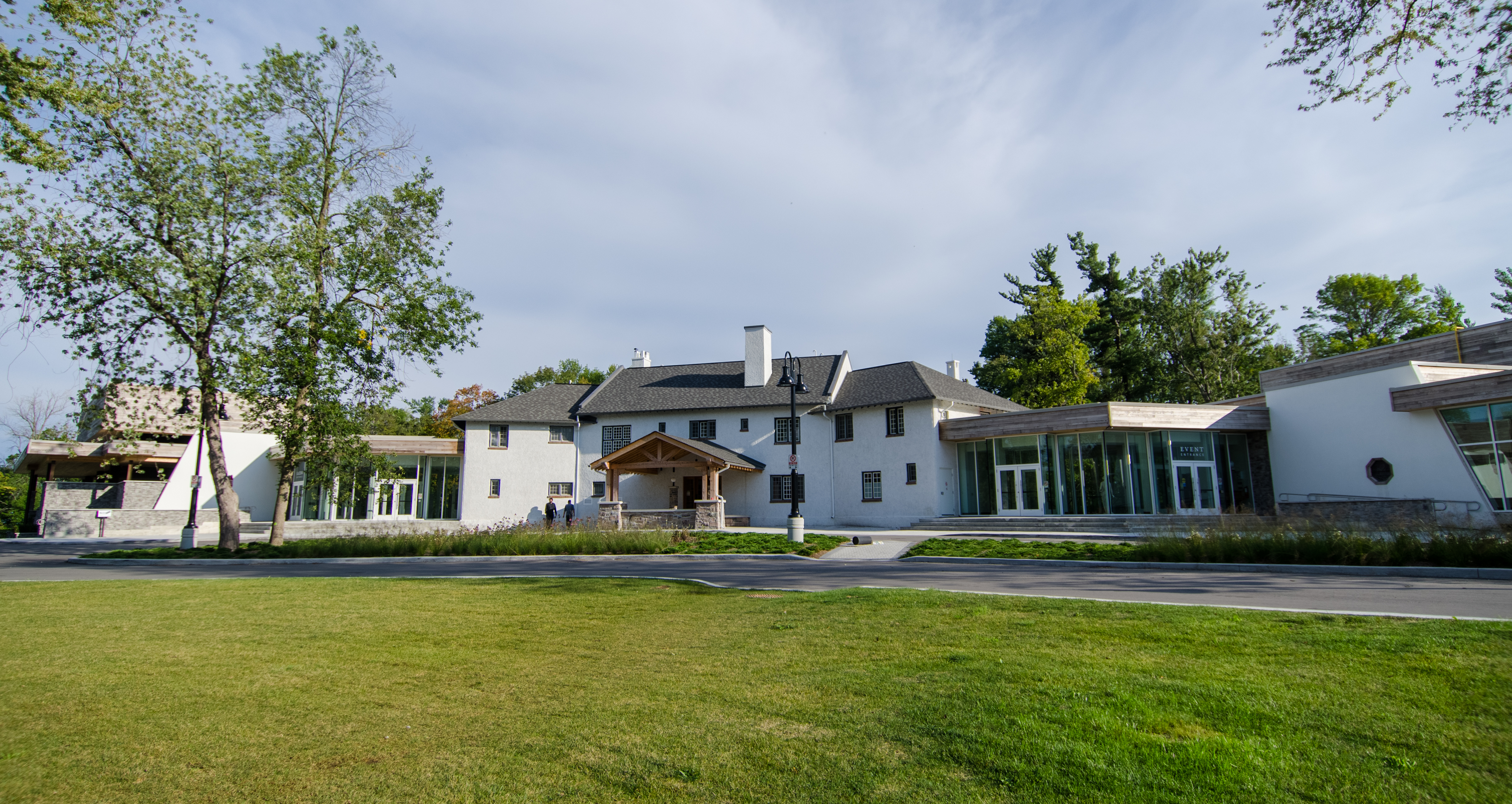
- View of the Guild Inn

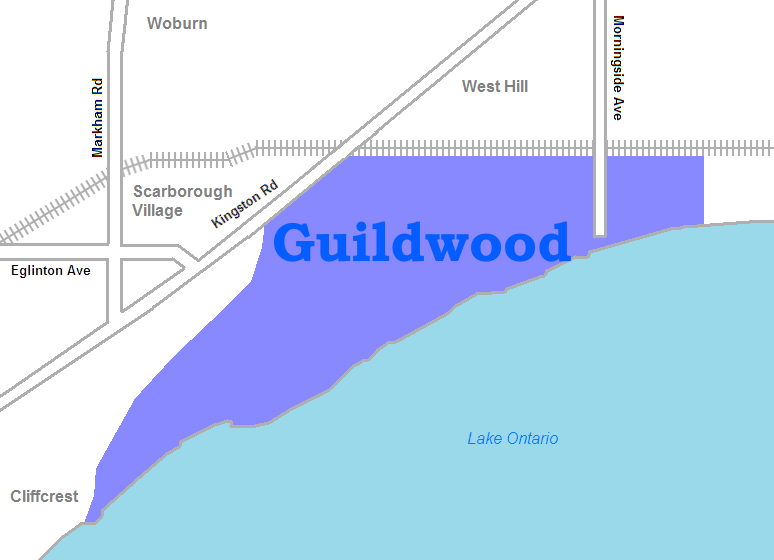
- Location of Guildwood within Toronto
- Coordinates: 43°44′51″N 79°11′58″W
- Country: Canada
- Province: Ontario
- City: Toronto
- Established municipality: 1850 Scarborough Township
- Developed: 1957 (Subdivision)
- Changed municipality: 1998 Toronto from City of Scarborough

Government
  - MP: John McKay (Scarborough-Guildwood)
  - MPP: Andrea Hazell (Scarborough—Guildwood)
  - Councillor: Paul Ainslie (Ward 43 Scarborough East)

Population
  - Total: Population(census tract 0,331.03) is 5,267 residents in 2,006 and 5,912 residents in 2,011. Population growth 12% between 2,006−2,011. Statistics Canada 2,006; Statistics Canada 2,011

Guildwood, also known as Guildwood Village, is a residential neighbourhood in Toronto, Ontario, Canada. It is located in the eastern area of the city, in the district of Scarborough. It is bounded by the Scarborough Bluffs, south of Kingston Road, from Grey Abbey Trail in the east.

== History ==
Its oldest building is the 18th century Osterhout Log Cabin situated along the bluffs. The log cabin is one of Toronto's oldest buildings still standing, although its exact date of construction is unknown.

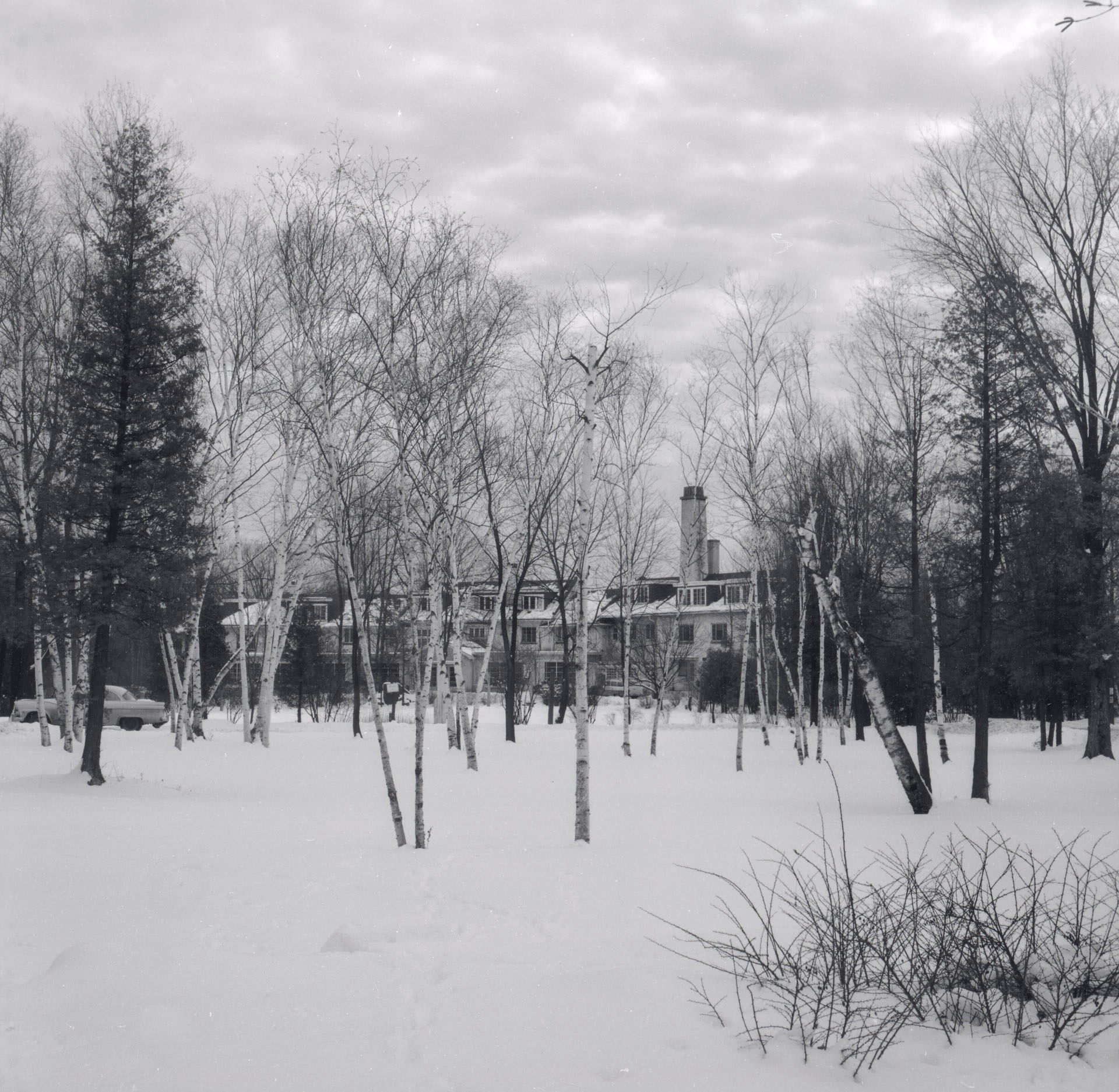
The Guild Inn in 1956, two years after it was acquired by Metropolitan Toronto.

In 1914, the Guild Inn was opened. Initially a private residence, it later became an art colony, and a hotel. From 1941 to 1947, the inn was leased by the Government of Canada as a base for the Women's Royal Naval Service, HMCS Bytown II, and later a military hospital.

After Metropolitan Toronto was formed in 1954, taxes on the Guild Inn property increased to the point that the owners Rosa and Spencer Clark decided to sell 450 acres (180 ha) of their property, which became the basis for the Guildwood Village subdivision. The Clarks remained involved with the development of the subdivision, in its design and layout to preserve as many trees in the area as possible. Development started in 1957 with the famous "Avenue of Homes" display of upscale homes. The community introduced a number of new ideas in subdivision design, including winding roads and cul-de-sacs to reduce through traffic, and underground power and phone lines. "Rear-lot parks were modelled after English footpaths as walkways within the community."

The Clarks helped design the entrance gates to the subdivision. After most of Toronto's Stanley Barracks (New Fort York) was demolished in 1953, its gates were salvaged and re-erected at the entrance to Guildwood Village. These gates, now called the "Guildwood Gates" still provide a unique and grand entrance to the community at the corner of Kingston Road and Guildwood Parkway.43°44′58″N 79°12′20″W

Guild Park is famous for its historical architectural fragments from the façades of demolished buildings in Downtown Toronto. Just west of the Guild Inn is Sir Wilfrid Laurier Collegiate Institute.

== Guildwood Village Flag ==
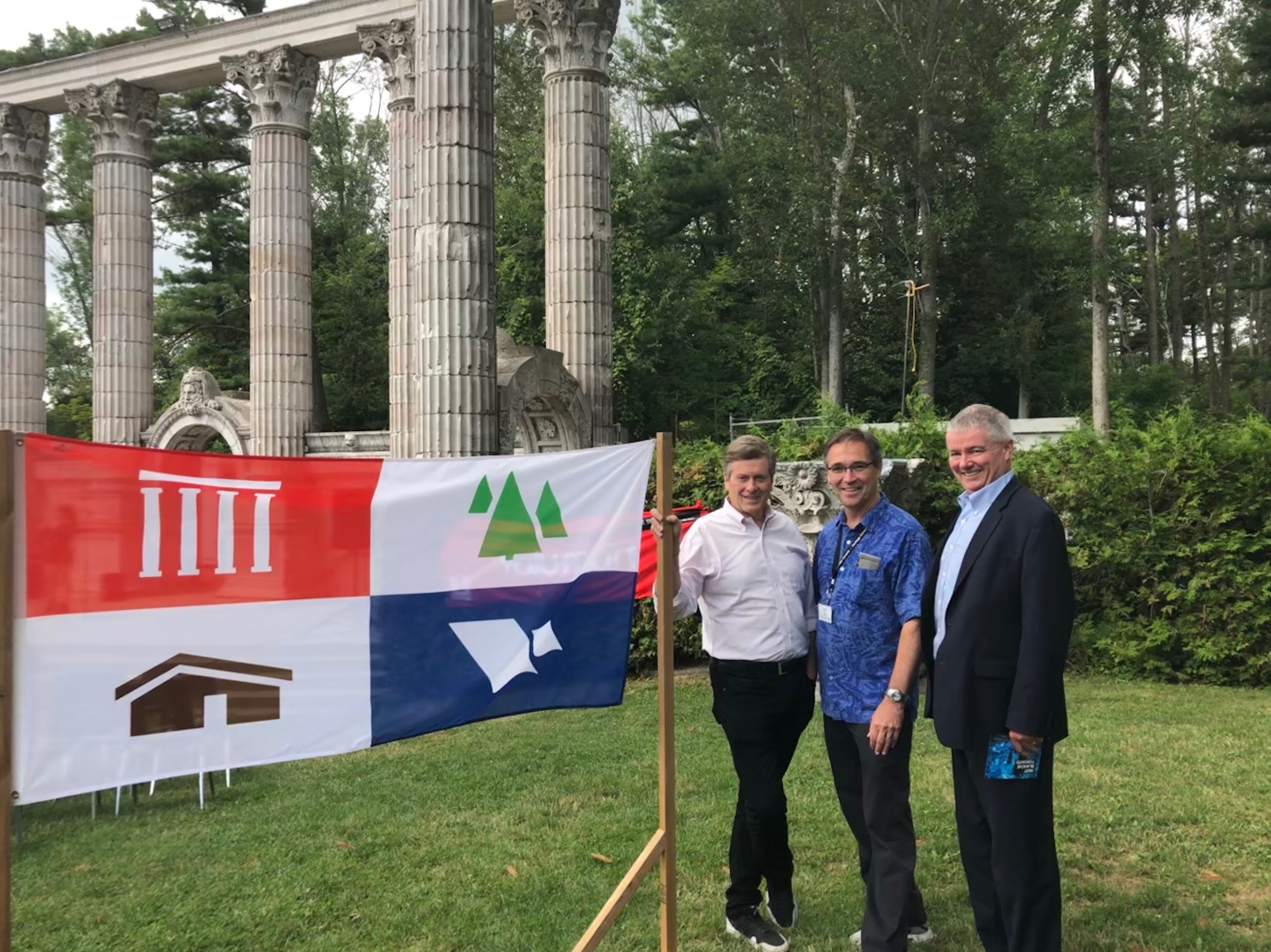
Guildwood Village Flag in Guild Park with former Toronto Mayor John Tory, Councillor Paul Ainslie and Friends of Guild Park President John Mason. Photo by Guildwoodian.

The Guildwood Village Flag was designed by Marsha Leverock Westergaard and was adopted by the Guildwood Village Community Association (GVCA) on June 12, 2018. The Guildwood Village flag can be seen flying in Guildwood Village from cars, store windows and residential flag poles.

The flag's four quadrants & their symbols and colours represent the Guildwood Village community. They read (1) Guild; (2) Wood; (3) Village; and (4) on the Bluffs. They represent Guildwood Village’s history of arts and culture, its woods and green spaces, its mid-century architecture, and the Scarborough bluffs.

== Education ==
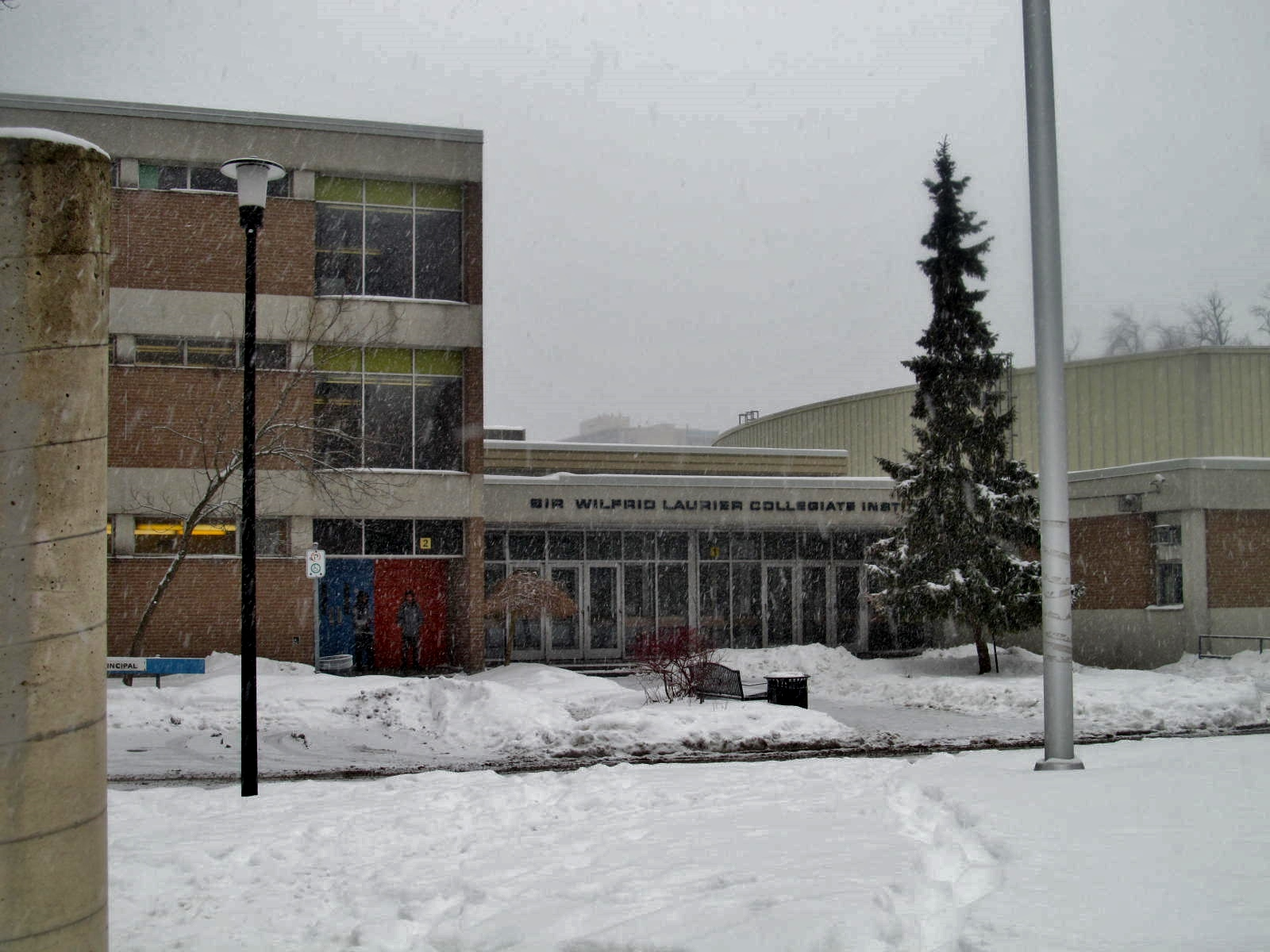
Sir Wilfrid Laurier Collegiate Institute is a public secondary school situated in Guildwood.

The Toronto District School Board (TDSB) is a secular public school board that operates several schools in the neighbourhood, including one secondary school, Sir Wilfrid Laurier Collegiate Institute. In addition to Sir Wilfrid Laurier, TDSB also operates several elementary schools in Guildwood. They include:

- Guildwood Junior Public School
- Elizabeth Simcoe Junior Public School
- Jack Miner Senior Public School
- Poplar Road Junior Public School

Other public school boards that provides schooling for students in Guildwood include the Conseil scolaire Viamonde (CSV), Conseil scolaire catholique MonAvenir (CSCM), and the Toronto Catholic District School Board (TCDSB). CSV is a French-based secular public school board, whereas CSCM and TCDSB are separate public school boards, the former being French-based.

== Recreation ==
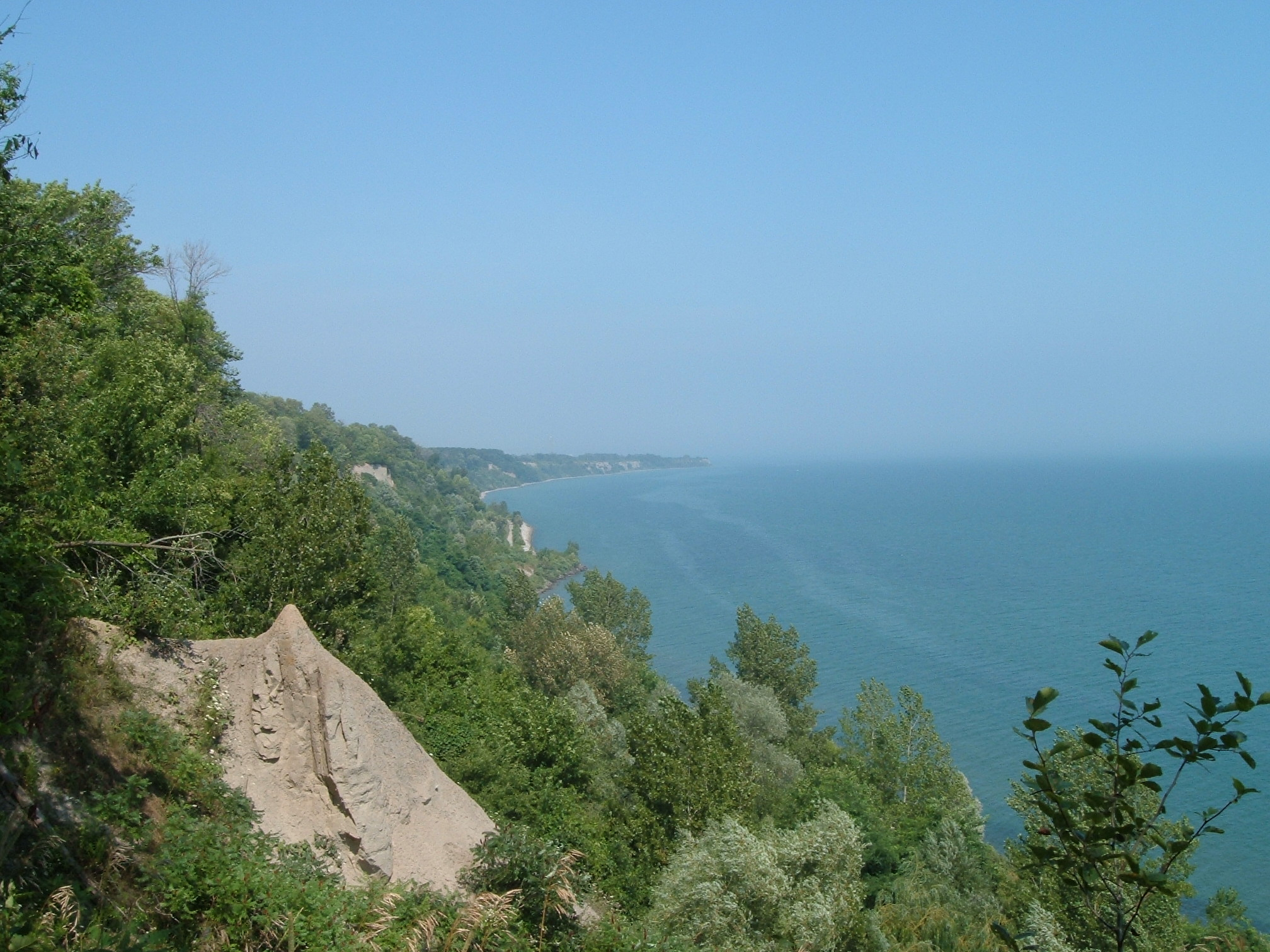
View of the Scarborough Bluffs from Guild Park and Gardens.

Guildwood is home to several municipal parks, all of which are managed by Toronto Parks, Forestry and Recreation Division. Many of these parks are situated near the Scarborough Bluffs and the Toronto waterfront.

Parks in Guildwood include Elizabeth Simcoe Park, Grey Abbey Park, Guild Park and Gardens, South Marine Park, and Sylvan Park. Guild Park and Gardens is notable for its collection of relics, collected from the remains of demolished buildings primarily from Downtown Toronto.

== Transportation ==
Public transportation in Guildwood is provided by the Toronto Transit Commission (TTC). The TTC operates several bus routes through the neighbourhood.

In addition to TTC routes, GO Transit's commuter rail service may be accessed from Guildwood GO Station. In addition to being a station for the GO Transit Lakeshore East line, the station is also used by Via Rail, an intercity train service.

=== Street ===
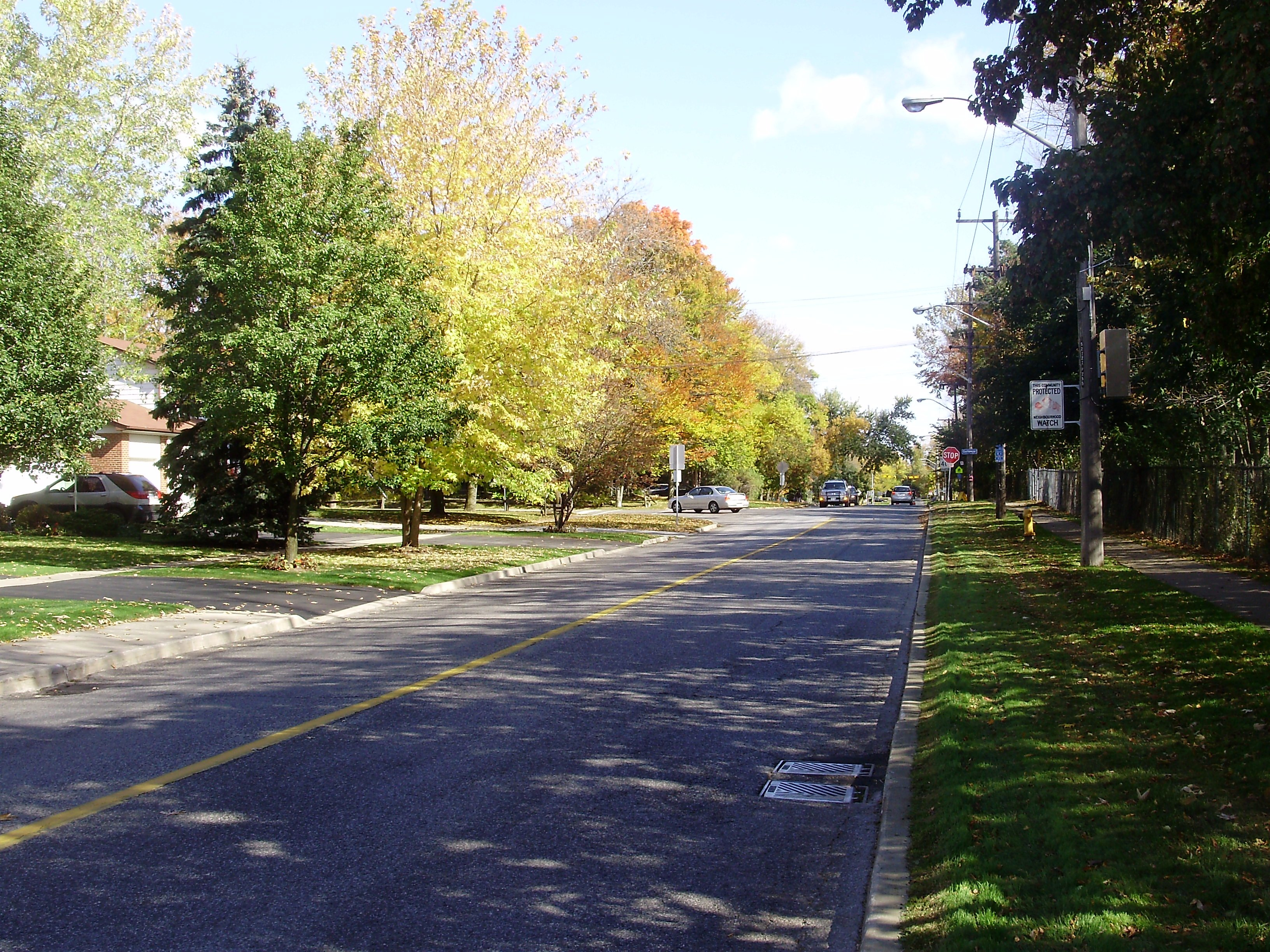
Guildwood Parkway is a major roadway in Guildwood.

Guildwood Parkway is the main roadway in Guildwood. The eastern end of the roadway splits north, and east, with the northern portion forming Morningside Avenue. Many of the streets in the Guildwood development were named by Rosa and Spencer Clark.

- Bethune - after Dr. Norman Bethune
- Bledlow - after the England home of Spencer Clark's grandmother
- Bournville - after the Cadbury's Chocolate model town in England
- Cadbury Court - after the Cadbury family
- Catalina - after the island off the coast of California
- Earswick - after the Rowntree Chocolate model town in Yorkshire, England
- Livingston Road - after the owner of the property who was treasurer of the T. Eaton Company
- Nuffield - after Lord Nuffield (William Morris), founder of Morris Automobiles in Britain
- Rowatson - after Robert Watson McClain, owner of the farm the street is sited upon
- Sir Raymond - who planned a model town in Manchester, England
- Somerdale Square - after the Fry family
- Sonneck Circle, Sonneck Square - an old castle in Germany
- Toynbee Trail - after Arnold Toynbee, British Historian, Professor and Author
- Westlake Road - after the brothers who were developers of the property.

Source: Lidgold
