= Toronto Star Building =

Toronto Star Building can refer to:

- Old Toronto Star Building
- One Yonge Street
