= Osterhout Log Cabin =

Coordinates: 43.745789°N 79.193293°W

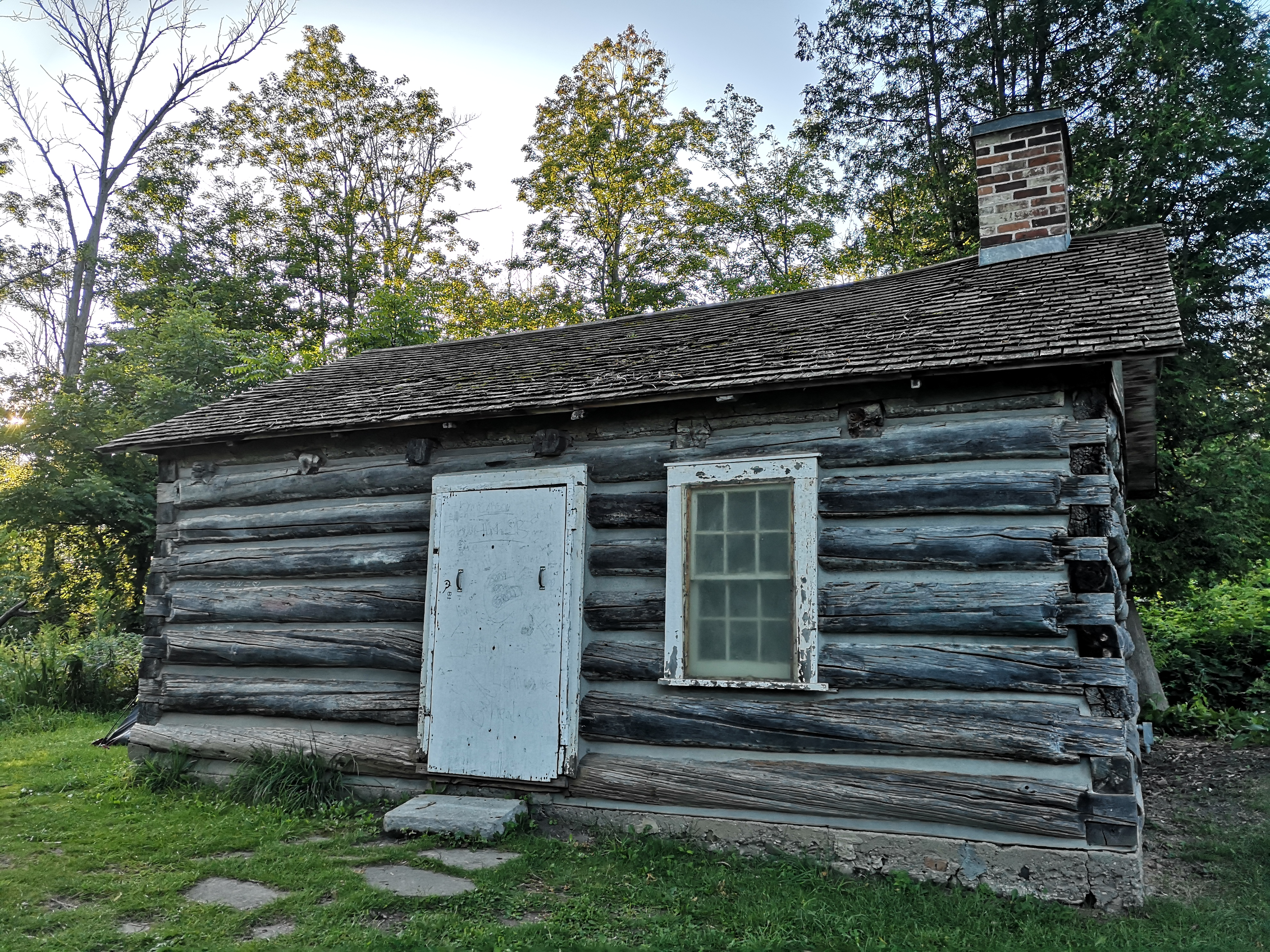
- Osterhout Log Cabin
- Interactive map of the Osterhout Log Cabin area

The Osterhout Log Cabin is a log cabin located within Guild Park and Gardens, Guildwood, Scarborough, Toronto, Ontario, Canada. Situated along the Scarborough Bluffs, the cabin is one of the oldest remaining buildings in Scarborough, Toronto. The year the building was erected is unknown, although it was documented in local records by the mid-19th century. The property was acquired by the Guild Inn in 1934, and is situated today in the Guild Park and Gardens. It is a designated heritage building.

== History ==
=== Date of construction ===
The building's construction date is unknown. One claim is that it was commissioned by lieutenant-governor of Upper Canada John Graves Simcoe and built around 1795 by Augustus Jones. Local lore suggests that the cabin was built by Jones and his survey team as a shelter while surveying the Scarborough lakeshore. However, Jones left no account of having built a cabin, and recorded that his surveying team lived in tents.

The building's namesake comes from William Osterhout, a United Empire Loyalist who in 1805 was given the first Crown land grant from King George III as reward for his service with the Butler's Rangers. Although Osterhout briefly owned the property, he never settled in Scarborough Township.

The property was later owned by Alexander McDonnell, Duncan Cameron, and John Ewart, although no evidence suggests that they built the cabin. James Humphreys bought the property in 1845. In 1996, University of Toronto faculty member, Marti Latta conducted an archaeological excavation of the property, concluding that Humphreys was the most likely person to have erected the building; with Latta suggesting a date some point after Humphreys acquired the property in 1845.

=== Use ===
Humphrey's son and family are the first recorded residents in the cabin, in 1861.

The building was acquired by the Guild Inn in 1934. As part of the 1978 sale of the Guild Inn property, the land around the cabin came under the administration of the Toronto Region Conservation Authority. In 1980, the then Borough of Scarborough designated the cabin as the Osterhout Cabin, and granted it protected heritage status. Some test pits were dug around the cabin in 1994 to determine its age.

== See also ==
- List of oldest buildings and structures in Toronto
