= Exchange Tower =

Skyscraper in Toronto

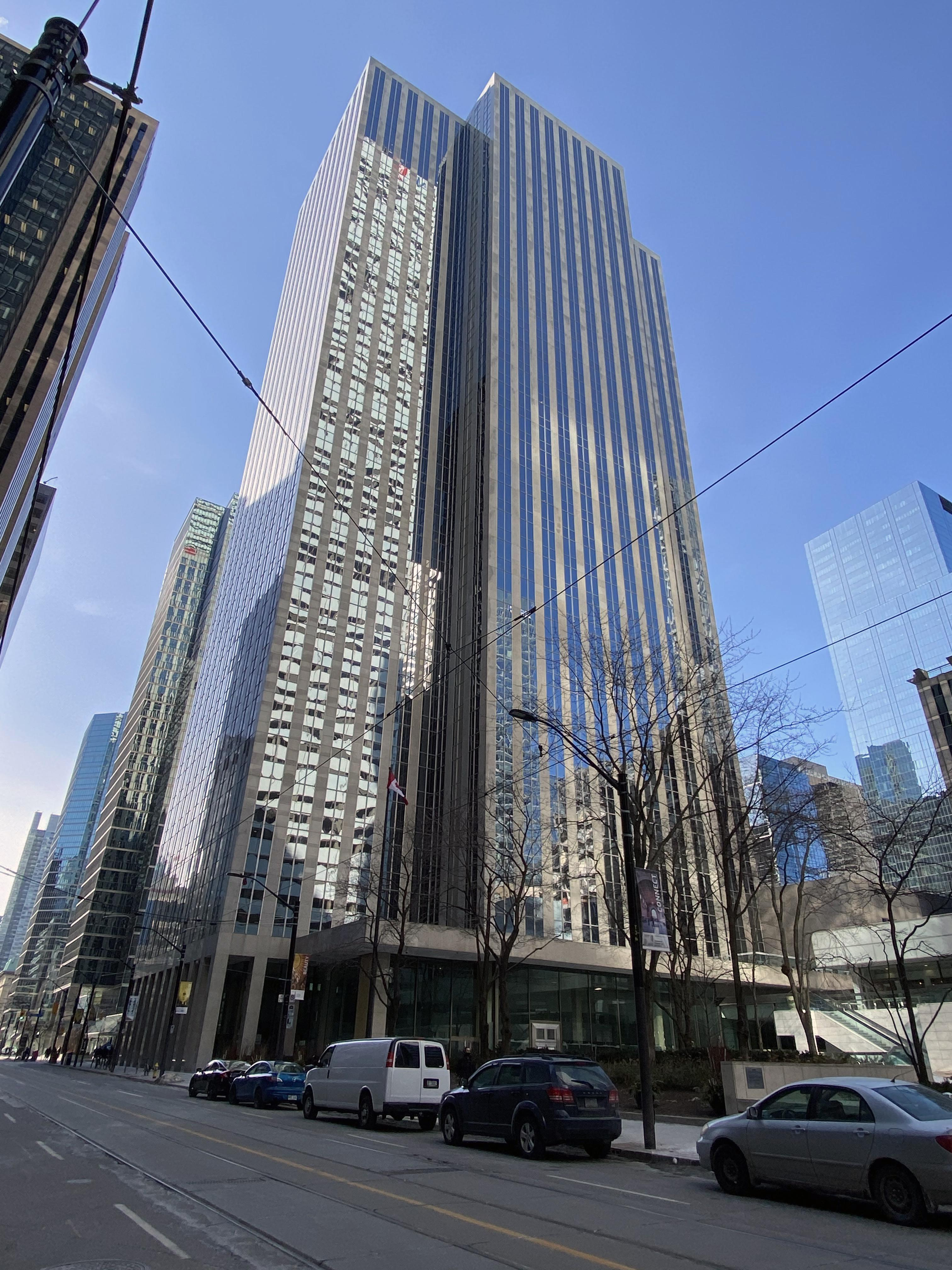
- Interactive map of the Exchange Tower area

General information
- Type: Commercial offices
- Location: 130 King Street West; Toronto, Ontario
- Coordinates: 43.6483°N 79.3833°W
- Completed: 1981
- Owner: Brookfield Properties
- Management: Brookfield Properties

Height
- Roof: 146 m (479 ft)

Technical details
- Floor count: above ground: 36 below ground: 5

Design and construction
- Architect: Original Building – B+H Architects / Subsequent Work – WZMH Architects
- Developer: Olympia & York Properties
- Structural engineer: Hidi Rae Consulting Engineers

Exchange Tower is a 36 storey 146 m (479 ft) tower in the First Canadian Place complex of Toronto, Ontario, Canada completed in 1981. The International style building is named for the Toronto Stock Exchange, which is the building's highest-profile tenant. The building was built on the site of the William H. Wright Building.

Located in the heart of Toronto’s Financial District at the corner of King and York Streets, the Exchange Tower is also home to National Bank Financial, offices of the federal Department of Justice, and the Toronto campus of the University of Western Ontario's Ivey Business School. In April 2018, Restaurant Brands International announced that they would be moving their head office into the Exchange Tower.
