= Rosa and Spencer Clark =

Canadian artist colony operators

Rosa Breithaupt Hewetson Clark (June 19, 1888 – July 7, 1981) and Herbert Spencer Clark (October 10, 1903 – February 11, 1986) were a Canadian couple that founded The Guild of All Arts artist colony in Toronto, Ontario, Canada. The couple founded the Guild Inn to support the colony and saved numerous relics from Toronto buildings that were demolished, creating the Guild Park and Gardens collection. The couple also helped found the Robert Owens Foundation promoting co-operative enterprises. Spencer Clark was named to the Order of Canada. Both were involved in numerous institutions and civic organizations.

== Rosa Breithaupt Hewetson Clark ==
Rosa Melvina Breithaupt was born in Berlin, Ontario to Louis Jacob Breithaupt and Emma Devitt Breithaupt. Rosa was one of eight children, five girls, and three boys. Her brother Louis would later become Lieutenant-Governor of Ontario. and four members of the Breithaupt family would become mayors of Kitchener (as Berlin was renamed).

Rosa was educated in Whitby, Ontario at the Ontario Ladies College, graduating in 1909. Through the Christian Endeavour Movement, Rosa meets Russell Hewetson, the owner of a shoe-making company. Hewetson is the brother of Vera Mildred Davis, mother of future Ontario Premier Bill Davis. Rosa and Russell were married in 1917. Rosa and Russell are the parents of three daughters and one son before Russell died of pneumonia in 1928. Rosa then took over management of the Hewetson shoe company. In the period 1928–1932, Rosa tried unsuccessfully to turn the company into a co-operative enterprise.

In 1932, Rosa Hewetson bought the 40 acres (16 ha) property in Scarborough then known as Cliff Acres. She also helps found the Robert Owen Foundation, a movement to promote social concerns and co-operative enterprise. Through the Robert Owen Foundation, she meets Herbert Spencer Clark. Hewetson invites Clark to see Cliff Acres. The two were married in August of that year on the estate.

Rosa, along with managing the Inn, also was a life member of the Royal Ontario Museum, the Art Gallery of Ontario, the Ontario Historical Society, the Women's Canadian Historical Society and the Robert Owen Foundation. She was a trustee of the International Society of Christian Endeavour, and vice-president of the Women's Canadian Club. In 1978, Rosa was awarded the Scarborough Award of Merit.

Rosa Clark died on July 7, 1981, at Scarborough Centenary Hospital at the age of 93. Her funeral was held at Yorkminster Park Baptist Church and buried in Mount Pleasant Cemetery in Toronto. Among her pallbearers was the Hon. Margaret Birch, former Ontario Premier Bill Davis, Federal Minister the Hon. Paul Cosgrove, Scarborough Mayor Gus Harris, Kenneth Thomson and the Hon. Thomas Leonard Wells.

== Herbert Spencer Clark ==
Herbert Spencer Clark was born in Toronto, one of five children of John and Esther Clark. The family was middle-class, father John working in the food products industry. During the summers, the Clarks would live on Ward's Island in a cottage. In 1924, Clark graduated from the University of Toronto with a degree in Applied Science and then worked as an engineer for Ontario Hydro and Taylor Electric. In 1931, Clark took a trip to Russia and witnessed the struggle between Communists and Nazi sympathizers. Clark became a speaker, talking about the experience. He became involved in the Robert Owen Foundation to promote social justice and the co-operative movement. It was through the movement that Clark met Rosa Hewetson.

Clark was involved in many civic organizations and institutions. He was a member of the President's Committee of the University of Toronto, a life member of the Art Gallery of Ontario, the Royal Ontario Museum, the Ontario Historical Society, the York Pioneers, the Architectural Conservancy of Ontario, the Metropolitan Toronto Board of Trade, the Granite Club, the Arts and Letters Club, the Museum of Modern Art, the Ontario Institute of Painters, the Student Christian Movement, the International Society of Christian Endeavour and the Robert Owen Foundation. Clark was made an honorary member of the Royal Architectural Institute of Canada in 1979 and the International Association of Architects in 1980. He was awarded Scarborough's Award of Merit in 1978, the Order of Canada in 1983, a Toronto Historical Board Special Award in 1984 and a gold medal, Royal Canadian Academy of Arts Medal and Doctor of Laws in 1985 from the University of Waterloo.

Spencer Clark died on February 11, 1986, at 82 years of age. His funeral was held at Yorkminster Park Baptist Church and was buried at Mount Pleasant Cemetery. His pallbearers included the Hon. John Black Aird, the Hon. Margaret Birch, A. J. Casson, former Ontario Premier Bill Davis, Scarborough Mayor Gus Harris, the Hon. Pauline Mills McGibbon, the Rt. Hon. D. Roland Michener, Kenneth Thomson and others.

== The Guild of All Arts ==
Rosa and Spencer Clark took their honeymoon on a road trip to the United States and stayed at Roycroft, a craftsman co-operative. Upon returning to Toronto the couple founded The Guild of All Arts in 1932. Rosa still received an income from the Hewetson shoe-making business, and Spencer invested his savings in the democratic crafts co-operative.

To support the artists, the Clarks built The Studio from a stable and garage. The buildings dated from the time of the original owner Colonel Harold Bickford. The stable was for his polo ponies and the garage was for his chauffeur and two cars. These were joined to form The Studio. The stable became a workshop for pewter and copper; the garage a wood-working shop. The second floors were for weaving, batik, tooled leather, block printing, and ceramics. An addition was built to create a shop of exhibits and items for sale. In 1957, another addition was added which became the woodworking studio. In 1960, The Studio was renovated again to become meeting space for conferences and wedding receptions, with an apartment on the second floor. A serving kitchen was added in 1963. The Studio was in use until 2003 when the Inn closed. It was boarded up and left unused. It was vandalized and burned down in 2008.

After World War II, the Guild Inn could no longer afford to subsidize the craftsmen. Some artists returned to the Inn, while others relocated their studios and sent their work to The Studio craft shop for sale. Artists, musician, sculptors and other crafts people continued to work at the Guild. Herman Riedl, a cabinet maker worked out of the Guild for 32 years. Two of the cabins were lived in by sculptors, the log cabin was used for teaching and another for work space. The sculptors included Elizabeth Fraser Williamson, Dorsey James, Tom Feenstra and Gerd Untermann.

== Legacy ==
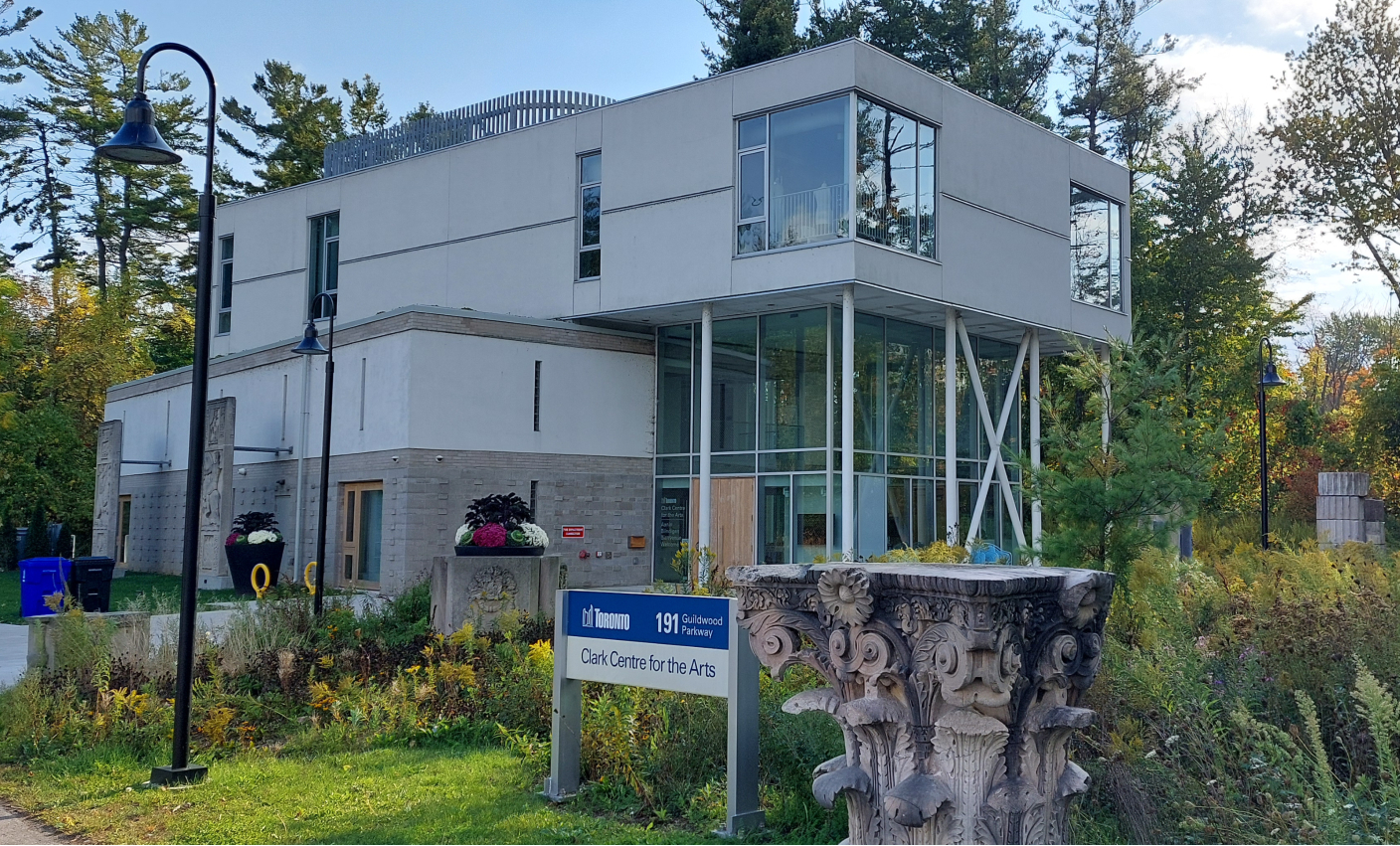
Clark Centre for the Arts building at Guild Park

Rosa and Spencer Clark's Guild Inn building remains, along with the sculpture garden, and the Osterhout log cabin, in the Guild Park and Gardens, owned by the Toronto and Region Conservation Authority and operated by the City of Toronto government. The Guild Inn itself was restored and converted into an event venue.

Spencer and Rosa Clark Parkette in the Guildwood Village neighbourhood is dedicated in their memory. Guildwood Village was developed by the Clarks after World War II, when property tax hikes caused the Clarks to have to sell much of their estate. It remains much as it was developed in 1957.

The former Guild Inn office and storage building was renovated and a third floor added to create the Clark Centre for the Arts. It provides art programming and studio space for the community.
