= Old Toronto Star Building =

Canadian office tower, completed in 1929, demolished in 1972

Toronto Star Building
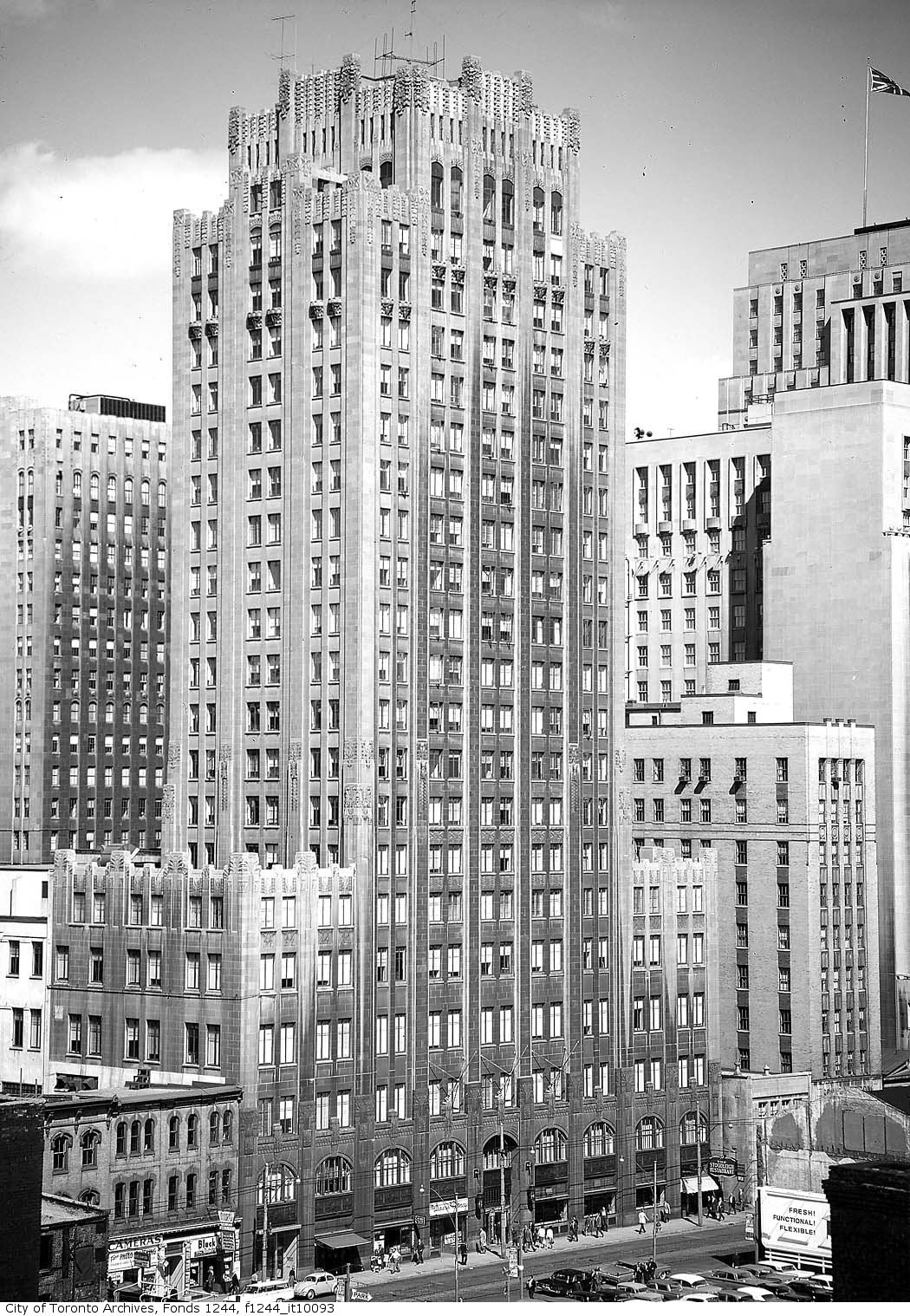
- Toronto Star building in 1961.

General information
- Status: Demolished
- Type: Office (Newspaper publishing)
- Location: 80 King West; Toronto, Ontario
- Completed: 1929
- Demolished: 1972
- Cost: CA$1.5 million
- Owner: Toronto Star

Height
- Roof: 88 metres (289 ft)

Technical details
- Floor count: 22

Design and construction
- Architect: Chapman and Oxley

The Old Toronto Star Building was an Art Deco office tower in Toronto, Ontario, Canada. The building was at 80 King Street West and was the headquarters of the Toronto Star newspaper from 1929 until 1971. The building was demolished in 1972 to make way for the construction of First Canadian Place.

The skyscraper is the second tallest voluntarily demolished building in Canada behind the 120.1 m (394 ft) tall Empire Landmark Hotel that was demolished in 2019.

== Overview ==
The building was designed by the firm of Chapman and Oxley and officially opened on 4 February 1929. Movers had just over one-day, starting on Saturday evening, 2 February 1929, to move the Linotype plant from the old 18 King Street West building to the new one at 80 King Street West. They were successful, and The Star printed its first edition of the paper on Monday on time.

It was 22 storeys and 88 metres (289 ft) tall. The front facade around the main entrance was clad in granite, the entrance itself having a bronze screen. The first three floors of the building were clad in granite; the upper floors in limestone. On the third floor, the facade was wrapped in elaborate stonework in geometric and floral motifs, which also adorned the interior and the limestone piers at the crest of the building. The first six floors were built in reinforced concrete, while the tower was built with a structural steel frame.

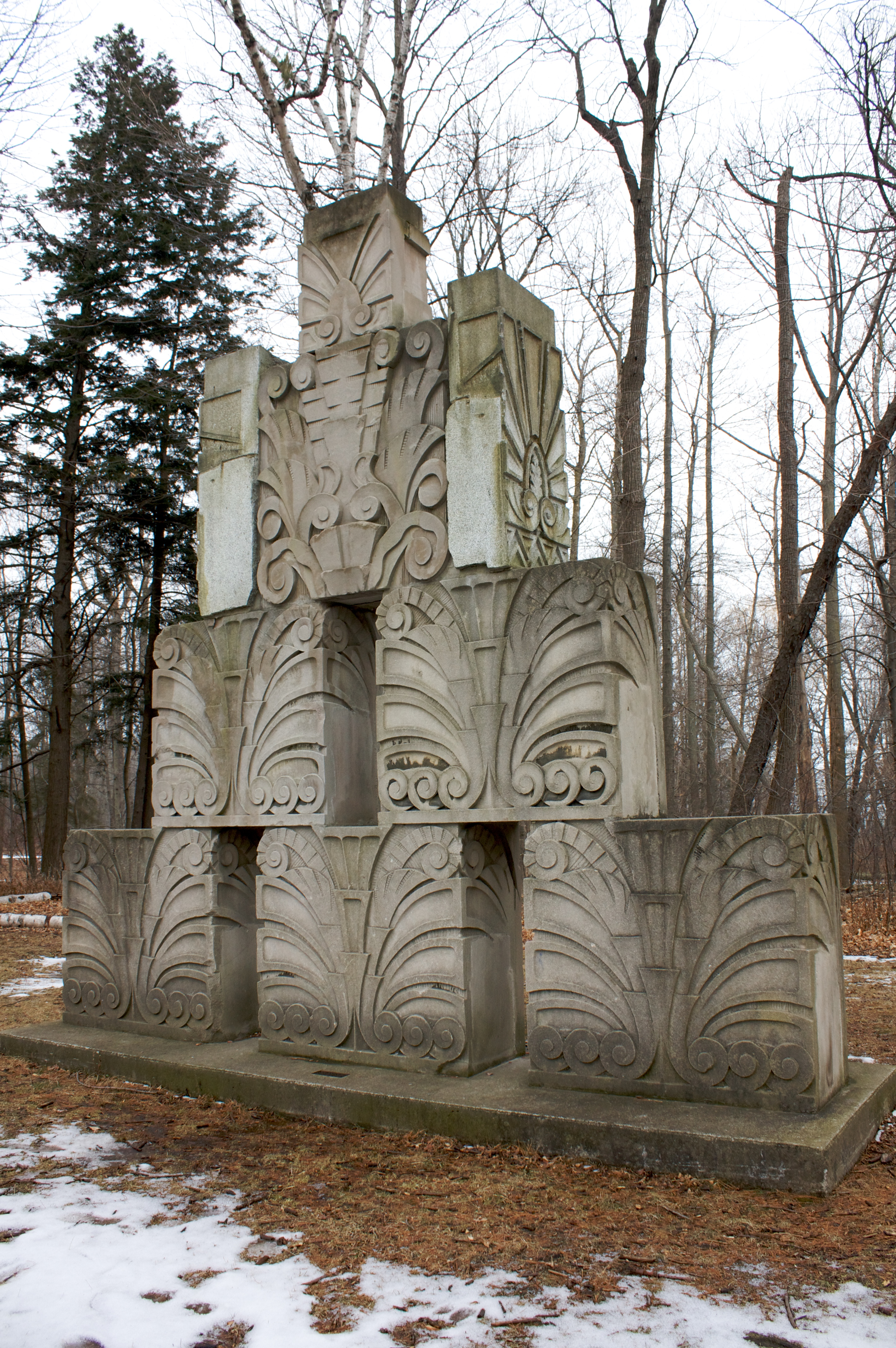
Decorative stone panels and parapets from the Toronto Star building's sixth and other floors, now located at the Guild Park and Gardens.

The first six stories held the offices of the Star, and the rest was rental office space. The 21st floor housed the newspaper's radio studios. The ground floor facing King Street housed a few retail stores and a Stoodleigh's Restaurant at the east end. The basement had a restaurant and barbershop.

Some stonework from the building can be found at Guild Park and Gardens, along with other portions of facades of lost buildings of Toronto.

== In popular culture ==
Superman co-creator Joe Shuster, a Toronto native and former Star newsboy, used the building as a model for the Daily Planet Building.

== See also ==
- First Canadian Place—previously the site for The Toronto Star building
- One Yonge Street— home of The Toronto Star 1971 to 2022.
- Toronto Star
- Toronto Star Press Centre
- William H. Wright Building—former home of The Globe and Mail, located near the Star Building
