= Guild Inn =

Artist colony and hotel in Toronto, Canada

Coordinates: 43°44′51.5″N 79°11′32″W

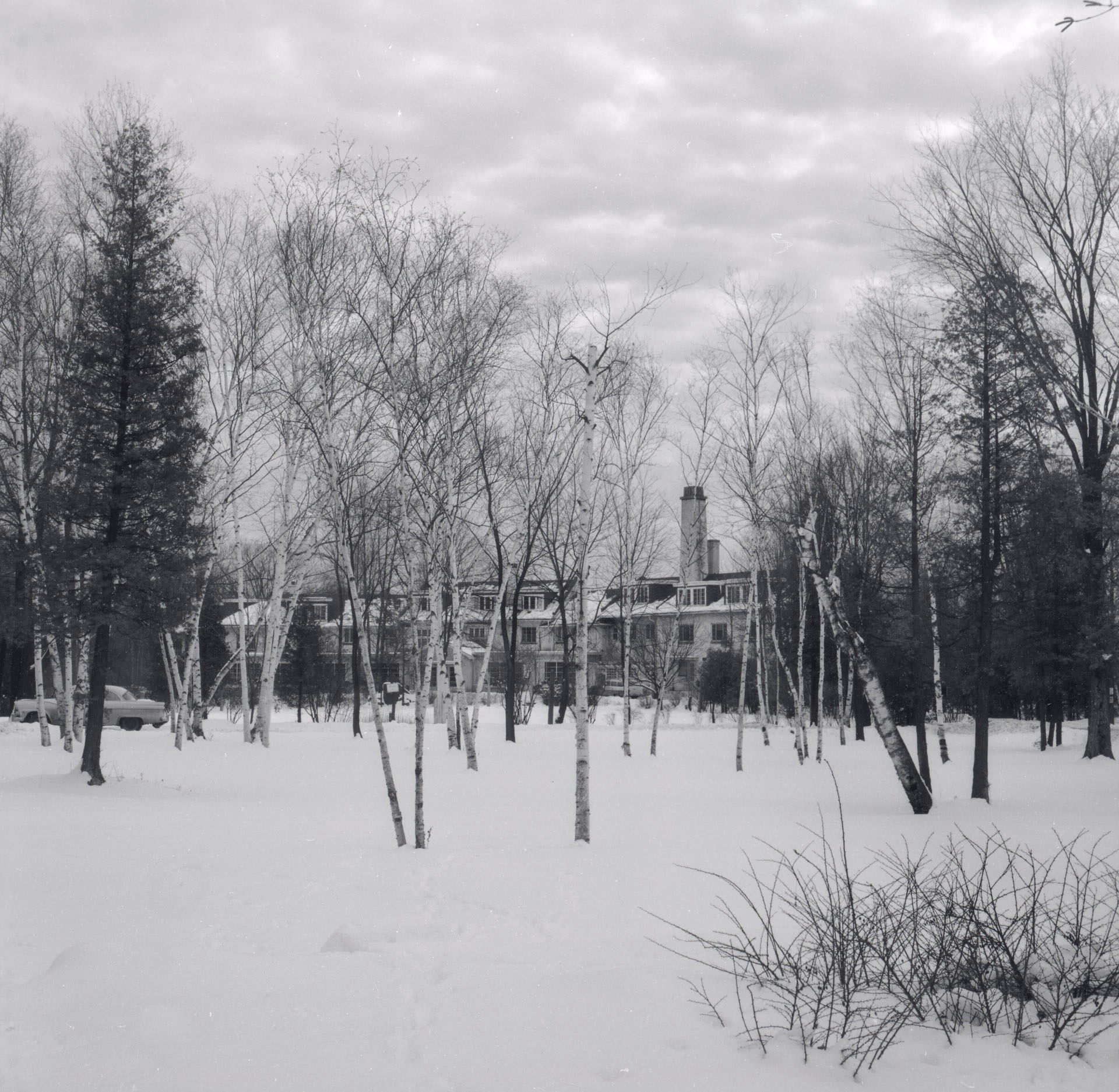
- Inn in 1956
- Interactive map of the Guild Inn area

General information
- Location: 201 Guildwood Parkway, Toronto, Canada
- Opened: 1914, 2017
- Renovated: 2014-2017
- Closed: 2001
- Owner: City of Toronto government

Technical details
- Grounds: 36 ha

The Guild Inn, or simply The Guild was a historic hotel in the Guildwood neighbourhood of Scarborough, Toronto, Ontario and was once an artists colony. The surrounding Guild Park and Gardens is notable for a sculpture garden consisting of the rescued facades and ruins of various demolished downtown Toronto buildings such as bank buildings, the old Toronto Star building and the Granite Club. The park is situated on the Scarborough Bluffs with views of Lake Ontario. Guild Park remained open and the refurbishment of the Guild Inn into a facility for social events was completed in May 2017.

== History ==
In 1914, the property (40 acres (16 ha) at that time) was known as Ranelagh Park, owned by Colonel Harold Bickford. Bickford built Bickford House, a 33-room, Arts and Crafts-style manor house on the property. In 1921, the property was sold to the Roman Catholic Church's Foreign Mission Society and renamed the China Mission College. In 1923, it was purchased by Richard Veech Look, who lived with his family at the mansion until 1927, when he was transferred to Quebec.

The property was vacant until 1932, when it was purchased by Rosa Breithaupt Hewetson. In August of that year, Hewetson married Herbert Spencer Clark in a ceremony on the estate. For a honeymoon, the couple chose to go on a motor trip to the United States to "visit co-operative organizations similar to the type in which they are both keenly interested." Both were directors of the Robert Owen Foundation, which was founded that year, an organization that supported the development of co-operative organizations and was named after utopian socialist Robert Owen.

The couple chose to reside in the mansion, and there fostered the arts, turning the property into an artist colony, modelled after Roycroft in East Aurora, New York, a centre of the Arts and Crafts movement. By the time of the Second World War it had become The Guild of All Arts. Across their property, the Clarks built homes and workshops for artists, such as The Studio, which was assembled out of a garage and a stable from different parts of the grounds; it accommodated those practising batik, woodworking, weaving, and metalworking. The Clarks also began collecting architectural elements from demolished buildings and erecting them in the gardens of the Guild as follies.

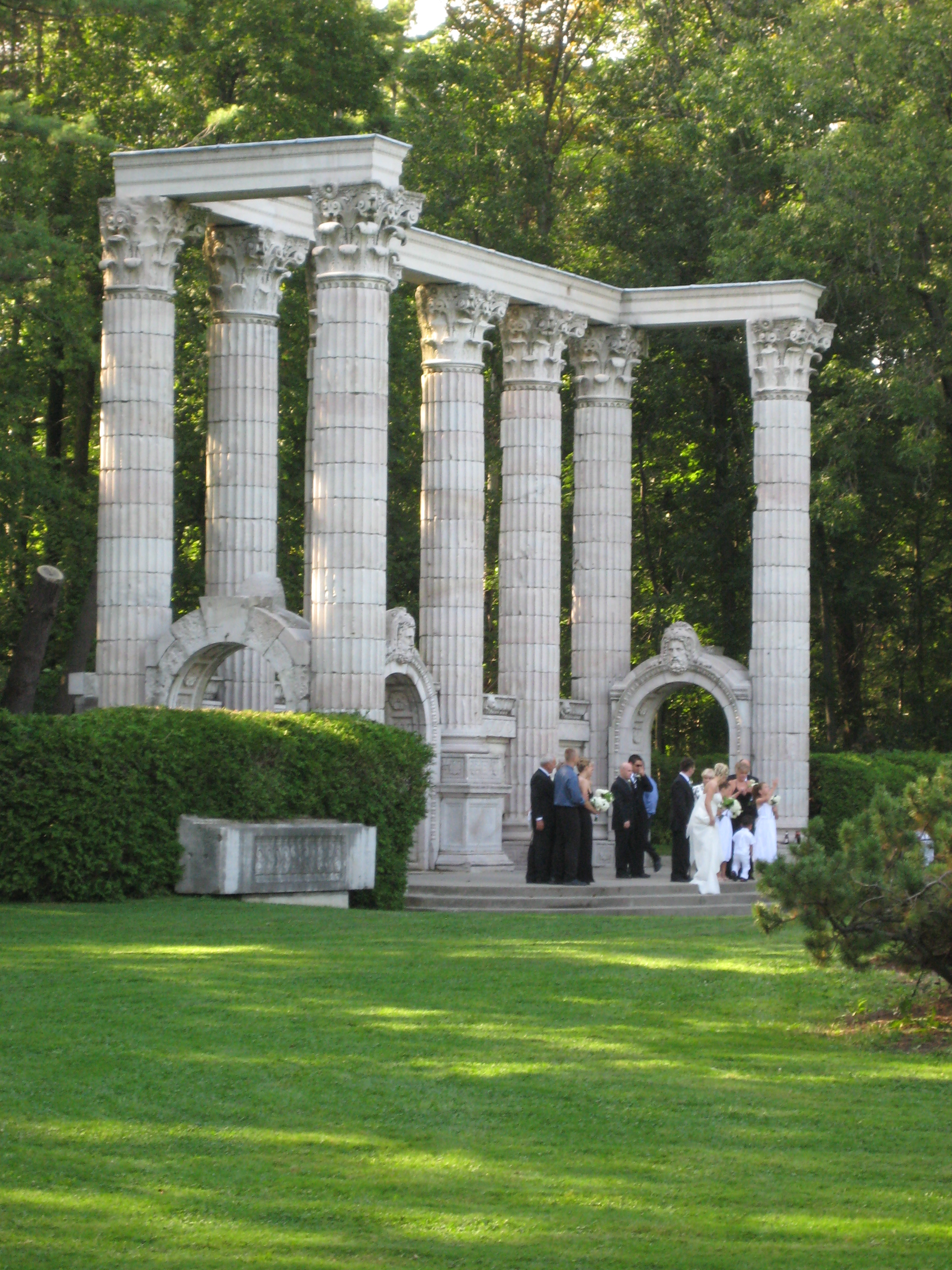
A wedding party at the Greek Stage

In 1934, the Clarks bought Corycliff, a house on five acres of property near the Bluffs, from the artist Rody Kenny Courtice. Over time, the Clarks bought surrounding farms. The property eventually amounted to 500 acres (200 ha), bounded by Lake Ontario to Kingston Road, and from Livingston Road to Galloway Road.

As more people were attracted to the artistic community on the bluffs, the Clarks made additions to the Guild in 1941 and 1942, after which the Government of Canada leased the property as a base for the Women's Royal Naval Service, called HMCS Bytown II, and following the conclusion of hostilities in Europe, retained it until 1947 as Scarborough Hall, a hospital for the treatment of nervous disorders in military personnel.

The house was returned to the Clarks, who restored it to its pre-war functions. However, six years later the couple were forced by rising property taxes to sell 400 acres (1.6 km^{2}) of their land to developers. Spencer Clark oversaw the planning of the area that would become Guildwood Village. After the demolition of New Fort York, Spencer Clark arranged for the transfer of the barracks' gates to the intersection of Kingston Road and Guildwood Parkway, the entrance to Guildwood Village.

On the remaining 90 acres (360,000 m^{2}) around the Guild itself, the Clarks continued collecting and adding to their array of architectural remnants, as Victorian, Beaux-Arts, and Gothic Revival buildings throughout the city were pulled down to make way for Toronto's post-war growth and new attitudes towards planning. Altogether, pieces of more than 60 structures were amassed, from buildings such as the Toronto Bank Building and the home of Sir Frederick Banting, as well as various pieces of artwork, including 14 by Sorel Etrog. The Guild Inn proved so popular as a lakeside resort and artisans' community that in 1965 a six storey, 100 room addition and a swimming pool were added, plus further renovations in 1968.

In 1978, the Government of Ontario and Metropolitan Toronto (Metro) purchased the Guild Inn and property for CA$8.2 million and continued its operation as a hotel. Spencer Clark continued to run the Inn until 1984 when Metro formed a Board of Management was formed to oversee operations. At the time, the Metropolitan Toronto and Region Conservation Authority was given control over the park lands and Bluffs frontage. Clark himself had overseen shoreline protection measures and the Conservation Authority was to preserve and manage those. Delta Hotels was contracted to manage the hotel. Clark died in 1986 and CN Hotels was approached in 1987 to take over the property. In 1988, CN Hotels was sold, and their lease was not renewed.

In 1988, Giant Step Realty signed a 99-year lease on the Inn. Giant Step had big plans for the site, including the conversion from 96 rooms to 437 rooms, removal of mature forest and architectural remnants. A new west wing was planned to be ten stories with 204 suites, a cultural centre and a conference centre. Guildwood Parkway would have to be widened to four lanes. The plan was strongly opposed by the Guildwood Village Community Association. Metro Toronto and Scarborough rejected the plan, rejecting the zoning amendment needed for it to proceed. In 1993, Giant Step closed the Inn after neglecting the gardens and Inn. Metro Toronto Parks took over and Ifield Hotel Association took over management.

In 1999, the park was designated a heritage property by the Heritage Canada Foundation.

The inn's fortunes declined. By 2001, the hotel and restaurant were closed, leaving only the park remaining open to the public, while new tenants were sought. A non-profit group called Artscape approached the city with a proposed strategy for a cultural precinct on the Guild Inn site, which was met with interest.

More concrete plans came, however, in September 2008, when the city approved a plan by Centennial College to operate a hotel, restaurant, and conference centre on the site for use in the school's hospitality courses, as well as to act as a location to house the college's Cultural and Heritage Institute. Though a fire on December 25, 2008 destroyed The Studio, preparations for Centennial's development continued, and the city in January 2009 approved the demolition of the hotel tower. Centennial College eventually abandoned the plan to renovate the Inn as too costly. A second plan proposed by Centennial College to demolish the inn and build student housing was rejected.

In 2011, The Guild's iconic Greek Stage was the back setting for Canadian rapper Drake’s lead single from his sophomore album, "Take Care".

In 2013, the Toronto Star reported that the park was in a state of decay with sculptures eroding and some plaques missing. The Heritage Canada Foundation characterized the park's situation as one of "demolition by neglect". A volunteer group, Friends of Guild Park and Gardens, was formed that year with a goal to protect the park and inn. That year, the City of Toronto approved the selection of Dynamic Hospitality and Entertainment Group to design, build, finance and operate a new restaurant and banquet/event centre at the Guild Inn site.

In 2014, the City of Toronto developed a management plan for the hotel, park and gardens. While this was done, the development proposal was under review. This completed in 2015 and it was announced that the Guild Inn would re-open as a special events venue operated by Dynamic Hospitality and Entertainment Group Inc. under the terms of a forty-year lease of the property. The original hotel would be renovated and two new "event spaces" would be added. The project was expected to cost CA$16 million, with CA$5 million coming from the City of Toronto. The project demolished two wings of the Guild Inn and refurbished the original central block. The refurbished building and meeting venue opened in May 2017.

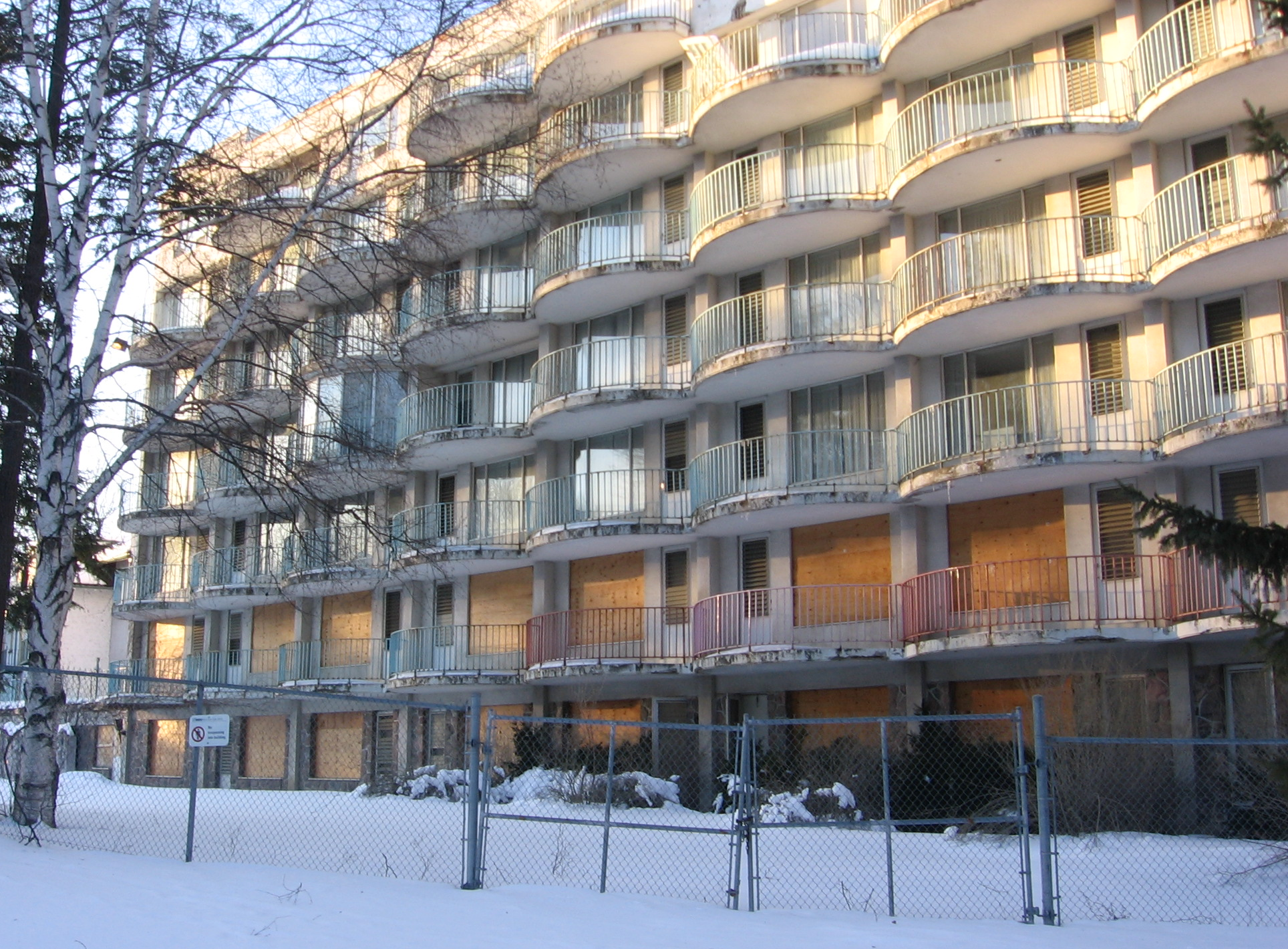
The demolished 1965 hotel block extension to the Guild Inn.

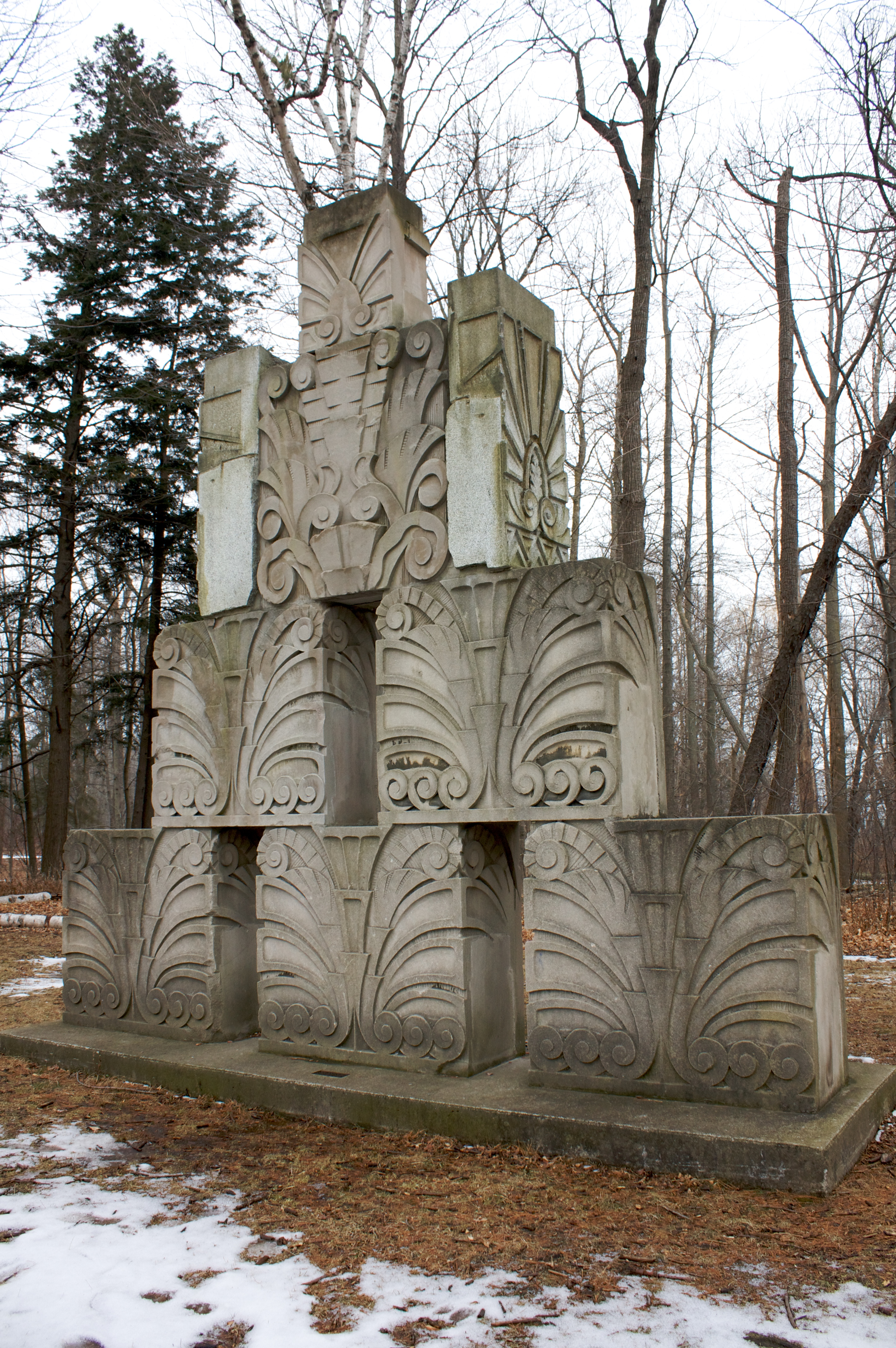
Some ruins of Toronto Star building

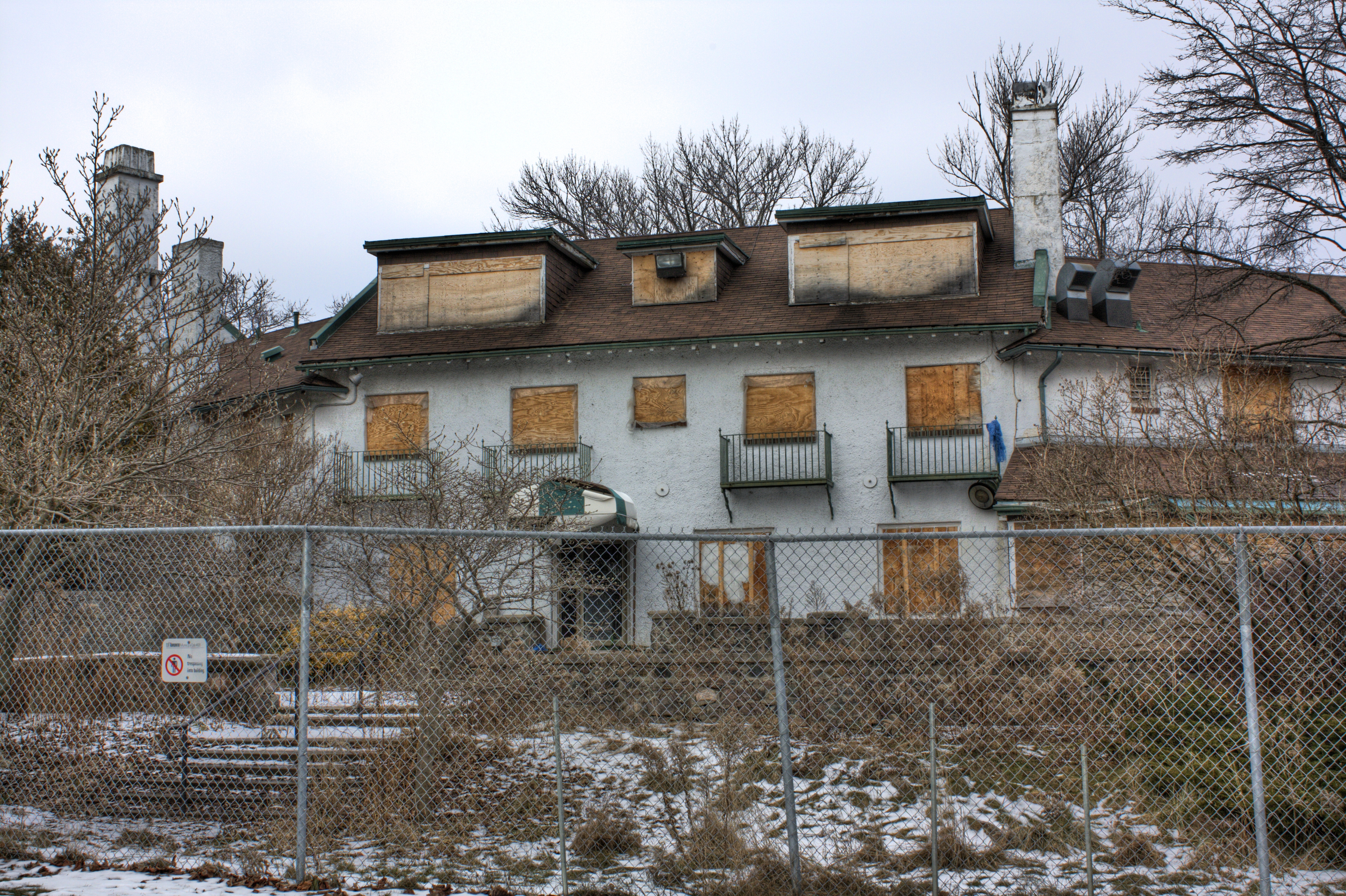
The hotel prior to refurbishment

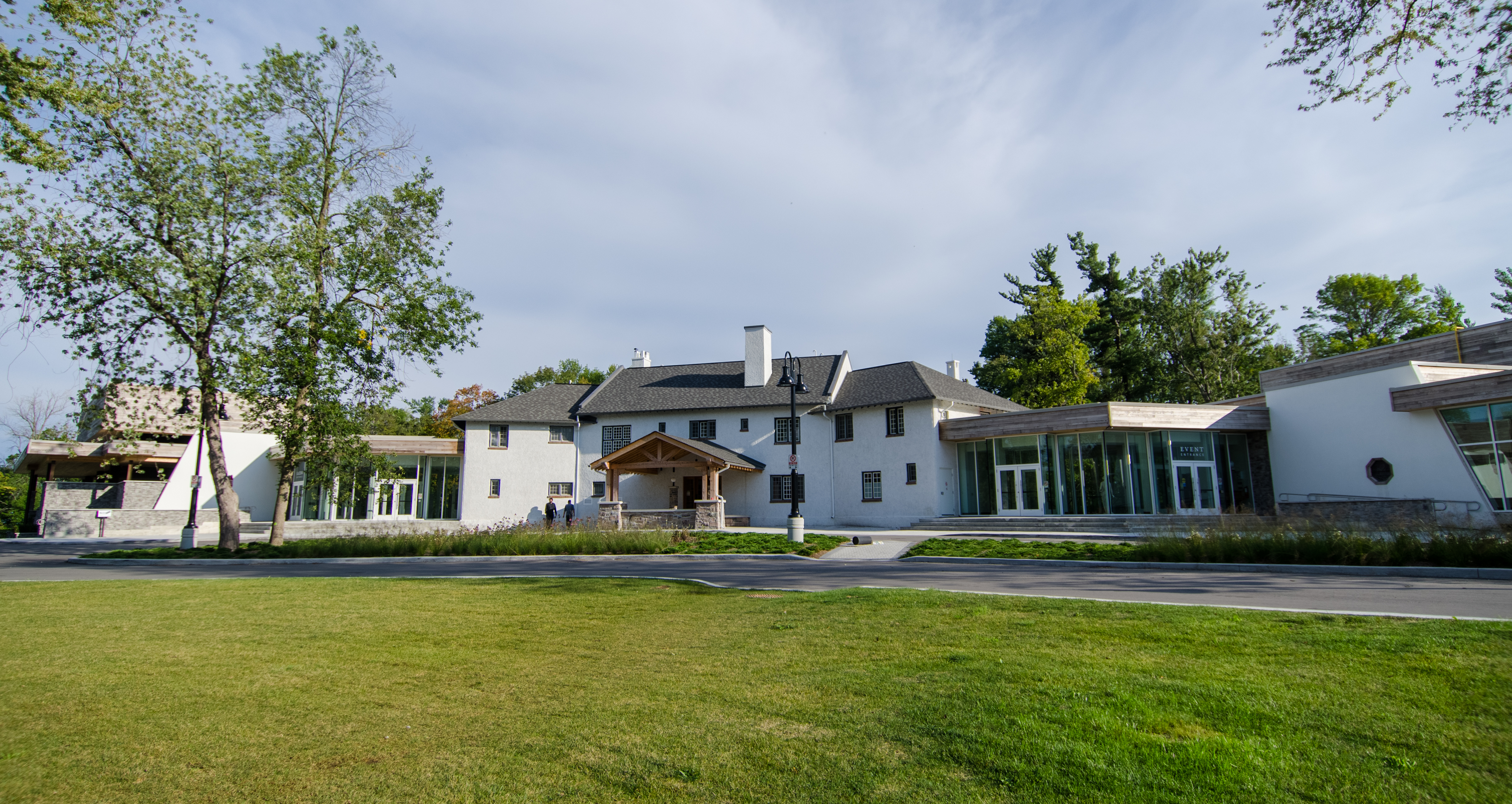
Meeting facility incorporating the restored Guild Inn.

== Guild Park and Gardens ==
Spencer Clark was aware of the trend to rebuild the financial core of Toronto. He, along with stonemason Arthur Hibberd, brought fragments of the demolished buildings, each an example of stone work that was no longer in vogue to the grounds, developing the Spencer Clark Collection of Historic Architecture. Fragments from over 60 buildings were installed on The Guild's grounds. One highlight is the Greek Stage, using eight columns from the Bank of Toronto Building to make a classical outdoor stage at a cost of CA$300 thousand to Spencer Clark. Named the Greek Theatre, the stage is used for outdoor theatre performances. It hosted its first performance in 1984 of folk music by the Good Time Rolling Folk Music Medicine Show.

On the park grounds, exists an 1800s-era log cabin, known as the Osterhout Log Cabin. The actual date of its construction is unknown. In 1795, surveyor Augustus Jones and his surveying team camped in the area and could have built a log cabin on the property while he surveyed Scarborough. However, Jones' accounts stated that they stayed in tents. In 1805, the property was granted to William Osterhout, but there is no record of a log cabin during the time Osterhout lived on the property. The property was later owned by Alexander McDonnell, Duncan Cameron, and John Ewart. James Humphreys bought the property in 1845, and his son and family are the first recorded residents in the cabin, in 1861. The property was bought by the Clarks in 1934. As part of the 1978 sale of the Guild property, the land around the cabin came under the administration of the Conservation Authority. In 1980, Scarborough designated the cabin as the Osterhout Cabin, and granted it protected heritage status. Some test pits were dug around the cabin in 1994 to determine its age.

The grounds formerly were the site of three cottages, the Corycliff house, and The Studio, all used by the Guild's artists. These were lost to neglect, vandalism, and natural deterioration. The remaining Sculpture Studio, the Osterhout Log Cabin, the Guild Office building and the Guild Inn itself are all designated heritage buildings.
