= William H. Wright Building =

Coordinates: 43°38′57″N 79°22′46″W

General information
- Address: 140 King Street West
- Town or city: Toronto, Ontario
- Opened: 1937
- Closed: 1974
- Owner: The Globe and Mail

Technical details
- Floor count: 6

Design and construction
- Architect(s): Alvan Mathers
- Architecture firm: Mathers & Haldenby

The William H. Wright Building was a six-storey office building in Toronto, Ontario. Designed by the firm Mathers and Haldenby and built between 1937 and 1938, it was one of Toronto's best examples of streamline moderne architecture. The building was home to The Globe and Mail newspaper and was named after the founder of that paper, William Henry Wright (1876–1951). In 1974 it was demolished to make way for the new Exchange Tower.

== History ==
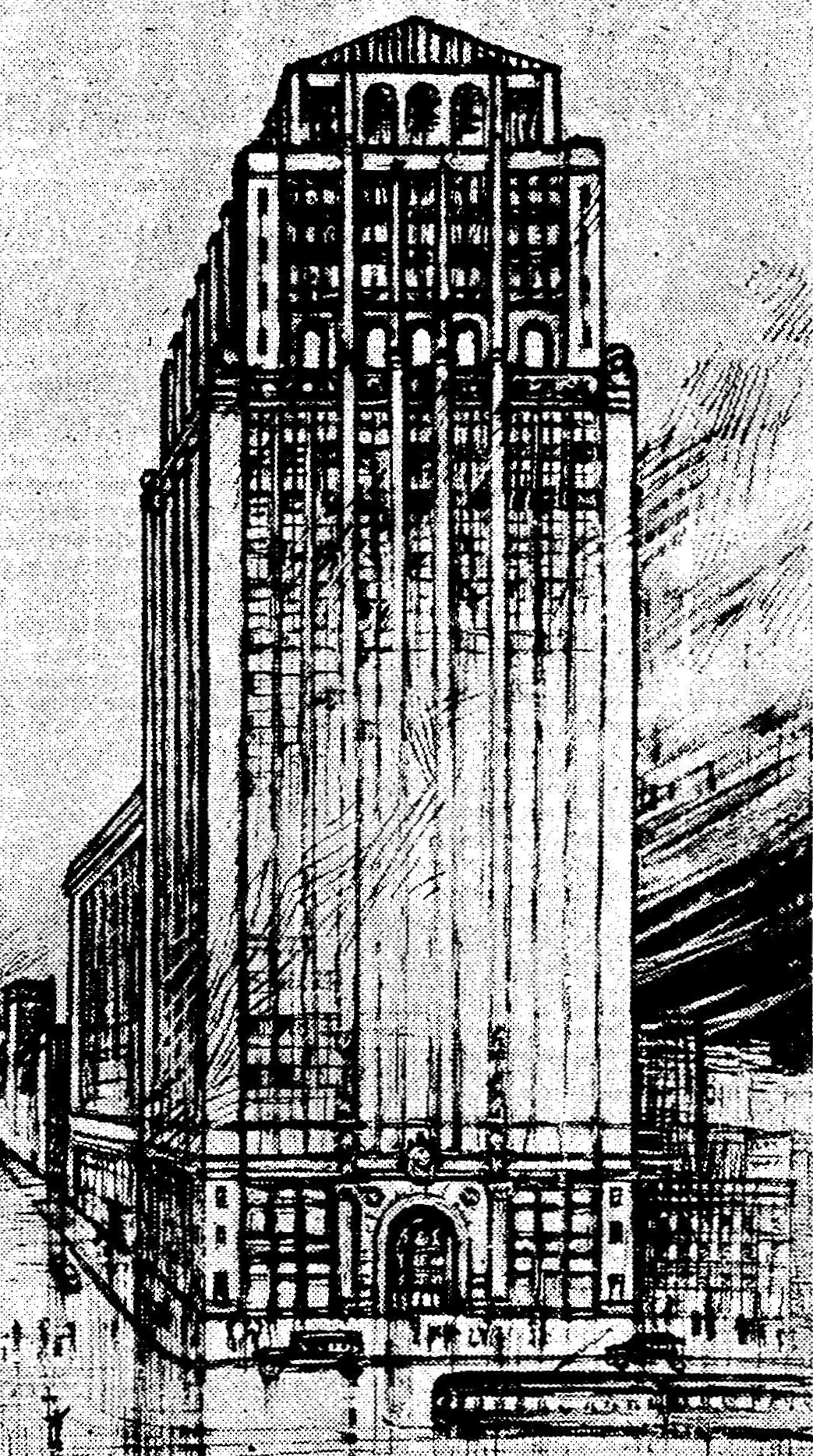
In 1927, the Mail and Empire planned a new building on the site, designed by Herbert J. Duerr and Earle L. Sheppard. The project failed to materialise.

The main door of the original building was retained and installed at The Globe and Mail's subsequent home on Front Street. Additional sculptural elements from the structure may be found at Guild Park and Gardens in Scarborough. The street address once occupied by the 1937 Globe and Mail Building is part of the First Canadian Place complex and is now occupied by the Exchange Tower. The plans for the William H. Wright Building are held at the Archives of Ontario as part of the Mathers and Haldenby fonds.
