= Guild Park and Gardens =

Public park and building stonework conservatory in Toronto, Canada

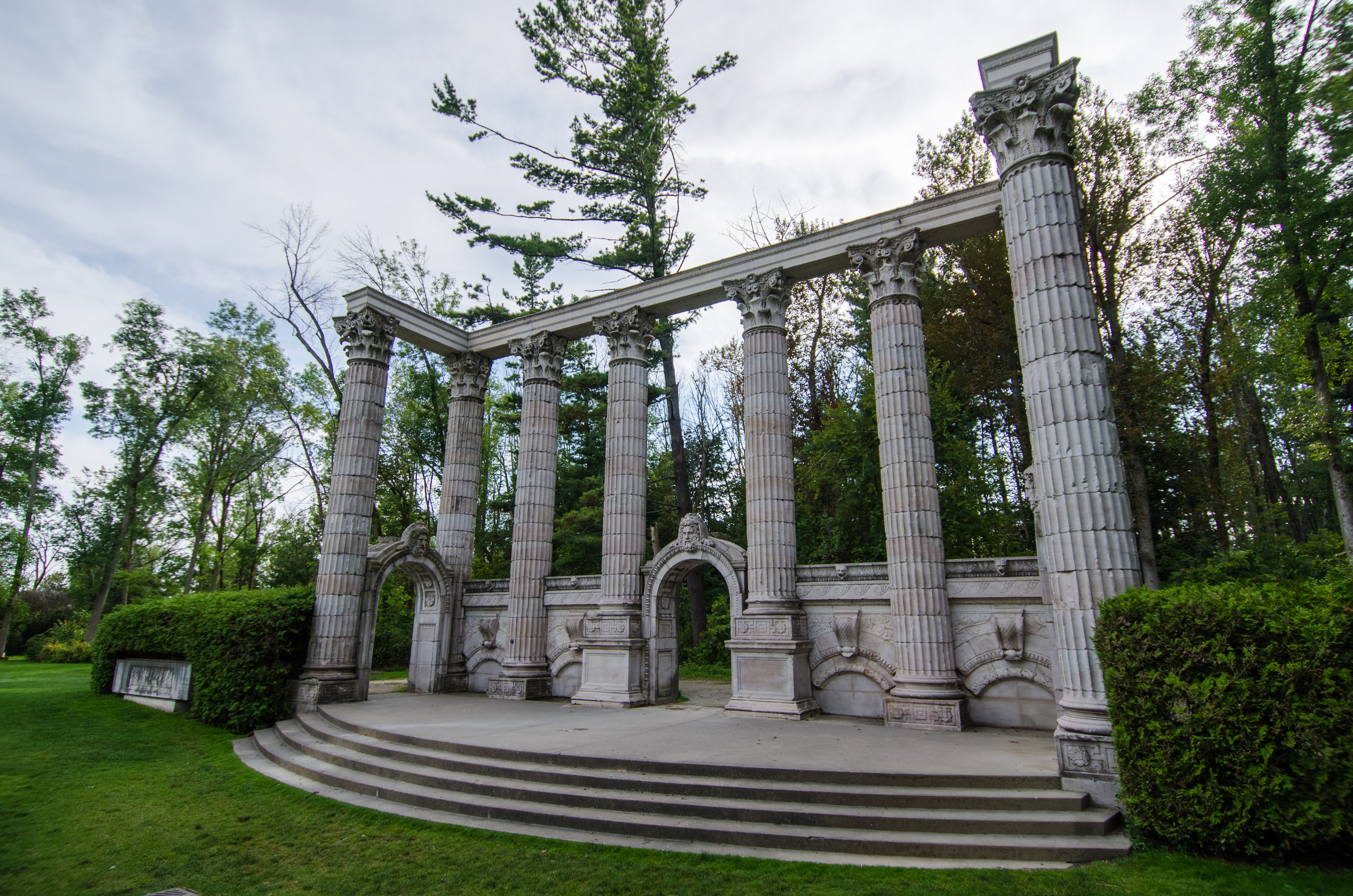
- The Greek Theatre at Guild Park and Gardens

- Location within Toronto
- Type: Urban park
- Location: 201 Guildwood Parkway; Toronto, Ontario; M1P 4N7
- Coordinates: 43°44′49″N 79°11′30″W
- Area: 50 acres (20 ha)
- Created: 1978
- Owner: Toronto and Region Conservation Authority
- Operator: Toronto Parks, Forestry & Recreation
- Website: Guild Park and Gardens

Guild Park and Gardens is a public park in the Scarborough district of Toronto, Ontario, Canada. The park was formerly the site of an artist colony and is notable for its collection of relics saved from the demolition of buildings primarily in downtown Toronto arranged akin to ancient ruins. Located on the Scarborough Bluffs, Guild Park and Gardens has an outdoor Greek stage and a 19th-century log cabin among the oldest in Toronto. The principal building in the park is the Guild Inn, a former inn and estate mansion.

The park is located on Guildwood Parkway, east of Eglinton Avenue East and Kingston Road. Its 50 acres (20 ha) is accessed from the Guild Inn's own parking lots and from a parking lot for the Lake Ontario access trail, just to the east. The park is mostly forested. South of the Inn is a large area of grassy, open space. To the east, a ravine leads down from Guildwood Parkway to Lake Ontario. Along the bluffs, an east–west trail connects to Livingston Road to the west, with several points for viewing the lake. The edges of the bluffs are roped off for safety, as the bluffs are tall and composed of soft, sandy, unstable material.

== History ==
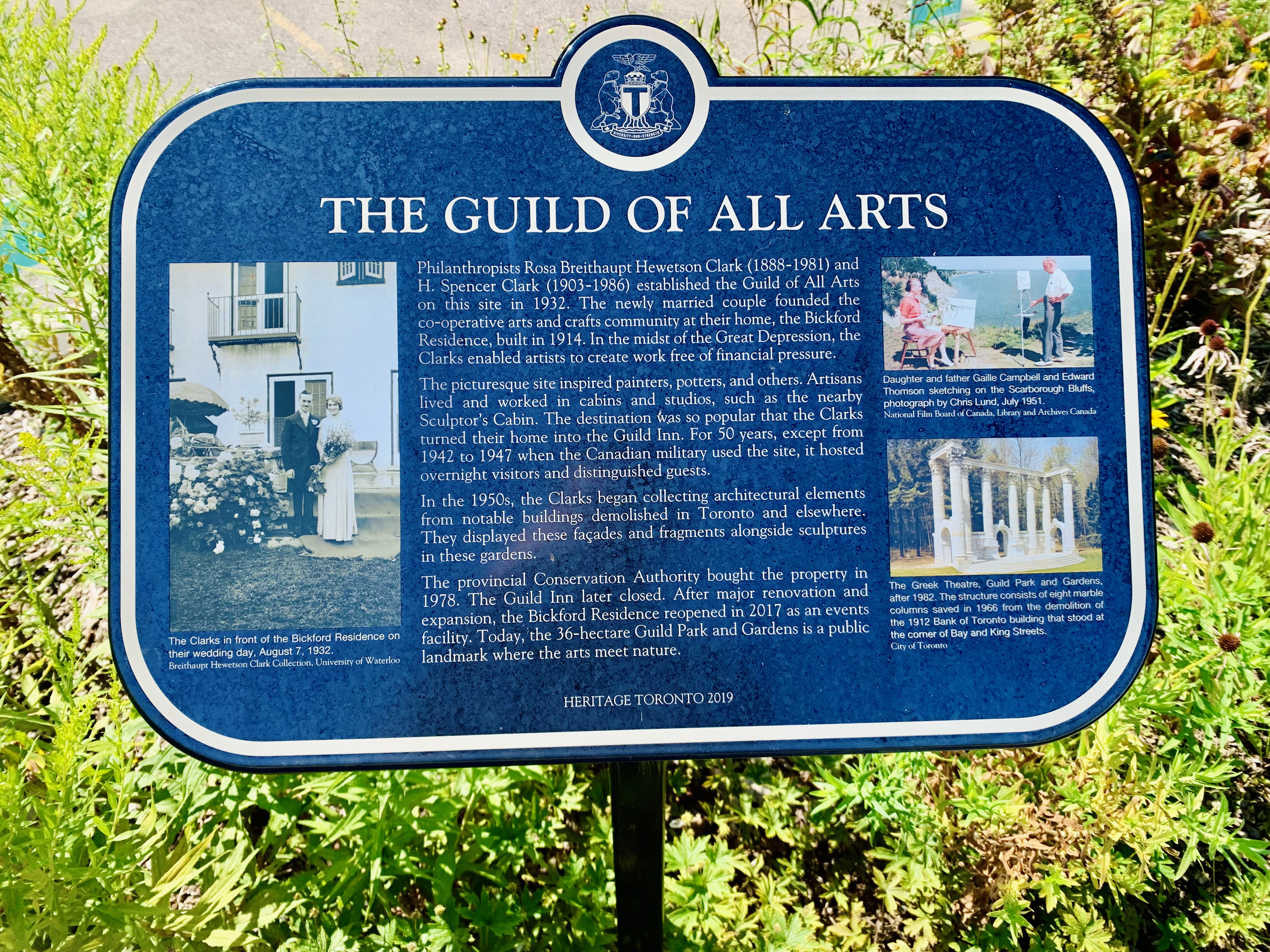
The Guild Of All Arts Toronto Heritage plaque

In 1796, the land became part of Scarborough Township, set up by the British colony of Upper Canada. The land was known to have been used at that time by Governor Simcoe for surveying the new township. It was granted to the Oosterhut family who farmed the site. In the 1850s, the log cabin was built, and is the only evidence of settlement. The property became the "Ranelagh Park" estate of Col. Harold Bickford, then it became the China Mission Seminary, and the "Cliff Acres" estate of Richard Look, before it was bought in 1932 by Rosa Hewetson, who, along with her husband Spencer Clark converted it to "The Guild of all Arts" artists' colony and inn. During World War II and for a period afterward, it was used by the Government of Canada. The main building on the estate became the "Guild Inn", managed by the Clarks, and artists stayed in residence at the log cabin and several cottages on the property.

South of the main building, the Clarks built a garden leading to the bluffs. Starting in the 1950s, the Clarks started collecting remnants of buildings in Toronto, as they were being demolished. What interested the Clarks were examples of artistic sculptures, reliefs and examples of building craft that adorned the old buildings. These were deposited in the garden south of the Inn, some as 'follies'. The Bank of Toronto headquarters contributed greatly to the collection. Its columns and arches and various architectural pieces were arranged to make the "Greek Theatre", an outdoor performance space using the remnants to adorn the backdrop of the stage. Notable Canadian sculptors had contributed relief sculptures of each province and territory to adorn the Bank of Montreal Toronto headquarters, and these were saved for display. Several pieces created by artists in residence also have been installed in the garden.

It became a park after the Guild Inn and its property was bought by Metropolitan Toronto and the Government of Ontario in 1978 from Rosa Hewetson Clark and Spencer Clark. The Inn continued to operate until it closed in 2001. It was first managed by the Clarks and management transitioned after their passing to various hotel management companies, including Delta Hotels, Canadian National Railway and others. Today, the park is managed by Toronto Parks, on land that is the property of the Toronto and Region Conservation Authority.

From the 1990s onwards, the property was the subject of several redevelopment proposals, which failed or were rejected. The City of Toronto government developed a management plan in 2014 for the park and gardens. The plan intends to preserve the park, protect the forest, bluffs and lakeshore, and maintain the heritage buildings (inn and cabin). The inn was restored, part of a new facility for weddings, meetings and gatherings. One new wing (the 'Event' space) is a banquet hall. Another new wing (the 'Gazebo') includes meeting rooms.

Another building, used for storage and offices by the Clarks, was expanded to three storeys and now houses the Clark Centre for the Arts. It has programs of art classes and artist exhibits. A boardwalk trail has been installed in the forested part of the property to the west.

== Relics ==
In the late 1950s and later, older buildings in downtown Toronto were being torn down and replaced. Many of these had been standing for many decades and had been well-constructed, with stonework of a high quality and were considered historic to many. A movement to support the preservation of older buildings began in response to the amount of demolition, but it would not be until the 1970s that governments would pass laws that protected buildings considered to have 'heritage' status. Rosa and Spencer Clark responded to this wholesale demolition by taking away remnants of the buildings from the demolition sites. They enlisted engineers, architects and hired stonemason Arthur Hibberd, and erected the remnants in the Guild gardens. Remnants of over 60 buildings from Toronto and elsewhere in Ontario exist in the Guild gardens, the front gate of the Guild Inn, and the front gate of the Guildwood Village neighbourhood.

=== The "Greek" Theatre ===
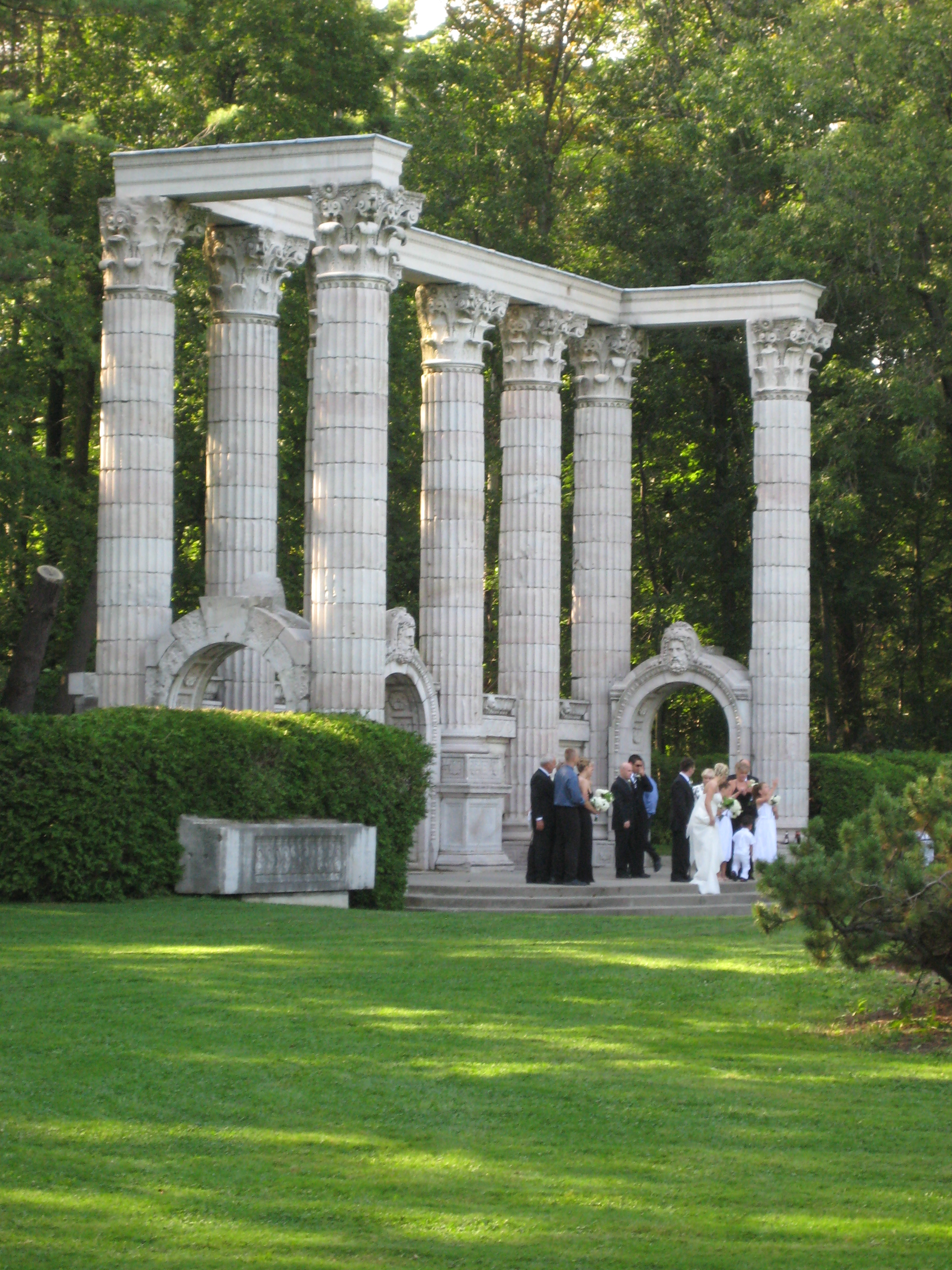
The Greek Theatre is an open-air theatre, built from the remnants of a Bank of Toronto.

To commemorate the 50th anniversary of the Guild Inn, the Clarks built an open-air theatre from remnants of the Bank of Toronto building, at a cost of CA$300,000 to Spencer Clark. The Bank of Toronto building had stood at Bay and King Streets in downtown Toronto since 1912, until 1966, when the Toronto-Dominion Centre was built. Eight marble columns, plus Corinthian capitals and arches were repurposed along with a concrete stage and steps to form an open-air theatre under the supervision of Hibberd. There were also plans to build an amphitheatre in front of the stage, but it has not been built. Seating is either on the grass or using chairs.

The theatre hosted its first performance in 1984 of folk music by the Good Time Rolling Folk Music Medicine Show. From 1998 to 2003, The Gardens and Greek Theatre at The Guild Inn was home to Cliffhanger Productions theatre company, which specialized in adaptations of world mythology for family audiences. From 2011-present, the site has been home to Guild Festival Theatre which presents plays, concerts and other live events at the Greek Theatre.

=== List of relics ===
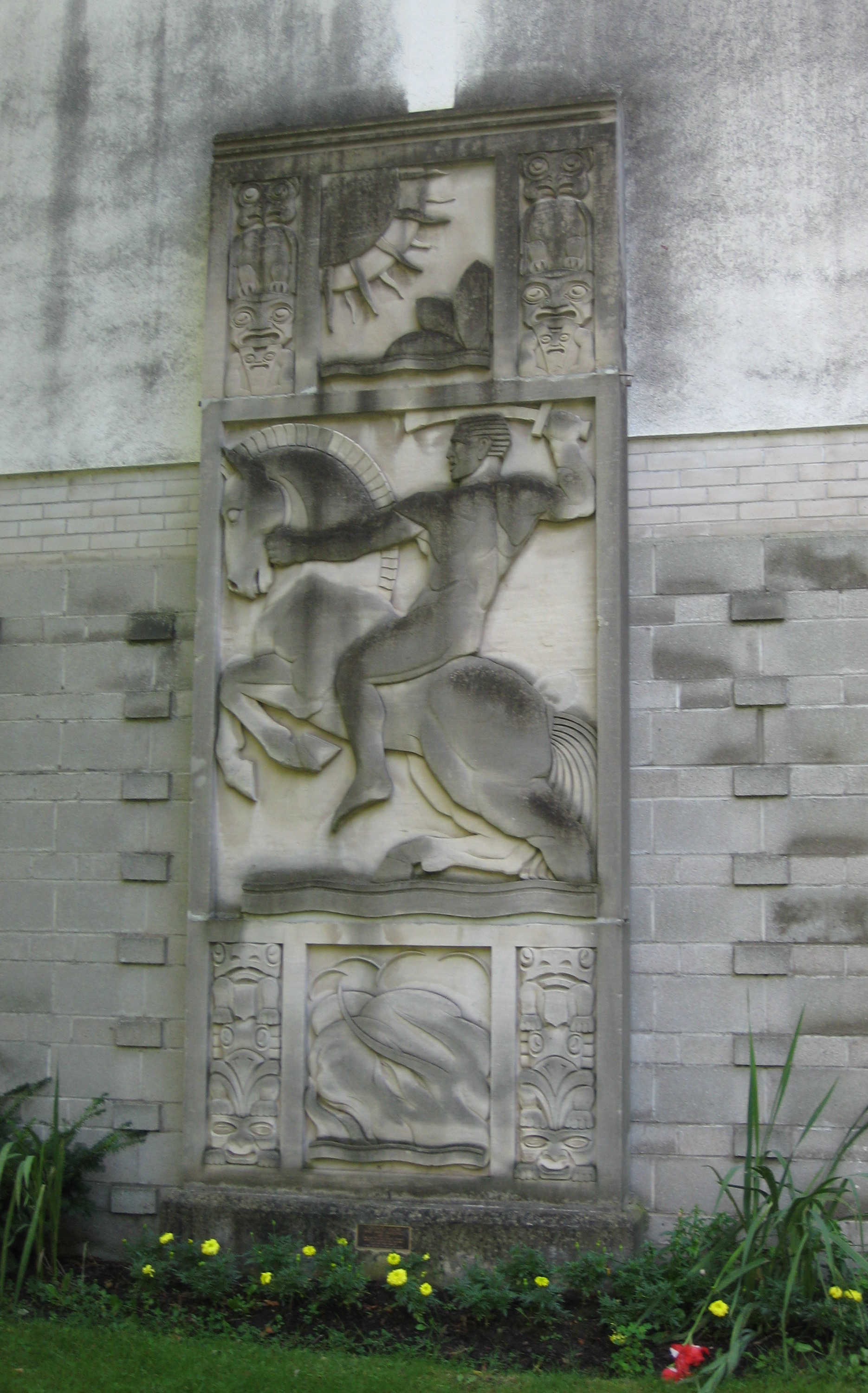
Stonework from the William H. Wright Building, one of many architectural relics display at the park.

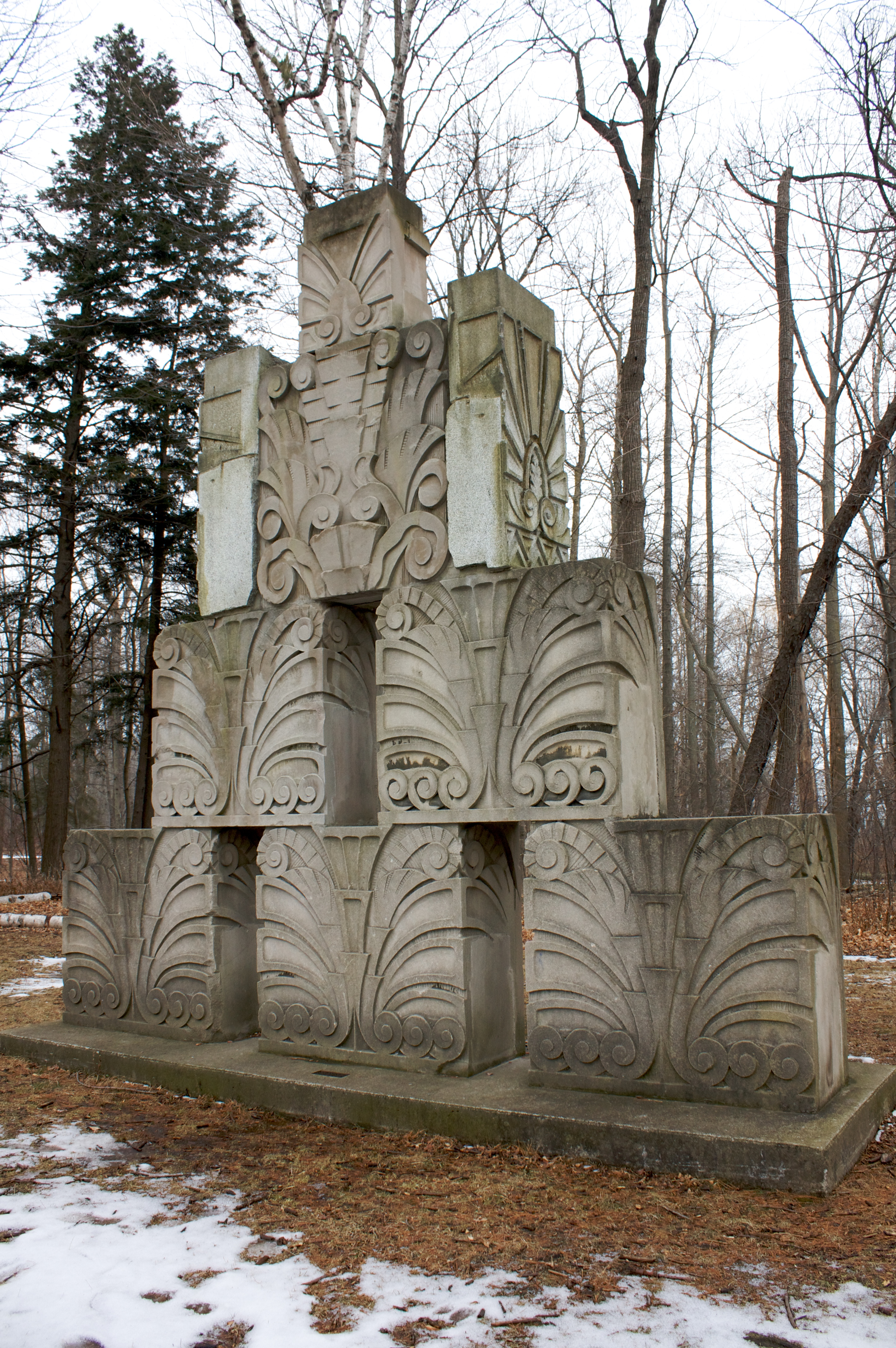
Relics at the park may be arranged in different patterns, such as the relics from the Old Toronto Star Building.

- Abitibi Paper Building (1930)
  - three Ionic capitals
- Bankers Bond Building (1920)
  - four Ionic capitals and columns
- Bank of Montreal Building (1937–1948)
  - Animal Panels - six limestone panels depicting various animals, designed by Jacobine Jones
  - Panels of the Provinces - twelve panels for each of the provinces and two territories, topped by a filial from the entrance gate to Victoria Park in Niagara Falls.
- Bank of Nova Scotia, 39 King Street West (1903)
  - exterior entrance
  - stone carvings
  - columns
- Bank of Toronto building (1912)
  - columns
  - eight columns, arches and other pieces used for Greek Theatre
  - entrance
  - crest panels (Enterprise, Architecture, Toronto coat of arms)
- Banting House (1928)
  - mantelpiece
- Burlington Arcade, London, England
  - swan sculpture
- Canadian Bank of Commerce Building (1899)
  - art nouveau sandstone carvings
- Gibson House, Rosedale
  - wrought-iron gates in gateway to Bluffs
- Goldie Mill, Galt (1860)
  - grindstone
- Granite Club (1926)
  - main entrance including two fluted columns
- Imperial Bank of Canada, 2 Bloor St West (1928)
  - stone entrance, including fluted columns and pediment
- Imperial Oil Headquarters, 92 King Street East
  - cornerstone
- R. H. King Collegiate
  - boys' entrance
- Long Sault Canal
  - limestone blocks
- North American Life Insurance Building (1932)
  - two panels of angels
- O'Keefe Brewery (1840)
  - keystone
- Ontario Legislative Building (1892)
  - original finial from west gable
- Osgoode Hall (1829)
  - original stone steps
- O'Sullivan's Corner School / Victoria Park School (1873)
  - belfry and bell
- Oxford University Press, 480 University (1929)
  - doorway pediment
- Produce Exchange Building (1890)
  - piers and turrets in gateway to Bluffs
- Provincial Paper Ltd. Building (1930)
  - pineapple filial
  - pediment
- Quebec Bank (1912)
  - stone carvings (mounted on reverse of Bank of Nova Scotia carvings)
- Richmond Building, London, ON (1881)
  - stone bas relief carvings
- Registry of Deeds and Land Titles (1915)
  - column and Ionic capital
- Rosedale residence (1948)
  - two limestone columns with Corinthian capitals
- Sherbourne Street row housing (1870s)
  - two polished granite columns on red sandstone bases
- Sunnyside boardwalk (1920s)
  - lighting on front gate of Inn property
- Temple Building (1895)
  - entrance and panels - red New Brunswick sandstone
- Toronto Globe and Mail Building (1938)
  - carved limestone panels
- Toronto Armories (1894)
  - stone margurette
- Toronto Conservatory of Music Building (1897)
  - copper bas-reliefs of Healey Willan and Ernest MacMillan
  - two entrance headers
- Toronto Engine House No. 2 (1871)
  - front sign (brick)
- Toronto Star Building (1929)
  - art deco limestone blocks
  - art deco granite panels
- University College (1857)
  - two window wells
- University of Toronto Medical Building (1904)
  - two terra-cotta Ionic columns
- Unspecified mill, Kingston
  - grind stone

Sources: Lidgold, Walker

According to Walker 1982, one of the entrances to the T. Eaton Co. Ltd College Street store was saved and taken to the Guild in 1976. Various other pieces of stone, marble and terra-cotta were also taken to the Guild by Clark. However, they remain un-erected.

== Sculptures ==
- Ravenna by Sorel Etrog
- Space plough by Sorel Etrog
- Mobius Curve by Michael Clay
- Musidora below Imperial Bank entrance
- Horse's Head by Emanuel Hahn
- Solstice by Kosso Eloul
- Bear by E.B. Cox and Michael Clay
- Robert Holmes by John Byers
- Chrysalides by Antoine Poncet

Source: Lidgold

== Structures ==
=== Osterhout Cabin ===
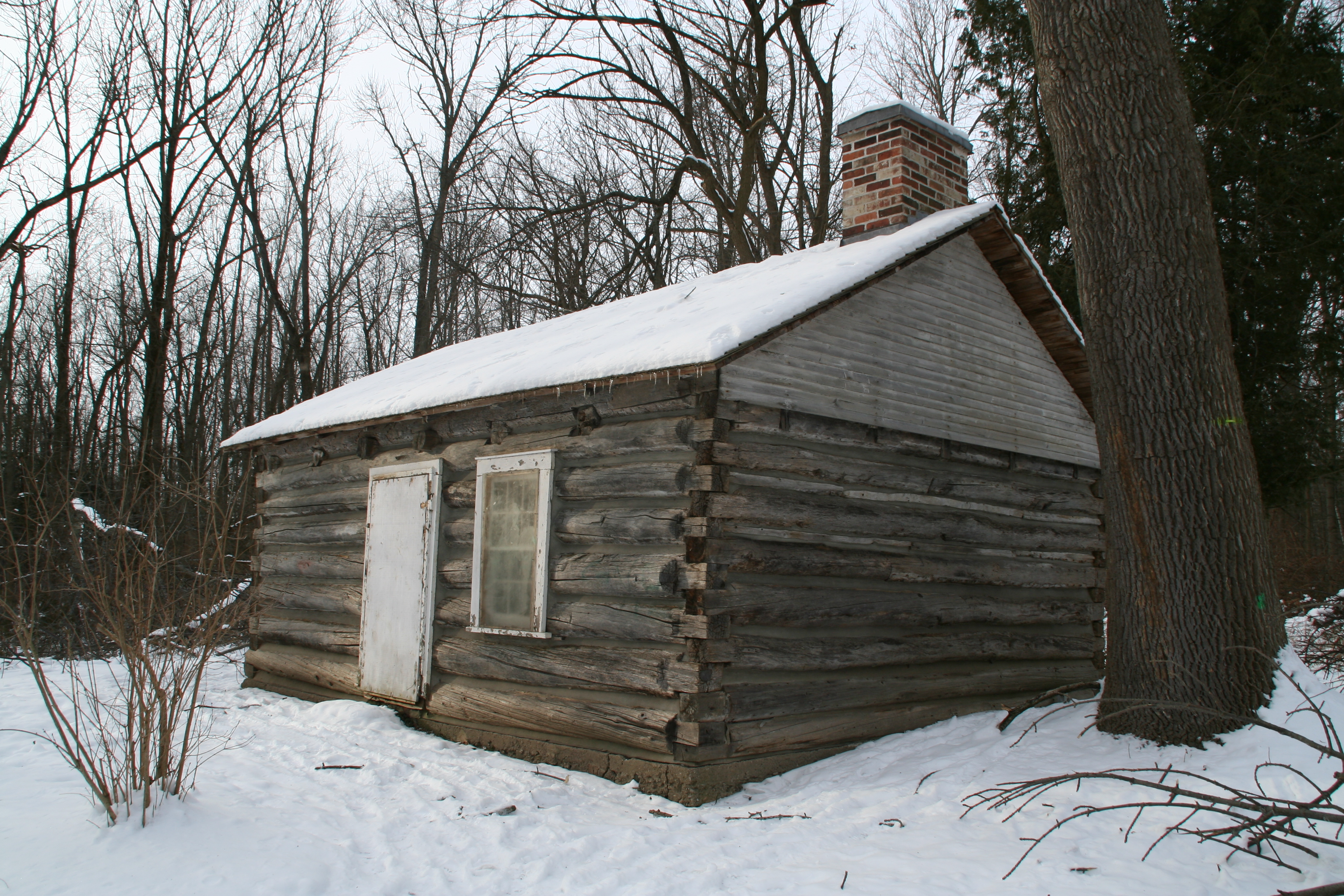
To the west of the Guild Inn property exists Osterhout Log Cabin, one of the oldest buildings in Toronto.

To the west of the Guild Inn property exists an 1800s-era log cabin, known as the Osterhout Log Cabin. The actual date of its construction is unknown. In 1795, surveyor Augustus Jones and his surveying team camped in the area and could have built a log cabin on the property while he surveyed Scarborough. However, Jones' accounts stated that they stayed in tents. In 1805, the property was granted to William Osterhout, but there is no record of a log cabin during the time Osterhout lived on the property. The property was later owned by Alexander McDonnell, Duncan Cameron, and John Ewart. James Humphreys bought the property in 1845, and his son and family are the first recorded residents in the cabin, in 1861. The property was bought by the Clarks in 1934.

As part of the 1978 sale of the Guild property, the land around the cabin came under the administration of the Conservation Authority. In 1980, Scarborough designated the cabin as the Osterhout Cabin, and granted it protected heritage status. Some test pits were dug around the cabin in 1994 to determine its age. Artist Elizabeth Fraser Williamson used the cabin as a studio from 1970 to 1995.

=== Other structures ===
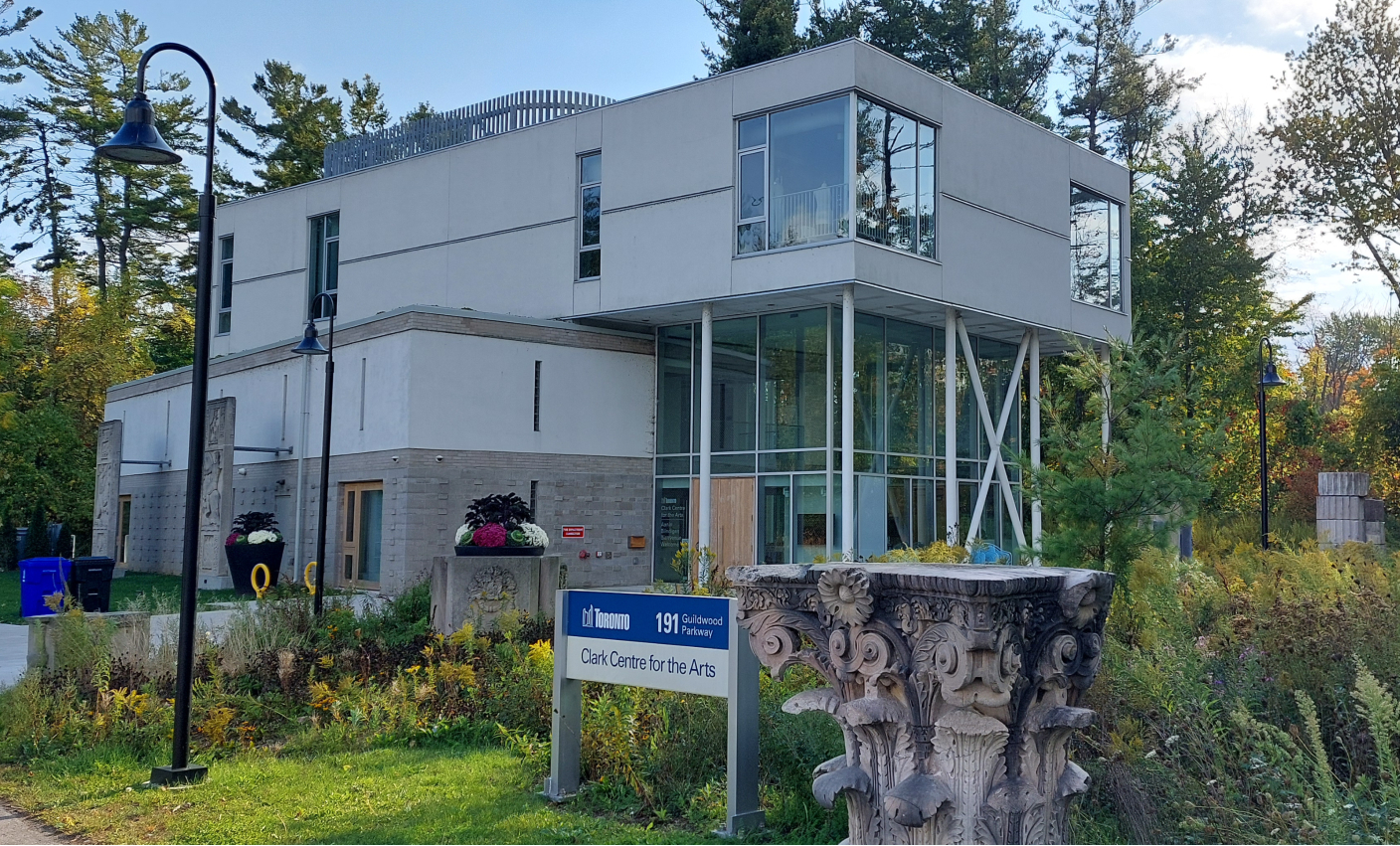
Clark Centre for the Arts building at Guild Park

The following structures are also situated at Guild Park and Gardens:

- Guild Office Building (now the Clark Centre)
- Pottery Kiln
- Sculpture Studio
- Wishing Well
- Smokehouse
- Stone Cutting Machine (donated by Arthur Hibberd)

Source: Lidgold

In addition, the park previously held three cottages, as well as two other buildings, Corycliff, and The Studio.

== In popular culture ==
The park has been used in recent pop culture pieces. Martha and the Muffins filmed the video for "Danseparc" here. The Guild Inn and surrounding area were used in the filming of The Skulls, the Warehouse 13 pilot and "Endless Terror" episodes.

It was also one of the main back settings for Canadian rapper Drake's music video for "Headlines" in 2011.

The 1972 television series The Whiteoaks of Jalna was filmed at the cabin, and appeared in the 1975 film It Seemed Like a Good Idea at the Time. It has also been used for other television projects.

== See also ==
- List of lost buildings and structures in Toronto
