= DMo (artist) =

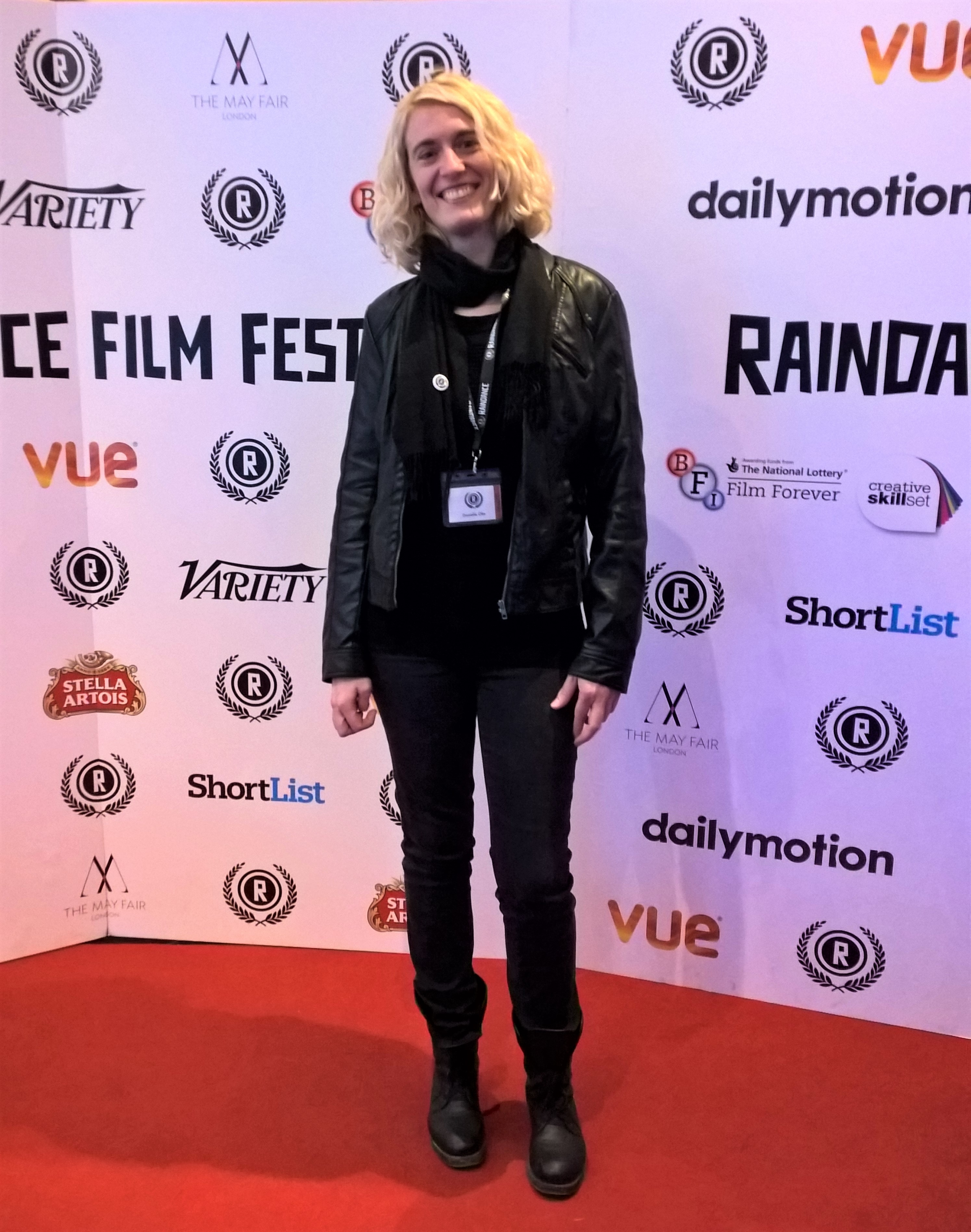
- DMo attending 23rd Raindance Film Festival in London, England in September 2015.

Background information
- Also known as: DMo
- Born: Danielle Megan Oke; Cairns, Queensland, Australia
- Origin: Cairns, Queensland, Australia
- Occupation(s): Artist, writer, director, songwriter
- Years active: 1999–present
- Website: tapdmo.com

Danielle Oke is an Australian English artist, writer, director and songwriter who creates under the artist name DMo. As an artist she has had painting, installation and video art exhibited internationally. In film she has had short films produced as writer or writer/director. As a songwriter she has written songs for independent film soundtracks.

== History ==
=== Early life ===
Danielle Oke was born in Cairns, North East Queensland, Australia to English and Australian parents.

=== Career ===
In 2006 DMo was a freelance writer and researcher for animation studios C.H.A.S.E. London, working on a graphic novel series by Creative Director Robert Chandler, which was a collaboration with TOKYOPOP Los Angeles and HarperCollins Publishers.

Interconnection is a central theme in DMo's work. She started exhibiting her art publicly in small group and solo shows from 2007 onwards. She also began to use her art to help raise funds for charitable causes. One such project was the collaboration with Italian artist Zago for the Emergency (NGO) fundraising project Zago and Your Friends (2011–12).

In 2007 she had her first release as a songwriter for “All You Want”, the theme song for the short film All She Wants To Do produced by Suzanne Baynes / FreeWell Productions (release date 2008). The song went on to be selected into the Garden State Film Festival’s Movie Music Competition 2008.

In 2008 her first video art piece o.r.o.b.o.w. Body Canvas was screened at the 3rd International Urban Screens Conference and Exhibition in Federation Square, Melbourne, Australia. It went on to screen at In a Planet of Our Own – A Vision of Sustainability from across Six Continents / AEC World Expo (2009) at the Indian Institute of Technology Bombay (IITB), Mumbai, India and again in 2010 at the Media Facades Festival at the Collegium Hungaricum Berlin in Germany.

In 2011 DMo penned and performed the track “Let’s Ride” with Dave Newby for the soundtrack of independent feature film Cherries and Clover produced by Pilot Pig Productions (release date 2013).

In 2014 she started collaborating with Swedish sound designer/composer Nicolas Lewentorp on a music experiment project called Cityless, combining her beat poetics, melodies and vocals with his ambient, avant-electronica arrangements. Together they created the beat tracks for DMo's two short films “Wake Up” for Wake Up (2015) and “Something More” for Unnatural Abstractions (2017).

In 2014 her first short film as writer/director Wake Up was produced by Elliot Grove / Raindance Raw Talent. The film screened the following year at the 23rd Raindance Film Festival in London. In 2016 the film was picked up for online distribution by German production company WEP Productions on dailyme TV.

Her second short film as writer/director Unnatural Abstractions was shot in London in 2016.

DMo's films are often told from a subrealist context, exposing internal landscapes of characters via external happenings, locations, action, dialogue and other characters.

Her creative studio is known as The Art Playground aka TAP, expressing her multifaceted artistic practice, and her approach to life.

== Filmography ==
Wake Up (2015) Short (writer, director)

Unnatural Abstractions (2017) Short (writer, director, producer)

Be-Longing (2018) Short (writer)

Dancing Around The World (2018) Video documentary (director, producer, editor)

== Songwriting credits ==
Title	Year	Artist	Album
“All You Want”	2008	Henrique J. Da Silva, Sopan Deb, Alexandra Hampton and Jenna Carra	All She Wants To Do Soundtrack
“Let’s Ride”	2013	DMo	Cherries and Clover Soundtrack
“Wake Up”	2015	DMo	Wake Up Soundtrack
“Something More”	2017	DMo	Unnatural Abstractions Soundtrack
