= Waterloo Spur Line =

Railway line in Canada

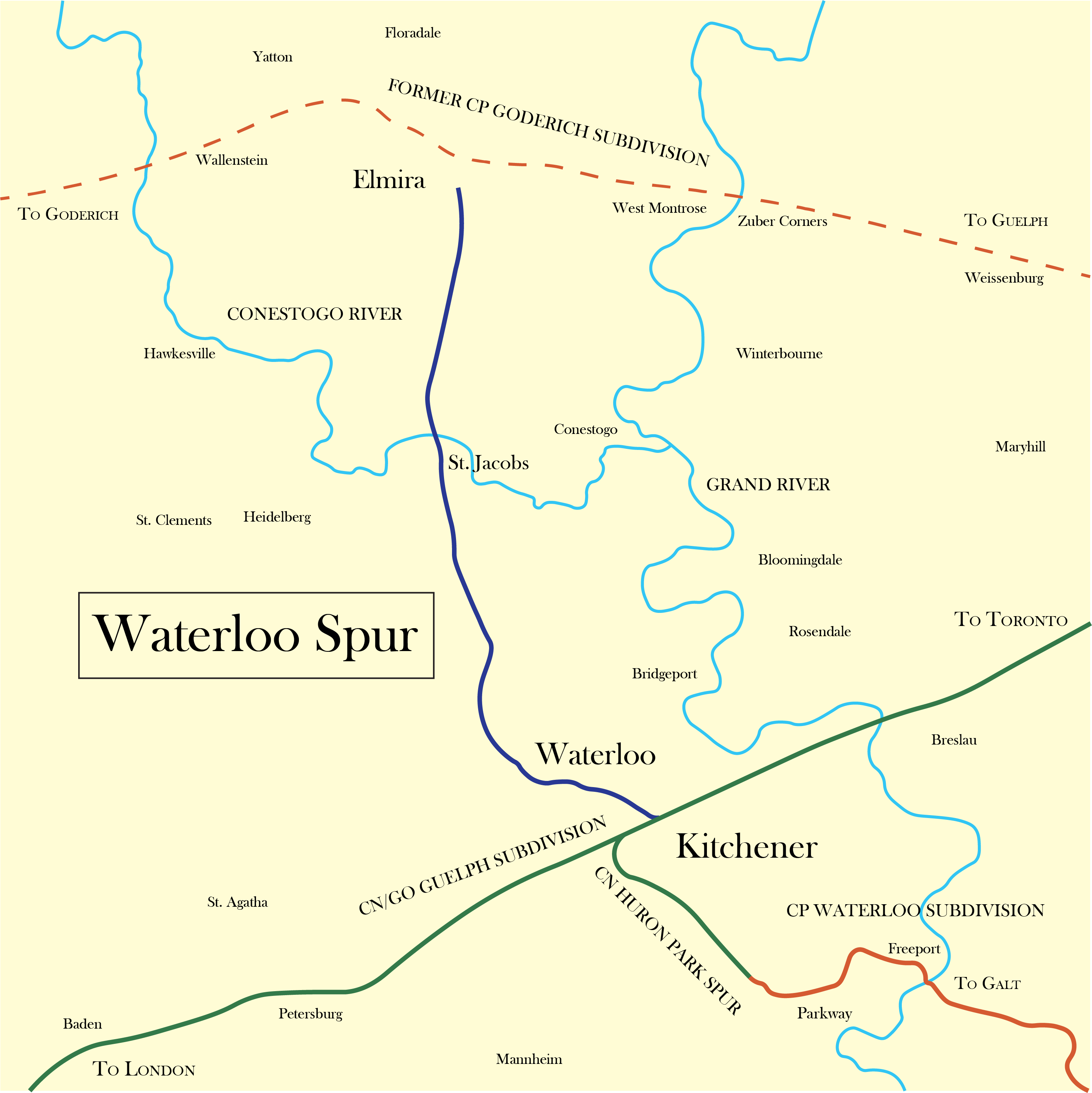

Overview
- Operator: Canadian National Railway (freight service); Waterloo Central Railway and Ion rapid transit (passenger service)
- Headquarters: Waterloo
- Locale: Region of Waterloo, Ontario, Canada
- Dates of operation: 1890–present

Technical
- Track gauge: 1,435 mm (4 ft 8 1/2 in)
- Length: 11.9 miles (19.2 km)

The Waterloo Spur Line is a short line railway in the Region of Waterloo, Ontario, Canada. It runs northward from the former Grand Trunk Railway (GTR) North Main Line in downtown Kitchener, through Waterloo and St. Jacobs before terminating in Elmira. It is currently owned by the Region of Waterloo and operated by CN as the Waterloo Spur. The Waterloo Central Railway runs tourist trains on the line, and the Ion rapid transit runs on the route for a short distance.

== History ==
The line was chartered in 1889 as the Waterloo Junction Railway (WJR) and the first section from Kitchener (then known as Berlin) to Waterloo opened in 1890. The mainline to Elmira opened on 27 October 1891, and the Grand Trunk Railway (GTR) leased the line for 39 years. The original planned end point in Drayton and the planned branches to Elora or Listowel were never completed. As part of a general reorganization, on 1 April 1893 the line was merged into the GTR. In 1910, the original station in Waterloo was rebuilt in brick.

By 1916, the twilight years of the Grand Trunk, the line was listed in employee timetables as a part of the Berlin Subdivision along with the former Preston and Berlin Railway, which had originally been built by the Great Western Railway before being acquired by the Grand Trunk, and connected Berlin to Preston and Galt (now parts of Cambridge) via the mill towns of German Mills and Doon. The southern section, the former Preston and Berlin, was known as the "Galt Section" of the subdivision, while the northern section, the former Waterloo Junction Railway, was known as the "Elmira Section". The subdivision was soon renamed to the "Kitchener Subdivision" following the Berlin to Kitchener name change.

In 1923, the line became part of the new Canadian National Railways (CNR, later simply CN), formed from the Grand Trunk and several other bankrupt lines. Operated as the CNR Waterloo Subdivision, the line ran from Kitchener north to Waterloo and Elmira, and south through Doon and Blair to Galt (west of the Grand River). The southern portion generated very little business for the railway, and was usually operated on an as-needed basis.

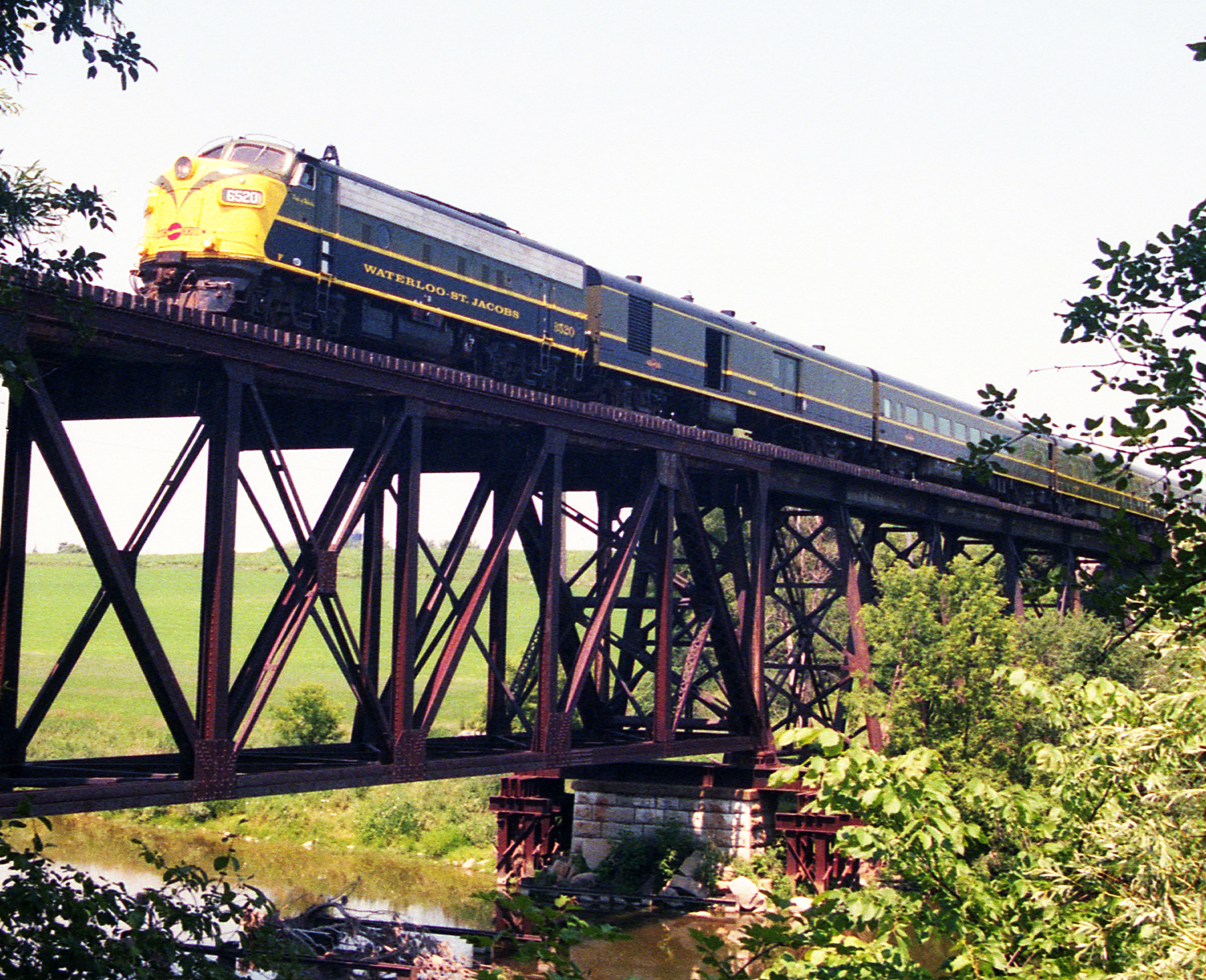
Spirit of St. Jacobs crossing river on first commercial day of operation, July 12, 1997

Eventually the busier northern portion became the Waterloo Spur of the CN Guelph Subdivision. The section from Kitchener to Elmira was purchased by the Regional Municipality of Waterloo in 1995. CN continued freight operations on the line until 1998, when they leased the entire subdivision to the Goderich–Exeter Railway (GEXR). The GEXR's 20-year lease ran out and control of the Guelph Subdivision returned to CN on 16 November 2018.

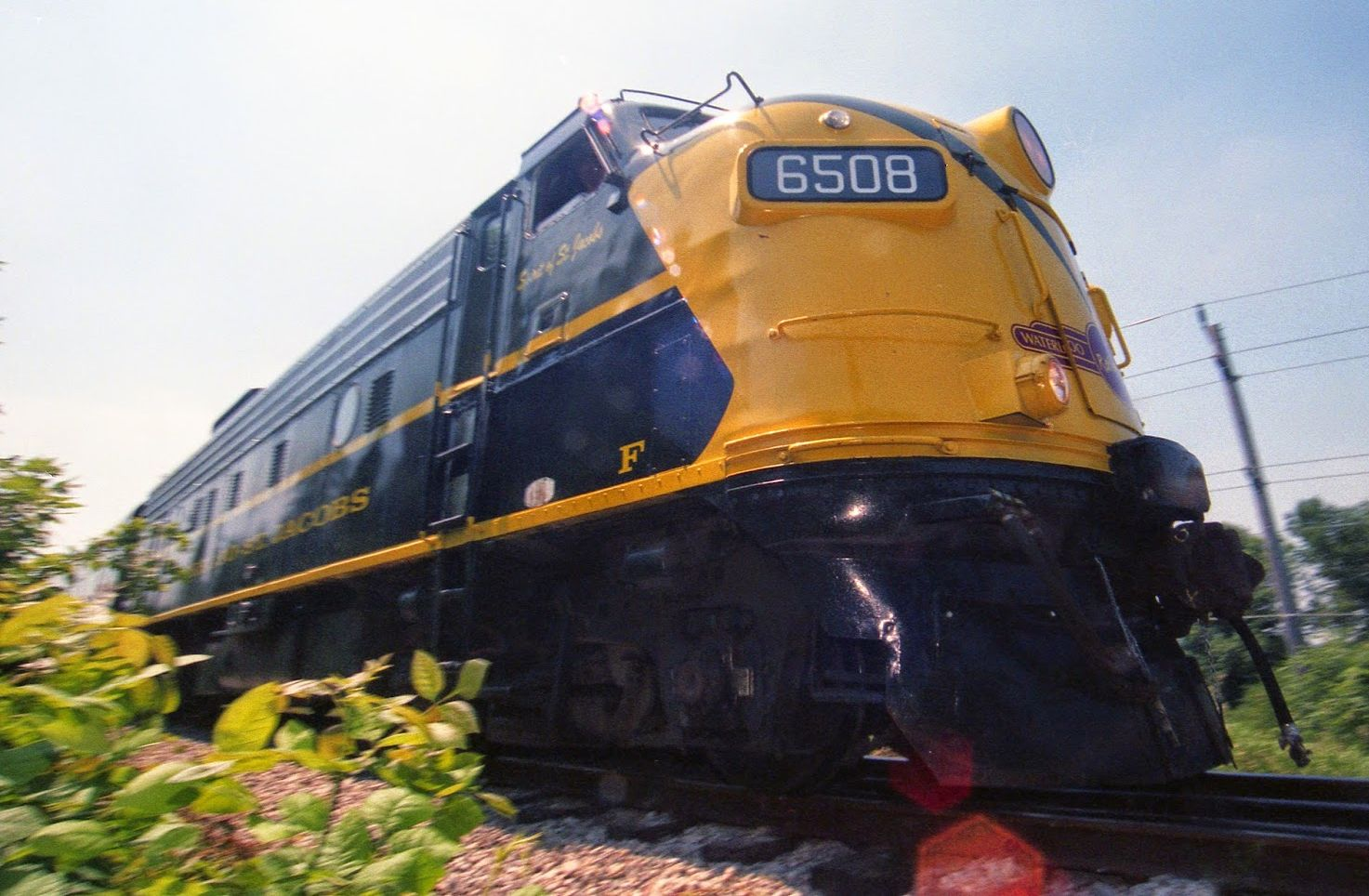
Spirit of St. Jacobs on the first day of service Waterloo-St. Jacobs Railway, July 12, 1997

In 1997, a group of locals formed the Waterloo–St. Jacobs Railway to run passenger trains on off-days, and especially on weekends to the St. Jacobs Farmers' Market. The company went out of business in 1999 after building a new station at Erb and Caroline Streets in Waterloo, and the operation was purchased by the City of Waterloo. In 2007, the Southern Ontario Locomotive Restoration Society relocated to the region and formed the Waterloo Central Railway running tourist trains on the line between the station and the Market, and later expanded to Elmira.

Since 2019, a central section of the line has been used for the Ion light rail service between Waterloo Public Square station and Northfield station. CN continues to run freight operations on the line, operating at night when the Ion service is closed.

Almost all of the original line remains active, except for a spur to Elias Weber Bingeman Snider's Pioneer flour mill in what is now Uptown Waterloo, as well as grain silos in downtown St. Jacobs. The former St. Jacobs passenger station is now used as the Waterloo Central Railway Museum.

== Route ==
Unless otherwise noted, the following is taken from the Southern Ontario Railway Map

The line starts at a junction with the GTR mainline in Kitchener, about a block east of Kitchener station at Weber Street. The line initially runs west-northwest to cross Weber and then bending westward at Roger where a former spur serviced factories on Roger. It meanders northwestward as it crosses downtown Waterloo and the main station on Erb Street. At University Avenue it begins to turn northward, passing through the industrial areas on the north end of the city.

After crossing Benjamin Road on the northern limit of Waterloo it meets the St. Jacobs Market with a stop at the former Heidelberg station. The country opens up as the line runs north to the western side of St. Jacobs. A short spur serves the Home Hardware central warehouses on the western side of town, while another serves St. Jacob's station. The former downtown spur branched off just north of the station.

The line continues roughly northward to enter Elmira on the eastern side of town through an industrial area. The line ends just south of Church Street, where a number of spurs service the Lanxess chemical plant at the eastern end of Mill Street and Canada Colors and Chemicals on First Street.

== Rail trails ==
Some parts of the Waterloo Spur Line are paralleled by multi-use walking and cycling trails, which were constructed in the railway line's right of way in the rail with trail style.

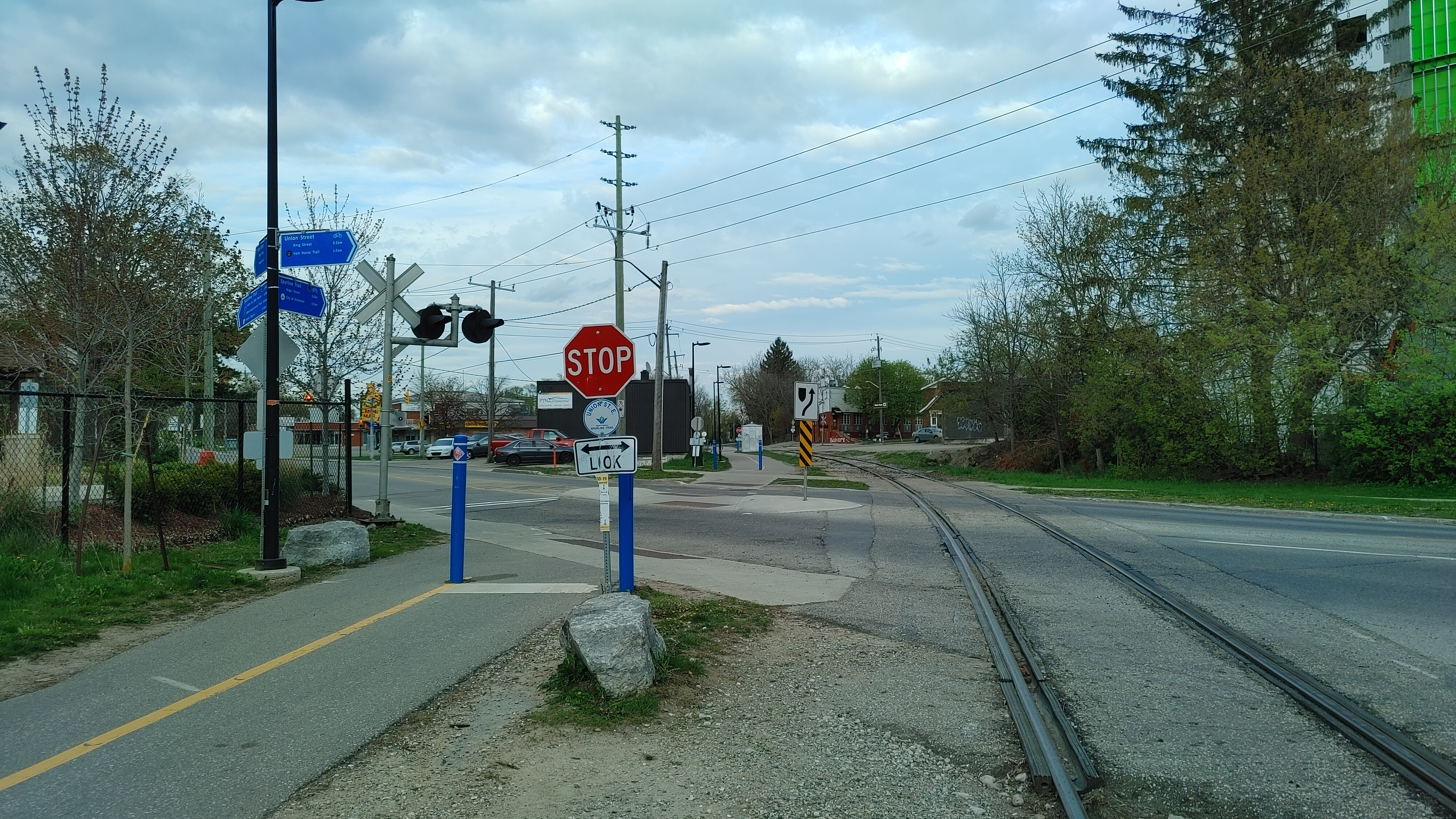
The Spurline Trail (left) and Waterloo Spur (right) crossing at Union Street near the Kitchener–Waterloo municipal boundary.

The innermost trail toward the junction in downtown Kitchener is the Spurline Trail, which covers the 2.4-kilometre (1.5 mi) distance between downtown Kitchener and uptown Waterloo along the line. The Spurline Trail runs mainly through urban areas and was formally established in 2016.

== See also ==
- List of Ontario railways
