= Waterloo–St. Jacobs Railway =

Canadian heritage railway

Coordinates: 43.52°N 80.552768°W

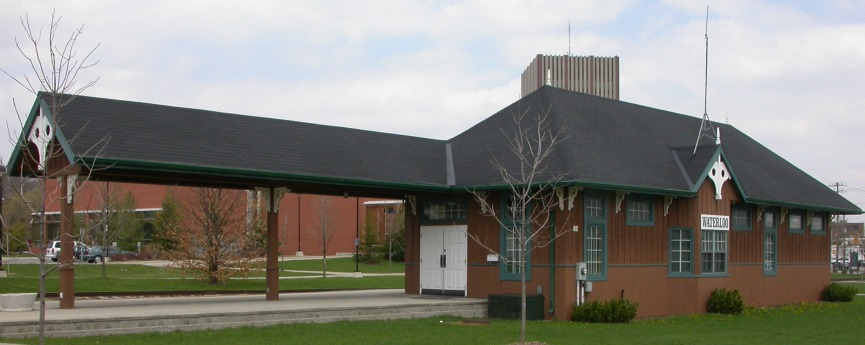
- The WSJR operated from this station in Waterloo.

Overview
- Headquarters: Waterloo
- Reporting mark: WSJR
- Locale: Waterloo, Ontario
- Dates of operation: 1997–1999
- Successor: Waterloo Central Railway

Technical
- Track gauge: 4 ft 8 1/2 in (1,435 mm) standard gauge
- Length: 11.8 mi (19.0 km)

The Waterloo–St. Jacobs Railway (reporting mark WSJR) was a heritage railway west of Toronto that ran between Waterloo and St. Jacobs, Ontario from 1997 to 1999.

== History ==
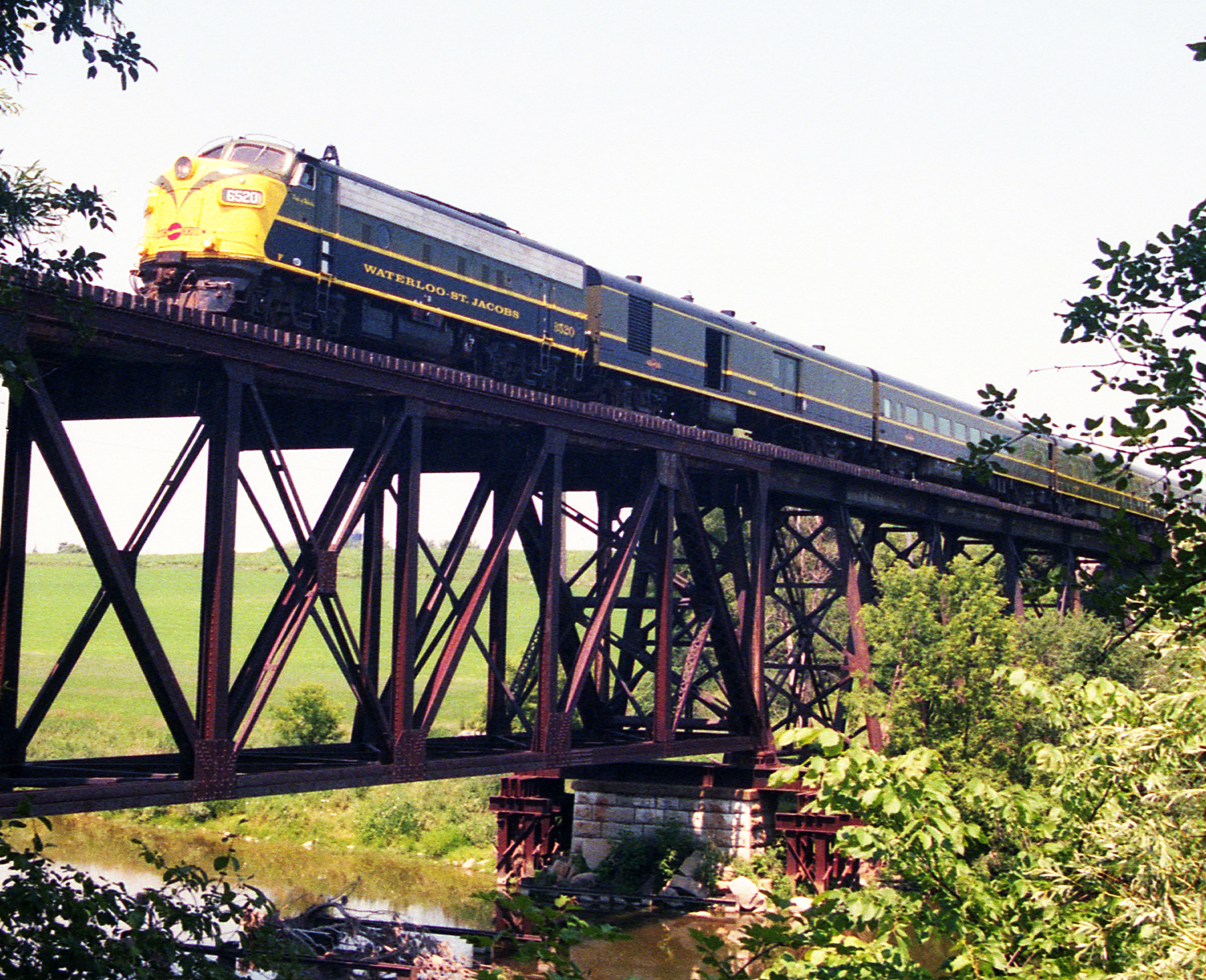
Spirit of St. Jacobs crossing river on first commercial day of operation, July 12, 1997

The railway used two diesel locomotives built in the 1950s, originally owned by Canadian National Railways, and applied an original paint scheme. The locomotives were named Spirit of St. Jacobs and Pride of Waterloo. It also had several passenger cars painted in the same scheme.

Excursions had three stops, and visitors could return on a later train. The Railway allowed visitors to see farms of the Old Order Mennonites and visit the village of St. Jacobs.

The railway ceased operation in 1999 due to maintenance costs. In late 2006, the two diesels and three passenger cars were purchased by the West Coast Railway Association. However, as of 2008 the diesels and one passenger car remained in Via Rail's Mimico maintenance yard.

In May 2007, the Southern Ontario Locomotive Restoration Society received approval from the City of Waterloo to launch a new Waterloo–St. Jacobs tourist train service, the Waterloo Central Railway.

== See also ==
- Waterloo Junction Railway
- List of Ontario railways
- List of heritage railways in Canada
- List of defunct Canadian railways
