= Hachborn =

Hachborn is a surname. Notable people with the surname include:

- Len Hachborn (born 1961), Canadian ice hockey player
- Walter Hachborn (1921–2016), Canadian businessman
