= Maxtech Consumer Products =

Maxtech Consumer Products Limited, a Canadian design and manufacturing group, markets hand tools and power tool accessories under its brands and private labels throughout North America and Europe. Their headquarters have been in Waterloo, Ontario since they began operating in 1977.

Maxtech Consumer Products Limited Logo

== History ==
Maxtech developed as part of a larger manufacturing group under the name Mastercut Industries Inc., until splitting into its own company in the 1990s. The company was started by Kacee (Kailash, K.C.) Vasudeva, who also started Maxtech Manufacturing Group, originally Maxi-Flow. The manufacturing company, that produced automotive parts and tools for the Consumer Products business, was forced to shut its doors because of rising costs and an uneven Canadian dollar. The majority of production for the Consumer Products group had been moved overseas, and at that point the remaining production was moved there as well. Vasudeva and the company have been recognized with multiple honours since they began operating.

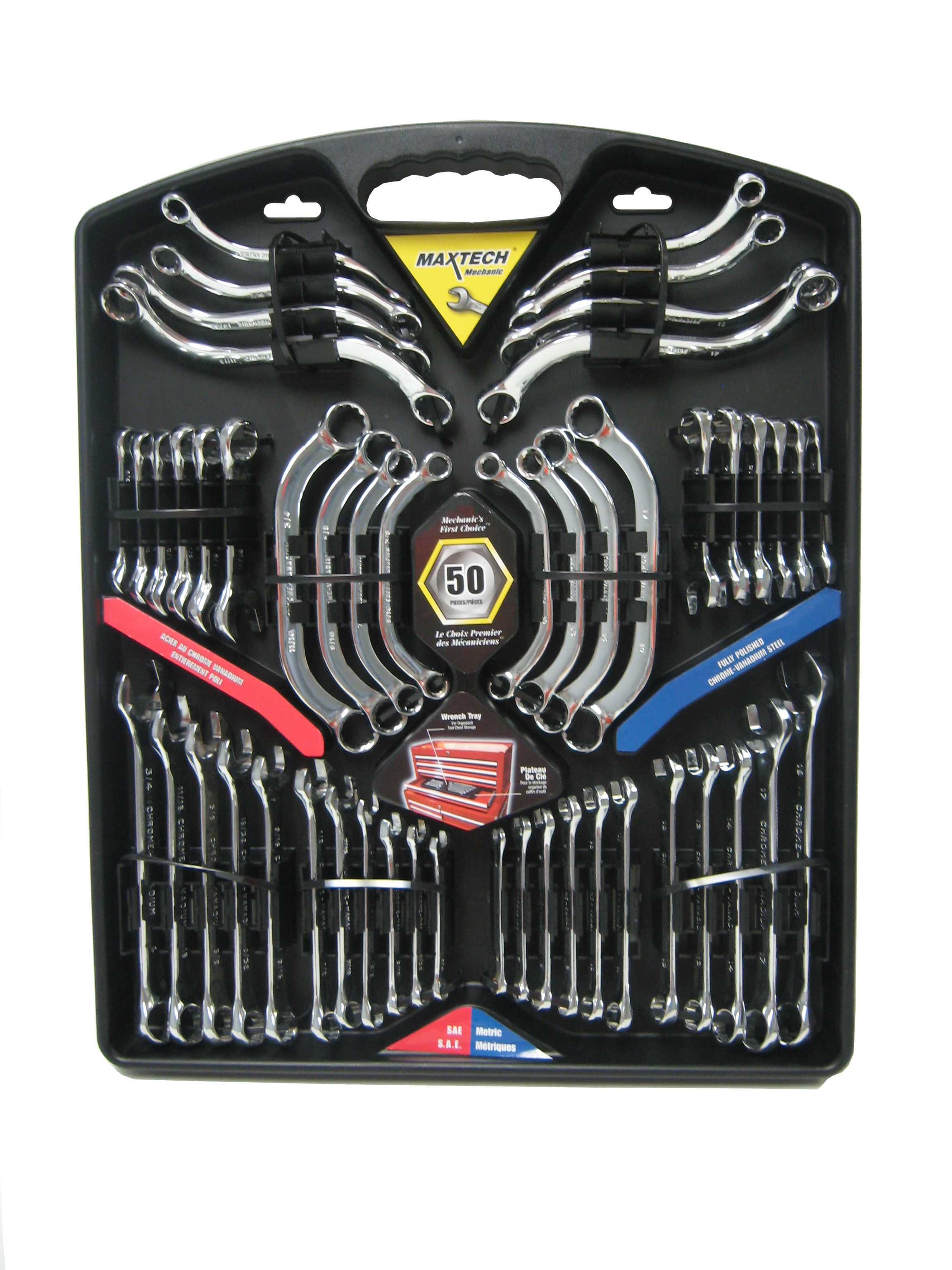
50 Piece Wrench Set by Maxtech

The company engineers and designs hand and power tool accessories under several in house brands, as well as for major retailers under their private labels in North America. The company started with one product, a hacksaw, and one retailer, and has grown to a major supplier of private label products.

== Products ==
Maxtech specializes in hand tool, mechanic's tools, and power tool accessory lines for retailers.

Maxtech supplies private label tools to Canadian Tire (Jobmate, Mastercraft, Maximum), Sears (Craftsman), The Home Depot (Husky), Home Hardware (Benchmark, Home Handyman), and other retailers as well as products under the Maxtech Brand. In 2009, Maxtech supported Canadian Tire's Jumpstart Charity, which helps financially challenged families and children to get involved in sports.

In 2009 Maxtech expanded their product line to include tables, workbenches and stands for DIY’ers. In 2011, they are rolling out a new workbench under private label through Canada.

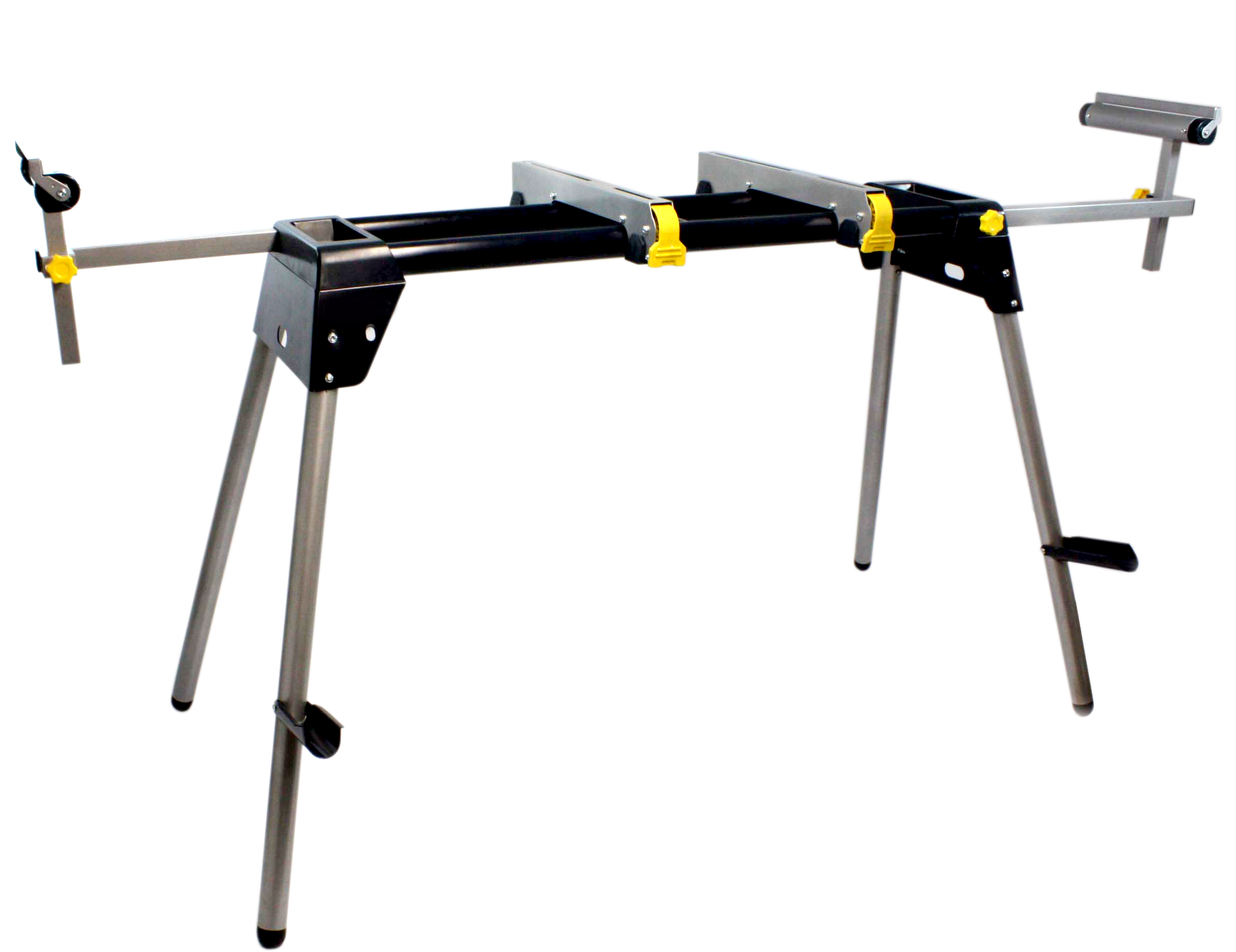
Maxtech's Folding Mitre Saw Stand

In 2020, in response to the COVID-19 coronavirus pandemic, Maxtech began retailing small batches of Level 2 face masks.

Maxtech introduced reusable cases for tool sets in the 1990s, and has gained several patents and awards for their cases.
