= IFT =

IFT may refer to:

== Groups, organizations, companies ==
- Federal Telecommunications Institute (Spanish: Instituto Federal de Telecomunicaciones), a government agency of Mexico
- Independent Film Trust
- Initiative for Free Trade
- Institute of Food Technologists
- Institute for Tourism Studies, Macao (Portuguese: Instituto de Formação Turística)
- International Federation of Translators
- Irish Film Theatre

== Vehicular and transportation ==
- Initial Flight Training
- Integrated Flight Test
  - Starship integrated flight tests

== Science, medicine, math, engineering, technology ==
- Implicit function theorem
- Information field theory
- Interferential therapy
- Intraflagellar transport
- Inverse Fourier transform
- Inverse function theorem

== Other uses ==
- "I.F.T." (Breaking Bad), a 2010 TV episode of Breaking Bad
