= Essex Terminal Railway =

Shortline terminal railway based in London, Ontario, Canada

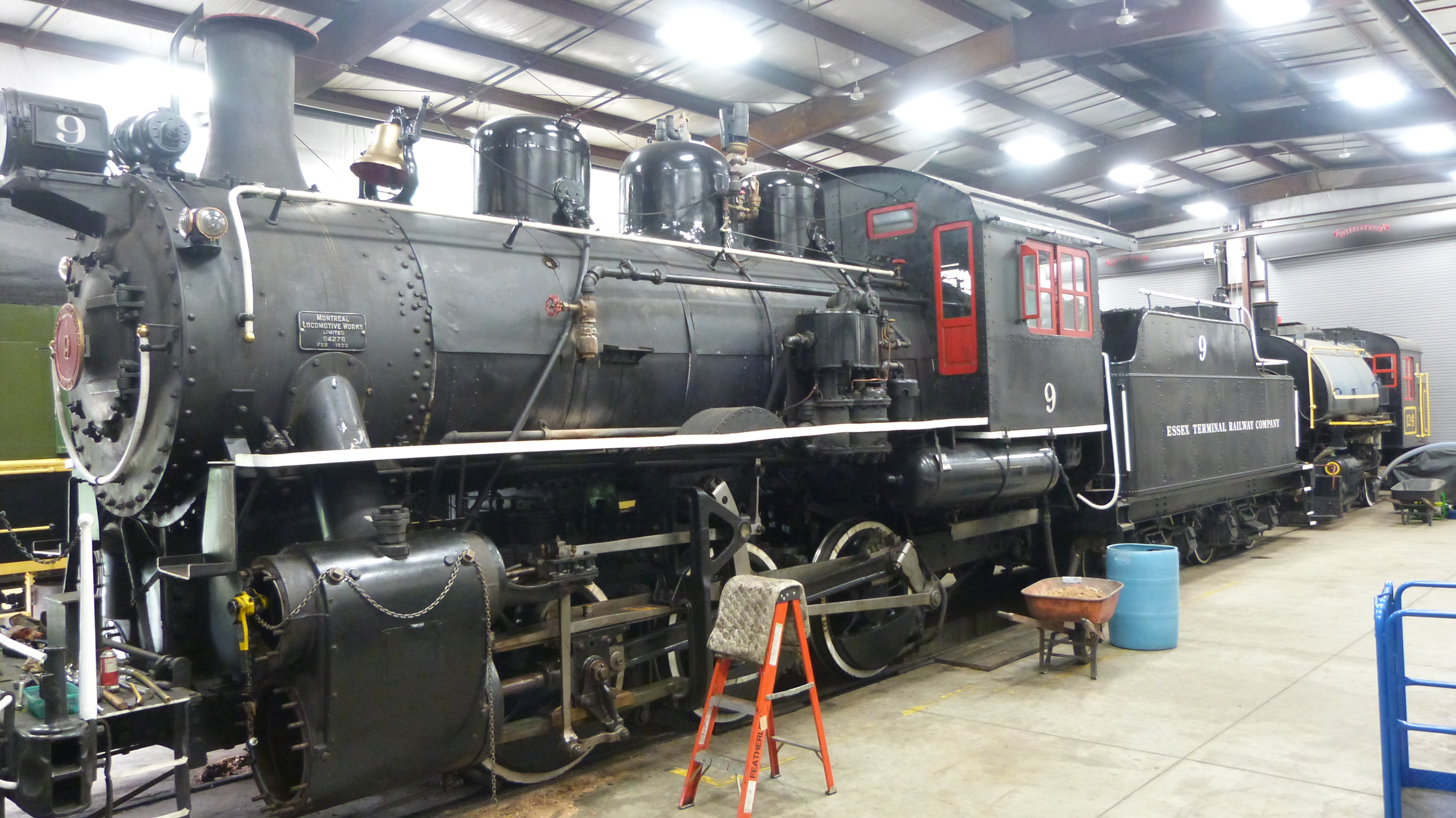
- No. 9, built by Montreal Locomotive Works, entered service on the railway in 1923.

Overview
- Headquarters: Windsor
- Reporting mark: ETL
- Locale: Windsor, Ontario
- Dates of operation: 1902–present

Technical
- Track gauge: 1,435 mm (4 ft 8 1/2 in) standard gauge
- Length: 34 kilometres (21 mi)

Other
- Website: www.etr.ca

Essex Terminal Railway (reporting mark ETL) is a Canadian shortline terminal railroad, running from the City of Windsor, Ontario through LaSalle, to Amherstburg, Ontario, for a distance of approximately 21 miles (34 km). ETL has direct connections to Canadian Pacific Railway, Canadian National Railway and CSX. ETL is owned by Essex Morterm Holdings. Founded in 1902, it is one of the oldest existing railways in Canada.

== History ==
The railway was founded in 1902 as a western connection of the Grand Trunk Railway (now Canadian National Railway) to factories in the east end of Windsor. Construction of the line took place between 1902 and 1918. During World War II, the trains hauled military and industrial equipment (e.g. Bren Gun carriers, and trucks) from Ford Windsor and other industries, to interchanges with Canadian National and Canadian Pacific railways. Its four-stall engine house and yard office are located on Lincoln Road.

As a part of the urban renewal of Windsor, the railway sold several kilometers of spur line in central Windsor to the City of Windsor and various developers in 1998, allowing new homes and businesses to be built along the former rail. The main line was generally unchanged however ETR became more dependent on down river traffic and several upgrades were made.

In September 2002, ETL celebrated its 100th anniversary and brought its newly restored 1923 Number 9 0-6-0 locomotive down from St. Thomas, Ontario. The company was loaned several 1930s CPR and CN passenger cars to give rides to nearby residents that celebrated with the company. Number 9 currently operates out of Waterloo, Ontario. A week after the centennial celebration, the ETR had its first serious derailment in decades, caused by abnormally heavy rains. Cars carrying soybeans were involved. There were no injuries, the tracks were repaired and two nearby grade crossings repaved.

In early 2013, a connection was made so that ETR could provide service to the Hiram Walkers tank farm just west of the Via Rail Walkerville Station. Ex-CN rail track is accessed (stopping short of George Ave.) but is not connected to the VIA mainline. It is now the only active track to cross Walker Road near Riverside Drive, after the VIA station tracks were terminated east of Walker.

In 2017, ETL purchased the former General Motors plant property in south Walkerville and renovated into an automotive logistics yard for new Chrysler vehicles that await shipment. The site is run under the name MotiPark, and is owned by Essex Morterm Holdings.

As of 2020, the ETL services nine customers, transporting a variety of commodities like grains, fuels, salt, lumber, steel, and alcohol. Ojibway yard is used as a central location for switching operations and car storage, with other smaller storage yards located in both west and east Windsor. Diageo and the former Honeywell/General Chemical property, which also used for railcar storage, is located in Amherstburg at the southern end of the line. With substantial increases in new business and staff in recent years, the former corporate office building across the street has been rented out to an outside client, replaced by the new main office, the former CIBC building at the corner of Lincoln Road and Tecumseh Road East. Due to heavy development along much of the mainline and a high concentration of level crossings along ETL's entire route, track speed is 10 mph.

In 2026, ETR purchased the former Windsor Mold building on Durham Place and moved head office operations, Maintenance of Way for the railroad, and their automotive storage facility, Motipark, to this new location.

== ETL locomotives and rolling stock ==
ETL previously owned an 0-6-0 switcher steam locomotive, No. 9. It was purchased by the railroad in 1923 and worked in revenue service until making its final run for ETL in 1956 and later taken out of service in 1960, it was later used to provide heat for a building for three years until being officially retired from service in 1963 and put into storage in the ETL engine house. In 1986, it was leased to the Southern Ontario Locomotive Restoration Society who restored it to operating condition in 1997. Today, the engine is now operated by the Waterloo Central Railway.

Today, the ETL now currently owns four diesel locomotives and currently operates LDSX 4620, an ex Grand Trunk Western (GP9R). They are 104 (ex-ICG EMD SW14), 105 (EMD SW9), 107 (EMD SW1500) and 108 (EMD GP9). All 4 of ETR's locomotives were recently refurbished by Lambton Diesel Specialists of Sarnia with 104 and 105 receiving heritage paint schemes, new engines, new traction motors, among several other upgrades. An additional LDSX unit, LDSX 2001, an EMD GP38-2, was borrowed from Lambton Diesel by ETR for the 2023/2024 winter season and was delivered out of Windsor on August 17, 2024, trailing on CN 438 (Windsor to London).

ETL has several pieces of rolling stock used for storage; a covered hopper and a boxcar are on-trucks but stationary at the engine facility on Lincoln Road.

They had two ex-CP wide vision cabooses which have been sold to Waterloo Central Railroad and were renumbered from ETL 1610 to WCRX 1040 and ETL 1600 to WCRX 1042. The ETL now no longer has cabooses on the roster.
