= Essex Terminal Railway 9 =

Preserved S162 class 0-6-0 steam locomotive

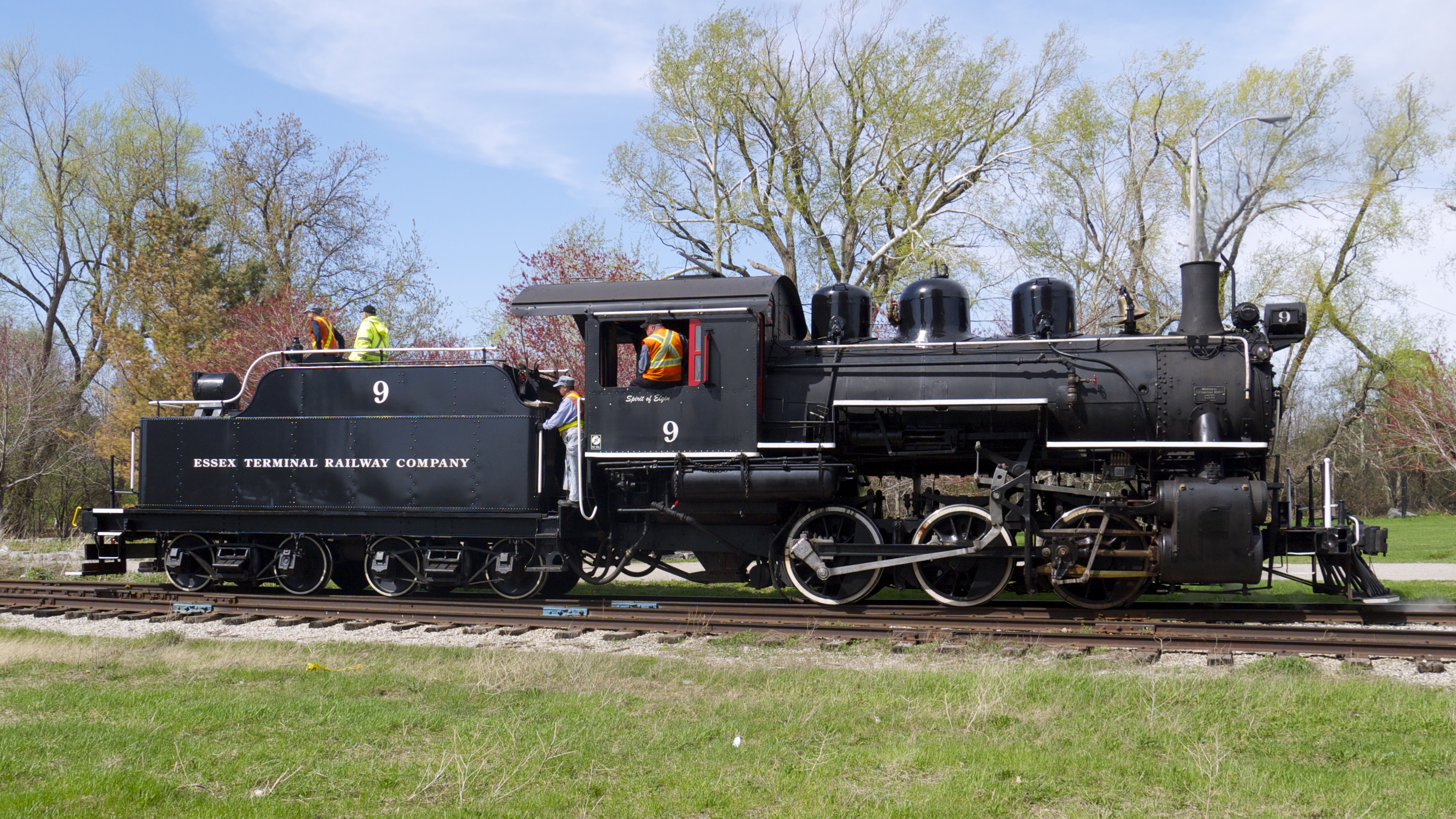
- No. 9 operating on the Waterloo Central Railway on May 10, 2014
Type and origin
- Power type: Steam
- Designer: American Locomotive Company
- Builder: Montreal Locomotive Works
- Serial number: 64276
- Model: S146
- Build date: February 1923
- Rebuild date: 2012
Specifications
- Configuration
  - Whyte: 0-6-0
  - UIC: C
- Driver: 2nd coupled axle
- Gauge: 4 ft 8 1/2 in (1,435 mm)
- Driver dia.: 4 ft 3 in (1.30 m)
- Length: 57 ft (680 in; 57 ft)
- Width: 10 ft (120 in; 10 ft)
- Height: 14 ft (170 in; 14 ft)
- Loco weight: 146,000 lb (66,000 kg)
- Tender weight: 98,600 lb (44,700 kg)
- Fuel type: Coal
- Fuel capacity: 16,000 lb (7,300 kg)
- Water cap.: 3,700 US gal (14,000 L; 3,100 imp gal)
- Boiler pressure: 180 psi (1.24 MPa)
- Cylinders: Two, outside
- Cylinder size: 20 mm × 26 mm (0.79 in × 1.02 in)
- Valve gear: Walschaerts
- Valve type: Piston valves
- Loco brake: Air
- Train brakes: Air
- Couplers: Knuckle
Performance figures
- Power output: 1,400 hp (1,000 kW)
- Tractive effort: 31,800 lb (14,400 kg)
Career
- Operators: Essex Terminal Railway; St. Thomas Central Railway; Waterloo Central Railway
- Class: S162
- Numbers: ETL 9; STCR 9; WCR 9
- Nicknames: Pride of Elgin; Spirit of Elgin
- First run: 1923
- Last run: 1956
- Retired: 1963
- Restored: October 2, 1997
- Current owner: Southern Ontario Locomotive Restoration Society
- Disposition: Operational

Essex Terminal Railway 9 is a preserved S162 class 0-6-0 "Switcher" type steam locomotive, built in February 1923 by the Montreal Locomotive Works (MLW) for the Essex Terminal Railway (ETL), the locomotive was in active service until 1956 and later retired in 1963. It is currently owned by the Southern Ontario Locomotive Restoration Society and it is operated as a tourist attraction, as part of the Waterloo Central Railway (WCR), in St. Jacobs, Ontario.

== History ==
=== Revenue service ===
No. 9 was built in February 1923 by the Montreal Locomotive Works (MLW), it was based on a design created by its parent company, the American Locomotive Company (ALCO). It was purchased by the Essex Terminal Railway (ETL), a shortline operator in the Windsor, Ontario area. It worked for thirty years in revenue service hauling freight for ETL until making its final run in St. Thomas, Ontario in 1956 and removed from service in 1960.

In 1960, No. 9 would be used as an external boiler to provide heat for a building for three years until it was retired and put into storage in the ETL engine house in Windsor, Ontario in 1963. It was donated to the Ontario Government for display at the Ontario Science Centre, but was rejected after they cancelled rail exhibits and dissolved rail collections. In 1971, No. 9 was loaned to the Ontario Railway Association. The association moved the locomotive into storage in Milton, Ontario and was kept in storage until 1985.

=== Restoration ===
In April 1986, No. 9 was leased to the Southern Ontario Locomotive Restoration Society (SOLRS) for restoration. In July 1986, it was moved to the Ontario Hydro generating station at Nanticoke, Ontario, where it was later moved into the Jarvis Hydro Plant and disassembled in November 1988. In December 1993, No. 9 was moved to St. Thomas, Ontario, where SOLRS had acquired a portion of the Elgin County Railway Museum, located in the former Michigan Central Railway locomotive erecting shop, where restoration work began. On October 2, 1997, restoration work was completed, and the locomotive moved under its own power for the first time in thirty-four years.

=== St. Thomas Operation ===
On June 14, 1998, SOLRS began to operate No. 9 as a tourist attraction, naming it the St. Thomas Central Railway (STCR), and running on the Canada Southern Railway line, which at the time was owned and maintained by both the Canadian National and Canadian Pacific Railways.

In October 2001, SOLRS was granted ownership of the No. 9. During its time in St. Thomas, No. 9 was given the name "Pride of Elgin". In September 2002, the locomotive briefly returned to the Windsor area, to participate in the Essex Terminal Railway's 100th anniversary celebrations.

CN and CP had purchased the CASO line from MCR in 1985, primarily to acquire the railway's tunnel under the Detroit River, and their bridge at Niagara Falls. But the companies had little interest in maintaining the rest of the line, and gradually began to abandon it, section by section. Unable to afford to maintain the track as well as the locomotive and its rolling stock, SOLRS eventually decided to move their operation to St. Jacobs, Ontario.

=== St. Jacobs Operation ===
Beginning in 2007, SOLRS began to run No. 9 as part of their operation in St. Jacobs, which is named the Waterloo Central Railway (WCR). The former CN Waterloo Spur is used, which is owned and maintained by the Region of Waterloo, and it is also used by the Goderich-Exeter Railway for freight operations.

SOLRS also owns three diesel locomotives, which are the primary motive power used for their tourist train service between St. Jacobs Farmers' Market Station and the station at Elmira, Ontario, where it runs frequently on Saturdays and long weekends, and for specially named theme excursions.

In 2009, No. 9 was taken out of service to undergo a major rebuild, it eventually returned to service in 2012, it had another rebuilt in 2021.

In 2022, No. 9 was again taken out of service to undergo its 10-year boiler recertification and reconditioning at the St. Jacobs shops. The rebuild process included modernizing elements, such as adding a second sight glass, new stay bolts and a new brake stand.

In February 2023, No. 9 celebrated its 100th birthday.
