= Walter Hachborn =

Canadian businessman

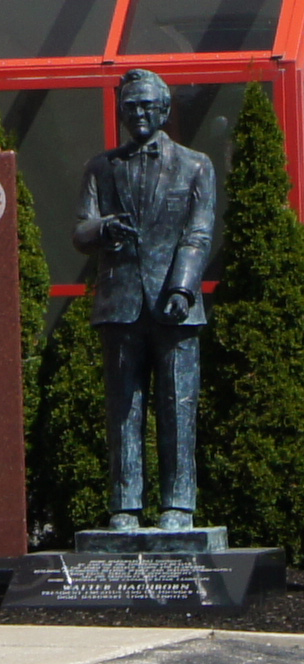
- Statue of Walter Hachborn, outside of Home Hardware's headquarters in St. Jacobs
- Born: July 24, 1921; Conestogo, Ontario, Canada
- Died: December 16, 2016 (aged 95)
- Known for: Co-founder of Home Hardware

Walter Hachborn, CM (July 24, 1921 – December 16, 2016) was a Canadian businessman and co-founder, with two others, of Home Hardware, a Canadian home improvement and construction retailer which supplies contractors and consumers.

He started working in the hardware industry in 1938 and created Home Hardware in 1964 with two partners, Henry Sittler and Arthur Zilliax. He had been its president since the beginning seeing the company grow from 122 dealers to over 1100 stores and annual sales of over $6 billion. He retired from day-to-day operations in 1988 and was president emeritus until 2010 with more than 75 years in the hardware industry.

== Early life ==
On July 24, 1921, he was born in Conestogo, Ontario. His parents, William and Florence (Ritter) Hachborn, moved to St. Jacobs when he was four years old, where his father worked as the millwright at Snider Flour Mills. Hachborn attended Elmira High School.

Hachborn enlisted in the army from 1939 to 1946, when he returned to work at an expanded Hollinger Hardware. Owner Gordon Hollinger died in 1948, with Hachborn taking on many of his duties. He lived in St. Jacobs, Ontario for most of his life.

== Career ==
In 1938, he began working at a hardware store in St. Jacobs as a stockboy. The store was then named Hollinger Hardware. He co-owned the store by 1950, along with Henry Sittler and Arthur Zilliax.

In 1956, he read an article in Hardware Age titled "case for the dealer-owned wholesaler," and was inspired to start planning for a dealer-owned Canadian hardware organization.

In 1964, he founded a co-operative along with over 100 hardware store owners, which would later grow into Home Hardware. He was president from inception. Initially, 128 Ontario retail workers purchased Hollinger Hardware in 1964, which was renamed Home Hardware in 1967.

In 1981, Home Hardware merged with Link Hardware of Western Canada, while remaining a hardware co-op with Hachborn as head of the company.

In 2007, he was still president of Home Hardware, with Paul Straus CEO.

He was still president emeritus upon his death at the age of 95. In his later years, he was also involved in construction operations in the Cayman Islands, while maintaining his residence in St. Jacobs.

== Recognition ==
In 1985, he was awarded an honorary doctorate from Wilfrid Laurier University, where he was a member of WLU's board of governors for 10 years. In 1988, the Retail Council of Canada recognized Hachborn's success at Home Hardware. In recognition of this accomplishment he was presented with the Distinguished Canadian Retailer of the Year Award. He was also awarded the distinction of Retailer of the Century in 1999. In 1999, he was made a Member of the Order of Canada. He was named to the Canadian Business Hall of Fame in 2014.

== Personal life and death ==
He and his wife Jean had three children: Susan, Elizabeth, and Bill. Jean Hachborn died in 2014, while Charles died in St. Jacobs on December 16, 2016, at the age of 95.
