= Beaver Lumber =

Canadian lumber business

- Type: Subsidiary
- Industry: Retail (Department & Discount)
- Founded: 1906
- Defunct: 2000
- Fate: Acquired by Home Hardware
- Headquarters: Markham, Ontario, Canada
- Number of locations: 138 (2000)
- Products: Retail hardware supplies, Lumber and building materials
- Parent: Molson
- Website: beaverlumber.ca (redirects to homehardware.ca)

Beaver Lumber (Castor Bricoleur in Quebec) was a Canadian building supply chain owned by Molson. It was once Canada's fourth largest building supply chain with 138 stores. In 2000, it was purchased by Home Hardware, a cooperative of over 1,000 independent Canadian hardware stores. Beaver Lumber stores were rebranded as Home Building Centres.

== History ==
Beaver Lumber, once Canada's leading supplier of lumber, building materials and related products and services, began in 1883 as the Banbury Bros. Lumber Company in Wolseley, Saskatchewan. Banbury Bros. Lumber Company bought its local rival, Gibson Lumber, in 1904 and two years later joined with the Regina Lumber and Supply Co., creating a business with twelve lumberyards. A thirst for expansion resulted in the Banbury brothers striking a deal with some Winnipeg lumberyards. A new name was needed that was in some way connected to wood, so when Edwin Banbury suggested "Beaver", the company identity was created in 1906 and would become an institution in parts of Canada for another 90 years.

Beaver Lumber was a community-based business and focused on building relationships with its customers. The company eventually operated 130 stores across the country.

Molson, the Montreal-based brewing giant, bought Beaver Lumber for $40 million in 1972. In 1987, Groupe Val Royal entered into a strategic agreement with the Molson Companies to acquire the Castor Bricoleur locations in Quebec and integrated them to its Brico Centre chain, a hardware retailer that was already operating three stores at the time. Val-Royal later launched in early 1993 the Réno-Dépôt chain with a warehouse format and made no secret that the plan was to progressively shut down the eight existing Brico stores as they were deemed too small to continue in the new economy.

Molson sold the rest of the retail chain to Home Hardware for $68 million in 1999.

== Legacy ==
The first store opened by Edwin and his brother, Robert, was sold to the Wolseley Museum Association in 1980, who subsequently closed it and sold it to local entrepreneur, Jacquie Jacobs-Marshall. It stands on Blanchard Street and has been proposed as a future site of the Wolseley Heritage Foundation Archive.

Beaver Lumber's last Head Office at 7303 Warden Avenue in Markham is now home to Lyreco, Brookfield Properties and TTI.
