= Spurline Trail =

Urban multi-use trail in Ontario, Canada

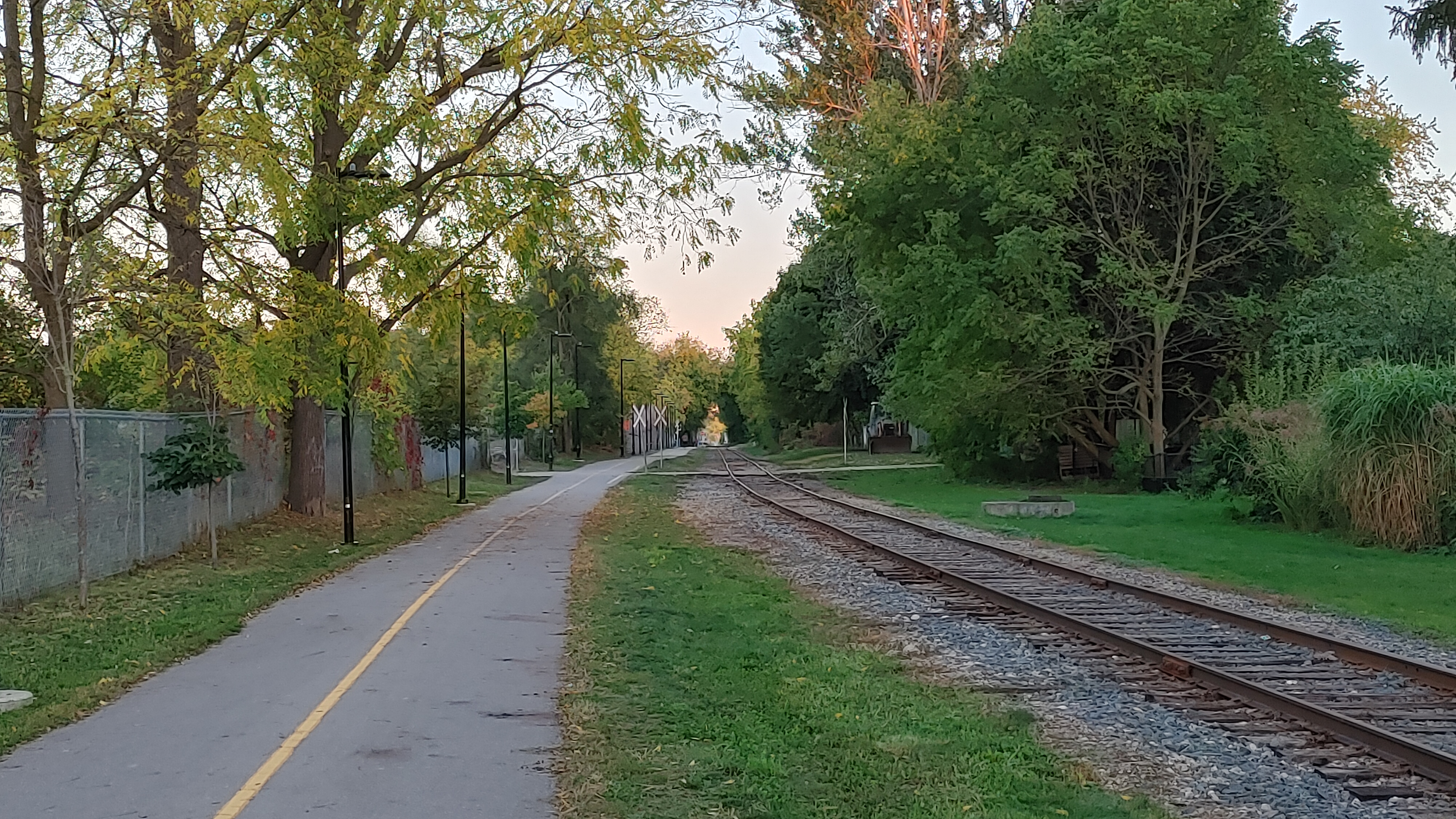
- View looking south on the trail just to the north of Ferdinand Avenue.
- Length: 2.4 km (1.5 mi)
- Location: Waterloo and Kitchener, Ontario, Canada
- Established: 2016; 10 years ago
- Trailheads: Waterloo: Laurel Trail near Waterloo City Hall; Kitchener: Ahrens Street West
- Use: Walking; cycling
- Surface: Asphalt
- Right of way: CN Waterloo Spur
- Maintainer: City of Kitchener; City of Waterloo

The Spurline Trail is a multi-use urban rail with trail which connects the cities of Waterloo and Kitchener, Ontario, Canada. Its northern trailhead is at the point where the CN Waterloo Spur crosses Laurel Creek; it connects to the Laurel Trail there, and is close to Uptown Waterloo. Its southern trailhead is at Ahrens Street West near its intersection with Breithaupt Street, close to Kitchener station and downtown Kitchener. The trail is 2.4 kilometres (1.5 mi) long, the entirety of which is paved. For its whole length, the trail runs parallel and to the north of the CN Waterloo Spur, stopping just short of where the Waterloo Spur joins the GO Transit Guelph Subdivision mainline at a junction just east of Kitchener station.

== History ==
The Spurline Trail was established in 2016 through cooperation between regional and municipal governments, as well as Metrolinx, to formalize the existing, informal dirt trail running next to the Waterloo Spur, and to provide infrastructure upgrades such as lighting and a paved surface.

In 2019, the City of Waterloo approved an additional trail improvement: a refuge island to be constructed in the middle of Union Street, in order to improve safety at the trail crossing point. With a full reconstruction of Union Street looming, city staff proposed further improvements at the crossing in early 2021. This would create a new secondary route making it easier for trail users to cross at the signalized intersection as an alternative to using the refuge island. Included in the same plan was a proposed cycling corridor on Union Street from King Street to Moore Avenue, which would connect with the Spurline Trail.

== See also ==
- Waterloo Junction Railway
- Regional Municipality of Waterloo, Ontario
- Iron Horse Trail
- List of rail trails
- List of trails in Canada
