= Kacee Vasudeva =

Indian businessman

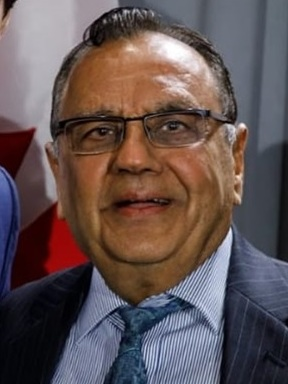
Vasudeva in 2020

Kailash (Kacee) Vasudeva is an Indian-born Canadian businessman. He has designed products ranging from automotive products and tools, power tool accessories, mosquito and bed bug prevention, and eco-friendly packaging.

== Early life and move to Canada ==
Born to mother, Kaushalya Devi Vasudeva, and father, Uttam Chand Vasudeva, on 6 October 1945. He graduated from the Indo Swiss Training Center in Chandigarh, India, and worked as an engineer in the Mahle Piston division at Escorts.

Vasudeva immigrated to Canada in September 1971 and gained experience in various industries. He started Maxi-Flow from his garage in 1977. He also founded Mastercut Industries Inc in 1979, now known as Maxtech Consumer Products, whose specialty is designing and manufacturing hand tools and power tool accessories sold in Canada, the United States, Mexico, the United Kingdom and Germany.

== Career ==
On December 15, 2025, Vasudeva received the 2025 Distinguished Innovator Award at the Inventorium Awards, presented by the Innoventors Foundation in Silicon Valley, California, and was also inducted into the organization's Hall of Fame. The recognition acknowledged more than four decades of work in developing and commercializing innovations across multiple industries. Vasudeva's patent portfolio includes inventions related to automotive components, power tools, consumer safety, pest control, public health technologies, and air purification and personal protective equipment (PPE) systems.

In February 2025, Vasudeva was awarded the King Charles III Coronation Medal in recognition of his contributions to Canada and the Region of Waterloo.

Vasudeva received Canadian Aboriginal & Minority Suppliers Council's 2020 Business Achievement Award in Special Recognition Category on behalf of Maxtech.

Vasudeva has been a board member for the Automotive Parts Manufacturers' Association since 2001.

Vasudeva was named Outstanding Business Leader in 1998 by Wilfrid Laurier University.

Vasudeva accompanied former Prime Minister Jean Chrétien on a trade mission to Asia in January 1997. During Prime Minister Justin Trudeau's visit to India in February, 2018, Vasudeva again was part of the delegation.

Vasudeva was named Businessman of the Year by the Indo-Canada Chamber of Commerce (ICCC) in 1997.
