= Conestogo, Ontario =

Conestogo
- Unincorporated community
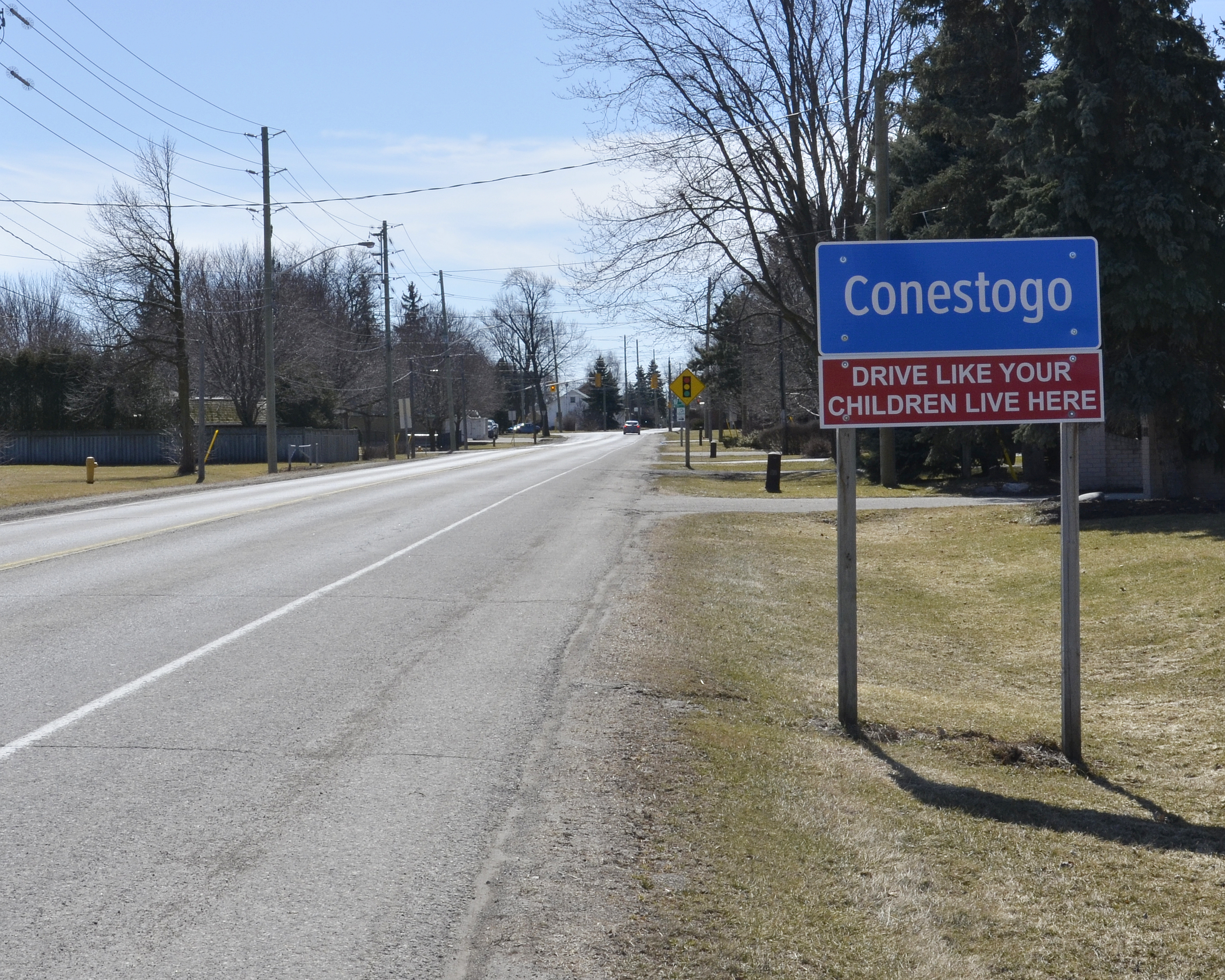

- Location within Regional Municipality of Waterloo Location within Southern Ontario
- Coordinates: 43°32′29″N 80°30′15″W
- Country: Canada
- Province: Ontario
- Regional municipality: Waterloo
- Township: Woolwich

Area
  - Total: 2.13 km^{2} (0.82 sq mi)

Population (2016)
  - Total: 1,270
  - Density: 595.5/km^{2} (1,542/sq mi)
- Time zone: UTC-5 (EST)
  - Summer (DST): UTC-4 (EDT)
- Forward sortation area: N0B 1N0
- Area codes: 519 and 226
- NTS Map: 040P10
- GNBC Code: FASNT

Conestogo (pronounced [ˌkʰɒ̽.nə.ˈs͡t̠ˠəʊ̯.ɡə]) is a community in the Canadian province of Ontario, located in the township of Woolwich in Waterloo Region. The population in 2016 was 1,270.

The community is located at the junction of the Grand and Conestogo Rivers. Conestogo is a terminus of the Avon Trail.

== History ==
The vicinity of present day Conestogo was first settled in 1820s, on the Grand and Conestogo Rivers. The first settlers were predominantly Mennonites who had emigrated from Pennsylvania, settling on land laid out by David Musselman and Charles Hendry. They were followed by people of German and British background. The first mill in Woolwich Township was built in Conestogo in 1846 by David Musselman powered by the Conestogo River. Two large flax mills were soon built. The Post Office was established in 1849 by Charles Hendry.

Known earlier as Bluckstettel (log village) and Musselman's Mills, the settlement was renamed Conestogo in 1852. The name originated from the Conestoga River in Lancaster County, Pennsylvania. (There were several spellings of the name, but the one ending in "o" became official.) In 1844, David Musselman dammed the Conestoga River and built the first flour mill, and the second sawmill in the area.

By the middle of the 19th century, Conestogo was a thriving community of about 300 people. It boasted a number of businesses, including a foundry, flour mill, sawmill, furniture factory, paint factory, flax mill, distillery, four hotels, three blacksmiths, two wagon makers and a cooperage, among others. Two local brickyards produced the bricks of which many Conestogo buildings were constructed. The slow pace of Conestogo's development after the 1860s has resulted in much of the architectural heritage being well preserved. By 1864, there was a large school with about 70 students and two churches: Lutheran and Wesleyan Methodist.

The village had a population of 500 by 1890 but by 1913, it had declined to 250.

== Demographics ==
In the 2021 Census of Population conducted by Statistics Canada, Conestogo had a population of 1,272 living in 445 of its 447 total private dwellings, a change of 0.2% from its 2016 population of 1,270. With a land area of 2.16 km^{2} (0.83 sq mi), it had a population density of 588.9/km^{2} (1,525.2/sq mi) in 2021.

== Notable people ==
- William Daum Euler, politician
- James Livingston, politician
- Leeanna Pendergast, politician
- Walter Hachborn, founder of Home Hardware
- William B. Wiegand, research chemist and executive
- Emily Yeung, host of children's television program, This is Emily Yeung

== See also ==
- List of unincorporated communities in Ontario
