= Independent Film Trust =

The Independent Film Trust
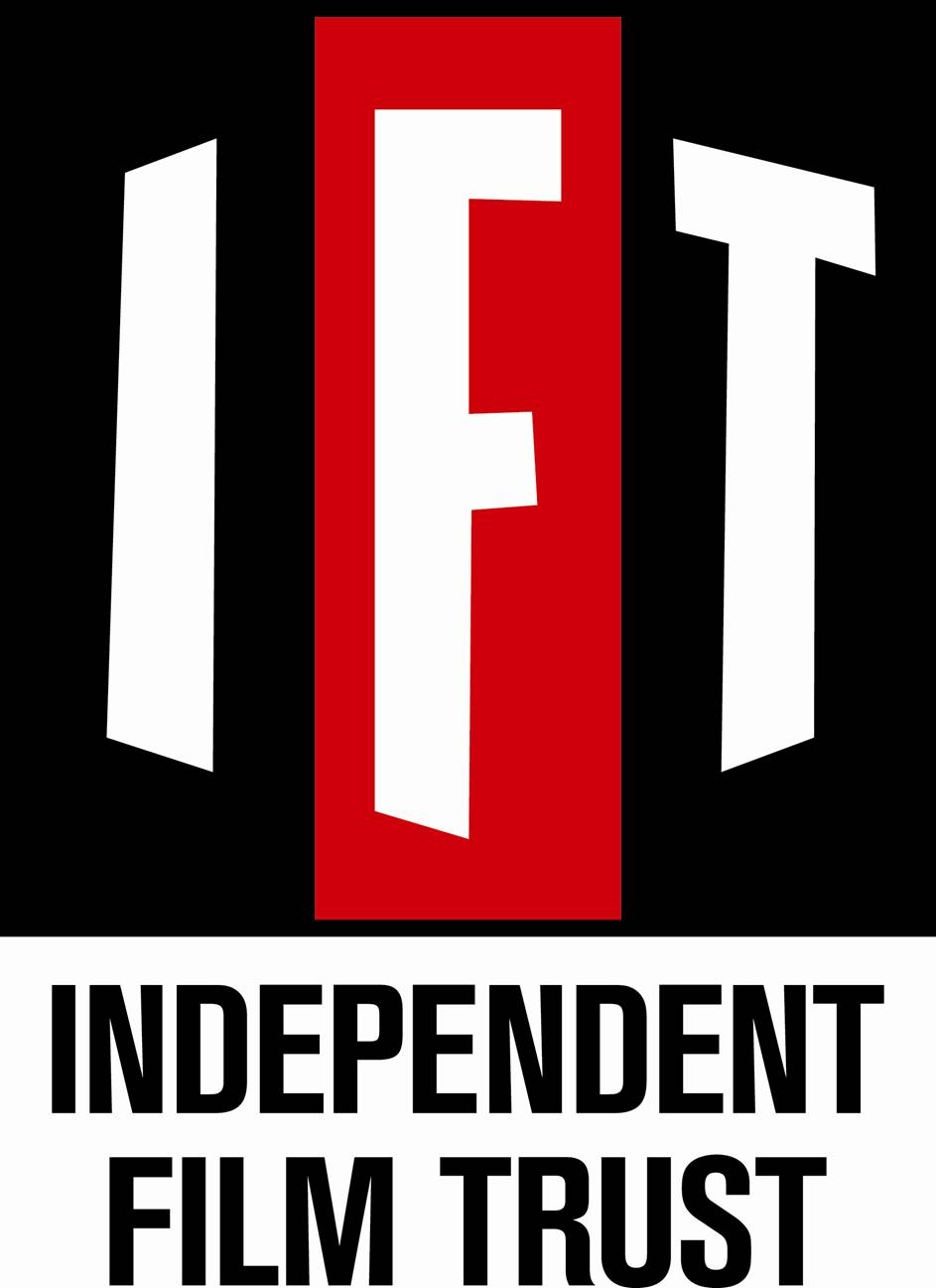
- Type: Non-profit: Private Company Limited by Guarantee
- Founded: 2004; 22 years ago
- Headquarters: London, England, UK
- Website: Official website

The Independent Film Trust (IFT) is a UK-registered charity that was set up to advance the cause of independent film-making. The IFT's work includes film and visual arts training, participatory creative media production, professional mentoring for creative producers and industry research and advocacy for a more representative film and media sector.

Its patrons include Sir Alan Parker, Faye Dunaway, Terence Davies, Bill Forsyth, John Irvin, Mike Leigh, Samantha Morton, Tim Roth and Nick Broomfield.

The IFT supports ventures and initiatives that encourage an interest in film production and viewing and which help emerging film-makers to develop and express themselves, through financing activities such as basic film courses for the disadvantaged, screenings of quality films that did not reach the audience they deserved and the provision of training scholarships for those who have demonstrated talent but need monetary or other help.

== History ==
Founded in 2004 by Elliot Grove, the charity was first chaired in 2006 by Neil McCartney and is run by the board of trustees. In 2017, they appointed Lydia Agbobidi as Chair of the IFT.

It previously worked with groups such as the British Independent Film Awards and the Raindance Film Festival in fostering, promoting and celebrating independent film-making in the UK.

The charity's first film-making course was set up in 2010, when it ran an eight-week programme for adults recovering from mental health issues, working jointly with the Raindance film-making organisation and Westminster Mind. In September one of these films – Night Music, a 12-minute animation by Paul Jacques – was selected for inclusion in the Shorts programme of the Raindance Film Festival.

In 2011, the IFT joined with Raindance and Staffordshire University to set up a programme that leads to an MA or MSc in Film by Negotiated Learning. Raindance/IFT was the first outside body to be validated by the university to deliver such a course, having been approved in August 2012 as a franchise partner.

The creation of an online version of the programme, which was launched in October 2012, makes it available to students based anywhere in the world with access to a broadband internet connection. In theory, a student could progress all the way to a master's degree without ever attending a designated physical location or actually meeting any of their tutors. That is, provided that they had handed in work and projects that met the assignment guidelines and postgraduate requirements (and kept up-to-date on fees). The programme is highly flexible and allows the students to choose their own modules, and design and deliver them through self-directed learning with Raindance supplying support, tutorials and access to its wide and varied range of classes.

In 2018, the IFT launched Talent Led, a professional mentoring scheme for underrepresented artists. Between July - August 2020, the IFT offered free career development coaching and sessions featuring Industry professionals for free to diverse film and creative media individuals. Guest speakers included Composer, Justine Barker, Sound designer, Chad Orororo, Phil Hunt from Head Gear Films / Bohemia Media and IFT Board member Stephanie Charmail who is Head of Production at Shorts TV.
