= Elmira High School =

Elmira High School may refer to:

- Elmira High School (New York)
- Elmira High School (Oregon)
