= Waterloo Central Railway =

Railway in Ontario, Canada

Coordinates: 43.5159°N 80.552768°W

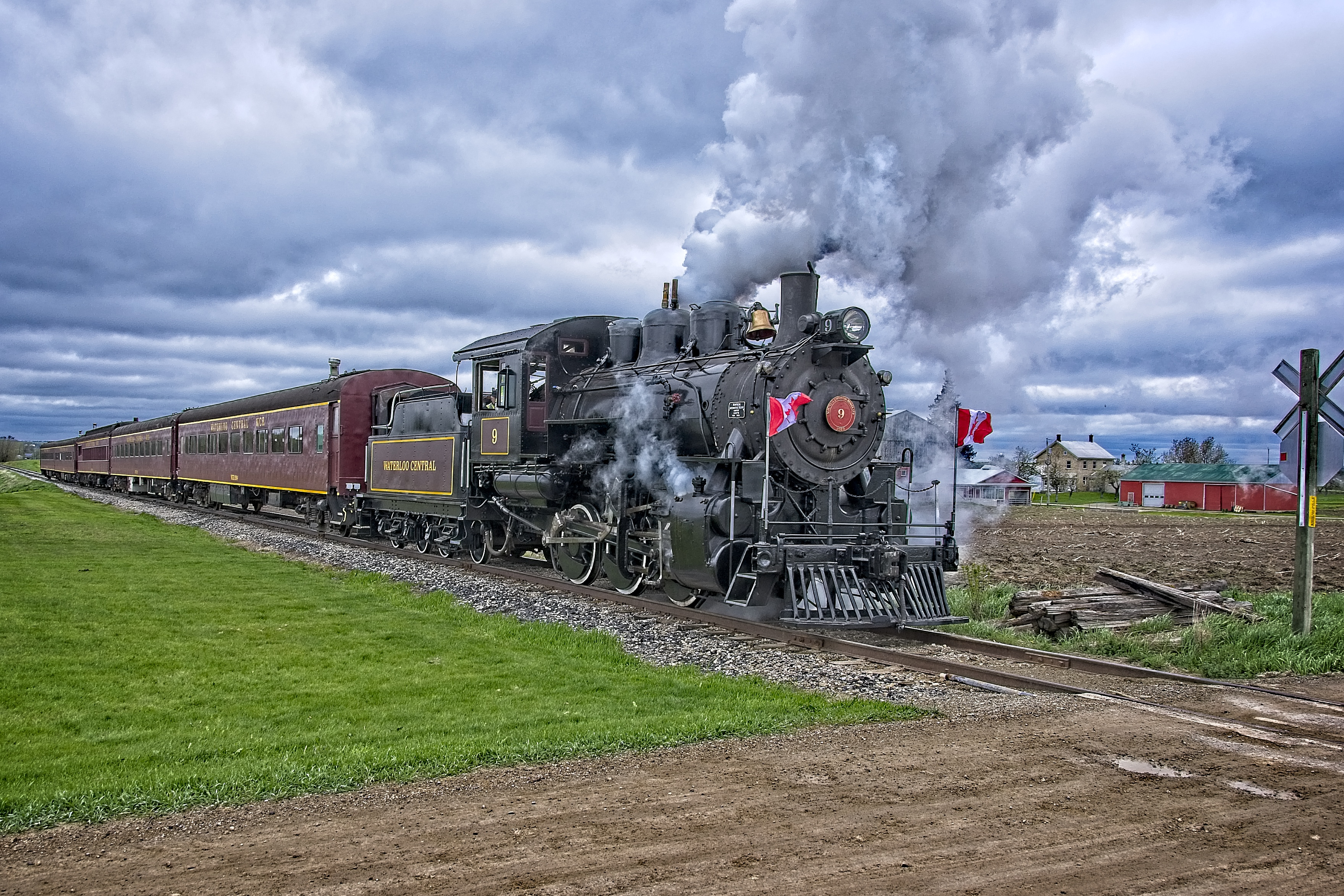
- No. 9 hauling an excursion train on May 20, 2019
- Locale: Ontario
- Terminus: Elmira; St. Jacobs

Commercial operations
- Built by: Waterloo Junction Railway
- Original gauge: 4 ft 8 1/2 in (1,435 mm)

Preserved operations
- Owned by: Track owned by the Region of Waterloo
- Operated by: Southern Ontario Locomotive Restoration Society
- Reporting mark: WCR
- Stations: Elmira; St. Jacobs
- Length: 6 mi (9.7 km)
- Preserved gauge: 4 ft 8 1/2 in (1,435 mm)

Commercial history
- Opened: 1891

Preservation history
- 1921: Canadian National Railway inherits line
- 1990: Canadian National Railway sells line to Waterloo – St. Jacobs Railway
- 1997: Waterloo – St. Jacobs Railway commences operation
- 1999: Waterloo – St. Jacobs Railway ends operation
- 2000: Regional Municipality of Waterloo acquires right-of-way
- 2003: Southern Ontario Locomotive Restoration Society steam tour visits
- 2007: Waterloo Central Railway commences operation
- 2015: Waterloo Central Railway leaves Waterloo and moves operation north to St. Jacobs Farmers Market
- Headquarters: St. Jacobs, Ontario

Website
- www.waterloocentralrailway.com

The Waterloo Central Railway (reporting mark WCR) is a non-profit heritage railway owned and operated by the Southern Ontario Locomotive Restoration Society (SOLRS). In May 2007, SOLRS received joint approval from the Region of Waterloo and the City of Waterloo to run trains from Waterloo to St. Jacobs and potentially as far north as Elmira. On a typical operating day, the train runs three times a day on Tuesdays (June to August), Thursdays (May to October) and Saturdays (April to October). In 2015, the railway lost regular running rights south of Northfield Drive to make way for the Ion light rail project. All Market Train service now runs between St. Jacobs Farmers' Market, the Village of St. Jacobs, and Elmira, Ontario.

The train also runs on certain special events including the Maple Syrup Festival in early April.

== Operations and milestones ==
=== Running rights ===
The WCR operates on the former Canadian National Waterloo Spur now owned by the Region of Waterloo, which connects Elmira, St. Jacobs and Waterloo to Kitchener, Ontario by rail. Through an agreement with the Region of Waterloo, the WCR operates passenger service in daytime hours, and the Canadian National Railway operates freight service in evening hours. From 2007 to 2014, the WCR leased space in the City of Waterloo Visitor and Heritage Information Centre which was formerly owned by the Waterloo-St. Jacobs Railway. As of 2015, the WCR no longer operates south of Northfield Drive.

=== Before 2007 ===
The Waterloo-St. Jacobs Railway operated on the Waterloo Spur between 1997 and 1999. When it ceased operations, the Region of Waterloo purchased the railway right-of-way and the City of Waterloo acquired the railway's modern Waterloo station. SOLRS operated on the line briefly in 2003 as part of a province-wide steam tour in Ontario.

=== 2007–2014 ===
The inaugural season began in 2007 with diesel-hauled service serving Waterloo, St. Jacobs Market and the Village of St. Jacobs on Market Days. ex-Essex Terminal Railway Steam Engine Number 9 was moved along with most of the SOLRS equipment from St. Thomas to Waterloo Region in the fall. Santa Claus trains begin this season as well. The 2008 season added annual excursions to service the Elmira Maple Syrup Festival. In 2010 a restoration and service shop in St. Jacobs allowed for the reactivation of the restoration programme. Ex. ETR #9 was stored under cover for the first time since it arrived from St. Thomas. Ex. CN 79482 caboose was restored as WCR 482 and returned to service. Ex. CNR 50845 Burro Crane and steam locomotive 124 were relocated to St. Jacobs.

The final train departed from Waterloo Station on Sunday, December 14, 2014. No further services will depart from the Waterloo station.

=== 2015–present ===
In 2015, the St. Jacobs Farmers Market Station became the main departure point for all future Market Train departures. The 2017 season began with an excursion to the Elmira Maple Syrup Festival departing from the St. Jacobs Farmers Market station on 1 April 2017.

The Southern Ontario Locomotive Restoration Society also runs a Rail School to teach people certain aspects of train operation. On completion of the full hours of training, graduates can receive Ministry of Transportation Certification as Engineer, Conductor, or Safety Crew.

As of the 2018 season, the railway's southern terminus is Northfield Drive in Waterloo, just north of the Ion system's Northfield station.

== Southern Ontario Locomotive Restoration Society ==
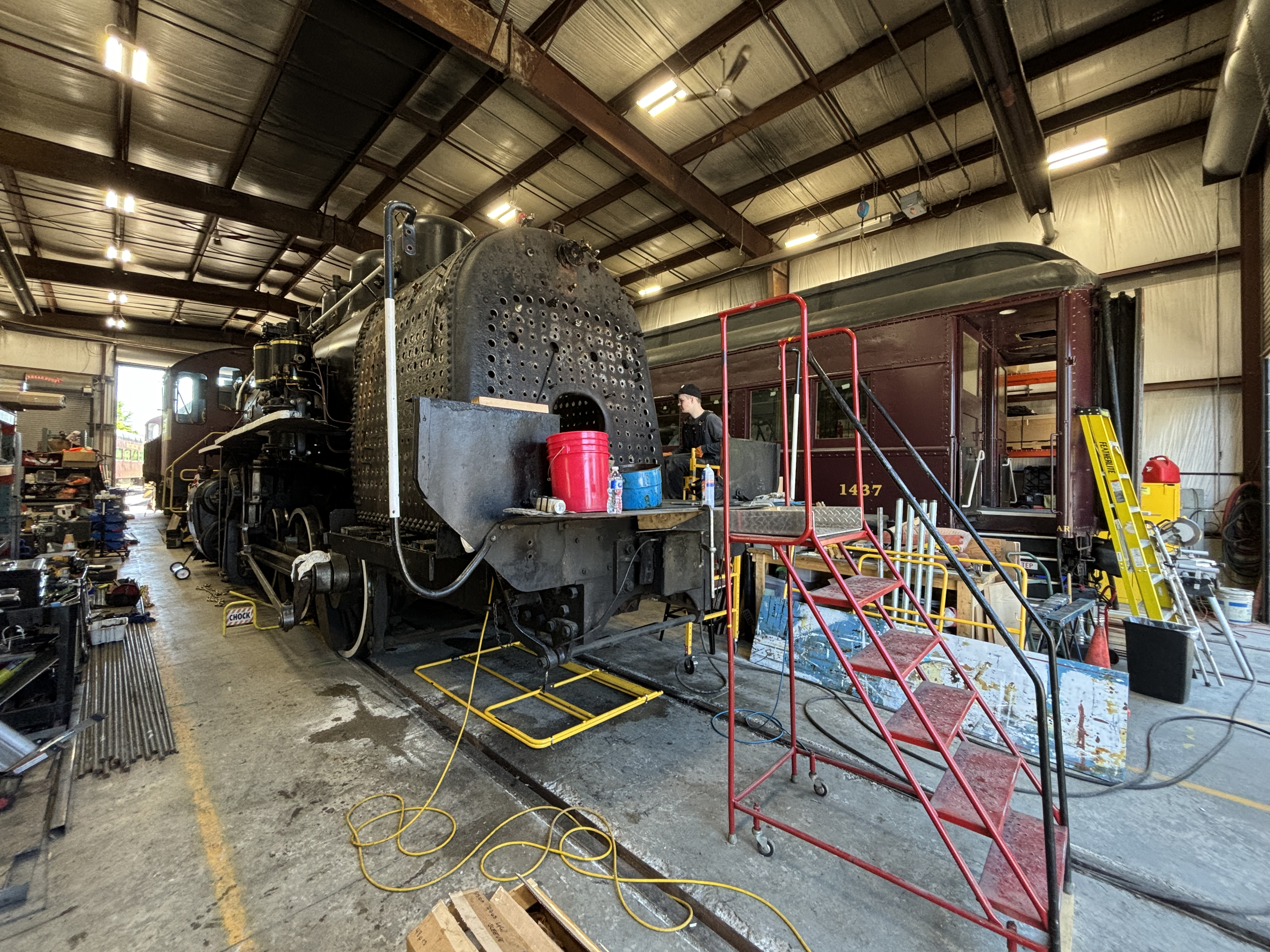
Waterloo Central Railway Maintenance Centre

The Southern Ontario Locomotive Restoration Society (SOLRS) is the parent organization that operates the Waterloo Central Railway. SOLRS became a registered Canadian charity in 1988 and maintains that status today. The mandate of SOLRS is to preserve, restore and operate vintage railway equipment for the education and enjoyment of the public and to present the cultural heritage in a new and more meaningful way to generations past, present and future.

== Restoration shop ==
Construction on a restoration and repair shop in the Village of St. Jacobs was completed in mid-2010.

== Equipment ==
=== Locomotives ===
Locomotive details
Number	Image	Type	Model	Built	Builder	Status
9		Steam	0-6-0	1923	Montreal Locomotive Works	Operational
124		Steam	0-4-0	1930	Canadian Locomotive Company	Under restoration
1001		Diesel	S-13	1959	Montreal Locomotive Works	Operational
1002		Diesel	S-13	1959	Montreal Locomotive Works	Operational
1238		Steam	4-6-2	1946	Montreal Locomotive Works	Stored, awaiting restoration
1012		Diesel	GMD1	1958	General Motors Diesel	Operational
6593		Diesel	S-3	1957	Montreal Locomotive Works	Under maintenance
6111		Buddliner	RDC-1	1956	Budd Company	Under restoration
9072		Buddliner	RDC-1	1958	Budd Company, Canadian Car and Foundry	Stored, awaiting restoration
9109		Buddliner	RDC-1	1956	Budd Company, Canadian Car and Foundry	Stored, awaiting restoration
9114		Buddliner	RDC-1	1957	Budd Company, Canadian Car and Foundry	Operational

=== Former units ===
Locomotive details
Number	Image	Type	Model	Built	Builder	Status
1518		Diesel	95-ton switcher	1956	General Electric	Scrapped
1556		Diesel	70-ton switcher	1950	Canadian Locomotive Company	Sold

=== Rolling stock ===
Rolling stock details
Number	Image	Type	Built	Builder
1437		Coach	1923	Canadian Car and Foundry, Canadian Pacific Angus shops
15000		Lounge car	1923	Canadian Car and Foundry
5628		Coach	1954	Canadian Car and Foundry
5506		Coach	1954	Canadian Car and Foundry
6006		Dining/parlor car	1956	Budd Company
80		Baggage car	1949	Canadian Car and Foundry
81		Baggage car	1949	Canadian Car and Foundry
37		Tanker car	1968	Procor
401752		Bulkhead flatcar	1972	National Steel Car
3709, 3772		Boxcars	1963	National Steel Car
8759		Baggage car	1930	National Steel Car
1042		Caboose	1979	CP Angus shops
61		Caboose	1914	National Steel Car
79482		Caboose	1971	CN Pointe St. Charles shops

== See also ==
- Waterloo – St. Jacobs Railway
- Waterloo Junction Railway
- List of Ontario railways
