= Elliot Grove =

Canadian-born film producer

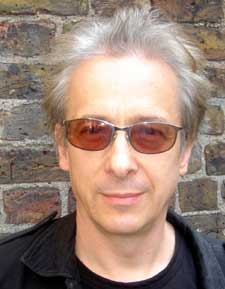
- Born: Canada
- Occupations: screenwriter, film producer

Elliot Grove is a Canadian-born film producer who founded both the Raindance Film Festival in 1993 and the British Independent Film Awards in 1998.

== Early life and education ==
Growing up in a Mennonite household, Grove was unable to watch TV or films. At the age of 16, he watched his first film, Lassie Comes Home, and was subsequently "hooked on cinema forever."

He followed up formal art school training at Central Technical School in Toronto with a series of jobs behind the scenes in the film industry.

== Career ==
In 1992, Grove founded Raindance Film Festival, a festival devoted to promoting independent filmmaking.

He also founded the Independent Film Trust, a charitable organization that empowers children facing disabilities or disadvantaged circumstances to express themselves through the art of filmmaking.

In July 2009, Grove was awarded an honorary doctorate from the Open University at Plymouth College of Art, in recognition of his contribution to education in independent film.

In December 2021, Grove received the Impact Award at the first ever British Short Film Awards.

=== Production ===
Grove's production company operates under the Raindance banner. Upholding the ethos of Raindance, he wrote, produced and directed 1997's feature, Table 5, for just over £200.

== Bibliography ==
- Grove, Elliot (2001). Raindance Writers Lab: How to Write and Sell the Hot Script. Focal Press. ISBN 9780240516363.
- Grove, Elliot (2004). Raindance Producer's Lab Lo-To-No Budget Filmmaking. Vol. 1. Taylor & Francis. ISBN 9780240516998.
