= Raindance Film Festival =

Independent film festival

Raindance Film School and Festival
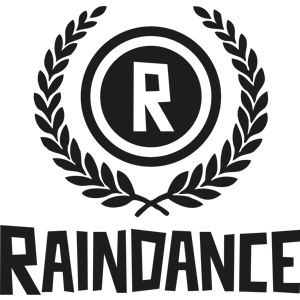
- Locations: London; New York; Vancouver; Montreal; Toronto; Berlin; Brussels; Budapest
- People: Elliot Grove
- Website: raindance.org

Raindance is an independent film festival and film school that operates in major cities including London, Los Angeles, New York, Vancouver, Toronto, Montreal, Budapest, Berlin, and Brussels. Founded in 1992 by Elliot Grove, the festival showcases features and shorts from around the world to an audience of film executives and buyers, journalists, fans and filmmakers.

== Timeline ==
- 1992 – Raindance is founded. Film training courses are offered.
- 1993 – The Raindance Film Festival is launched, World premiere of What's Eating Gilbert Grape.
- 1994 – Pulp Fiction makes its UK debut at Raindance.
- 1998 – Raindance creates the British Independent Film Awards which celebrate the achievements of independent British filmmaking.
- 2000 – Christopher Nolan's Memento has its UK premiere at Raindance.
- 2003 – Raindance launches the world's first 15 Second Shorts Competition with Nokia.
- 2004 – The Independent Film Trust is launched by Raindance, a charity that supports independent filmmaking and provides bursaries and training for the disadvantaged, from children in inner-city schools to refugees and the mentally ill.
- 2008 – Raindance screens Once, which goes on to win the Academy Award for Best Original Song.
- 2009 – Down Terrace, Ben Wheatley's first film, debuts at Raindance.
- 2012 – Short films which play at Raindance become eligible for Oscar nominations.
- 2013 – Raindance launches Raw Talent and produces its film Love.Honour.Obey.
- 2015 – Raindance launches 360/VR Storytelling training.
- 2016 – Raindance launches the Auteur Award and presents the inaugural prize to Ken Loach.
- 2016 – Raindance launches the VRX Awards and Showcase.
- 2017 – Raindance hands the 2nd Annual Auteur Award to Guy Ritchie, describing him as a "prominent figure" who breathed "new life into the British film industry" with his "cult crime comedies."
- 2017 – Raindance celebrated its 25th anniversary.
- 2018 – Raindance hands the 3rd Annual Auteur Award to Terry Gilliam, saying that for four decades, he's been "magicking amazing visual stories from practically nowhere."
- 2025 – Raindance honours Jason Isaacs and Celia Imrie with the Raindance Icon Award.
- 2026 – Raindance honours Miriam Margolyes, Brian Cox and Lloyd Kaufman with the Raindance Icon Award.
