= Home Hardware =

Canadian retail store chain

Home Hardware Stores Ltd.
- Type: Private
- Industry: Retail
- Founded: 1964; 62 years ago St. Jacobs, Ontario, Canada
- Founder: Walter Hachborn; Henry Sittler
- Headquarters: St. Jacobs, Ontario
- Area served: Canada; France
- Key people: Ian White (CEO)
- Products: Retail hardware supplies, lumber and building materials.
- Website: www.homehardware.ca

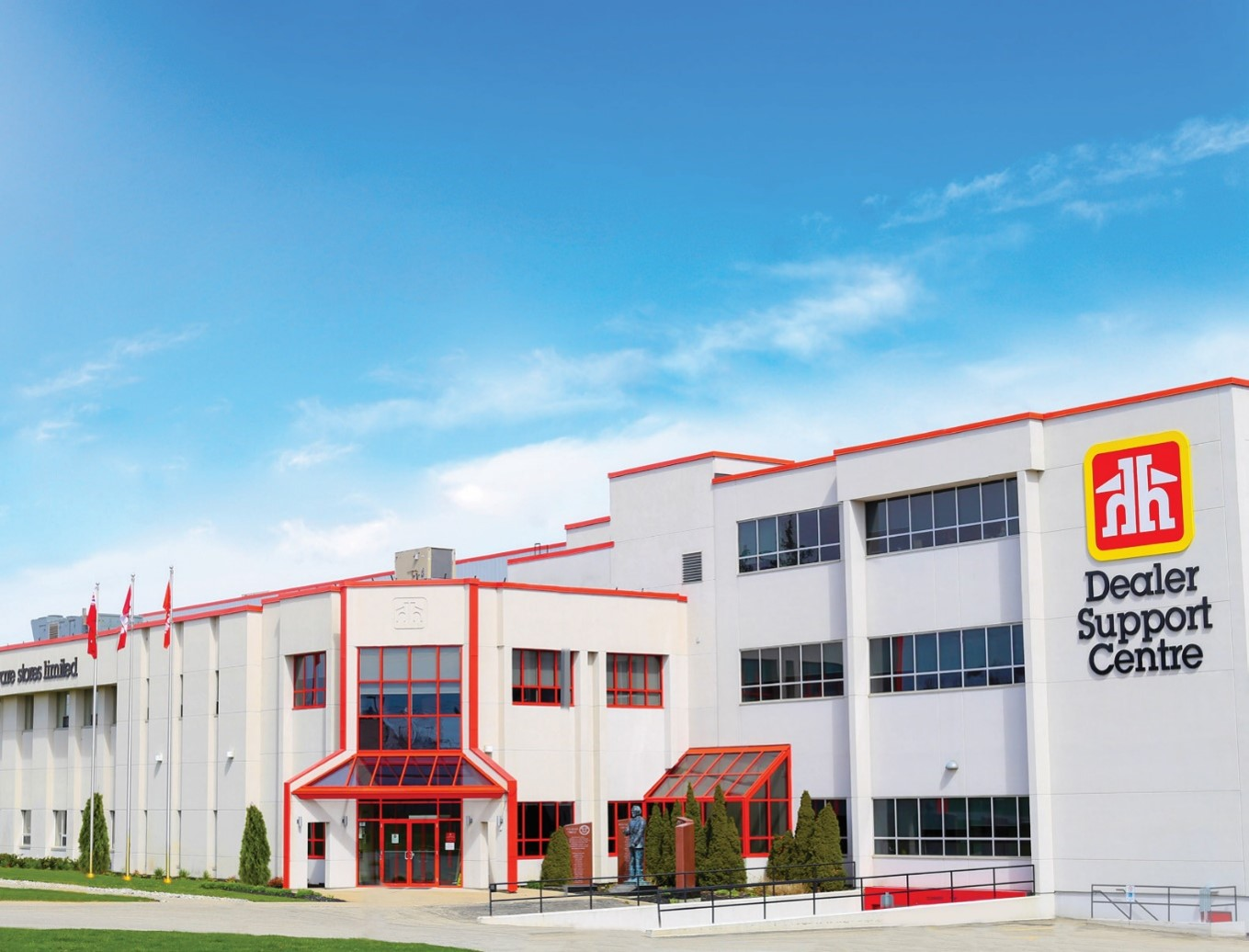
Home Hardware Dealer Support Centre in St. Jacobs, Ontario

Home Hardware Stores Ltd. is an independent home improvement retailer located in Canada. Co-founded by Walter Hachborn in 1964, and headquartered in St. Jacobs, Ontario, the company is Canadian and the country's largest dealer-owned and operated home improvement retailer with more than 1,000 locations serving communities across Canada with one location located in the French overseas territory of Saint Pierre and Miquelon.

== History ==
Walter Hachborn and his partner Henry Sittler organized the first meeting of independent store owners at a hotel in Kitchener, Ontario in 1963. On January 1, 1964, 122 independent Ontario hardware retailers purchased Hollinger Hardware Limited in St. Jacobs, Ontario, resulting in the formation of a 100% dealer-owned business model.

On November 9, 1967, Home Hardware’s name and logo became official. In 1981, Home Hardware merged with western-Canada-based Link Hardware to create a national chain.

Home Hardware Stores Limited expanded through the purchase of Beaver Lumber in 1999 after acquiring the chain from Molson Brewery for $68 million.

== Leadership ==
Founding CEO Walter Hachborn retired from the day-to-day operations in 1988. He held the title of President Emeritus until his passing on December 17, 2016, at the age of 95.

Paul Straus joined Home Hardware Stores Limited in 1964. He held various roles during his tenure with the company, including Vice-President Controller, and Vice-President, Finance and Administration. In 1989, Paul was named Executive Vice-President and General Manager. Ten years later, he was appointed Vice-President and Chief Executive Officer. Paul retired in 2018 but remained on as a company consultant.

Terry Davis started at Home Hardware Stores Limited in 1970. He held executive roles from 1990 to 2000, including Vice-President, Marketing, and Vice-President, Dealer Development. In 2007, Terry was appointed Vice-President, Administration and Strategic Planning. In 2014, Terry was named Chief Executive Officer. He was appointed President and Chief Executive Officer in 2018 but announced his retirement later that year.

On October 10, 2018, Home Hardware Stores Limited appointed Kevin Macnab as the company’s President and Chief Executive Officer. Kevin announced his departure in 2024.

Ian White was appointed as Home’s Chief Executive Officer in November of 2024, and he continues to lead the company today.

== Distribution centres ==
Home Hardware has four distribution centres located across Canada: St. Jacobs, Ontario; Elmira, Ontario; Debert, Nova Scotia; and Wetaskiwin, Alberta. Approximately 2.5 million square feet of combined warehousing space holds over 50,000 products.

== Brands ==
Home Hardware private label brands include:

- BeautiTone
- Benchmark
- Mosaic
- OmniMax
- InStyle
- Natura
- Radley

== Awards ==
Awards granted to Home Hardware Stores Limited include:

- Canada’s Best Managed Companies, 2012-2025
- Canada’s Best Employers for Diversity, Forbes, 2023-2024
- Canada’s Best Employers, Forbes, 2021-2026
- Private Fleet Safety Award, Private Motor Truck Council of Canada, 10-time Large Fleet Winner
- Canada’s Top Fleet Employers, Trucking HR Canada, 2013-2025
- Canada's Top Fleet Employers of Distinction 12+ Years, Trucking HR Canada, 2025
- Canada’s Most Trusted Home Retailer, Gustavson Brand Trust Index, 2021-2022
- Waterloo Area’s Top Employers, 2021-2023
- Canada’s Most Reputable Companies, Leger, 2022
- Top Hardware Retailer, Leger, 2021
