= John Motz =

German-Canadian newspaper editor, politician

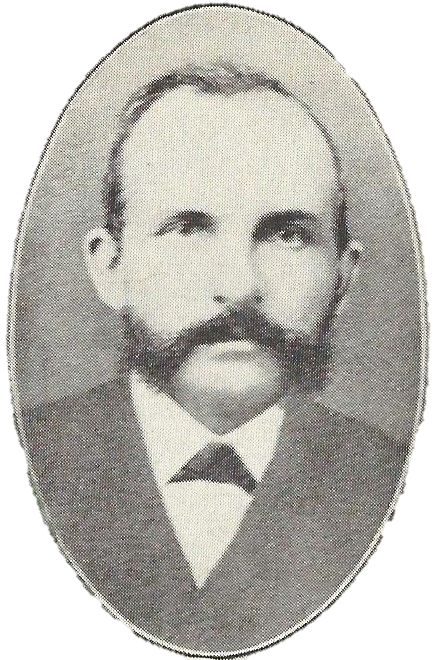
- Motz, undated

Mayor of Berlin
- In office July 1880 – December 1881
- Preceded by: Louis Breithaupt
- Succeeded by: Jacob Yost Shantz

Personal details
- Born: Johannes Motz; 5 June 1830 Diedorf, near Mühlhausen, Prussia
- Died: 29 October 1911 (aged 81) Berlin, Ontario, Canada
- Party: Liberal
- Children: Five, including William John Motz
- Profession: Newspaper proprietor; editor; sheriff; tailor

John Motz (born Johannes Motz; 5 June 1830 – 29 October 1911) was a Canadian politician, German-language newspaper proprietor, sheriff and tailor. Born near Mühlhausen in the Province of Saxony, Prussia (today part of Thuringia, Germany), he immigrated to Berlin, Canada West (now Kitchener, Ontario) in 1848. In 1859, he and fellow immigrant Friedrich Rittinger founded the Berliner Journal, a German-language newspaper based in Berlin. Motz served as its editor for the next forty years before retiring in 1899, becoming the honorary sheriff of Waterloo County, a position he held until his death in 1911.

Motz was engaged in local politics and the community. He was first elected to public office in 1870, serving on the Berlin Town Council. He was elected mayor of Berlin in July 1880 following the death of mayor Louis Breithaupt. Motz won re-election in January 1881. In his role as Journal editor, he denounced the anti-liberal trends of late-19th century Germany while promoting German culture and customs locally, including advocating for the teaching of German in Ontario schools and overseeing the dedication of a bust of Kaiser Wilhelm I in Berlin's Victoria Park.

== Early years ==
The son of Johannes Motz and Margaretha Schroeter, John Motz was born on 5 June 1830 in Diedorf, near Mühlhausen in the Province of Saxony, Prussia (today part of Thuringia, Germany). (Note: He was baptized as Johannes Motz.) Motz's sister Regina immigrated to Upper Canada in 1846. Expecting that his older brother would inherit the family's property in Saxe-Coburg and Gotha, Motz left for Canada as well. He landed in Quebec City in June 1848 and joined his sister in the heavily German town of Berlin, Canada West.

In Berlin, he briefly worked as a farm-hand and a shingle cutter before beginning an apprenticeship as a tailor in 1850 under Christian Nahrgang. After three years of apprenticing, he opened his own tailoring business in the nearby villages of Petersburg and St. Jacobs. Taken by stories of the American frontier, Motz left for the United States in 1857. Travelling to and working in Rock Island, Illinois, and Davenport, Iowa, he returned to Waterloo County in the autumn of 1857.

== Career ==
=== Berliner Journal ===
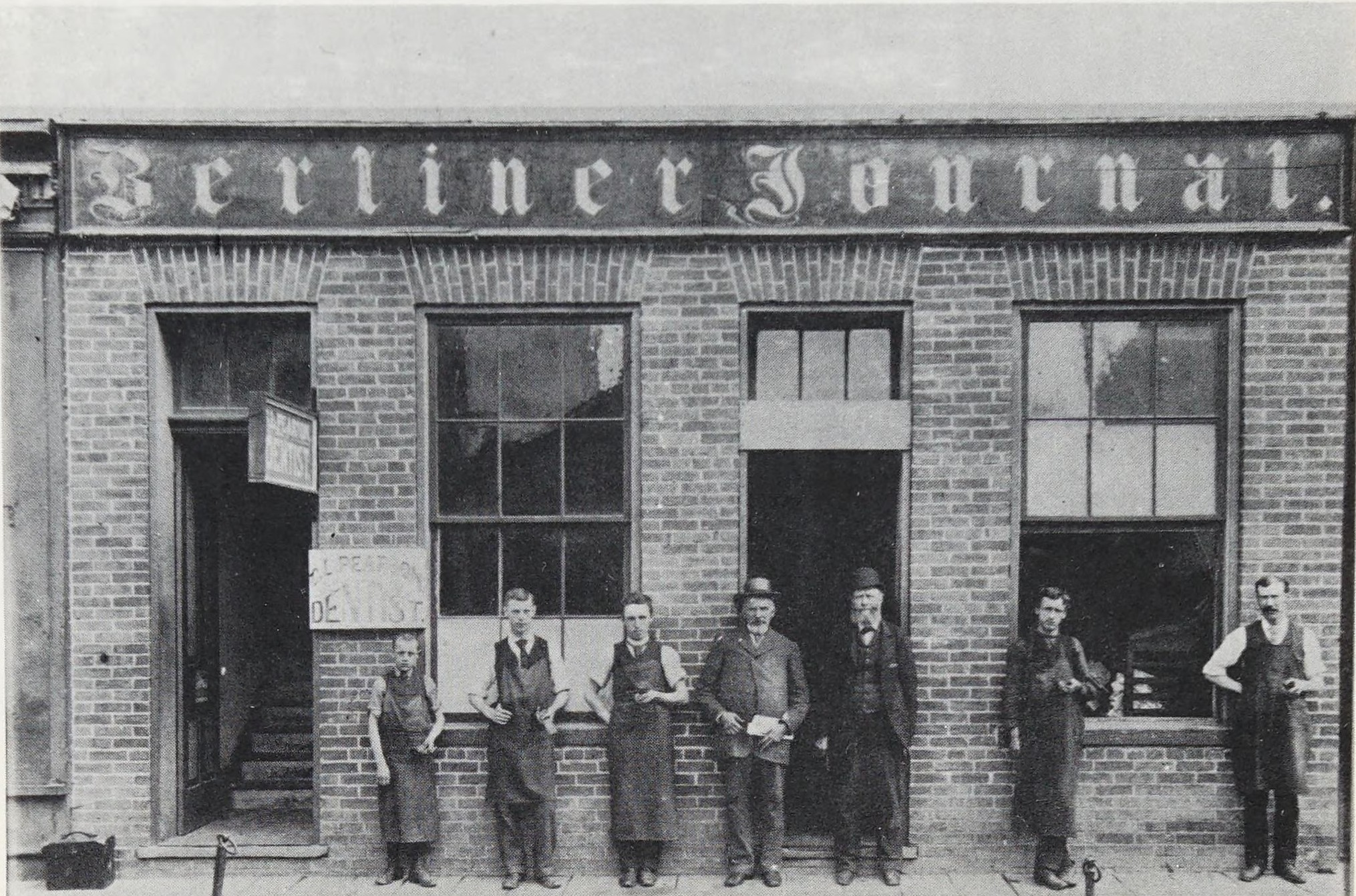
John Motz (middle) in front of the Berliner Journal printing office, c. 1889. He stands with William John Motz (third left) and Friedrich Rittinger (third right).

Motz achieved Canadian naturalization in December 1858. That same year, he began attending a Berlin grammar school to master the English language and train for a teaching career. He abandoned his teaching pursuits after he struck a friendship with fellow German immigrant Friedrich Rittinger, the printing manager of two Berlin newspapers, the German-language Der Deutsche Canadier and the English-language Telegraph. The two hoped to operate a German-language newspaper and negotiated for purchase of Der Deutsche Canadier. After its owner refused to sell, the two founded the Berliner Journal in 1859. Rittinger provided technical expertise as printer and technical manager, while Motz served as the newspaper's editor, writer and business manager.

While Berlin's English language papers wrote about Canadian and municipal political news, Motz focused the Journal's coverage on issues concerning local German Canadians, especially foreign news and local German culture. The Journal quickly became successful, and remained so over several decades, something scholar Herbert Karl Kalbfleisch credits to the strong combination of Rittinger's expertise as a technical director and Motz's "facile pen".

As the paper's editor, Motz believed it important for the press and social organizations to cooperate on shared causes, evidenced by the Journal pushing for German to be taught in Ontario schools and the promotion of German cultural events. (Note: Professor Werner Entz writes that Rittinger and Motz entered the newspaper business less conscious of making a profit than of making an impact through their journalism.) In an 1859 editorial, Motz called for religious tolerance and freedom, writing he intended to keep the Journal out of religious matters. He further explained he intended the newspaper to be neutral in discussion of politics, though slightly leaning towards the Reform Party. In other pieces, he encouraged the paper's readers to be politically active and provided instructions on how to become a British subject so that they may vote. Despite his promise to be generally neutral in political discussions, the paper reliably supported the policies of the Reform Party's successor, the Liberal Party. As anti-liberal trends expanded in Germany in the end of the 19th century, he critiqued the German government's actions, especially the lack of both parliamentary rights and freedom of speech.

=== Political and community activity ===
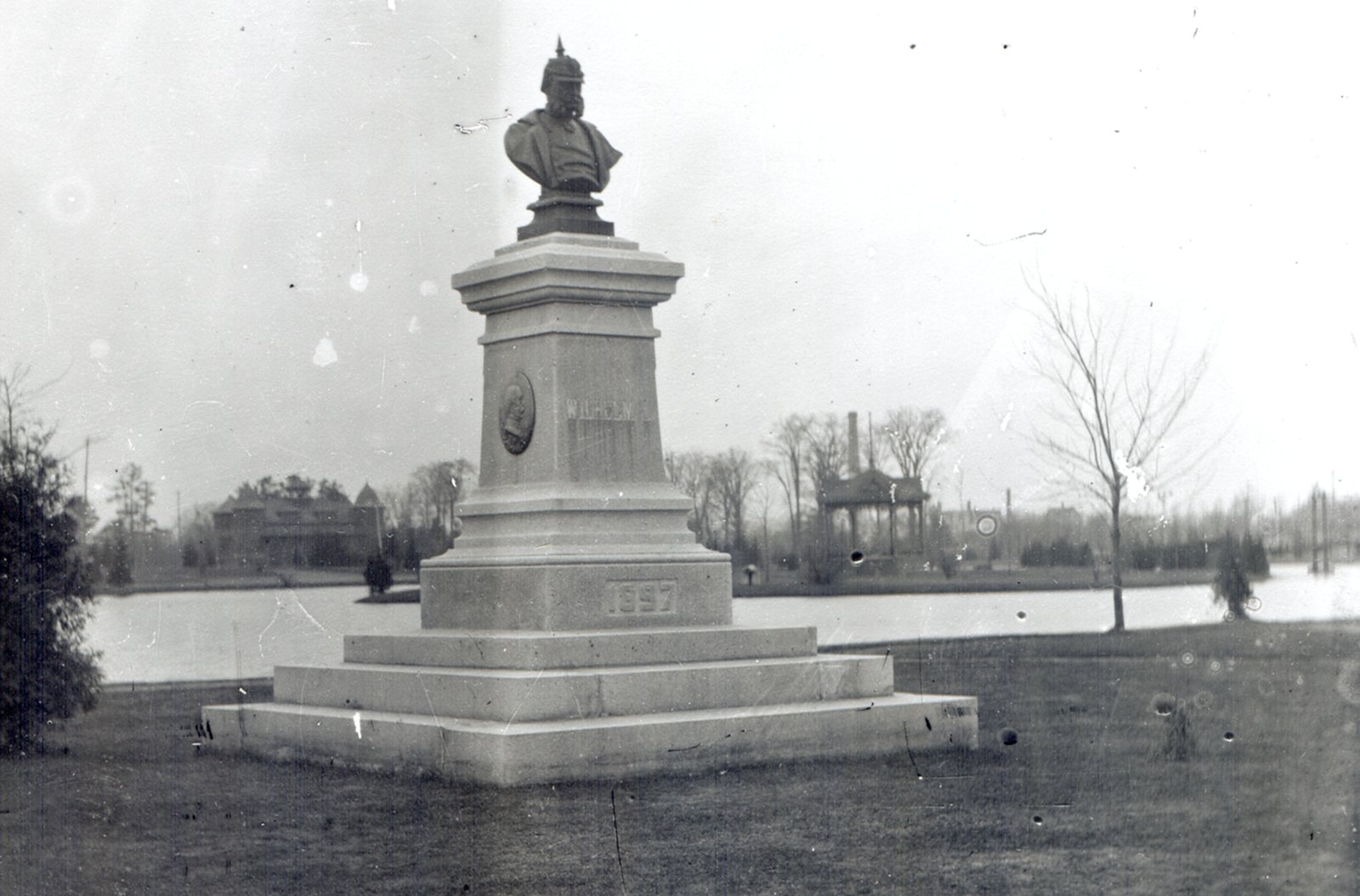
A bust of Kaiser Wilhelm I in Berlin's Victoria Park, 1905. Motz served on the committee which led its 1897 dedication.

Motz was a community leader in Berlin, engaged in local politics. He served on the boards of multiple local businesses and was appointed chairman of the Berlin Free Library's board of management, holding the position from 1888 through 1889. As a publisher of the Berliner Journal, he was active with both the German Canadian Press Association and the Canadian Press Association, becoming the former's president in 1872. He was first elected to public office in 1870 or 1871, serving on the Berlin Town Council, as well as being elected deputy reeve. (Note: The City of Berlin's 1912 book, Berlin: Celebration of Cityhood, writes he was on the council "for a number of years". Richardson writes he was elected to Berlin Town Council in 1870 and "later served as deputy reeve". Historian W. V. Uttley writes the first town council was elected in January 1871, and that it was at this time Motz was elected deputy reeve.) The death of Berlin mayor Louis Breithaupt in July 1880 necessitated a new election, which Motz won. Motz won re-election in January 1881, serving for the remainder of the year. Involved in national politics, Motz was politically active with the Reform party, serving as vice-president and later president of the Reform Association of North Waterloo. From the late 1890s through the early 1900s, he exchanged letters with Canadian Prime Minister Sir Wilfrid Laurier, many of which were regarding patronage.

Motz participated in local children's charities, including founding and serving as president of the St. Boniface Sick Society. He was a member of the local Concordia Club and the Horticultural Society, the former dedicated to the promotion of German culture, especially its language, customs and music. Serving on the high school board in 1881, Motz used his editorship to promote the teaching of the German language in local schools. (Note: German-language instruction was brought into elementary and secondary schools in Ontario's German communities in the late nineteenth century. Kalbfleisch credits their introduction to "the strong pressure exerted by the Journal and other German newspapers." The programs experienced success until anti-German sentiments associated with the First World War resulted in their removal.) Following the 1870 Franco-Prussian War, Motz, along with community leader and future Waterloo North MP Hugo Kranz, founded a "German patriotic relief organization", which raised one thousand dollars towards "the wounded and widows and orphans of the German armies". In 1897, the Concordia Club planned celebrations for the twenty-fifth anniversary of the end of the war, planning to dedicate a bust of Kaiser Wilhelm I in Berlin's Victoria Park. Several community leaders served on the monument committee, including manufacturer George Rumpel, Deutsche Zeitung editor Hans Sikorski and Concordia Club president Karl Müller, while Motz served as the committee's president. Government support for the project was strong, Laurier ensuring the bust entered Canada duty-free. At the 13 August unveiling, Motz spoke of the importance of cultivating the German language in local schools and churches. He emphasized that, in order to be a good Canadian citizen, one needed to honour the customs of one's mother country. He expressed that while the celebrants honoured "the land of our birth and its famous Emperor ... [they were] good citizens of Canada and loyal subjects of Queen Victoria ... [who] did not wish to establish a sectional state in this land". He concluded saying: "We want to be what we have always been; we want to be hard-working, honourable men, peaceful, law-abiding citizens, and loyal subjects of the Dominion of Canada." Scholar Gottlieb Leibbrandt writes the speech had a considerable impact in the town, with Motz's Journal reporting it "went to the very marrow".

== Personal life ==
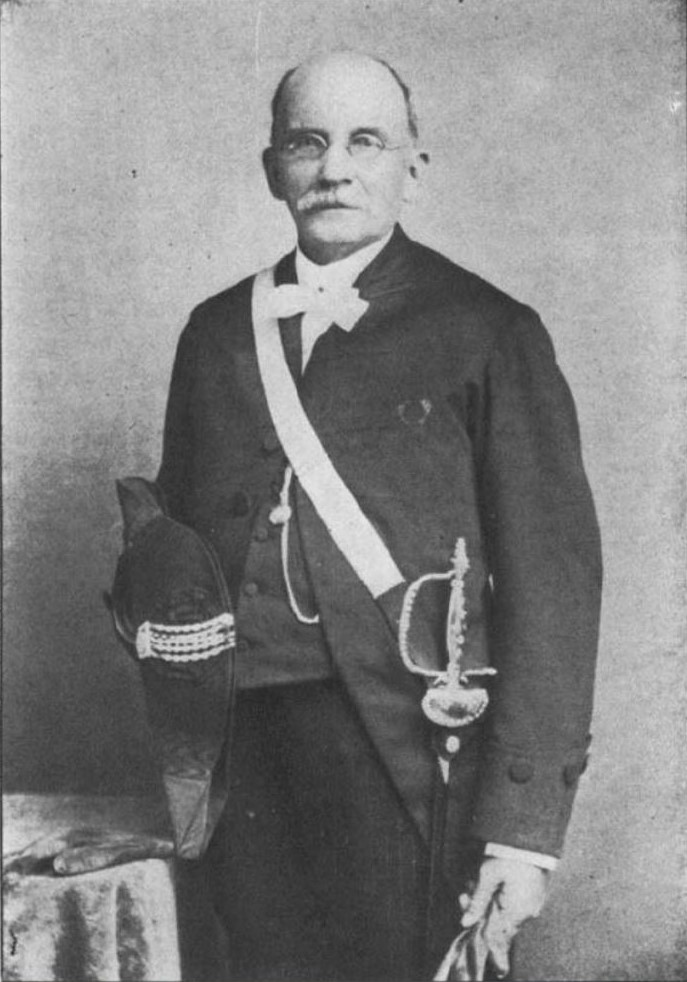
Motz in uniform, c. 1899–1911. He retired from his editorship at the Berliner Journal in 1899, becoming the honorary sheriff of Waterloo County.

Motz married Helena Vogt in Berlin on 17 February 1868. They had three daughters and two sons, including William John Motz. In 1899, Motz retired from his editorship, becoming honorary sheriff of Waterloo County, serving in the position from 1899 until his death. (Note: Historian Lynn Elizabeth Richardson writes Motz was appointed sheriff in 1890, but that he retired from the Journal in 1899. Historian Patricia P. McKegney writes he both left the Journal and became sheriff in 1899. Kalbfleisch writes he retired as editor in 1899 and was subsequently appointed sheriff. The City of Berlin's 1912 book, Berlin: Celebration of Cityhood, writes he was appointed sheriff in January 1900.) A large banquet was held in his honour that year, celebrated with a series of fourteen speeches.

Motz was a devout Roman Catholic and member of Berlin's St. Mary's parish. Though Rittinger was a member of the Lutheran Church, the two remained tolerant of each other's religions. After Motz retired, his and Rittinger's sons took over the Berliner Journal in 1899, William John Motz serving as local editor, Herman Rittinger the technical publisher-director and, beginning in 1904, John Adam Rittinger as editor-in-chief. Even though he no longer worked there, Motz occasionally contributed to the Journal, submitting anecdotes that he read in German-American dailies. He died in Berlin on 29 October 1911.

== See also ==
- List of mayors of Kitchener, Ontario
- List of German language newspapers of Ontario
- Media related to John Motz at Wikimedia Commons
