= Berliner Journal =

German-language newspaper in Canada

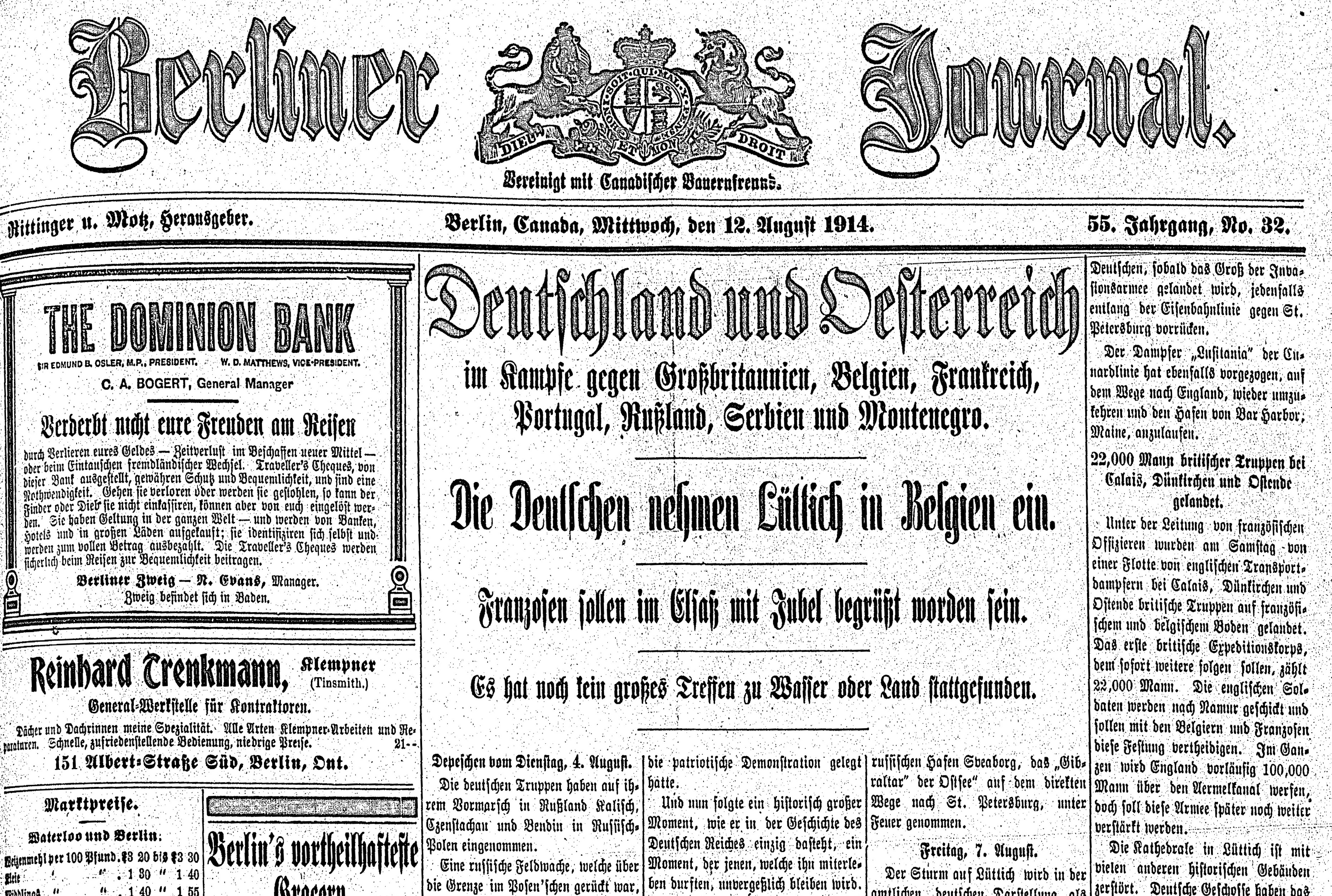
- Top of the Berliner Journal front page, 12 August 1914, reporting on the outbreak of the First World War in Europe
- Type: Weekly newspaper
- Founders: John Motz; Friedrich Rittinger
- Publisher: Rittinger & Motz printing firm
- Founded: 1859
- Ceased publication: 1918
- Language: German (English after October 1918)
- Headquarters: Berlin (renamed Kitchener in 1916)
- Circulation: 5,155 (1908)
- OCLC number: 1147283368

The Berliner Journal (later the Ontario Journal) was a German-language weekly-newspaper published in Berlin, Canada (later Kitchener), from 1859 to 1918. The newspaper was founded by the German immigrants Friedrich Rittinger and John Motz, who operated the paper together through most of its existence until their sons – William John Motz, Herman Rittinger and John Adam Rittinger – took over the operation at the turn of the century.

German speakers made up a large segment of those immigrating to Canada in the 19th century, and demand for German-language publications in Upper Canada was high. When founded, the Berliner Journal was one of several German-language newspapers in Ontario. By 1908, competitors had either ceased publication or amalgamated into it, making the Journal one of only two German papers in Ontario and the most widely read in Canada. At its peak, circulation was around 5,000 with a readership spanning the country and extending into the northern United States.

The outbreak of the First World War led to rising anti-German sentiment in Canada. After Berlin changed its name to Kitchener in 1916, the newspaper was renamed the Ontario Journal in January 1917. A 1918 Order in Council prohibiting the use of "enemy languages" in Canadian publications led the Journal to publishing only in English beginning in October 1918 and then folding altogether that December. (Note: Sources disagree on the Ontario Journal's date of closure. Scholars Anne Löchte, John English and Kenneth McLaughlin write it ceased publication in 1918 without specifying a month, while Herbert Karl Kalbfleisch and Gottlieb Leibbrandt write it ceased after the order-in-council passed on 2 October 1918. Patricia P. McKegney instead writes the order-in-council passed on 25 September 1918 and that the newspaper ended on 2 October 1918. By contrast, Barbara Lorenzkowski writes the Journal ran its first English-only issue on 9 October 1918, and both her and Werner A. Bausenhart quote from December 1918 issues of Journal. WorldCat indicates the last issue ran on 10 May 1924, and the Waterloo Region Record's website implies the paper closed in 1924, writing that after its 1859 founding it "[continued] for the next 65 years". An anonymous piece in the 1959 edition of the Waterloo Historical Society's Annual Volume writes that in 1919 the owners of the Journal sold their 15 Queen St. S. publishing office and then "joined forces with" the News Record. Historian and archivist Arthur Grenke similarly writes that the Journal and Record "joined forces" in 1919. The 1919 edition of Vernon's City of Kitchener and Town of Waterloo Directory lists the Ontario Journal as being at 15 Queen St. S., while the 1920 edition lists it as being at 49 King St. W., the same address as the News Record. The Journal continued to appear in subsequent editions of the directory, up to and including 1924–25, but does not appear in the 1925–26 edition.)

== Origins: 1859–1899 ==
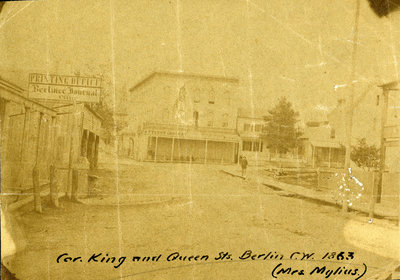
At left, the Berliner Journal printing office, 1863

=== Founding and early years ===
Friedrich Rittinger from Michaelbach, Baden, and John Motz from Diedorf, near Mühlhausen, founded the Berliner Journal in Berlin, Canada West, in 1859. German publications were in high demand, with Germans then the third-largest immigrant group in Canada after the English and French. (Note: Before the unification of Germany in 1871, the use of "German" did not refer to a single nation state. Those who immigrated to Canada before the unification understood that their family had left an area of what became the German nation state or from an area that shared its culture and language.) As a weekly newspaper, the Journal began as one of several German-language newspapers in Canada West. By 1867, there were 18 German-language newspapers in Southwestern Ontario, and in any year between 1859 and 1908, Waterloo County usually had four German newspapers, and always between three and five.

Soon after his arrival in Berlin in 1848, Rittinger worked in the mechanical department of Der Deutsche Canadier – a well-established German-language newspaper – being responsible for printing copies of the newspaper. When he and Motz decided they wanted to get into the newspaper business in 1859, they initially tried to negotiate for the purchase of the Canadier. After the owner refused to sell, Rittinger – who was now head of the mechanical department – left to found the Journal with Motz. Upon its founding, the Journal became involved in a bitter feud with the Canadier, with the Canadier mocking the Journal, suggesting it would not make it beyond one issue. Feuds between rival newspapers were common in nineteenth century Ontario, especially between direct competitors like the Journal and Canadier.

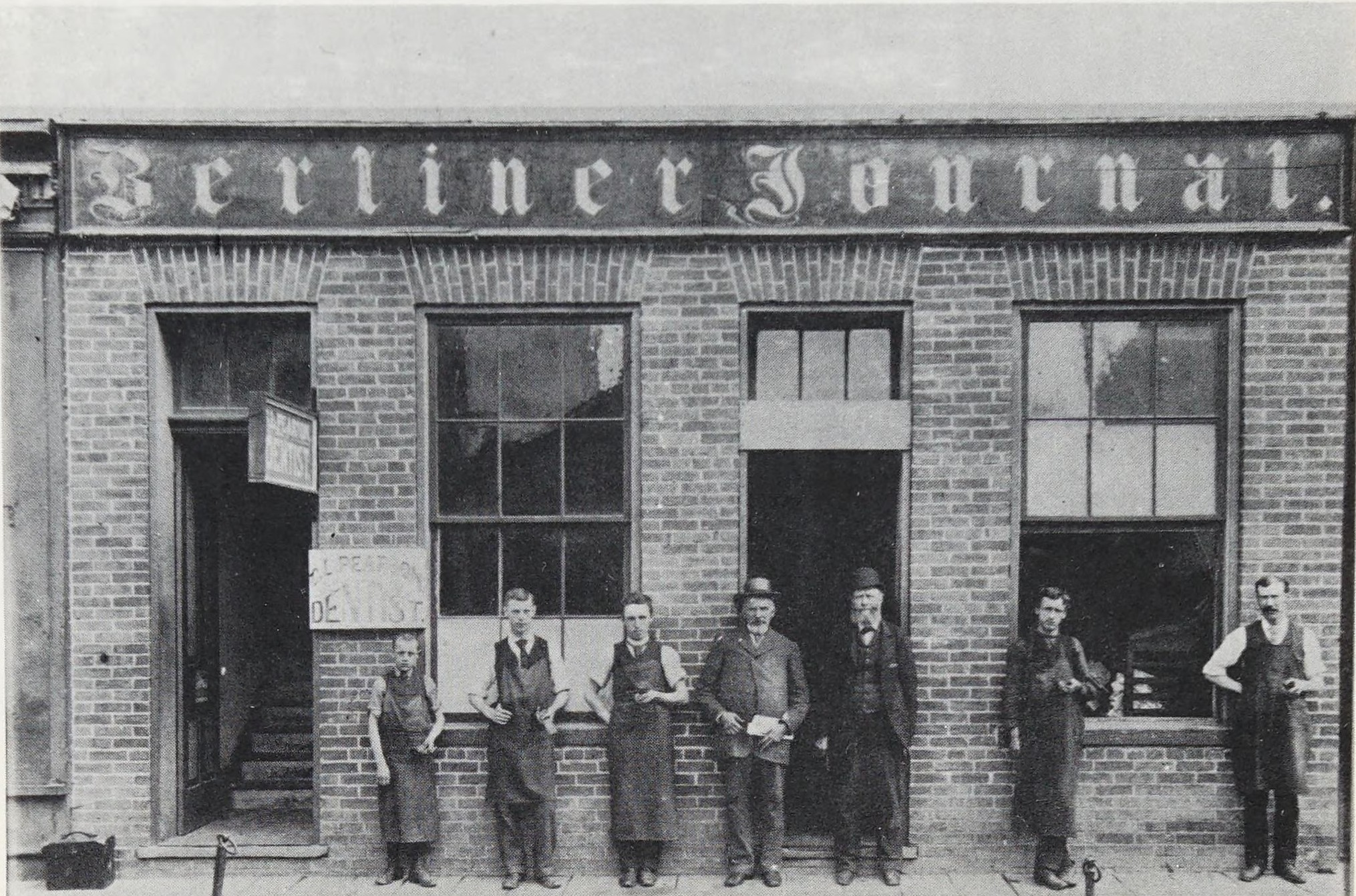
The printing office at 42 King Street West, c. 1889; from the left, Herman Rittinger, William John Motz, John Motz and Friedrich Rittinger stand second through fifth

The first issue of the Journal ran on 29 December 1859 and included four-pages on 26 × 20 inch paper. Rittinger acquired German types from Joseph Unzicker of nearby Hamilton by providing a promissory note against Unzicker's recently failed newspaper. The first issue was typeset at Rittinger's home in downtown Berlin using a handpress provided by the Berlin Chronicle, a local English newspaper. (Note: In present day Kitchener, Rittinger's home was located near the corner of Queen and Weber Streets.) They delivered 600 copies of the first issue to both paying and prospective subscribers. For subsequent issues, the Chronicle provided the Journal with work space at their office. (Note: Kalbflesich writes that the Chronicle's office served as the Journal's "for some time" but does not specify a time period. When the Journal's printing office was photographed c. 1889 he specifies its address as "King Street West". The Kitchener Public Library is more precise, describing it as 42 King Street West on the north side of the street.) In the absence of copyright laws, the paper's content included columns reprinted verbatim from German sources – especially the German-American dailies Wechselblätter and Texas Vorwärts – as well as material translated from the English-Canadian press. Motz and Rittinger edited the translated pieces, removing content they thought sensationalist and which "the average German could only poorly digest". The paper was printed by hand and – with neither postal nor railway service yet available – delivered on horseback. Subscribers scattered across the countryside required the horse rider to swim across both the Grand and Conestogo Rivers. By 1863, the paper's circulation was around 1,000. The Canadier found it increasingly difficult to compete with the Journal and folded in January 1865. Following the closure, an article published in the Journal mocked its former competitor, framed as an obituary recounting a person's slow decline in health.

Professor Werner Entz writes that Rittinger and Motz entered the newspaper business less conscious of making a profit than of making an impact through their journalism. Both expressed their desire to be recognized as the best German newspaper in Canada and were quick to notice praise. A piece speaking favourably of the Journal published in the Deutsche Roman-Zeitung of Berlin, Prussia, was reprinted in its entirety in the Journal. Scholar Herbert Karl Kalbfleisch reflects that the quick success of the Journal reflected the strong combination of Rittinger's experience as a technical director and Motz's "facile pen". As the paper's editor, Motz believed it important for the press and social organizations to cooperate on shared causes, evidenced by the Journal pushing for German to be taught in Ontario schools and the promotion of German cultural events; in 1897, Motz, along with community leader George Rumpel, headed the committee in charge of the dedication of a bust of Kaiser Wilhelm I in Berlin's Victoria Park. Following the 1870 Franco-Prussian War, Motz, along with community leader and future Waterloo North MP Hugo Kranz, founded a "German patriotic relief organization", which raised one thousand dollars towards "the wounded and widows and orphans of the German armies".

=== Early coverage ===
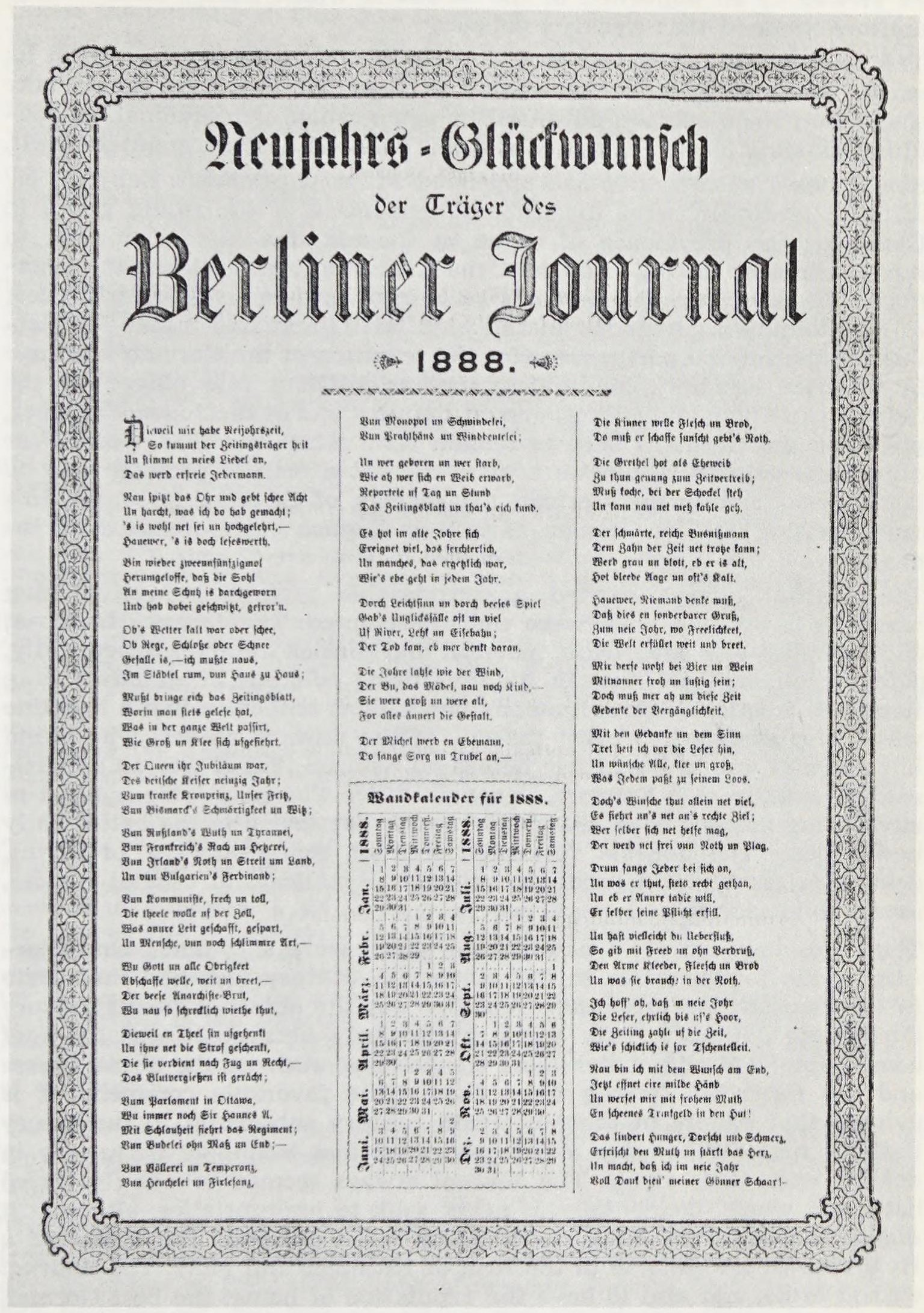
Most German newspapers in Ontario issued an annual broadside with a long poem to celebrate the New Year. The Berliner Journal's poem of 1888 (pictured) was written in the local Pennsylvania German dialect.

While Berlin's English language papers wrote about Canadian and municipal political news, the Journal focused primarily on foreign news along with working to cultivate local German culture. The newspaper covered events relating to Germany alongside German literary prose and poetry. From 1860 through 1914, the paper published German language lessons to generate further German pride, nearly two-thirds of which had been previously published in German-American newspapers. The paper discussed Canada–United States relations and provided news on the American Civil War. The editors made clear that the paper supported the Union, speaking favourably of Abraham Lincoln and German Americans Carl Schurz, Franz Sigel and Louis Blenker.

Like most German-American and German-Canadian newspapers, the Journal's coverage of Germany was sympathetic and supportive of their various war efforts, something apparent in the newspaper's early reporting of the Danish-Prussian and Austro-Prussian Wars. News of the 1870 Franco-Prussian War and German unification in 1870–71 dominated the paper's coverage; readers desperate to know about the conclusion of battles travelled "many miles on foot, or by vehicle, to procure their copy of the Journal at the press." Historian Barbara Lorenzkowski writes that, by covering the homeland's military victories and subsequent celebrations of peace, the Journal "[inserted] its readers into a festive space that transcended national boundaries", allowing German immigrants in North America to "[re-enact] the very rituals celebrated by the 'German brethren' in the Fatherland".

Most Berliners had immigrated to Canada before the Völkisch movement arose in the late 19th century, leading to a community generally less infatuated with German nationalism than those who immigrated after the 1870s. The Journal still had occasional fits of nationalism, seen in editorials suggesting that German victory over France in the Franco-Prussian War was due in part to cultural and moral superiority, and that a French victory in the war would have led to disastrous consequences for German-Canadians. (Note: A 2 February 1871 editorial read in part: "If the arrogant French people had been successful, the Germans would have been treated like Indians or Negros." An 1888 piece mentioned in passing that Romance languages had neither "the freshness, power, nor universality of the German," nor its "greater richness, flexibility and originality.") Lorenzkowski writes that these claims were generally exceptions. Over time, the Journal moved towards spurning German nationalism more than other local German papers. As anti-liberal trends expanded in Germany in the end of the 19th century, Motz critiqued the German government's actions, especially the lack of both parliamentary rights and freedom of speech.

Rittinger, a member of the Lutheran Church, and Motz, a devout Roman Catholic, were tolerant of each other's religions. In an 1859 editorial, Motz called for religious tolerance and freedom, writing he intended to keep the Journal out of religious matters. He further explained he intended the newspaper to be neutral in discussion of politics, though slightly leaning towards the Reform Party. In other pieces, he encouraged the paper's readers to be politically active and provided instructions on how to become a British subject so that they may vote. Despite his promise to be generally neutral in political discussions, the paper reliably supported the policies of the Reform Party's successor, the Liberal Party. Conservatives in Berlin opposed the Journal for its liberal slant and formed competing papers, such as the Freie Presse (Free Press) and the Deutsche Zeitung (German Newspaper) in 1891. Zeitung's editorials complained of "English nativism in Canada" and sought to promote German ways, while the Journal instead focused on more pressing German-Canadian issues. Historian Kenneth McLaughlin suggests Zeitung, which folded in 1899, was too narrowly German to maintain itself in Ontario. From 1875 to 1893, the Journal's circulation increased from 1,620 to around 2,200, expanding to eight pages on 21½ × 15½ inch paper.

== Expansion: 1899–1915 ==
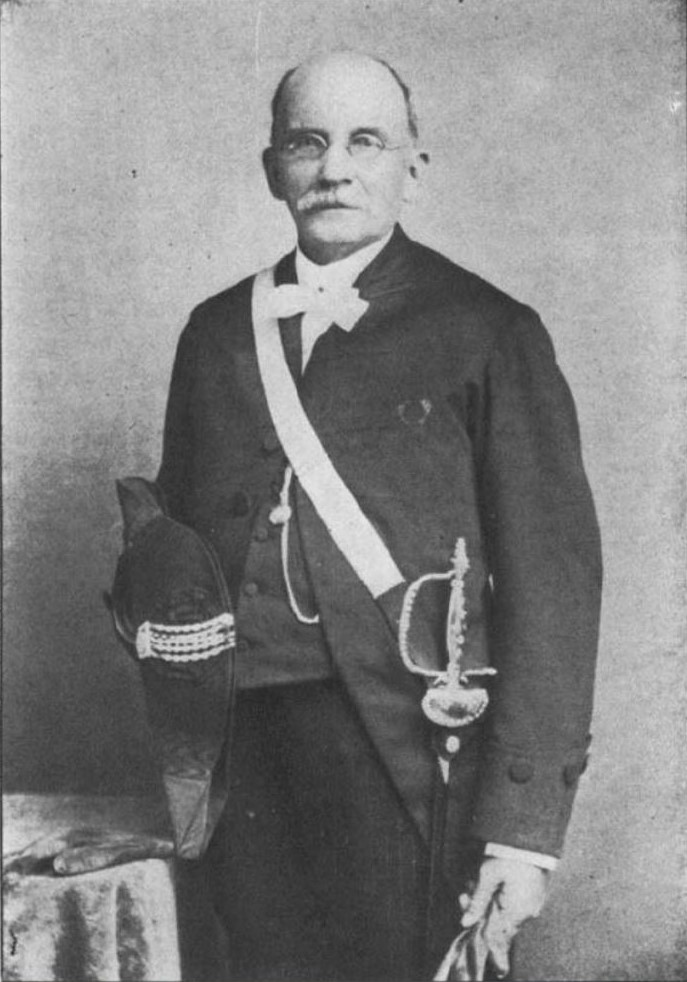
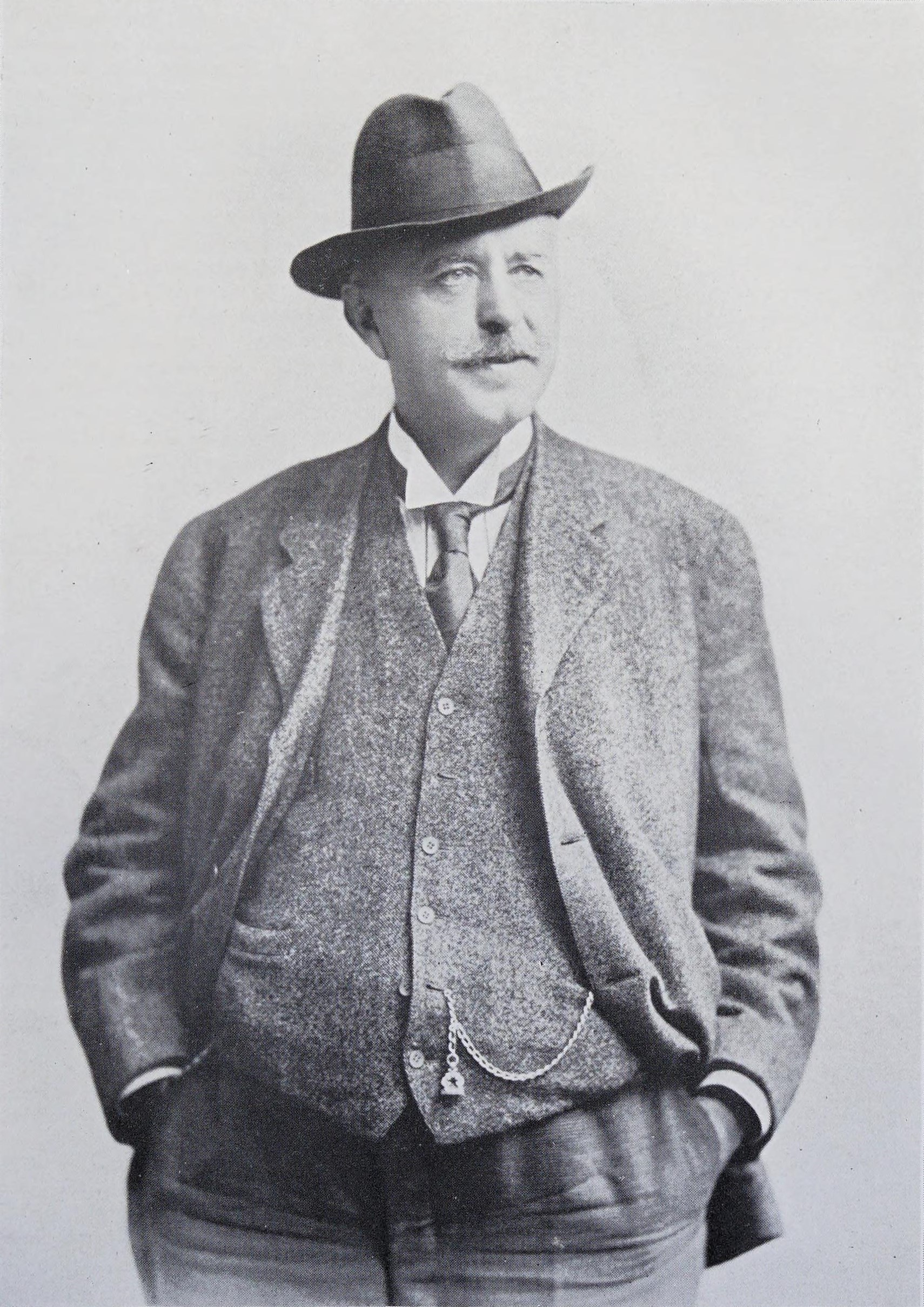
Left: Cofounder and editor John Motz, c. 1899–1911, left the paper in 1899 to become Waterloo County's honorary sheriff. Right: John Adam Rittinger, undated, became editor-in-chief in 1904.

=== Transfer to sons ===
Rittinger died in 1897, and, in 1899, Motz left the Berliner Journal to become the honorary sheriff of Waterloo County. Their sons took over the newspaper that year; William John Motz served as local editor and Herman Rittinger as the technical publisher-director. In 1904, another of Friedrich Rittinger's sons, John Adam Rittinger, became the newspaper's editor-in-chief after the Journal acquired the paper he owned and operated, Die Ontario Glocke of nearby Walkerton, Ontario.

John Adam Rittinger was born 16 February 1855 in Berlin, Canada West. After graduating from St. Jerome's College in 1873, Rittinger learned the printing trade at his father's shop and apprenticed for newspapers in Guelph, Toronto, Buffalo, New York and Chicago. In December 1875, he and the Pennsylvania German Aaron Eby acquired the Walkerton Glocke in Walkerton, Ontario. Their partnership dissolved in 1878 over political disagreements, with Rittinger becoming the sole owner and editor, renaming it Die Ontario Glocke in 1882. (Note: Leibbrandt writes the name change occurred in 1878.) Readers knew him affectionally as the "Glockemann", or the "Bell Ringer". On 1 July 1904, the Berliner Journal acquired the Glocke and made Rittinger its new editor-in-chief. (Note: Lehmann writes the Journal acquired the Glocke in 1878 but that the Glocke continued to appear independently in Walkerton until the early 20th century.)

William John Motz also attended St. Jerome's College, graduating in 1889. He studied classics and philosophy under St. Jerome's founder, Friar Louis Funcken, whom Kalbfleisch describes as "a priest of great erudition and exceptional pedagogical ability." (Note: When Funcken died in 1890, John Adam Rittinger provided a eulogy. Rittinger, the first Protestant to be President of St. Jerome's College's Alumni Union, described Funcken as having been "tolerant toward his fellow Christians of other denominations". He further added: " ... many able and useful citizens made their first higher studies under him. The good influence he exerted on his pupils, even in later years, was astonishing. They were still to him his 'dear boys' of former years, were they priests, lawyers or even editors.") Motz subsequently obtained a BA in political science at the University of Toronto and an MA at St. Francis Xavier College in New York. After returning to St. Jerome's and teaching for three years, he left for the Journal editorship in January 1899. In the years that followed, he occasionally returned to St. Jerome's to provide guest lectures on journalism.

Both Motz and Rittinger's views as espoused in the Journal were heavily influenced by their education under Funcken, promoting the use of the German language, civic duty and continuing to criticize the anti-liberal trends in Germany and Prussia. In a 1911 letter, Julius Funcken, brother of Louis and, though he lived in Holland, an avid reader of the Journal, wrote, "we believe we are not mistaken when we see Louis' views in the trends of the paper." The sons focused the Journal more heavily on local and national Canadian coverage than on Germany. Their approach to political coverage was also more neutral than John Motz's had been before them, only using the editorial columns to make political arguments. Letters to the editor written in the Pennsylvania-German dialect rather than traditional High German became more common.

=== Mergers and expansion ===
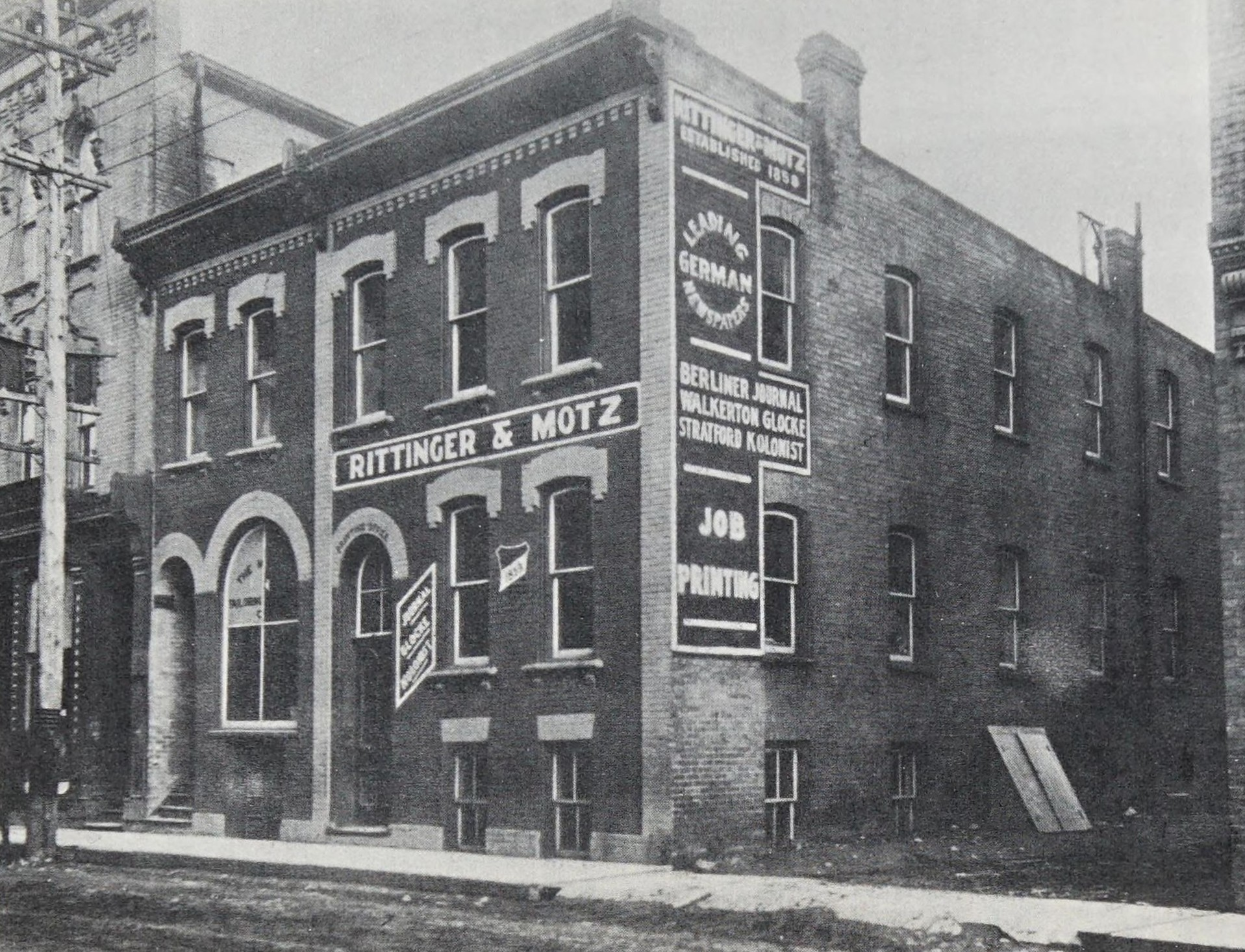
By 1906, increasing circulation necessitated Rittinger & Motz, the newspaper's printing firm, move to larger facilities at 15 Queen St. S. (pictured c. 1906–1908).

The Journal absorbed several other German newspapers, including Walkerton's Ontario Glocke in July 1904, Stratford's Canadische Kolonist in July 1906, and both New Hamburg's Canadische Volksblatt and Waterloo's Canadischer Bauernfreund in July 1909. (Note: The Canadische Volksblatt amalgamated into the Canadischer Bauernfreund on 2 December 1908.) Though the content was identical, the amalgamated papers continued to be issued under their original names so as to not upset longtime subscribers. The Journal's expansion required the newspaper's printer, the Rittinger & Motz printing firm, relocate to larger facilities. With the help of a $5,000 loan (equivalent to CA$167,000 in 2025) from local manufacturer and politician Louis Jacob Breithaupt, it moved to 15 Queen Street South in 1906.

After the Glocke merger in 1904, the Berliner Journal increased to twelve pages, and then to sixteen pages in 1909. By this time, it was one of only two German papers in Ontario; the other, Pembroke's Deutsche Post, attracted little attention outside of Eastern Ontario and folded in 1916. The Journal rose from a circulation of 3,900 in 1906 to a peak of 5,155 in 1908, with the average circulation for the year ending 31 December 1909 being 5,154. These numbers made it the most widely read German-language newspaper in Canada, with subscribers in Toronto, Ottawa, Halifax, Montreal and British Columbia. Readership also extended into the northern United States, including Pennsylvania, Ohio and Michigan.

=== Letters of Joe Klotzkopp, Esq. ===
After moving from the Glocke to the Journal, Rittinger continued to publish his widely popular letters to the editor, signed under the pseudonym "Joe Klotzkopp". The name translates from Pennsylvania German to English as either "Joe the Blockhead" or "John the Blockhead". Rittinger published his first humorous letter in the 22 January 1890 edition of the Glocke. (Note: Kalbfleisch writes the first letter "seems to have appeared in the Glocke on January 22, 1890." Both Tötösy de Zepetnek and scholar Georg K. Weissenborn write the letters began in 1890, while Hayes says they began in 1895.) After publishing them occasionally through November, subscribers demanded more, prompting their resumption the following year, with Rittinger continuing to write and publish them for the next twenty-five years.

When I reflect on it I am in fact amazed that not more of our younger fellows join the ranks to fight in Europe. Is there anything more beautiful in this world than to have yourself shot to death for the kings and emperors, or afterwards, when the war is over, to hobble around without an arm or leg, but with a silver medal on your chest?

— Joe Klotzkopp, Berliner Journal, April 1915; translated by Herbert Karl Kalbfleisch

The letters uniquely and humorously combine the Pennsylvania German dialect with phonetic reproductions of English words. The dialect was common among the Germans of nineteenth-century Ontario, and German-language newspapers across Upper and Lower Canada and Nova Scotia regularly published letters using it. Rittinger originally learned High German, and acquired the dialect later in life. His character Joe Klotzkopp is "a poor, but easy-going farmer", living with his wife Särah Klotzkopp near Neustadt, Ontario in Bruce County. The letters describe contemporary Upper Canadian life, injecting humour into the rural life of German-Canadians, while using levity to impart serious moral lessons.

Scholar Gottlieb Leibbrandt writes that the letters are of particular interest to scholars as "superb examples of German-Canadian comic literature in dialect." Researcher Steven Tötösy de Zepetnek suggests that because the letters are restricted thematically to contemporaneous issues, their value to modern scholars resides in studying their style and use of language, along with "their humoristic and ironic mode of narration." Scholar Hermann Boeschenstein writes that the letters mediate between European and Canadian cultures, and that "Rittinger proved ... that immigration can be conducive to the exchange and dissemination of valuable experience and ideas". Leibbrandt, Tötösy de Zepetnek and Kalbfleisch agree that Rittinger's writings rank him among the greatest of Canadian humorists. Kalbfleisch remarks that Rittinger's "wit and humour were ever present adjunct to his racy and picturesque style", especially within the Joe Klotzkopp letters. He compares Rittinger's work to that of Thomas Chandler Haliburton and Stephen Leacock, and ultimately concludes that "[h]ad he written in the English language his reputation in Canada would now be secure. By comparison, scholar E. W. Herd characterizes the letters as "naïve and popular". He opines that their humour is more easily appreciated by a Pennsylvania German reader, while "for other readers the parody is not so obvious, and the humour loses its spice".

== Decline: 1915–1918 ==
=== First World War and anti-German sentiments ===
Great Britain declared war on Germany on 4 August 1914. As a Dominion of the British Empire, Canada automatically entered the war following Britain's declaration. On 12 August, the Berliner Journal warned, "The die is cast, the two greatest European empires face each other with weapons raised." Published in the same issue, an "Address to all Germans in Ontario" implored German-Canadians to recognize their loyalty to Canada:

The love for our old fatherland is innate, and the admiration of our new homeland should not bring us into inner conflict ... Canada ... has invited us to make a home here. We mustn't forget the years of peace and prosperity we have experienced under the British flag. ... The "Union Jack" has fluttered above us, our children were born under it. Germany's victory or defeat will not change anything in our relations to our adopted fatherland, to our new home. ... Don't allow yourselves to be driven to demonstrations of any kind, avoid arguments with citizens of other nations. Be silent, bear this difficult time with dignity and show that you are true Germans, grateful to the country that accommodated you and in which you found a new home.

Since the beginning of this regrettable war we have made it our solemn duty to publish only officially confirmed dispatches in our war news, and in spite of this we could not please some of our readers. For the one we are too pro-German, for the other too pro-British.

— Berliner Journal editorial, 20 January 1915; translated by Werner A. Bausenhart

The war led to condemnation of the German tradition in Canada and rising anti-German sentiments, especially following the May 1915 sinking of the RMS Lusitania. To maintain its position in the community, the Journal generally avoided exaggerating anti-German incidents. The paper's editors found it difficult to please all readers; they resolved to only publish official war news but alternately received complaints that the paper was either too British or too German in its coverage. Circulation declined, with angry readers cancelling their subscriptions in protest. (Note: A letter to the editor in the 20 January 1915 issue read: We dont want Kiser Williams paper in canada we want King George papers we dont want Kiser too rool in Ontario we have inglish paper too find out whats going on. You better get out too Germany there you can print what you like. [sic]) To those immigrants that remained loyal to Germany, the editors explained in a September 1914 article that being born and raised in Canada – being several generations removed from Germany – led them to being more British in their outlook. They further explained it would be ungrateful of them to "[denigrate] the land in which we enjoy complete freedom as well as protection of life and property." The Journal encourage German-Canadians to comply with all Canadian laws, while also stating in a 13 January 1915 editorial that each immigrant had a right to "entertain in his heart sympathy for the old homeland."

In July 1915, the London Advertiser of nearby London, Ontario accused the Journal of spreading sedition after it published a piece by William John Motz summarizing the first year of the war. The following month, the Advertiser's editor, A. C. Laut, attempted to get the Journal censored by writing to Canada's chief press censor, Ernest J. Chambers. Laut accused the Journal of suggesting that the war began due to a commercial rivalry between Britain and Germany. Chambers appealed to Secretary of State Louis Coderre for a warrant to suppress the newspaper, but was unsuccessful after Waterloo North Member of Parliament William George Weichel defended both the paper and Motz's character. In an August 1915 letter, Chambers admitted to Motz that, "it appears ... that your attitude has been somewhat misrepresented". Despite the admission, Chambers still refused to admonish Laut, explaining to Motz that publishing a German-language newspaper while being of "German extraction ... imposes upon you certain standards of carefulness which might not be expected of others."

=== Restructuring and name change ===
Herman Rittinger died on 22 September 1913 and John A. Rittinger on 29 July 1915. In September 1915, C. C. Johannes Maass took over as editor. Maass was born in 1862 in Bergen on Ruegen. He studied at Franckesche Stiftungen in Halle, Germany, and studied theology at Berlin's Kropp Seminary, working as a Lutheran pastor in several Ontario towns, including New Hamburg, Preston and Berlin. In 1899, he published a book, Gedichte (Poems), publishing more of his poetry in the Journal during his editorship.

Further restructuring in the Rittinger & Motz printing firm's leadership led to former Berlin mayor W. H. Schmalz becoming vice-president and William John Motz president, with the two providing technical direction. Shortly after John Adam Rittinger's death, politician William Daum Euler took a stake in the newspaper by buying all of Rittinger's shares in the printing firm. The Rittinger & Motz byline that had appeared below the newspaper's masthead since its founding was removed in March 1916 and the paper's length was reduced to eight pages in May.

A name established, like that of Berlin for 90 years, has become part of civic consciousness. To change it is to produce a feeling of unnaturalness among those citizens especially who, with their fathers before them, have dwelt in the place for generations. To such persons the place under the new name will never seem quite the same. They have been robbed of part of their being. This, and not because there is a Berlin in Germany, was the real reason for the opposition to a change in Berlin's name.

— Berliner Journal editorial explaining their opposition to the Berlin-to-Kitchener name change, 26 July 1916; translated by Gerhard P. Bassler

Tensions in the community over the city's German heritage and German naming led to a 1916 referendum regarding the city name, a change the editors of the Journal strongly opposed. After the referendum passed successfully and the city name officially changed from Berlin to Kitchener, editorial content largely disappeared from the newspaper. Articles covering anodyne topics became more common; titles of articles in the summer of 1917 included: "On Getting Up Early", "Nervous Parents", and "About Cold Baths".

Though the city was no longer named Berlin, the leaders of the Journal initially refused to change the newspaper's name, instead only adding beneath the masthead: "verlegt und gedruckt in Canada" (published and printed in Canada). In November 1916, the Rittinger & Motz firm sent a letter to their customers explaining that they could not change the name "until the ratepayers of this city definitely decide the name issue in a fair election without intimidation or danger of violence". (Note: Historian Adam Crerar writes that the referendum was characterized by intimidation; soldiers of the local 118th Battalion kept potential name change opponents away from the polls, while name change proponents challenged unnaturalized citizens.) The refusal outraged the Kitchener City Council aldermen J. A. Hallman, C. C. Hahn and W. G. Cleghorn, with Hahn suggesting legal action against the firm. Schmalz – who had been a vocal opponent of the name change – found himself targeted by locals. Manufacturer D. B. Detweiler swore in an affidavit that the company Schmalz managed, the Economical Fire Insurance Company, posted a notice in the early days of the war calling upon German reservists to serve for Germany. The prosecution stalled, but caused embarrassment for Schmalz. His son, a Royal Military College graduate, likely lost his opportunity at a military career due to their relation. The Journal eventually relented, changing its name to the Ontario Journal on 10 January 1917.

=== German publication ban ===
On 25 September 1918, the Canadian Government passed an Order in Council prohibiting "the publication of books, newspapers, magazines or any printed matter in the language of any country or people for the time being at war with Great Britain." The order had the effect of suppressing newspapers not published in English or French, such as the Berliner Journal. As the Journal was a weekly publication, its next issue was scheduled for 2 October.

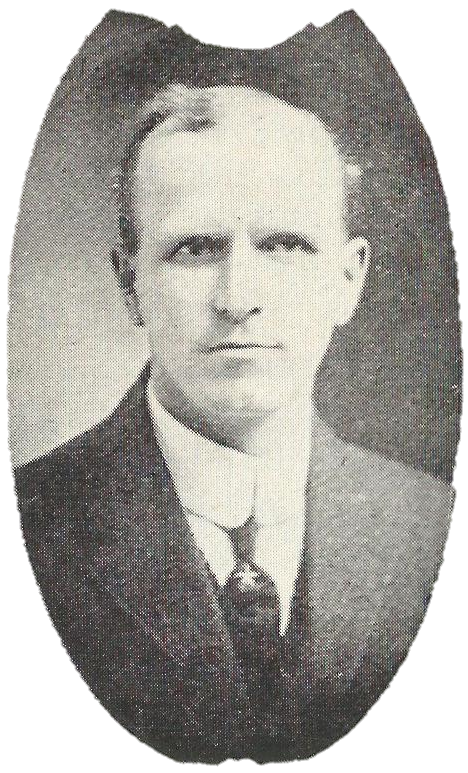
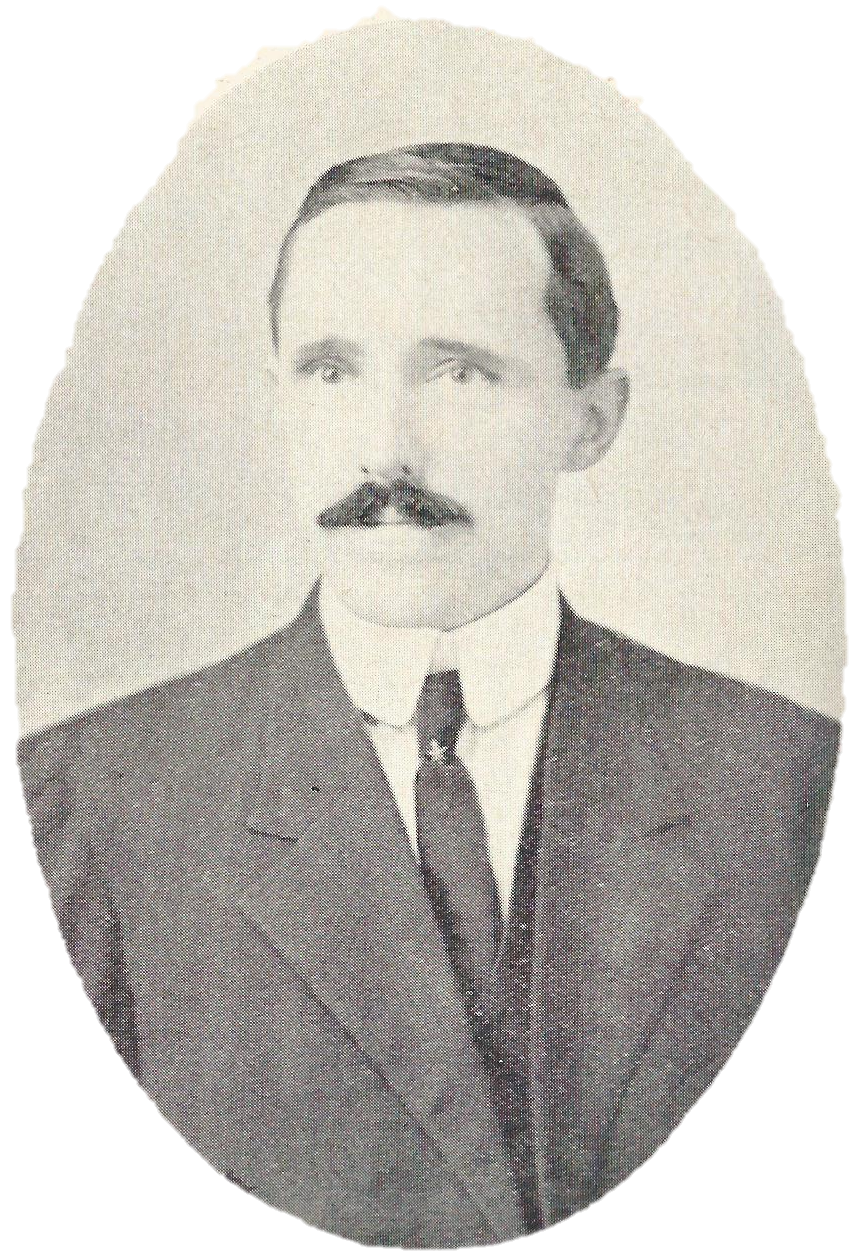
W. D. Euler (left) and William John Motz retained influence in Kitchener by buying several local English-language newspapers and merging them into The Daily Record.

A piece in the 4 December 1918 issue of the Journal questioned the lateness of the Order, asking: "The war ended six weeks after the Union Government prohibited German papers in Canada. Why didn't they take action in 1914?" Historian Werner A. Bausenhart suggests the Order was likely connected to Newton Rowell's attempt to consolidate news information through his creation of The Canadian Official Record in September 1918. Bausenhart writes that, with The Canadian Official Record's first issue published on 1 October, only a week after the Order, "[i]t would seem probable, then, that in connection with Mr. Rowell's reorganization of the Department of Public Information, this Order-in-Council was intended to bring some order to the diverse field of Canadian periodical publications." The editors of the Journal did not anticipate the ban and hoped to acquire special permission to continue publishing. The order permitted publication in German only if every article had an accompanying English or French translation, an option the editors rejected as impractical. The Journal ran its last German issue on 2 October, its circulation around 3,200. Its first English-only issue ran on 9 October 1918 and the paper ceased publication entirely in December.

The government repealed the ban in January 1920 but – besides the short-lived Kitchener Journal from 1967 to 1969 – the German-language press did not return to the city. Kalbfleisch reflects: "[I]ts prohibition, in retrospect, seems to have been hasty and ill-advised. A language in itself does not create disloyalty, even if it is at the moment the language of the enemy." Scholar Gerhard Friesen argues that the First World War eradicated German culture in Canada and assigns blame to the editors of the Journal for not having led a defence of the German community.

Despite the closure of the Journal, William John Motz retained influence in the community by purchasing other local newspapers with Euler. They bought the two largest newspapers in the area, the Waterloo News Record in October 1919 and the Daily Telegraph in July 1922, merging them to form The Daily Record. Motz served as the newspaper's managing director. The newspaper has continued to publish into the 21st century, most recently having changed its name in 2008 to the Waterloo Region Record.

== See also ==
- List of German-language newspapers of Ontario
- List of early Canadian newspapers
- List of defunct newspapers of Canada
