= Der Deutsche Canadier =

Newspaper in 19th-century Berlin, Canada West

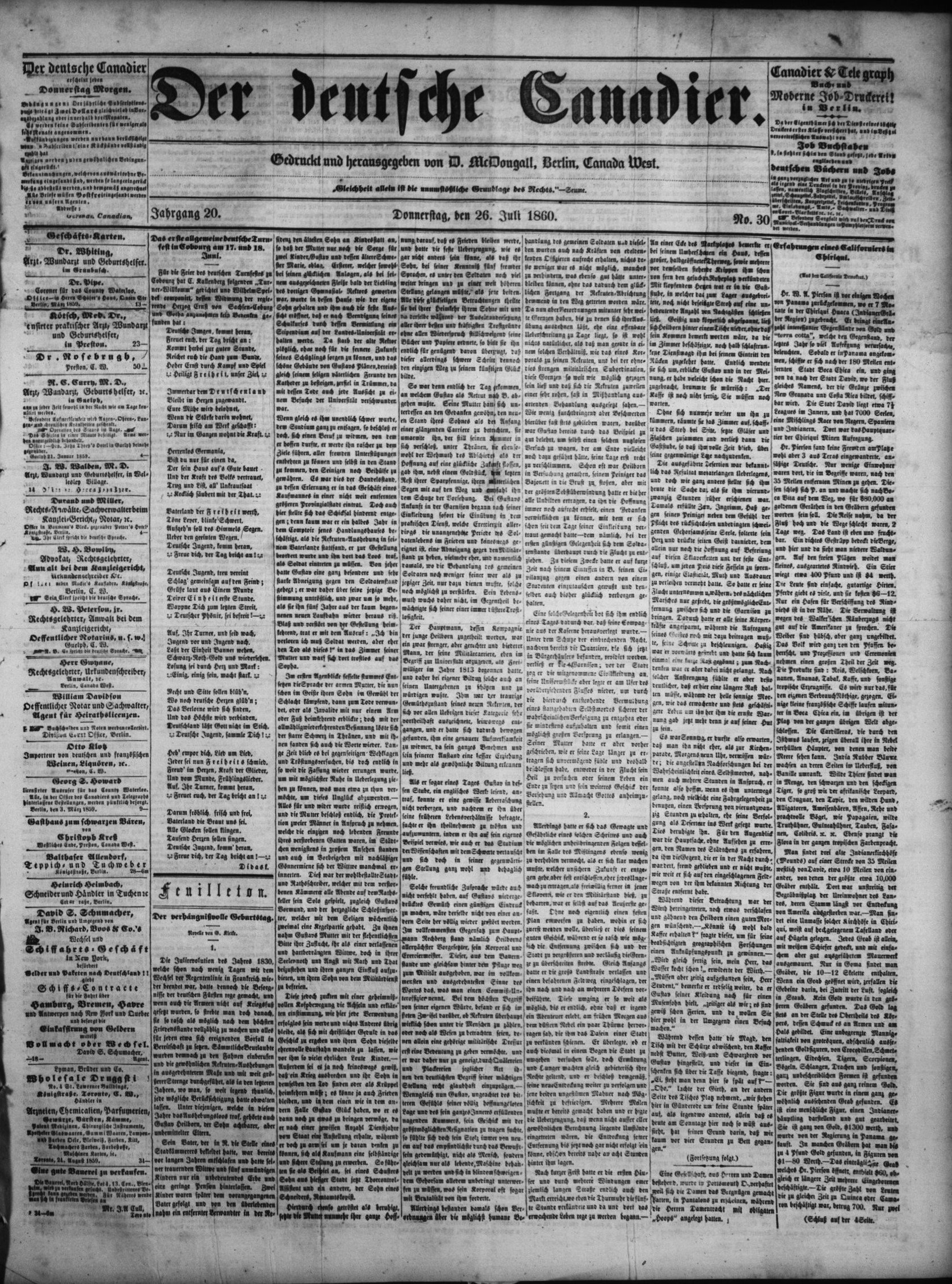
- Front page of Der Deutsche Canadier, 26 July 1860
- Type: Weekly newspaper
- Founded: 1841
- Ceased publication: 1865
- Political alignment: Reform
- Language: German
- Headquarters: Berlin, Canada West (now Kitchener, Ontario)
- ISSN: 0839-167X
- OCLC number: 1119075046

Der Deutsche Canadier (English: The German Canadian; originally Der Deutsche Canadier und Neuigkeitsbote, English: The German Canadian and News Messenger) was a German-language weekly newspaper published in Berlin, Canada West (now Kitchener, Ontario), from 1841 to 1865. The Canadier was founded in January 1841 by Heinrich "Henry" Eby, son of Berlin's founder Benjamin Eby. It was among Upper Canada's first German-language newspapers and was the only one published in British North America from September 1841 through January 1848, during which time it was widely read across Canada.

In the 1840s, Canada West experienced an influx of German (Note: Before the unification of Germany in 1871, the use of "German" did not refer to a single nation state. Those who immigrated to Canada before the unification understood that their family had left an area of what became the German nation state or from an area that shared its culture and language.) immigrants who left Europe due to social and political upheaval. The Canadier directed its coverage towards the interests of these new immigrants, focusing on European politics and social happenings, especially those of Germany. Regarding Canadian politics, the newspaper was a reliable supporter of the Reform Party. As most new immigrants were artisans rather than farmers, readers demanded German prose and poetry, and the newspaper supplemented its political coverage with literary content.

Across its twenty-four year history, the newspaper went through numerous owners and editors. The instability which characterized its management left it unable to easily cope with competition. In 1859, the head of the Canadier's mechanical department, Friedrich Rittinger, abruptly left the newspaper to found the competing Berliner Journal. The Canadier folded in January 1865, with attempted revivals in the late 1860s failing quickly.

== Background ==
At the beginning of the nineteenth century, Waterloo Township in Upper Canada was primarily made up of Mennonites from Pennsylvania. With an influx of European immigrants to Upper Canada beginning in the 1820s, the presence of this German-speaking population attracted German settlers. As the third-largest immigrant group to Canada in the nineteenth century after the English and French, German publications were in high demand. The publications faced numerous obstacles to their success, including a short supply of German printers and typesetters. As well, most news items needed to be translated into German from English, a labour-intensive process, especially when dealing with more technical subjects.

=== Canada Museum und Allgemeine Zeitung ===
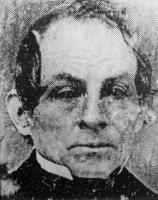
Heinrich "Henry" Peterson, proprietor of the Museum, who sold his printing press to Heinrich Eby in 1841.

In 1835, Heinrich Wilhelm Peterson (Note: Peterson later anglicized his named as Henry William Peterson.) established Canada Museum und Allgemeine Zeitung in the hamlet of Berlin, Waterloo Township. As Upper Canada's first German-language weekly newspaper, the publication predated Berlin's first English newspaper by 18 years. Peterson was born in Quakenbrück, Duchy of Oldenburg, on 27 May 1793, and his parents migrated to Baltimore, Maryland, when he was two years old. Arriving in Harrisburg, Pennsylvania, in March 1803, he operated several German publications in Pennsylvania in the 1810s and 1820s before moving to Berlin in 1832. Wanting to start another newspaper, but finding himself with little available capital, he relied on help from around 140 friends, 51 of whom became shareholders in the newspaper. After a printing press was transported from Pennsylvania to Berlin via oxen, he printed, published and edited the first issue of Museum, appearing on 27 August 1835. His first apprentice, Heinrich Eby, the son of bishop and Berlin-founder Benjamin Eby, assisted in the production, printing a poem by the German poet Christian Friedrich Daniel Schubart.

The presence of the Museum in Berlin helped to emphasize the town's status as the centre of Upper Canada's German population. The newspaper ran pieces advocating for Berlin to be the township's "district town", while subscribers hoped it would help to preserve their language and traditional values. Peterson became increasingly active in the community, leaving him with less time to sustain the publication of the Museum. He sold the German part of his printing business to Heinrich Eby, who had by that time been apprenticing under Peterson as a printer for four years. The final issue of the Museum ran on 18 December 1840, with Peterson recommending Eby and Enslin's new German language newspaper, Der Deutsche Canadier, to all Museum subscribers.

== History ==
Heinrich Eby founded Der Deutsche Canadier und Neuigkeitsbote (The German Canadian and News Messenger) in January 1841, serving as its first publisher and owner. (Note: The newspaper changed names to Der Deutsche Canadier (The German Canadian) at an unspecified date.) Basing the newspaper in Berlin, Eby built a printing office near the corner of King and South Eby Streets. Upon its founding, the only other local German newspaper, Der Morgenstern, issued a piece warmly welcoming the Canadier. In Der Morgenstern's final issue, dated 16 September 1841, its proprietor, Benjamin Burkholder, recommended readers subscribe to the Canadier. Christian Enslin was the Canadier's first editor, holding the position for nine years. A local bookbinder and seller of books, medicines and glasses, Enslin migrated from Württemberg to Berlin in 1833. He worked as the associate editor of the Museum from December 1837 through November 1838. The Canadier went through a series of editors, some only serving for a few months. (Note: The editors of the Canadier include: Christian Enslin (January 1841 to January 1850); Johann Jakob Ernst (January 1850 to June 1853); F. B. J. Schwarz (June to October 1853); Edward Lindemann (October 1853 to April 1856); Friedrich Keller (April to June 1856); H. Th. Legler (July 1856 to 23 June 1858); Dougall McDougall (23 June 1858 to 19 January 1865)) At the end of 1851, Eby sold the newspaper to his brother, Peter Eby, and in July 1856 Peter sold it to another brother, Elias Eby. Elias served a broader audience through publishing an English language newspaper as well, the Berlin Telegraph and Waterloo County Intelligencer, from 1853 to 1899. The Telegraph and Der Deutsche Canadier were both published in a building owned by Peter Eby.

Elias Eby sold the Canadier to Dougall McDougall in May 1857, who owned the newspaper until its final issue on 19 January 1865. With frequent changes in ownership and many different editors, the paper experienced consistent instability in its management, with disputes between publisher and editor common. The most significant shock to the Canadier came when the head of its mechanical department, Friedrich Rittinger, left in 1859 to found the competing Berliner Journal with John Motz. Entering into a prolonged feud with the Journal, the management of the Canadier found it too difficult to cope against the better run Journal.

Following the Canadier's dissolution, William Moyer in the neighbouring village of Waterloo attempted to revive the newspaper by founding the Deutscher Canadier und Allgemeiner Anzeiger in November 1867. The attempt lasted less than two years, dissolving in October 1869. Another local, Wilhelm Raich, founded a Deutscher Canadier in September 1869 in opposition to Moyer's newspaper, but Raich's publication folded in January 1870.

== Content ==
=== Format and style ===
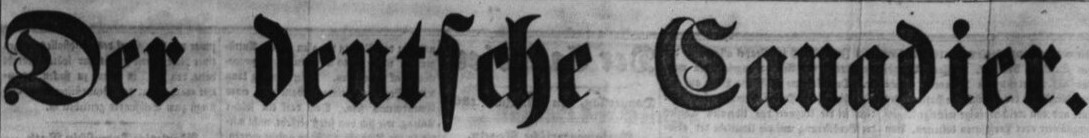
Different mastheads of Der Deutsche Canadier. The lower first appeared on 3 January 1861.

The format of the Canadier was nearly identical to that of its predecessor, the Museum. As a weekly newspaper, subscribers paid CA$2.00 per year or CA$3.00 if receiving it by mail (equivalent to CA$50 and CA$80 in 2023) until 1852, at which time the prices were reduced to $1.50 in advance or $2.00 if in arrears three months (equivalent to CA$40 and CA$50 in 2023). Always four pages long, the dimensions of the newsprint expanded over time. Beginning with 20 × 14 inch paper (50.8 × 35.6 cm) and four large columns per page, the dimensions expanded to 22 × 16 inches (55.9 × 40.6 cm) for 1843–1844 before reverting to its original size; in 1848, it again expanded to its larger size, adding a fifth column to each page; in 1852, it added a sixth column. In 1853, it again increased, this time to 25½ × 19½ inches (64.8 × 49.5 cm) and seven columns per page. A motto that occasionally changed appeared beneath the newspaper's masthead, including Gott und mein Recht (God and my right) in 1841, and Gleichheit allein ist die unumstößliche Grundlage des Rechts (Equality alone is the firm foundation of justice) in 1855.

In its written vocabulary, the newspaper occasionally used words from the local Pennsylvania German language, including "Flauer" (flour) and "Klertsche" (clergy), amongst others. Advertisements were mostly in German, but English ones appeared on occasion. Scholar Herbert Karl Kalbfleisch writes the newspaper was stylistically weak, which "offended the taste of some readers", though most did not complain.

=== Coverage ===
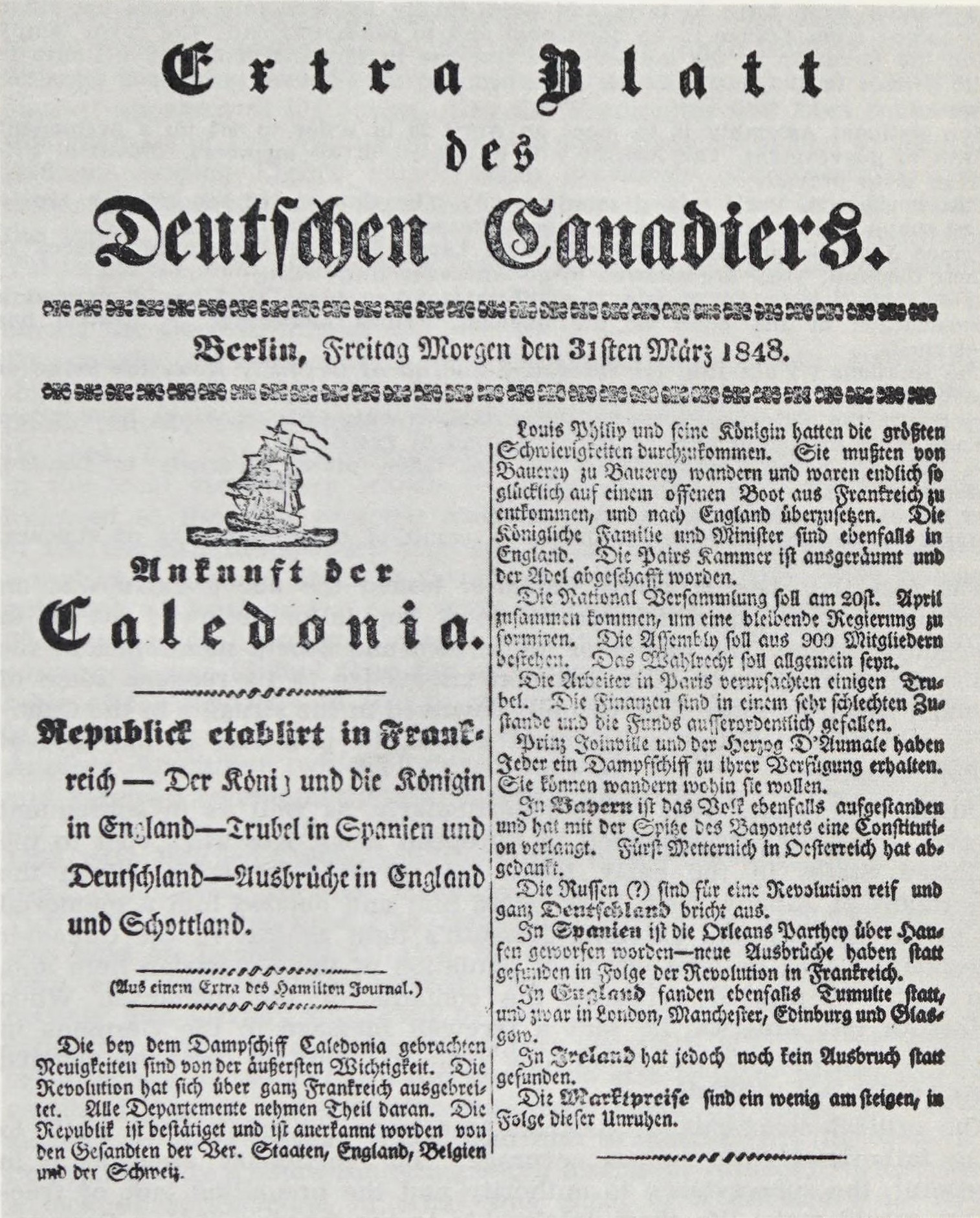
A March 1848 extra edition of Der Deutsche Canadier covering the revolutions in Europe. The newspaper catered its coverage to recent German immigrants who remained interested in European political and social happenings.

In the 1840s, Canada West experienced another influx of German immigrants caused by poor agricultural conditions in Europe, as well as turbulent political conditions resulting from the German revolutions of 1848–1849. The Canadier's flourishing period coincided with this population increase, with historians John English and Kenneth McLaughlin describing the Canadier as "the most successful and widely read German newspaper in [Canada]". From September 1841 through January 1848, Der Deutsche Canadier was the only German language newspaper in British North America. The only circulation figure available is from the 2 January 1852 issue of the newspaper, with Peter Eby writing that the subscription list numbered almost one thousand. Kalbfleisch writes there is no way to confirm the figure, adding that some newspapers artificially inflated their subscriber numbers to attract advertisers.

Though his father was a Mennonite, Heinrich Eby instead focused the paper towards the German culture of Berlin's new immigrants, cultivating a unique German-Canadian culture. Though the new immigrants detested the German political system they left behind, they remained interested in the political and social events of Germany, leading the newspaper to focus on European coverage. The Canadier published an extra edition in March 1848 covering the revolutions in Europe, which Kalbfleisch suggests indicates how interested the readership remained in European news.

Despite its focus on Europe, the Canadier covered Canadian political content, especially regarding its political and public institutions. Kalbfleisch suggests the coverage of Canadian politics was framed in a way to encourage recent German immigrants to abandon "their lethargy toward public affairs which had characterized the behavior of many of them in the fatherland". While the Museum attempted to be politically impartial, it strongly denounced the rebellions of 1837–1838. The Canadier, however, was consistently partisan through all of its owners and editors, vehemently arguing for the Reform Party and describing the Tories as dishonest and corrupt. The paper encouraged those Germans who could vote to support the Reform Party in all election contests. Through the 1850s, McDougall's political connections helped him win the majority of Waterloo County's municipal printing contracts. When the Liberal Party gifted him a gold watch in 1861 to recognize his services, the Berliner Journal criticized the gift as open bribery. In December 1863, McDougall was proposed to be the county registrar of deeds, with the Journal strongly opposing the nomination and suggesting the "honest man" A. J. Peterson in his place. Despite the opposition, McDougall won the position in 1864.

As recent German immigrants were mostly made up of artisans rather than farmers, the readers of the Canadier demanded poetry and prose content, pushing the paper to maintain "a high literary tone". After Edward Lindemann became editor in October 1853, the amount of literary content greatly expanded, including several of Lindemann's short stories. Kalbfleisch writes that Lindemann "raised the quality of the Canadier appreciably and improved its literary tone". After publishing a serial story from January through February 1854 – "Die Tochter der Riccarees, Lebensbilder aus Louisiana" by Friedrich Gerstäcker – the newspaper published at least one prose story instalment with each issue until it folded in January 1865.

== See also ==
- List of German language newspapers of Ontario
- List of early Canadian newspapers
- List of defunct newspapers of Canada
