= List of German-language newspapers of Ontario =

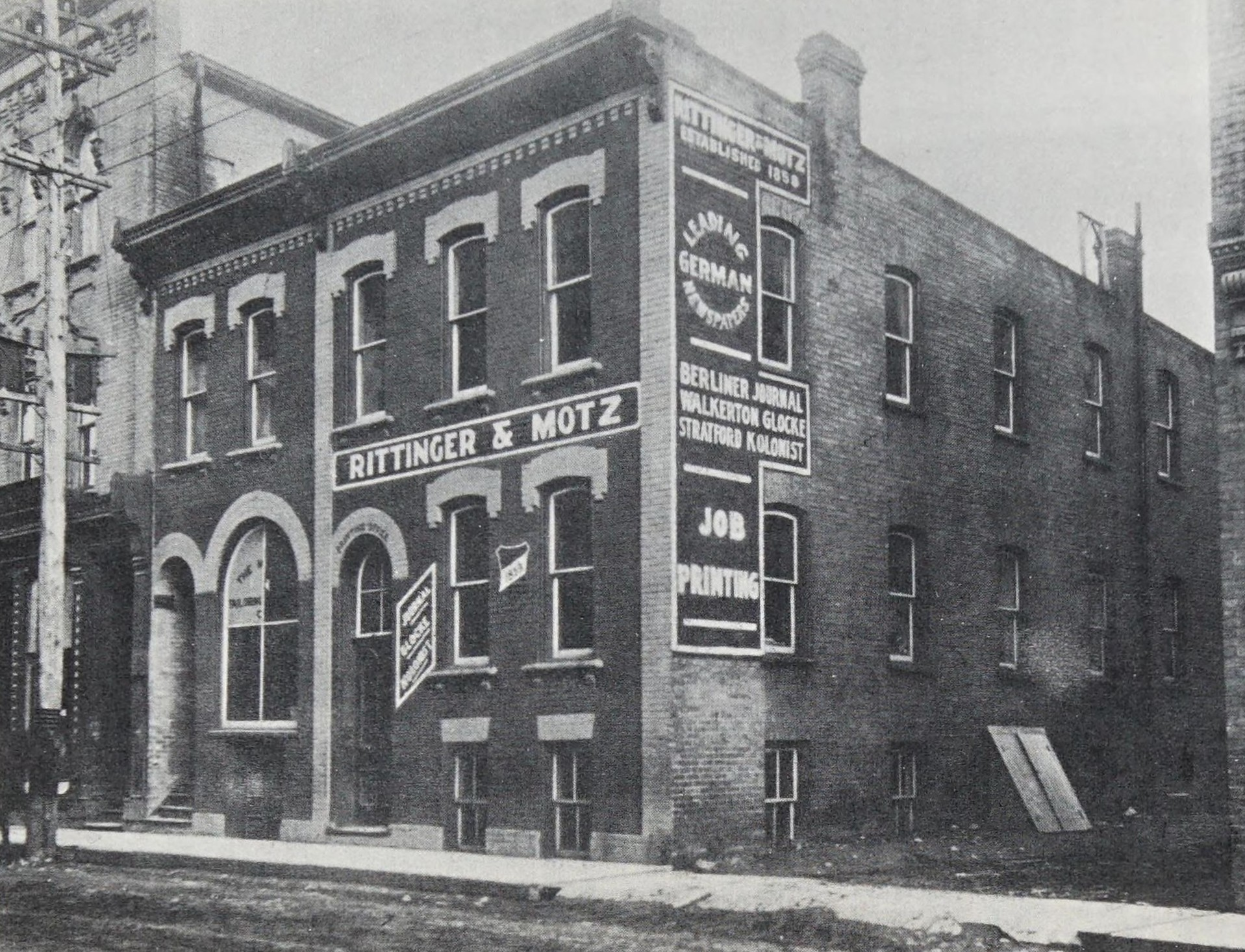
The Rittinger & Motz printing firm of Berlin, Ontario (pictured c. 1906–1908) printed several German-language newspapers, including the Berliner Journal, Die Ontario Glocke and Der Canadische Kolonist.

In nineteenth-century Upper Canada, (Note: The area was known as Upper Canada after 1791, Canada West from 1841 to 1867, and Ontario after Canadian Confederation in 1867.) German-language publications were in high demand. After the English and French, Germans were the third-largest immigrant group in Canada. (Note: Before the unification of Germany in 1871, German did not refer to the people of a single nation state. The immigrants' area of origin was often designated as "Germany" and was technically within the Holy Roman Empire, but the historian Kenneth McLaughlin writes it is "more properly defined as 'Mitteleuropa'." Those who immigrated to Canada before the unification understood that their family had left an area of what became the German nation state or from an area that shared its culture and language.) Most Germans settled in Waterloo County, especially in the towns of Berlin (now Kitchener) and Waterloo, and most newspapers were established there to service the population. (Note: Toronto was Canada West's population centre, but it was unable to support a large German readership; its only German-language newspaper moved away after less than a year of publication.) In any year between 1859 and 1908, Waterloo County typically had four German newspapers, and always between three and five. In the period from 1835 to 1914, nine German newspapers were founded in Berlin and Waterloo and six in Preston, New Hamburg and Elmira. German is the only language other than English or French to have had a flourishing newspaper press in Ontario; approximately thirty German newspapers were published in the province between 1835 and 1918.

Ontario's first German-language newspaper, Canada Museum und Allgemeine Zeitung, was founded in Berlin in 1835, predating the town's first English-language newspaper by 18 years. German-language publications were not typically read outside of Ontario's German communities, leading them to focus their reporting on local news and interpretations foreign events. Due to their small readership, they exerted little political influence on anything other than a local level. Most publication were dependent upon a small population group and folded after only a few years, but the towns Berlin, Waterloo and New Hamburg each supported at least one German newspaper until 1909, by which time all competitors had either folded or amalgamated into Berlin's Berliner Journal.

On 25 September 1918, in the last weeks of the First World War, the Canadian government passed an Order in Council prohibiting "the publication of books, newspapers, magazines or any printed matter in the language of any country or people for the time being at war with Great Britain." The Order had the effect of banning German-language publications, leading to the 1918 closure of the last remaining German newspaper, the Berliner Journal (since renamed the Ontario Journal). Although the government repealed the order in January 1920, it was not until 1967 that another German-language newspaper appeared – the Kitchener Journal, which ceased publication in 1969.

In the wake of the Second World War, a surge in immigration of ethnic Germans from Eastern Europe and Germany led to a small revival of Ontario's German-language newspapers. Toronto's das journal, published from 2011 to 2023, was Ontario's last German-language newspaper.

== Newspapers ==
Key
—	Indicates unavailable information

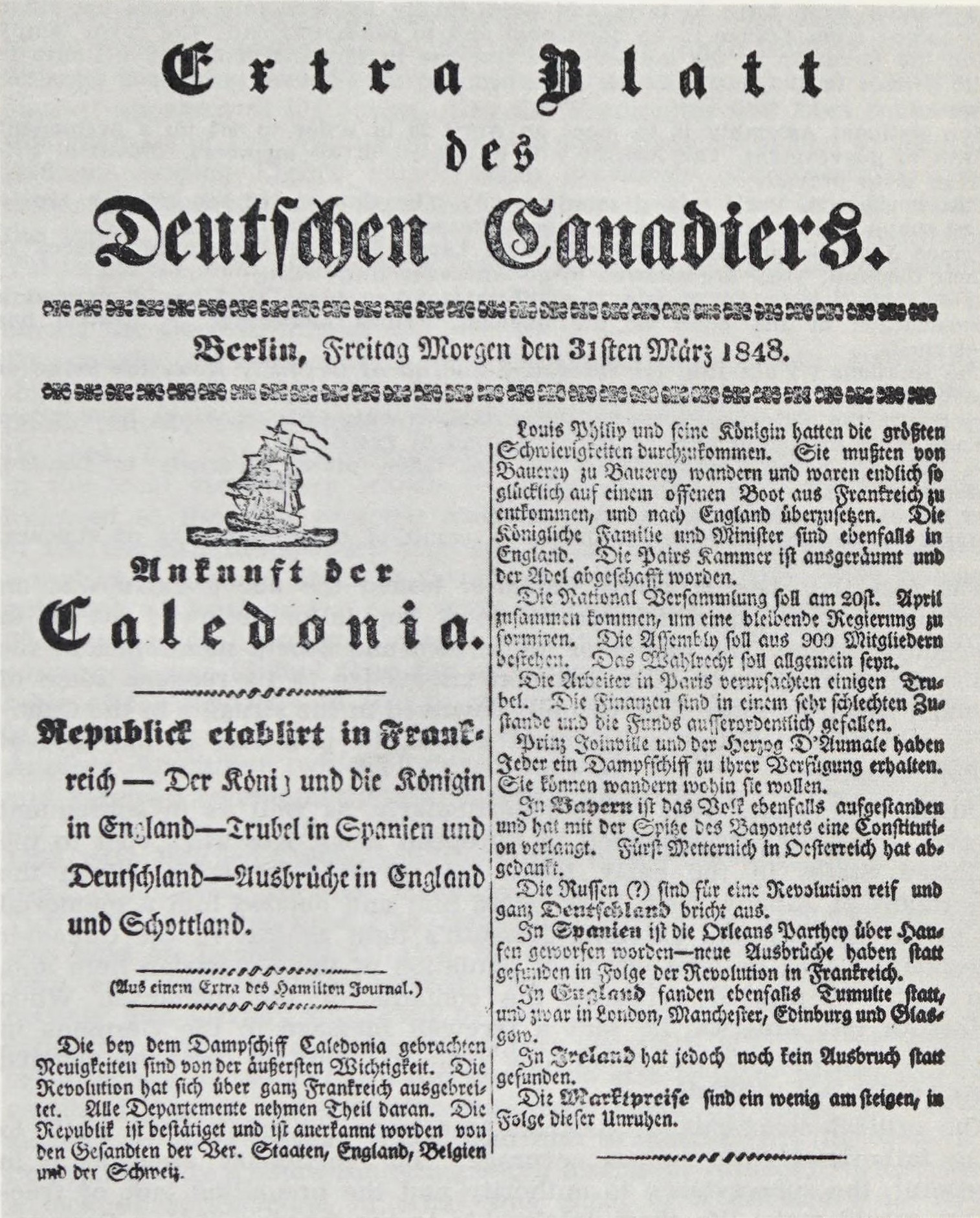
A March 1848 extra edition of Der Deutsche Canadier covering the revolutions in Europe. The newspaper catered its coverage to recent German immigrants who remained interested in European political and social happenings.

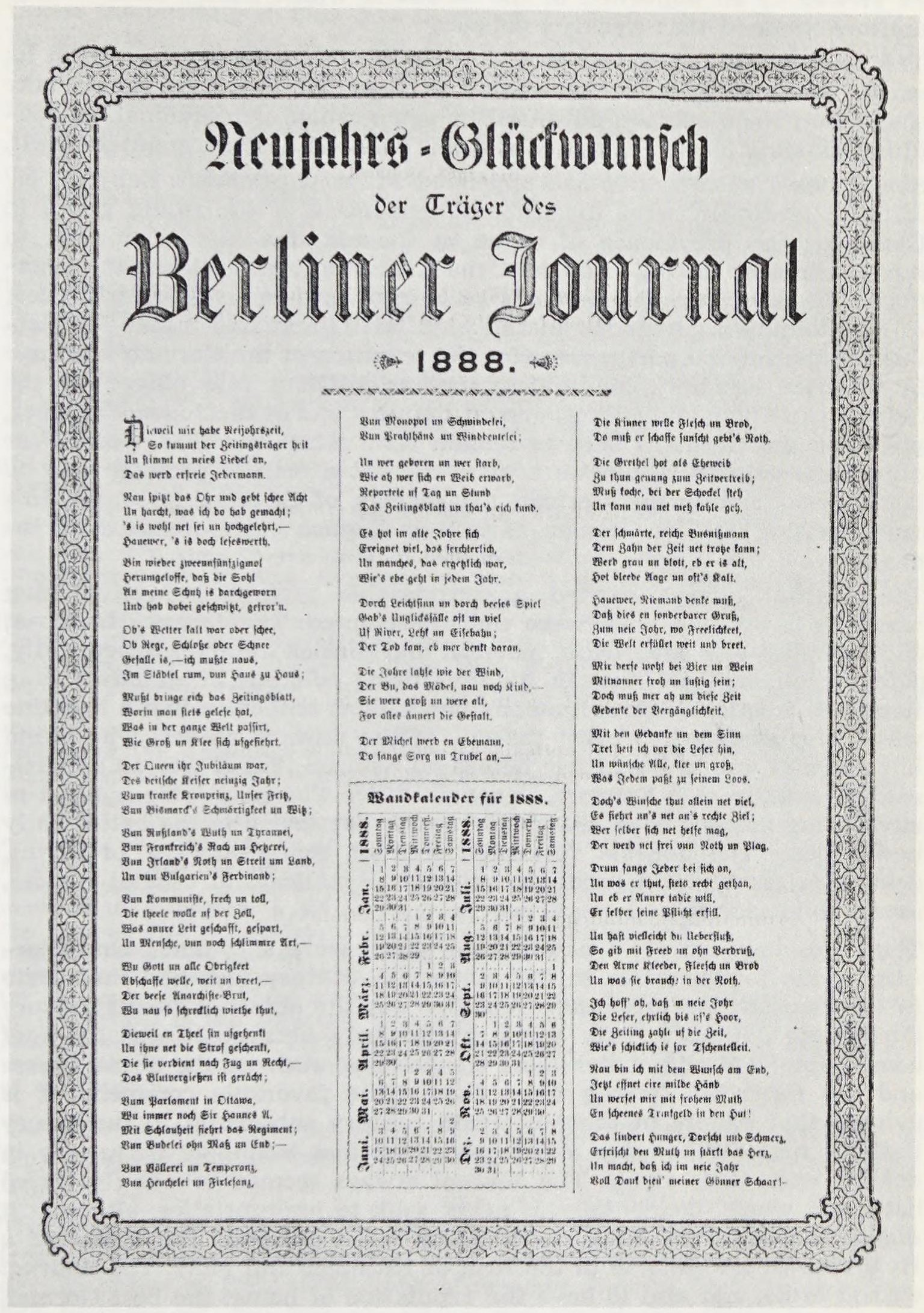
Most German-language newspapers in Ontario issued an annual broadside with a long poem to celebrate the New Year. The Berliner Journal's poem of 1888 (pictured) was written in the local Pennsylvania German dialect.

Name of newspaper, location, frequency, years of publication and political alignment
Newspaper	Place of publication	Frequency	Commenced	Ceased	Political alignment	ISSN / OCLC	Ref.
Berlin Daily News (Note: English-language paper with a German section from February to October 1878.)	Berlin	Daily	1878	1878	—	OCLC 1118979644; OCLC 1157018497	
Berliner Journal / Ontario Journal (Note: The newspaper was renamed Ontario Journal in January 1917 after the 1916 Berlin-to-Kitchener name change. It was forced to publish in English after the government passed an Order in Council on 25 September 1918 banning German publications.)	Berlin (Note: Berlin was renamed Kitchener after a 1916 name change.)	Weekly	1859	1918	Liberal (1859–1904), independent (1904–1918)	OCLC 977929550; OCLC 1147283368	
Canada Museum und Allgemeine Zeitung	Berlin	Weekly	1835 (Note: Historians John English & Kenneth McLaughlin state the paper began in 1833, quoting from a 1931 Waterloo Historical Society piece to justify that dating. However, the piece they quote from provides a date of 27 August 1835 for the paper's first issue. Scholar Herbert Karl Kalbfleisch also writes the first issue ran on 27 August 1835.)	1840	Independent	ISSN 0848-094X; ISSN 0848-0958; OCLC 1081375169; OCLC 1081339960	
Canada Zeitung	Hamilton	Twice weekly	1856	1857	—	—	
Canadische Volkszeitung	Hamilton / London (Note: Ceased publication in April 1875; moved to London and resumed in July 1875.)	Weekly	1872	1876	—	—	
Das Ottawa Echo (Note: While the masthead reads Das Echo, Kalbfleisch refers to the newspaper as Das Ottawa Echo.)	Ottawa	Monthly	1893	1893	—	ISSN 0701-4694; OCLC 1080359890; OCLC 184748222	
das journal	Toronto	Biweekly	2011	2023	—	OCLC 843473149	
Das Wochenblatt	Berlin	Weekly	1878	1878	Conservative	—	
Der Beobachter	Toronto / Preston (Note: Moved from Toronto to Preston within its first year.)	Weekly	1856	1867	—	—	
Der Canadische Bauernfreund (Note: Amalgamated into Berliner Journal on 1 July 1909. (Note: After the Berliner Journal amalgamated the newspaper, it continued to be issued under its original name so as to not upset longtime subscribers, though the actual content of the two papers was identical.))	Waterloo	Weekly	1854	1909	Conservative	ISSN 0839-1661; OCLC 1032863764	
Der Canadische Beobachter	Preston	Weekly	1848	1850	Reform	—	
Der Canadische Kolonist (Note: Amalgamated into Berliner Journal on 1 July 1906.)	Stratford	Weekly	1864	1906	Reform	OCLC 1032863512	
Der Deutsche Canadier und Neuigkeitsbote / Der Deutsche Canadier (Note: Renamed Der Deutsche Canadier at an unspecified date.)	Berlin	Weekly	1841	1865	Reform	OCLC 1119075046	
Der Deutsche in Canada	London / Hamilton (Note: Moved from London to Hamilton in 1872; ceased publication in April 1875; moved to London and resumed in July 1875.)	Monthly	1871	1876	—	ISSN 1190-724X; OCLC 1019385489; OCLC 1087231616	
Der Deutsche Reformer	Waterloo	Weekly	1863	1863	Reform	—	
Der Morgenstern	Waterloo	Weekly	1839	1841	—	ISSN 1181-2125; ISSN 1181-2133; OCLC 1033011981; OCLC 1033141534	
Der Neu-Hamburger Neutrale / Canadisches Volksblatt (Note: Renamed Canadisches Volksblatt in 1859; amalgamated into Der Canadische Bauernfreund on 2 December 1908.)	New Hamburg	Weekly	1855	1908	Conservative	ISSN 1180-6591; ISSN 1180-6605; OCLC 1032860930; OCLC 1081129554	
Der Perth Volksfreund	Stratford / Listowel (Note: Moved from Stratford to Listowel in April 1880.)	—	1878	1883	Conservative	ISSN 1181-4683; OCLC 1032971347	
Der Wächter am Saugeen / Canada National-Zeitung (Note: Suspended publication in mid-1872 and resumed in October; renamed to Canada National-Zeitung in 1879.)	Neustadt	Weekly	1868	1882	Independent	OCLC 1019411663	
Deutsche Post	Arnprior / Pembroke (Note: Moved from Arnprior to Pembroke in 1906.)	Weekly	1901	1916	Independent	ISSN 0842-8026; OCLC 1007474506	
Deutsche Presse	Toronto	Weekly	1977	— (Note: Evidence of publication as late as 2005 in Frisse 2005, p. 857.)	—	ISSN 0846-118X; OCLC 1081383723	
Deutsche Rundschau	Cannington	Monthly	1997	2014	—	ISSN 1206-5781; OCLC 819517622	
Deutsche Zeitung (Note: Stopped publishing in October 1899 and resumed in 1902.)	Berlin	Weekly	1891	1908	Conservative	ISSN 1180-6109; OCLC 1081084316	
Deutscher Canadier (Note: An attempted revival of Der Deutsche Canadier, unrelated to the Deutscher Canadier Und Allgemeiner Anzeiger.)	Berlin	Weekly	1869	1870	—	—	
Deutscher Canadier Und; Allgemeiner Anzeiger (Note: An attempted revival of Der Deutsche Canadier.)	Berlin	Weekly	1867	1869	—	—	
Die Aytoner Fama / Der Canadische Volksfreund (Note: Moved from Ayton to Neustadt and renamed Der Canadische Volksfreund in 1890.)	Ayton / Neustadt	Weekly	1882	1892	—	—	
Die Post	Walkerton	—	1878	1879	Reform	—	
Die Prestoner Zeitung	Preston	Weekly	1856	1857	—	—	
Die Wespe	Wartburg	Weekly	c. 1871 (Note: The first mention of the newspaper is in an 1871 edition of Alexander J. Schem's Deutsch-Amerikanisches Conversations-Lexicon.)	c. 1871–1872 (Note: An 1873 issue of Alexander J. Schem's Deutsch-Amerikanisches Conversations-Lexicon does not mention Die Wespe in a list of Canadian German newspapers, implying it folded before 1873.)	—	—	
Elmira Anzeiger	Elmira	Weekly	1870	1882	—	—	
Freie Presse	Berlin	Weekly	1886	1888	Conservative	ISSN 1180-6834; OCLC 1081362174	
Hamburger Beobachter	New Hamburg	Weekly	1852	1856	Reform	ISSN 1180-6613; OCLC 1081374456	
Hamilton Anzeiger (Note: Published as a special edition of Der Perth Volksfreund.)	Hamilton	—	1879	1879	Conservative	—	
Kitchener Journal	Kitchener	—	1967	1969	—	ISSN 0837-0818; OCLC 1007733706	
Neue Presse	Toronto	Weekly	2003	—	—	ISSN 1705-8082; OCLC 1083190036	
The Hofbräuhaus News	Ottawa	Quarterly	2002	2014	—	ISSN 0226-6709; OCLC 1080362164	
Walkerton Glocke / Die Ontario Glocke (Note: Renamed Die Ontario Glocke in 1882; amalgamated into Berliner Journal on 1 July 1904.)	Walkerton	Weekly	1870	1904	Conservative	ISSN 0842-9332; OCLC 1016229515; OCLC 1007187387	
Welland Deutscher Telegraph	Welland	Weekly	1885	1886	—	—	

== See also ==
- List of early Canadian newspapers
- List of defunct newspapers of Canada
- History of Canadian newspapers
- German Canadians
- List of German-language newspapers published in the United States
