= John Adam Rittinger =

Canadian newspaper editor, humorist

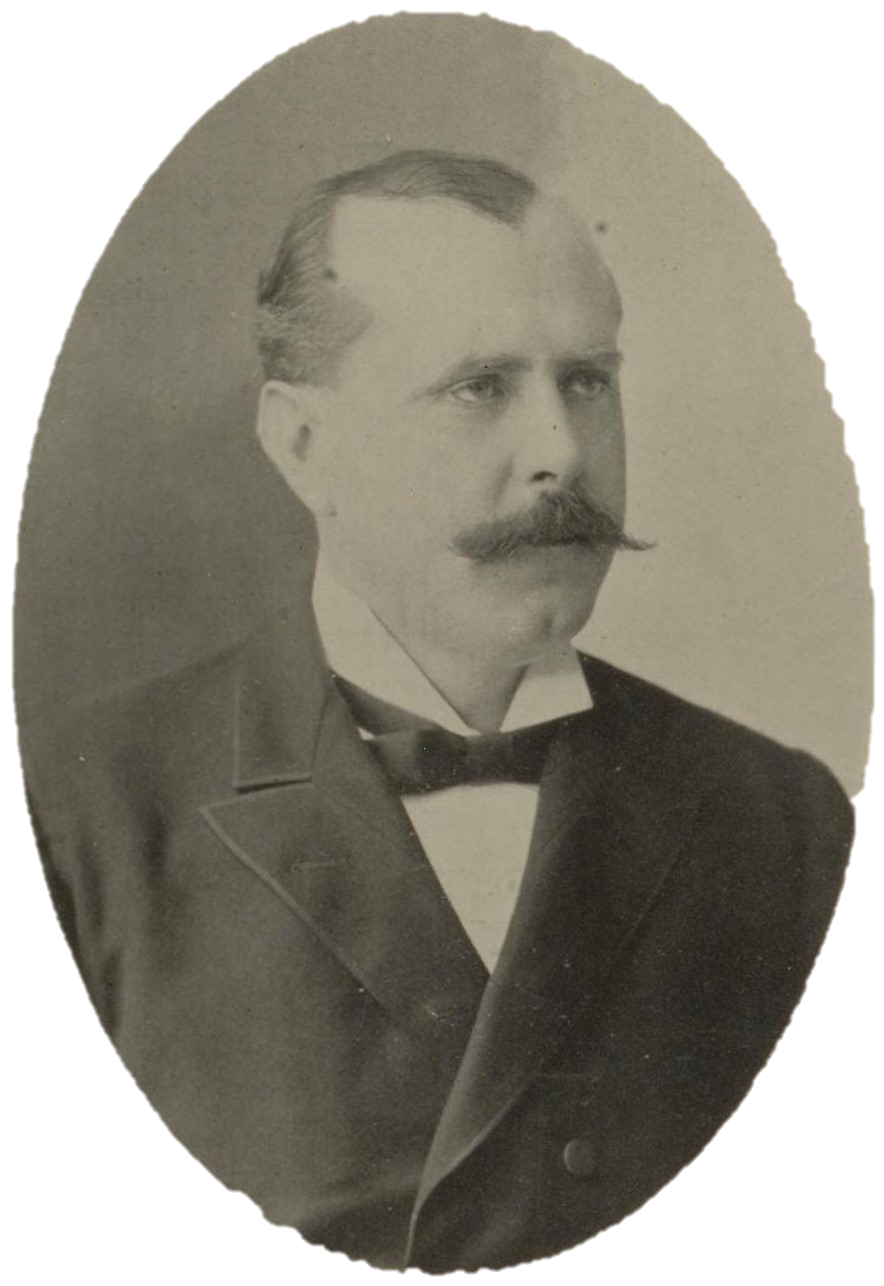
- Rittinger, undated
- Born: 16 February 1855; Berlin, Canada West, Province of Canada
- Died: 29 July 1915 (aged 60); Berlin, Ontario, Canada
- Resting place: Walkerton, Ontario; 44°06′58″N 81°08′42″W
- Occupations: Newspaper proprietor; editor; humorist
- Father: Friedrich Rittinger

John Adam Rittinger (16 February 1855 – 29 July 1915) was a Canadian German-language-newspaper proprietor, editor and Pennsylvania-German humorist. In 1875, he and Aaron Eby purchased Walkerton, Ontario's German-language newspaper, the Walkerton Glocke. Affectionately known by locals as the "Glockemann" ("Bell Ringer"), Rittinger was both a shrewd businessman and a popular writer. He became the paper's sole owner in 1878, renaming it Die Ontario Glocke in 1882. A staunch conservative, he used the editorial column to comment on domestic political issues, advocating for the National Policy, individual freedoms and the teaching of the German language in Ontario schools while opposing prohibition and nativism. When the Glocke amalgamated into Berlin, Ontario's Berliner Journal in 1904, he became the Journal's editor-in-chief, a position he held until his death in 1915.

Rittinger began writing humorous letters to the editor in 1890, signing them under the pseudonym Joe Klotzkopp (Joe the Blockhead). For the next twenty-five years, he continued to publish the popular Briefe vun Joe Klotzkopp, Esq. (Letters of Joe Klotzkopp, Esq.) in both the Glocke and later the Journal. The writings uniquely and humorously combine the Pennsylvania German dialect with phonetic reproductions of English words, and are today appreciated by scholars as "superb examples of German-Canadian comic literature in dialect".

== Early years and family ==
The son of Friedrich Rittinger and Elisabeth Geiger, John Adam Rittinger was born on 16 February 1855 in Berlin, Canada West (now Kitchener, Ontario). Rittinger's father immigrated to Canada from Michaelbach, Baden, in 1847. Rittinger's two brothers – William and Herman – worked on the staff of their father's German-language newspaper, the Berliner Journal, while his sister married a Lutheran minister, Julius Badke.

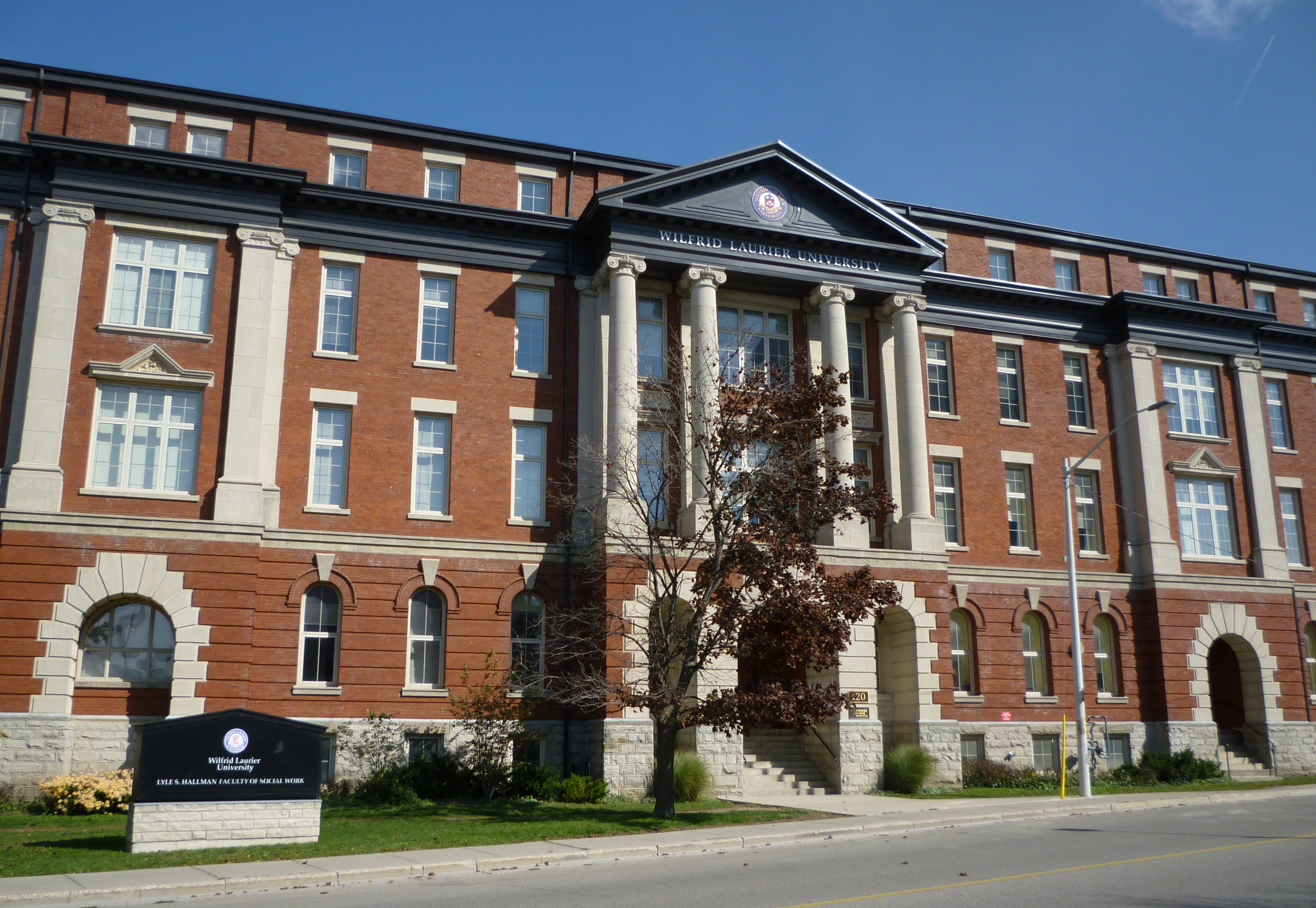
In 1873, Rittinger graduated from St. Jerome's College (pictured, 2012). His education under the school's founder, Louis Funcken, influenced his writings and political views.

Rittinger attended public school in Berlin before going to the local Roman Catholic school, St. Jerome's College. Studying under Louis Funcken, a Friar and the school's founder, Rittinger's later views were heavily influenced by Funcken's teachings, especially promoting the German-language, emphasizing civic duty and criticizing the anti-liberal trends in Germany and Prussia. When Funcken died in 1890, Rittinger provided a eulogy, expressing: "[M]any able and useful citizens made their first higher studies under him. The good influence he exerted on his pupils, even in later years, was astonishing. They were still to him his 'dear boys' of former years, were they priests, lawyers or even editors." In a 1911 letter, Funcken's brother Julius wrote of the Berliner Journal – by then under the editorship of Rittinger – that "we believe we are not mistaken when we see Louis' views in the trends of the paper." Rittinger remained active with the College after his 1873 graduation, considering it a point of pride that he became the Alumni Union's first ever Protestant President. (Note: Historians Kenneth McLaughlin, Gerald J. Stortz and James A. Wahl write he became Alumni Union President in 1890, while historians Jesse Middleton and Fred Landon write he served from 1889 to 1893.) He furthered his education by working in the office of his father's Berliner Journal, as well as in the printing offices of newspapers in Guelph, Toronto, Buffalo, New York City and Chicago.

Returning to Ontario from America in 1875, Rittinger married Mary Jane Rodgerson on 22 January 1877 in Owen Sound, Ontario. (Note: Sometimes spelled Rogerson.) Born in Bowmanville, Rodgerson was the daughter of John and Jean Rodgerson. She and Rittinger had one son, Frederick, whom Rittinger groomed to be an eventual successor in the newspaper business. Frederick did not live beyond his teens, dying on 9 November 1895 of an abdominal abscess. (Note: Middleton and Landon write Frederick was born on 12 July 1872 and died on 9 November 1895. This implies he lived to twenty-three, yet they write he died "in the seventeenth year of his age", implying he was born in 1878. Leibbrandt writes he died "at the age of seventeen".) In the wake of his loss, Rittinger became more deeply involved in community affairs and became one of the most popular men in Bruce and Grey Counties. Interested in music, he served as second Vice-President of the Berlin Musical Society in the early 20th century, and later worked as the organist at his Lutheran Church in Walkerton, Ontario. He served on his church's council, was the chairman of the Walkerton High School Board and was a member of Berlin's Parks Board until February 1915.

== Career ==
=== Die Ontario Glocke (1875–1904) ===
In December 1875, Rittinger and Dr. Aaron Eby – a Canadian-born Pennsylvania German – purchased Walkerton, Ontario's German-language newspaper from its founder, John Klein. Rittinger and Eby's partnership over the Walkerton Glocke lasted until June 1878. Rittinger, a staunch conservative and member of the Conservative Party, continued work at the Glocke while Eby, an advocate of the Reformers, left to form his own competing newspaper. (Note: Eby's Die Post ceased soon after its founding, folding in January 1879.) In 1882, Rittinger renamed the Walkerton Glocke to Die Ontario Glocke and expanded it from four to eight pages. In his role as publisher and editor, he was both a popular writer and a shrewd businessman. He built the Glocke's subscriber count from around 350 in 1878 to between 1,300 and 1,400 in 1883. By 1891, the newspaper was debt-free, even after having acquired a new steam press in 1883 for $1,600 (equivalent to CA$51,000 in 2025). Affectionately known by locals as the "Glockemann" (the "Bell Ringer"), he knew nearly every subscriber personally.

The Glocke featured an editorial column written by Rittinger, mostly focusing on domestic political issues. After he became the sole owner, the newspaper leaned Conservative in its political commentary, especially favouring its high tariff National Policy, opposition to both prohibition and nativism, and a strong focus on individual freedom. When he disagreed with the party, he made his opposition known, especially with regard to the Conservative's opposition to German-language instruction in Ontario schools. To remain politically active in the community, he was president of the Conservative Association in Bruce County and was a member of the executive committee of Berlin's Conservative Party organization.

=== Berliner Journal (1904–1915) ===
Rittinger's father Friedrich died in 1897, and Rittinger succeeded him as a partner in the Rittinger and Motz printing firm. Die Ontario Glocke amalgamated into the Berliner Journal on 1 July 1904, and Rittinger moved back to Berlin to work as its new editor. Though the content of the two papers was identical, the Glocke continued to publish under its original masthead so as not to offend longtime subscribers. Due to a declining German-language readership, the remaining local German-language newspapers were also consolidated into the Berliner Journal – including Stratford's Canadische Kolonist in July 1906, and both New Hamburg's Canadische Volksblatt and Waterloo's Canadischer Bauernfreund in July 1909. (Note: The Canadische Volksblatt amalgamated into the Canadischer Bauernfreund on 2 December 1908.) By the early twentieth century, the assimilation of the local German community into the English majority had progressed quickly. While many locals no longer spoke German with the same fluency they once had, the popularity of Rittinger's editorship maintained much of the paper's appeal.

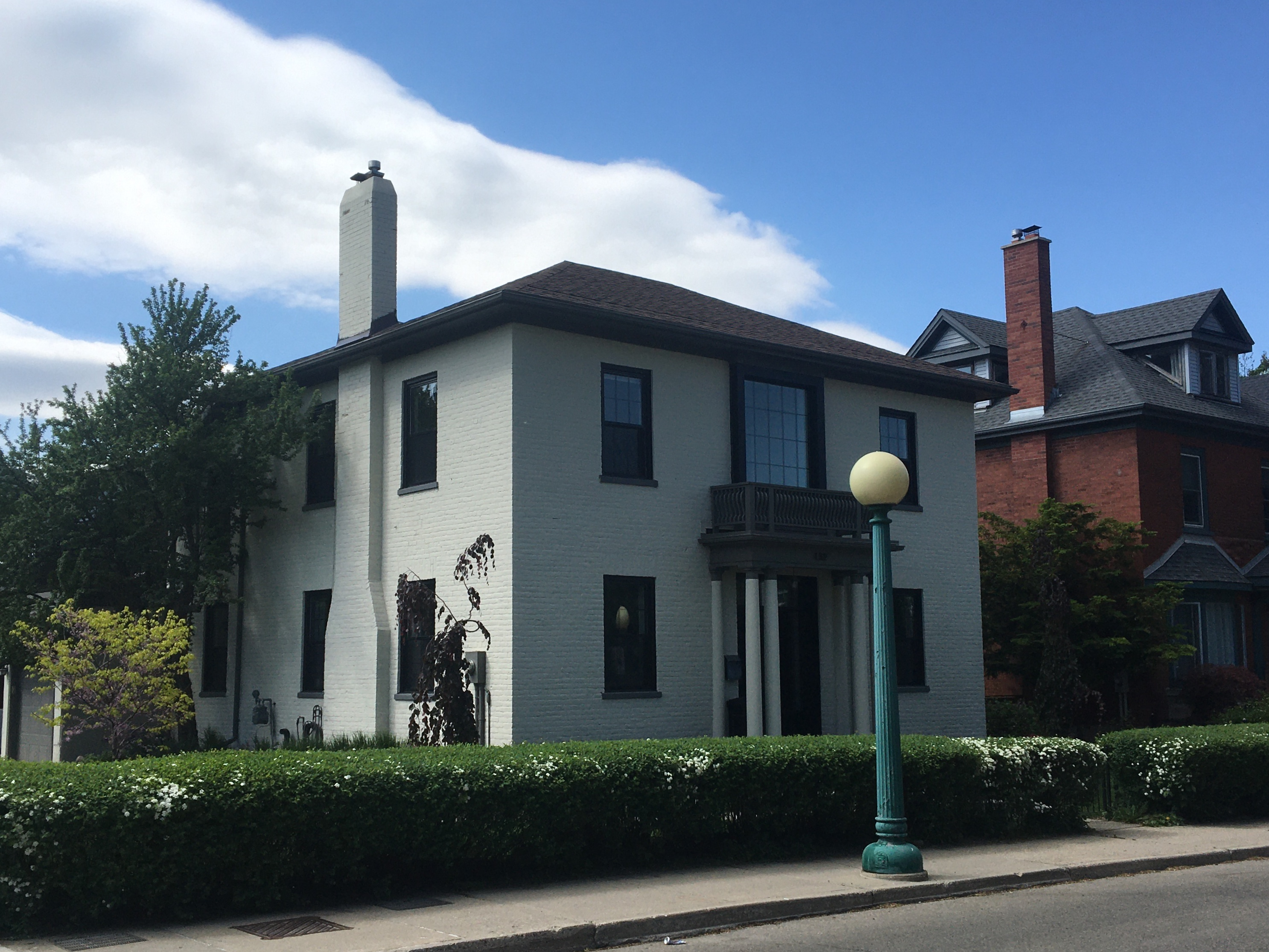
The Rittinger family home in 2021, where Rittinger died in July 1915

Scholar Herbert Karl Kalbfleisch writes that after the Glocke amalgamated into the Journal and Rittinger became its editor, "[a] distinct improvement in every department becomes evident". The newspaper's political slant shifted from conservative to independent, though Rittinger still engaged extensively in contemporary politics through his editorial column. He presided over an expansion in the readership of the Journal, adding six hundred new subscribers in the year following the amalgamation. With an average circulation of 5,154 for the year ending 31 December 1909, the paper was the most widely read German publication in all of Canada. Circulation numbers never reached the same peak, usually declining each year, and fell to 4,419 for the year ending 1914.

In 1914, Rittinger suffered an injury to his right hip. A resulting illness led to his death on 29 July 1915, dying at his Berlin home at 132 Queen St. N. His body was interred in Walkerton next to his son Frederick. The day after Rittinger's death, The New York Times ran an obituary characterizing him as "one of the best known German journalists in Canada". His death came before a sharp decline in German-Canadian journalism; the Canadian government banned German-language publications in 1918. Kalbfleisch writes: "Fate spared [Rittinger] the trials and disappointments of the most critical years of the First World War, and called him away just before the edifice, which he had so painstakingly helped to construct, toppled into ruin."

== Letters of Joe Klotzkopp, Esq. ==
=== Content ===
Rittinger published his first humorous letter to the editor in the 22 January 1890 edition of the Glocke, signed under the pseudonym "Joe Klotzkopp". (Note: Kalbfleisch writes the first letter "seems to have appeared in the Glocke on January 22, 1890." Both Tötösy de Zepetnek and scholar Georg K. Weissenborn write the letters began in 1890, while Hayes says they began in 1895.) The name translates to English from the Pennsylvania German as either "Joe the Blockhead" or "John the Blockhead". He published occasional letters through November. After their disappearance, subscriber demand led to their resumption the following year, with Rittinger continuing to write and publish them for the next twenty-five years.

A short while ago I was at a temperance meeting. The lecturer lambasted the use of alcohol and opined: "The quantity of intoxicating liquor consumed in this country makes me dizzy." A man at the back of the hall, who tried his best to keep himself upright by clinging to the plaster on the wall, suddenly shouted: "me too!"

— Joe Klotzkopp, Die Ontario Glocke, 13 December 1893. Translated by Herbert Karl Kalbfleisch.

The letters uniquely and humorously combine the Pennsylvania German dialect with phonetic reproductions of English words. The dialect was common among the Germans of nineteenth-century Ontario, and German-language newspapers across Upper and Lower Canada and Nova Scotia regularly published letters using it. Rittinger originally learned High German, and acquired the dialect later in life. His character Joe Klotzkopp is "a poor, but easy-going farmer", living with his wife Särah Klotzkopp near Neustadt, Ontario, in Bruce County. The letters describe contemporary Upper Canadian life, injecting humour into the rural life of German Canadians, while using levity to impart serious moral lessons.

=== Retrospective assessment and legacy ===
Scholar Gottlieb Leibbrandt writes that the letters are of particular interest to scholars as "superb examples of German-Canadian comic literature in dialect." Researcher Steven Tötösy de Zepetnek suggests that because the letters are restricted thematically to contemporaneous issues, their value to modern scholars resides in studying their style and use of language, along with "their humoristic and ironic mode of narration." Scholar Hermann Boeschenstein writes that the letters mediate between European and Canadian cultures, and that "Rittinger proved ... that immigration can be conducive to the exchange and dissemination of valuable experience and ideas". Leibbrandt, Tötösy de Zepetnek and Kalbfleisch agree that Rittinger's writings rank him among the greatest of Canadian humorists. Kalbfleisch remarks that Rittinger's "wit and humour were ever present adjunct to his racy and picturesque style", especially within the Joe Klotzkopp letters. He compares Rittinger's work to that of Thomas Chandler Haliburton and Stephen Leacock, and ultimately concludes that "[h]ad he written in the English language his reputation in Canada would now be secure." By comparison, scholar E. W. Herd characterizes the letters as "naïve and popular". He opines that their humour is more easily appreciated by a Pennsylvania German reader, while "for other readers the parody is not so obvious, and the humour loses its spice".

The letters remain relatively inaccessible to the public, both because they have never been published in a collection and because most German readers are unfamiliar with the Pennsylvania-German dialect they use. The originals as published in the Glocke and Journal are available in the Waterloo Region Record's archives, while Boeschenstein collected several in his 1980 book Heiteres und Satirisches aus der Deutschkanadischen Literatur (Light Satiric Pieces from German Canadian Literature). Kalbfleisch translated 80 of the original 120 letters which the Record ran in a series from March 1966 through 1967. Kalbfleisch includes an 1893 letter opposing Canada's temperance movement in his 1968 book The History of the Pioneer German Language Press of Ontario, 1835–1918. Leibbrandt includes the 1909 letter "Mad Donkey Hotel" alongside Kalbfleisch's English translation in his 1980 book Little Paradise. Hayes includes Kalbfleisch's translation of the final April 1915 letter in his 1997 book, Waterloo County: An Illustrated History.

== See also ==
- List of German-language newspapers of Ontario
- List of oldest buildings and structures in the Regional Municipality of Waterloo
