= William Schmalz =

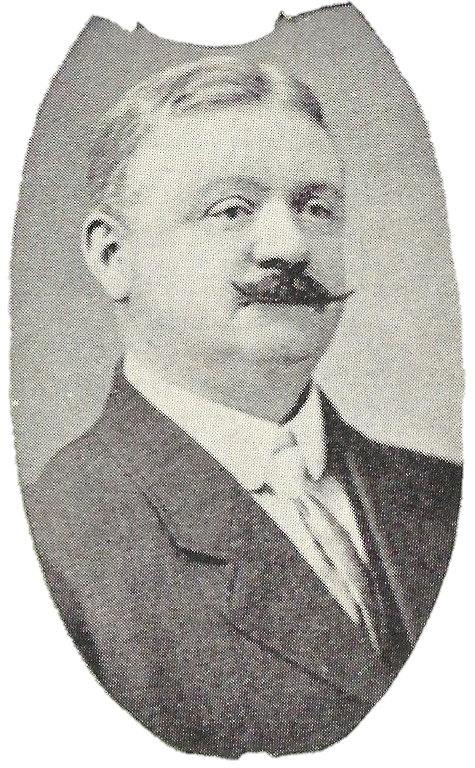
W. H. Schmalz, 1912

William Henry Schmalz (December 31, 1862 – May 9, 1933) was an insurance company executive, painter and politician in Ontario, Canada. He served as mayor of Berlin (later renamed to Kitchener) from 1911 to 1912.

== Early life and education ==
Schmalz's parents came to Canada West from Hesse in 1854. In 1878, at 15 years old, Schmalz joined the Economical Mutual Fire Insurance Company as a policy writer. In 1908, he became managing director. Schmalz worked for the company until 1933. Schmalz served 18 years on the hospital board, including three as president. He was also a member of the Board of Trade. With W.J. Morris, he managed the Berliner Journal.

== Personal life ==
He married Eleanor Oelschlager. He then went on to have a son named William Henry Eugene Schmalz. His son was an architect and designed the first city hall for the city of Kitchener.

== Career ==
He was one of the foremost Canadian philatelists of his time, owning 45,000 stamps. Schmalz was also a singer in a number of choirs and played cornet in the Berlin orchestra. He died in 1933 and was buried at Mount Hope Cemetery in Kitchener.
