= George Rumpel (manufacturer) =

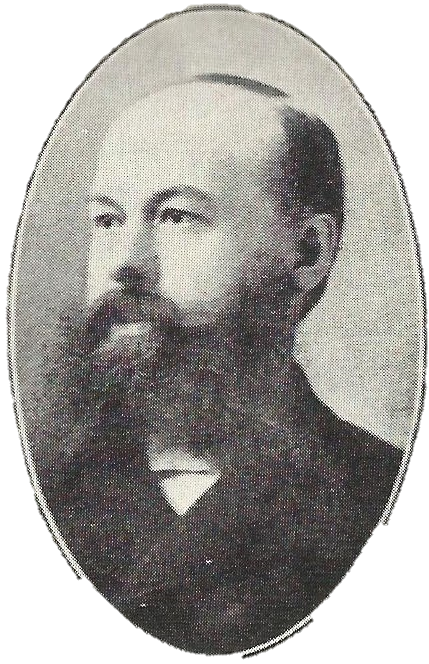
George Rumpel

George Rumpel (May 10, 1850 – 1916) was a German-born manufacturer and politician in Ontario, Canada. He served as mayor of Berlin in 1898.

The son of Frederick Rumpel and Fredericka Rick, he was born in Saxony and apprenticed as a shoemaker. Rumpel worked in twelve different factories in Germany before coming to Canada in 1868, first settling in Hamilton, where he worked as a shoemaker for five years. In 1872, he married Minna Hartman. In 1875, he came to Berlin, where he worked at the Berlin Felt Boot Company. Rumpel bought the company in 1879. In 1903, he returned to Germany with his two sons to study advanced felt-making techniques. By the time he sold the company in 1909, it was employing 300 workers. He continued on as president until 1912 when he formed the Rumpel Felt Company. The family also owned the Berlin Asbestos Mine in northern Quebec. The felt factory continued to operate under family ownership until 2007.

Rumpel served as chair of the Water Works Commission and was also a member of the Parks Board. He was also a member of the local Board of Trade.

He died in 1916 and was buried at Mount Hope Cemetery in Kitchener.

In 2013, Heritage Kitchener received a report recommending that the Rumpel Felt Building be designated as a heritage building by the city of Kitchener. The city plans to construct a central transit station in the area.
