= Newspaper extra =

Special issue of a newspaper

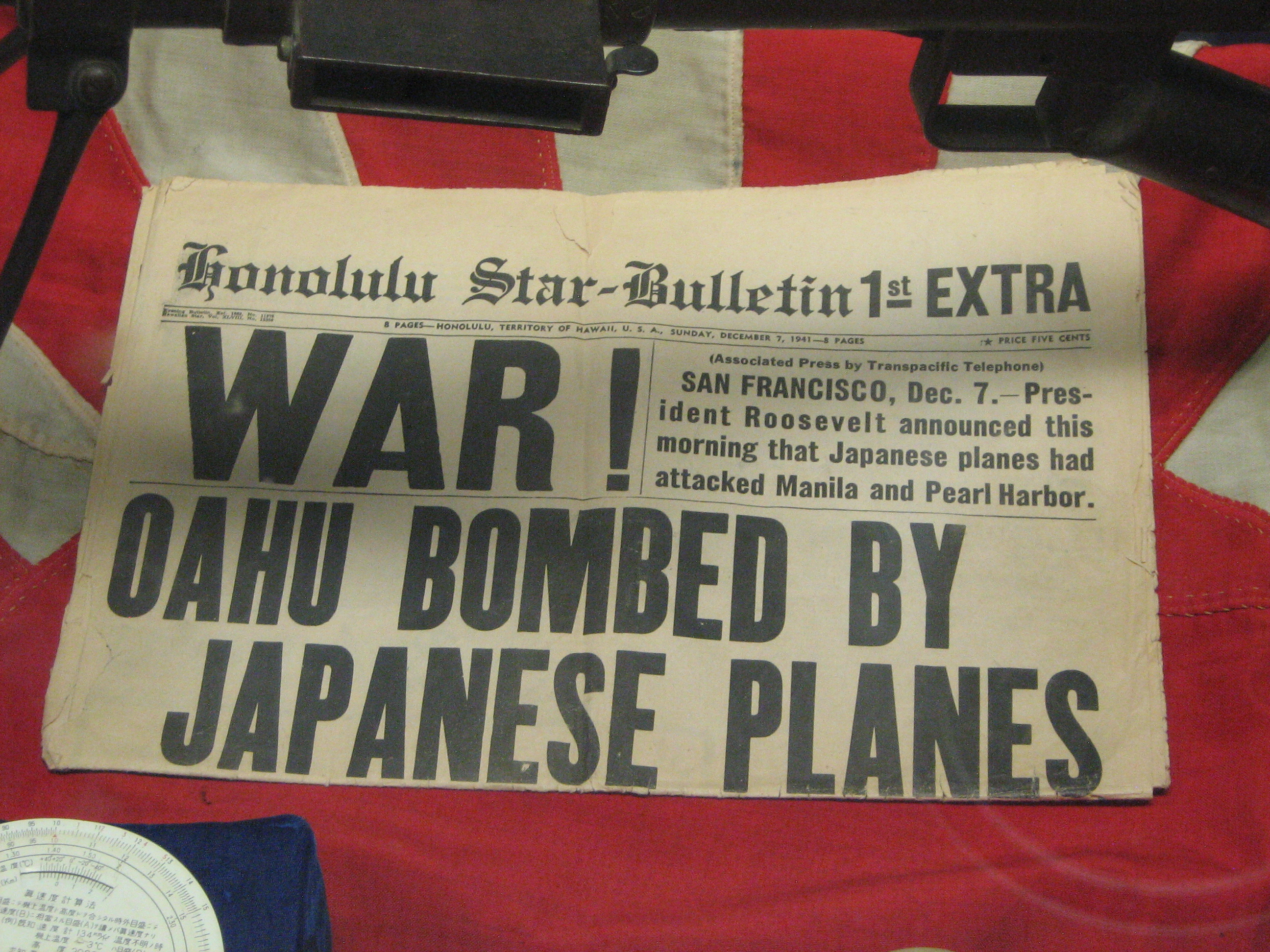
Extra edition of the Honolulu Star-Bulletin following the attack on Pearl Harbor

A newspaper extra, extra edition, special edition, or simply extra is a special issue of a newspaper published outside the regular schedule to report major or breaking news that arrived too late for the standard edition, such as the outbreak of war, the assassination of a public figure, or key developments in a high-profile trial.

It evolved from the earlier broadside, a single-sided sheet intended to be posted in public places.

Beginning in the mid-19th century United States, street vendors, usually called newsboys, would call out, "Extra! Extra! Read all about it!" when selling extras. This phrase later became a catchphrase often used to introduce dramatic events in films.

With the rise of radio, extras became largely obsolete in the early 1930s in areas with good radio coverage, replaced by breaking news bulletins. However, extras have occasionally appeared in the 21st century. For example, several North American newspapers published an extra on the afternoon of September 11, 2001, to report the terrorist attacks, even if they had not issued extras for years prior.

== See also ==
- Scoop (news)
