= New Hamburg, Ontario =

New Hamburg
- Unincorporated community
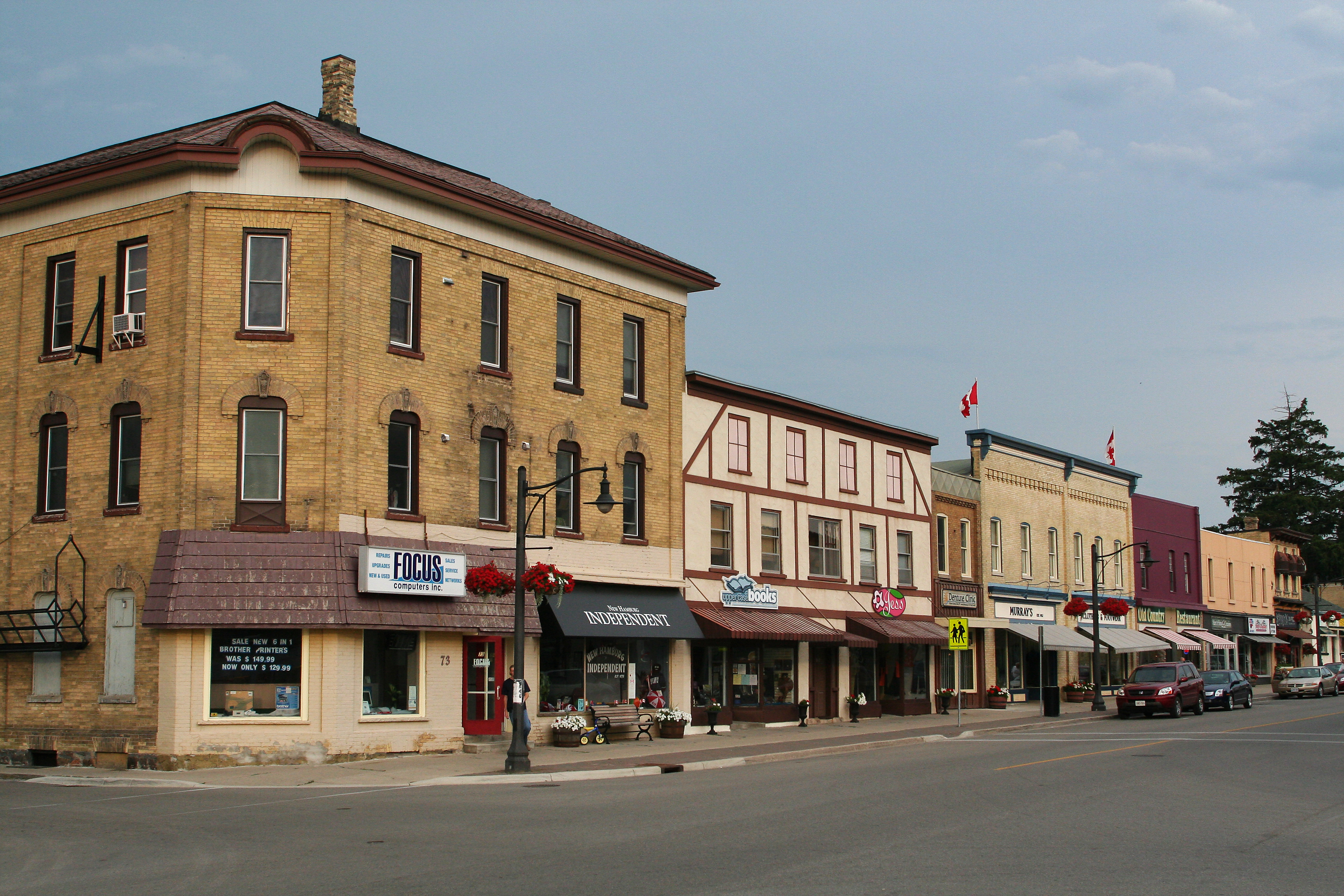
- Peel Street in New Hamburg

- Location within Regional Municipality of Waterloo Location within Southern Ontario Location within Canada
- Coordinates: 43°22′44″N 80°42′39″W
- Country: Canada
- Province: Ontario
- Regional municipality: Waterloo
- Township: Wilmot
- Incorporated: 1857 (as a village)
- Incorporated: 1966 (as a town)

Population (2016)
  - Total: 13,595
  - Density: 971/km^{2} (2,510/sq mi)
- Time zone: UTC-5 (EST)
  - Summer (DST): UTC-4 (EDT)
- Forward sortation area: N3A
- Area codes: 519 and 226
- NTS Map: 40P7 Stratford
- GNBC Code: FEBVH

New Hamburg is a community of approximately 11,953 (2011 stats) in the township of Wilmot, Ontario, Canada. It is in the far western part of the Regional Municipality of Waterloo, near the regional border with Perth County. It is adjacent to the community of Baden, which sits to its east and is also a part of the township of Wilmot. The nearest cities are Kitchener, Waterloo, and Stratford.

The Nith River winds throughout the town and flows through the downtown core, which is home to a 50-foot waterwheel made of wood, being built in 1990. This wooden wheel was torn down on March 15, 2023, and replaced with a metal recreation of the wheel.

The weekly newspapers serving the community are the Wilmot-Tavistock Gazette and the New Hamburg Independent. The downtown has been designated a Heritage Conservation District.

== History ==
Located on the Nith River just over 20 kilometres (12 mi) from Berlin (now Kitchener) this settlement was in an area with rich soil. The settlement was laid out in 1832 and was settled primarily by Germans, both Mennonites and others, direct from Germany. A historical plaque honours Josiah Cushman, an Amish Mennonite from Germany. Likely to have been the first settler, Cushman arrived in the early 1830s. He dammed Smith's Creek and built a sawmill that helped attract others. The first name of the community was Cassel and then Hamburgh; by 1840, the name was changed to New Hamburg.

William Scott, (known as Lord Campfield in Scotland), arrived in 1838, after Cushman's death. He renamed Smith's Creek the Nith River, built a new dam, and constructed a new lumber sawmill. The mill continued to plane lumber until 1902 when it burned down; the replacement building was a feed mill, later known as B-W Feed and Seed. That entity still exists, now as a sales outlet for feed. Now considered to be the founder of New Hamburg, William Scott's career included work as a Justice of the Peace, Community School Commissioner, New Hamburg's first Postmaster, Wilmot Town Councillor, Reeve and the Lt. Colonel of the 5th Battalion of the Waterloo Infantry.

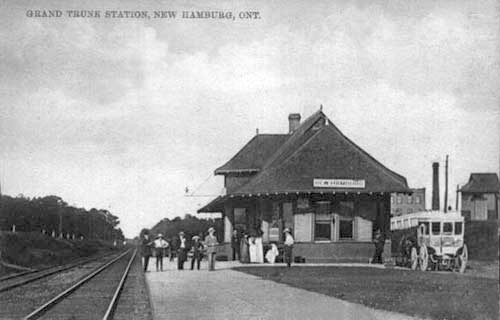
The Grand Trunk Railway station in New Hamburg, c. 1915.

The New Hamburg post office was established by William Scott in 1851. At that time, the population was 500 and there was a pottery, a carriage works, and a foundry. The Grand Trunk Railway reached the area in 1856 and helped the village to establish milling and farm machinery manufacturing. By 1858, the population was 1,000; the settlement included many mills and factories, several general stores, and eight taverns.

New Hamburg was incorporated as a Village in 1857, with a population of about 1100. The river was an excellent source of power for two wool factories and two flour mills in 1864. There was also a foundry that manufactured agricultural implements. Several large companies made carriages, buggies and wagons. By that time there were three churches and a school with 100 students. In 1869 the population was 1,400.

New Hamburg became a town in 1966.

== Notable people ==
- NHL hockey analyst, Howie Meeker, was raised here. He was named a Member of the Order of Canada in 2010.

== Notable landmarks ==
- New Hamburg hosts the largest Mopar Festival in Canada (in July or August).
- New Hamburg was once home to the largest working wooden waterwheel in North America. it has since been replaced by a metal recreation.

== See also ==
- List of population centres in Ontario
