= Berlin-to-Kitchener name change =

1916 city referendum in Ontario, Canada

Berlin name-change referendum
- May 19, 1916
- Are you in favour of changing the name of this city?

Results
| Choice | Votes | % |
|---|---|---|
| Yes | 1,569 | 51.32% |
| No | 1,488 | 48.68% |
| Total votes | 3,057 | 100.00% |
| Registered voters/turnout | 4,897 | 62.43% |
- Sources: McKegney 1991, pp. 177–178 and Wilson 1977a, p. lxxix

The city of Berlin, Ontario, Canada, changed its name to Kitchener by referendum in May and June 1916. Named in 1833 after the capital of Prussia and later the German Empire, the name Berlin became unsavoury for residents after Britain and Canada's entry into the First World War.

In the 19th and 20th centuries, most residents of Berlin and neighbouring Waterloo were of German origin. (Note: Before the unification of Germany in 1871, the use of "German" did not refer to a single nation state. The immigrants' area of origin was often designated as "Germany" and was technically within the Holy Roman Empire, but McLaughlin writes it is "more properly defined as 'Mitteleuropa'." Those who immigrated to Canada before the unification understood that their family had left an area of what became the German nation state or from an area that shared its culture and language.) The towns and their citizens lived peacefully and enjoyed a unique blend of German and British culture. Following Britain and Canada's entry into war against Germany in August 1914, German Canadians experienced increasing anti-German sentiment. In early 1916, business and community leaders began pushing for Berlin to either seek a new name or amalgamate with Waterloo. Rising tension in the community culminated in soldiers of the local 118th Battalion ransacking German social clubs and attacking an outspoken German Lutheran preacher.

In a vote characterized by intimidation, the May 19, 1916 referendum on whether to change the city name decided "yes" by a slim margin. A vote held the following month to determine a replacement name saw lower voter turnout. The vote settled on Kitchener, named for the recently deceased British Army officer Horatio Herbert Kitchener. Kitchener prevailed in a tight race over the only serious competitor, Brock – for Isaac Brock, a British military leader in the War of 1812. The city officially changed names on September 1, 1916.

Towns across the English-speaking world retreated from their German culture during the First World War. Similar situations arose in the United States and Australia, though the Berlin-to-Kitchener change distinguished itself by the levels of violence and protest. The name change failed to assuage outside suspicion of the city and its German population, propelled partly by opponents unsuccessfully petitioning the Ontario Government to stop the change from proceeding as well as the election of an anti-conscription candidate in Waterloo North in the 1917 federal election. After the war, the city experienced a decline in its German culture with German Canadians being culturally assimilated into the broader Canadian identity.

== Background ==
The first Mennonites from Pennsylvania to settle in what became Berlin, Ontario, originally called the area by multiple names, including Eby's Town, Ebytown, Ben Eby's or Sandhills. An influx of German-speaking European immigrants beginning in the 1820s prompted the local community leaders Benjamin Eby and Joseph Schneider to change the Upper Canadian hamlet's name to Berlin in 1833. In the 1870s, most residents of Berlin and neighbouring Waterloo, Ontario, were of German origin, comprising 73 and 80 per cent of each population, respectively. Many Germans immigrated to Canada to escape the conflicts of Europe and were inclusive of the town's Anglo-Saxon population. Most immigrants arrived before the Völkisch movement spawned in the late 19th century, resulting in a German community less concerned with German nationalism than those who immigrated to western Canada after the 1870s. Historians John English and Kenneth McLaughlin write that the common background of both employers and employees in Berlin allowed for a softening of racial and social animosity.

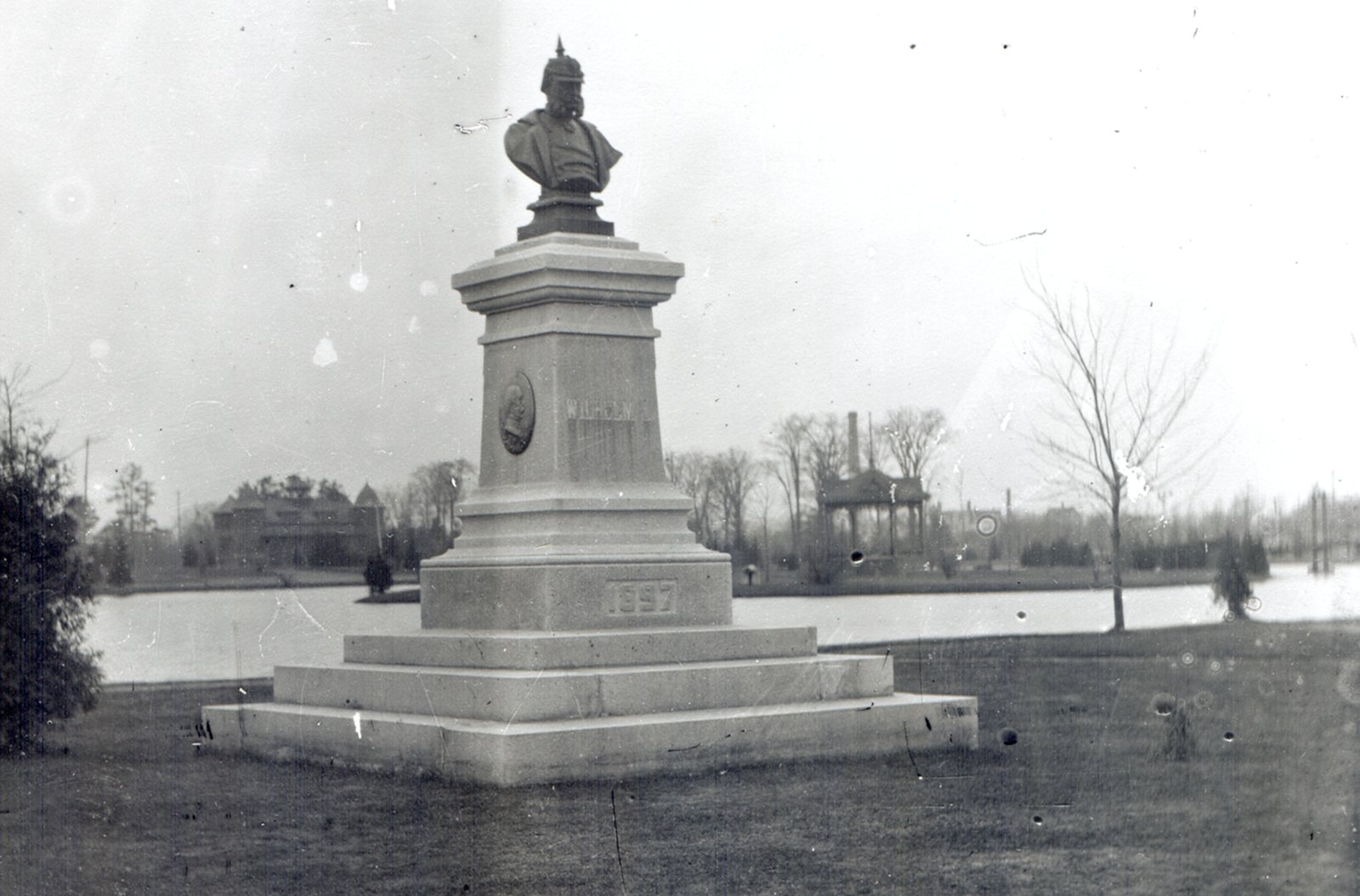
A bust of Kaiser Wilhelm I was dedicated in Berlin's Victoria Park in 1897, pictured here in 1905.

Berliners displayed a simultaneous loyalty to both the British Empire and to their German heritage. Germans pointed to the relationship between the British and German royal families, such as the marriage of the English Queen Victoria to the German Prince Albert, as a source of pride. In May 1871, the towns held a joint German heritage celebration, attracting around 12,000 participants. The Friedensfest, or "Peace Festival", marked the end of the Franco-Prussian War, resulting in the unification of Germany. The strength of the British-German relationship was such that the German festival closed with "God Save the Queen". Historian Geoffrey Hayes writes that the festival – and subsequent Sängerfeste, or song festivals – served as a way for German-speaking residents to develop their German-Canadian identity in a way acceptable to other Canadians. The nine Sängerfeste held from 1874 to 1912 in Berlin and Waterloo generated positive national press coverage and large crowds of visitors.

Berlin residents often displayed both the Union Jack and the German flag next to one another. Visiting royalty and politicians – including the Governor General, the Marquis of Lorne; Princess Louise; the Duke of Connaught; and the former Princess Louise Margaret of Prussia – praised the bonds displayed between the British and German populations of Berlin and Waterloo. Based on a model by sculptor Reinhold Begas, the community leaders George Rumpel and John Motz dedicated a bust of Kaiser Wilhelm I in Victoria Park in August 1897. Residents saw the bust as symbolically representing the bond between Germany and Britain. Government support for the project was strong, Canadian Prime Minister Wilfrid Laurier ensuring the bust entered Canada duty-free. By the early 20th century, few residents considered themselves wholly German, instead identifying as German-Canadian. The 1911 census listed 76 per cent of people in the community as being of German origin, most of whom had never been to Germany. Among Waterloo's residents, 90 per cent were born in Canada. Berliners avidly embraced their German heritage, with celebrations commemorating the birthdays of Otto von Bismarck and the Kaiser typical. In February 1914, while celebrating Kaiser Wilhelm II's 55th birthday, W. H. Schmalz addressed Waterloo's Concordia Club:

We Germans, even if we are also Canadians, remember this occasion from year to year in order to demonstrate our love and respect for a monarch of whom the world may be proud. We are British subjects ... but while we proclaim this truth, I might add, to ourselves, we are also prepared to continue to cultivate our beautiful German customs.

== World War I ==
=== Outbreak ===
Britain declared war on Germany on August 4, 1914. As a Dominion of the British Empire, Canada automatically entered the war following Britain's declaration. On August 12, the Berliner Journal, a local German-language weekly, implored Germans in Ontario: "Don't allow yourselves to be driven to demonstrations of any kind, avoid arguments ... Be silent, bear this difficult time with dignity, and show that you are true Germans grateful to the country that accommodated you." British policy allowed Germans across the Dominion four days to leave, while the German government encouraged the German diaspora to return. The 1911 census counted 393,320 people of German origin living across Canada. Because the war was being fought in Europe, Berlin residents expected the fighting to have little direct impact on their lives. German social clubs continued to meet and found their proceedings unaffected. Ministers holding religious services in German declared their loyalty to the Canadian war effort.

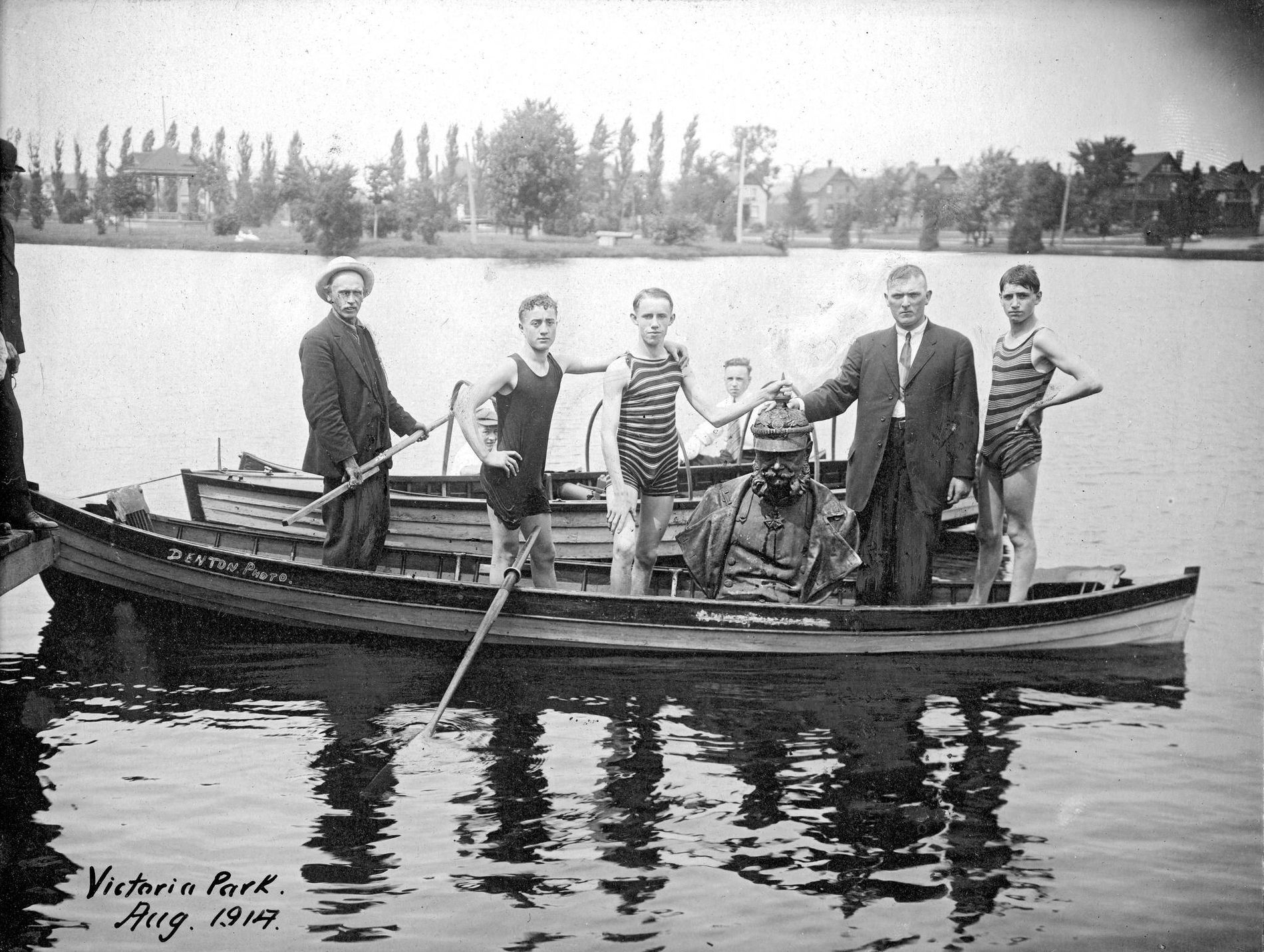
Berlin residents retrieving the bust of Kaiser Wilhelm from Victoria Park lake, August 1914. (Note: Both English & McLaughlin and McLaughlin, Stortz & Wahl write it was the morning of August 22, 1914. An August 26 report in the Berliner Journal places the act as Sunday, August 23 between 1 and 2 am.) Vandals threw the bust into the lake following Britain and Canada's declaration of war against Germany.

Three weeks after Canada's entry into the war, vandals toppled Victoria Park's bust of Kaiser Wilhelm and threw it into the park's lake. Residents retrieved the bust and apprehended the three youths responsible. (Note: Sources disagree on what happened to the bust. Most sources – Leibbrandt; English & McLaughlin; McLaughlin & Jaeger; and Wilson – write the bust was put into storage at the Concordia Club and then stolen by soldiers and paraded on King Street in February 1916. English & McLaughlin and Wilson further write that the bust was melted down and made into napkin holders and other souvenirs. Campbell writes the bust was restored in Victoria Park and was stolen in February 1916, never to be found again. Hayes writes the soldiers breaking into the Concordia Club on February 15, 1916 were looking for the bust but did not find it there. The findings of the court of inquiry reported that a bust of Kaiser Wilhelm I was stolen from the Concordia Club during the February 15 raid.) In the months following the outbreak of the war, Berlin's Board of Education voted to end the use of German in schools. Respected Berlin citizens, including businessman and politician Louis Jacob Breithaupt, held public meetings opposed to the decision. In his reply to the speech from the throne on August 19, 1914, Conservative MP Donald Sutherland expressed sympathy to the German people for "the dangers brought upon them by their ruling classes, by their oligarchic, insane, military government." The same day, Canadian Prime Minister Robert Borden stated that people born in Germany and Austria-Hungary and who came to Canada "as adopted citizens of this country, whether they are naturalized or not, are entitled to the protection of the law in Canada and shall receive it", adding that an exception would be made for those aiding and abetting the enemy.

In early 1915, Waterloo North MP William George Weichel expressed in Canada's House of Commons that German-speaking Canadians could be proud of their cultural heritage while remaining loyal to the Canadian war effort. The year before, Waterloo and Berlin, measured on a per capita basis, were first and second in Canada, respectively, in individual contributions to the Canadian Patriotic Fund. Of the 60 members of Waterloo's German social club, the Acadian Club, half enlisted in Canada's armed forces. The club hosted events supporting the Canadian Red Cross and the Patriotic Fund. Local Professor F. V. Riecthdorf proclaimed, "I am a native German and former soldier ... My loyalty is to the British flag ... let our response to the Empire be immediate and sufficient!" Trying to lessen signs of disloyalty, in May 1915 the Berlin City Council asked for the appointment of a local Registrar of Enemy Aliens, though this request was denied after being deemed unnecessary.

=== Increasing anti-German sentiment ===
The war led to condemnation of the German tradition in Canada and rising anti-German sentiments. Actions by the German Empire contributed to anti-German feelings, including the violation of Belgium's neutrality, their use of poison gas, the execution of Edith Cavell, the sinking of the RMS Lusitania, and an apocryphal story of German troops crucifying a Canadian soldier. In a March 1, 1916 letter to the Berlin News Record, the chair of the North Waterloo recruiting committee stated: "The fact remains that Berlin was named after the capital of Prussia and is to-day the capital of the German Empire, whence have emanated the most diabolical crimes and atrocities that have marred the pages of history." A fire at Parliament Hill in February 1916 was falsely assumed to have been set by German arsonists. Although many accounts of wartime atrocities were later shown to be fabrications and British propaganda, most Canadian citizens took them to be true.

The use of the German language or the display of German flags became seen as signs of Canadian disloyalty. Young men, many of them German, were harassed in the street if they had not signed up for military service. Newspapers in Toronto like The Globe and Toronto News made frequent attacks on German-Canadians. A Globe editorial warned that Berliners should be kept under observation, warning of espionage. To guard against the perceived threat of sabotage and attacks by German-Canadians, 16,000 Canadian soldiers were stationed in Canada; between October 1915 and September 1916, 50,000 Canadian Expeditionary Force volunteers were kept home to protect against any eventualities. Beginning in 1914, those Germans deemed a threat to national security were interned; the Canadian government held discretionary power to intern any civilian they considered either an "agent" or of potential service to an enemy power. In 1916, roughly 2,000 Germans were interned across Canada, totalling 2,009 by war's end. (Note: Of those interned, 1,192 were Germans who lived in Canada. The remaining 817 had no prior connection to Canada, being captured sailors and merchant seaman.) Though none were interned or jailed in Ontario, Germans across the province experienced a curtailing of their rights and freedoms. In a February 1916 diary entry, L. J. Breithaupt lamented, "Public sentiment in Canada is very anti-German & so to some extent against anything connected with or reminding one of Germany." Canadian military leaders also espoused anti-German sentiments. In an April 1916 letter to the Berlin News Record, Sergeant-Major Granville Blood warned Berliners: "Be British. Do your duty or be despised ... Be British or be dead." In a printed address to Canada, Lieutenant Stanley Nelson Dacey wrote:

You have creatures in your midst who say success to the Kaiser, and to hell with the King; all I can say is, round up this element into the detention camps, for they are unworthy of British citizenship and should be placed where they belong ... the showing that the physically fit young men of North Waterloo have made is so rotten that I have heard an outside businessman say to a traveller from a Berlin wholesale house, "I'll not buy another damned article manufactured in that German town. So you think I'm going to give money to support a pack of Germans? If I did, I'd be as bad as they."

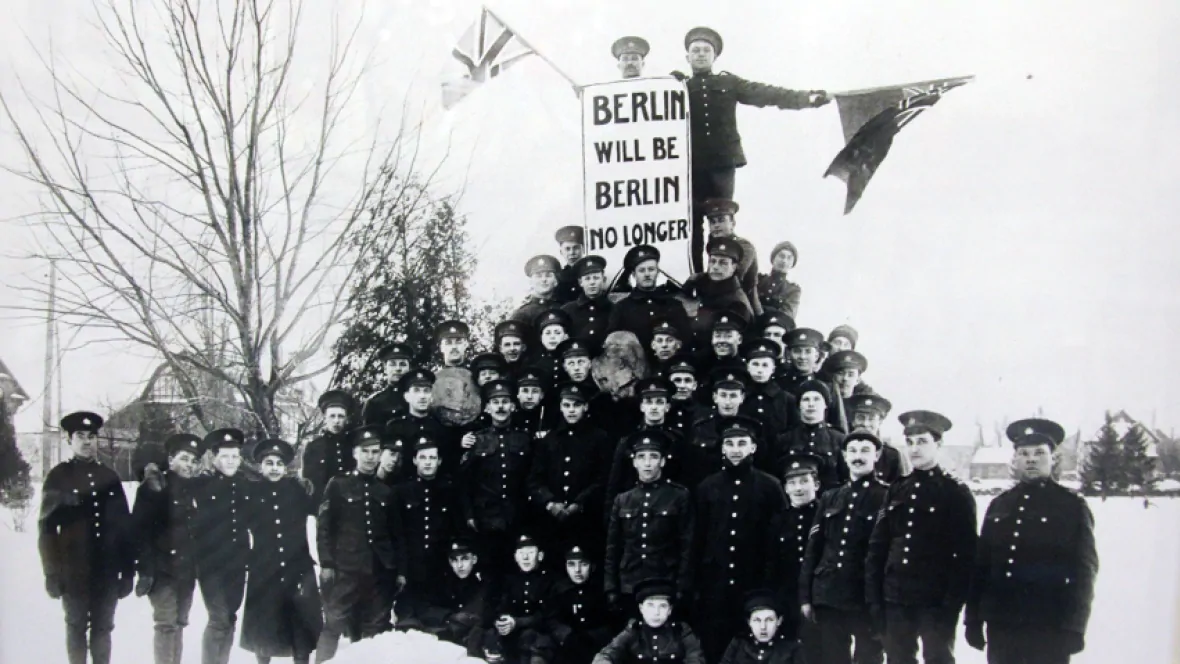
A day after raiding a local German social club, soldiers of the local 118th Battalion gather around the 1897 Peace Memorial in Victoria Park with a banner bearing the phrase "Berlin will be Berlin No Longer", February 16, 1916.

In January 1916, members of the local 118th Battalion campaigned for new recruits but – like most battalions in Canada – found little success. Recruiters resorted to harassing men in the streets who had not signed up for service and forcing them into the recruiting office. Berlin's local police force found it difficult to control the battalion. When Constable Blevins, a Berlin police officer, attempted to arrest soldier Joseph Meinzinger for harassing citizens, Meinzinger broke Blevins' jaw. On February 15, a group of Canadian soldiers from the Battalion broke into the Concordia Club, stole memorabilia and destroyed the interior. An inquiry from Camp Borden led to no charges and instead justified the raid.

In early 1916, Canada's Militia Minister, Sam Hughes, made a speech in the House of Commons attacking the Reverend C. R. Tappert, a Berlin Lutheran minister. Tappert became a controversial figure locally for several actions, including his continued use of German in religious services, telling his children to avoid saluting the Union Jack and to not sing "God Save the King", his refusal to contribute to the Patriotic Fund and his public doubting of anti-German propaganda. In an early 1915 letter to the Berlin News Record, he wrote that while he was loyal to Canada his heart remained German. Hughes accused Tappert of being a "[semi-apologist] for German atrocities and Kaiserism." Tappert ignored threats to leave the country by March 1; on March 4 or 5 a group of 60 soldiers broke into Tappert's parsonage and seized him. (Note: Both English & McLaughlin and Wilson write it was March 4, while Hayes writes it was March 5.) A witness recalled: "Within minutes, Tappert was being dragged behind horses through the streets, his face bloodied, his body twisting as he fell into unconsciousness while the pavement scraped off his flesh." Magistrate John J. A. Weir warned the two soldiers responsible – Private Schaefer and Sergeant-Major Granville Blood – that he remembered Schaefer being connected to the throwing of the Kaiser Wilhelm bust in the Victoria Park lake in 1914 and he knew Blood had further plans to attack other citizens. Both received suspended sentences of $100 fines (equivalent to CA$3,000 in 2025) and/or six months in prison for the assault. Hughes blamed Tappert for instigating them with his anti-British sentiments. Tappert and his family left Berlin on March 8.

== Organization of the referendum ==
The first suggestion of a name change appeared in a letter to the Berlin News Record on February 4, 1916. The author, identified only as "A Ratepayer", suggested the Berlin City Council adopt a resolution changing the name of the city. The initial impetus for changing the city name was borne out of monetary rather than patriotic interests. The start of war brought many contracts to the city's manufacturers, but business leaders worried the "made in Berlin" label on their products would hurt sales. On February 8, 1916, the Berlin Board of Trade proposed changing the city's name, hoping that doing so would serve to indicate the city's patriotism to the rest of the Dominion and thereby help local business. On February 11, the Berlin City Council resolved:

Whereas it would appear that a strong prejudice has been created throughout the British Empire against the name "Berlin" and all that the name implies,

And whereas, the citizens of this City full appreciate that this prejudice is but natural, it being absolutely impossible for any loyal citizen to consider it complimentary to be longer called after the Capital of Prussia,

Be it therefore and it is hereby resolved that the City Council be petitioned to take the necessary steps to have the name "Berlin" changed to some other name more in keeping with our National sentiment.

Most at the meeting endorsed the resolution with only one member voting against it. L. J. Breithaupt attended the meeting and spoke against the resolution, arguing that any name change would have no effect on British victory in the war and that any proposal of changing the city name should instead be put to a popular vote. In his diary he called the event, "an epoch making meeting". On February 21, organizers of the resolution brought a petition with 1,080 signatures to the city council calling for the name change. City council voted in favour of petitioning Ontario's Legislative Assembly to have the city's name changed and to possibly amalgamate with Waterloo. Businessmen and community leaders wrote letters to the Berlin News Record arguing for and against the name change. Many arguments turned toward ad hominem. At an early March meeting manufacturers and businessmen pushed for the name change. Those opposing the change were threatened with boycotts. The city council offered a reward for the most suitable replacement name and received thousands of suggestions by the end of March. On April 4, Berlin's delegation appeared before the Ontario's Legislative Assembly's Private Bills Committee. The committee voted to not report the bill to the Legislature out of fears that violence would break-out in Berlin as a result. Returning to Berlin unsuccessful, the delegation formed a British League "to promote British Sentiments in the community". On April 14, the league passed their own resolution imploring the city council to protest their treatment at Ontario's Legislative Assembly. The council passed the resolution, including in it an amendment that allowed them to hold a referendum over the issue. During an April 24 meeting, the council voted to hold a referendum on May 19.

Most Berliners expressed little interest in the campaign but those who did found it intense. Archivist Barbara Wilson states: "Many Berliners, including Mayor J. E. Hett, saw no real purpose in changing Berlin's name, but to oppose the change-the-name movement actively in February [1916] would have led to more charges of disloyalty and pro-Germanism." The Berlin Telegraph supported the name change while the Berlin News Record opposed. Both papers ran pieces and advertisements arguing their positions. Tensions continued to rise, culminating on May 5 when 30 soldiers entered and ransacked the Acadian Club in Waterloo. Canada's Minister of Justice, Charles Doherty, refused to reimburse the club for the damages, explaining that doing so would engender further racial disharmony. William Breithaupt, head of Berlin's library board and the president of the Waterloo Historical Society, was outspoken in his opposition to the name change. Throughout the campaign he received threatening letters and found the phone lines to his house cut.

== Voting and results ==
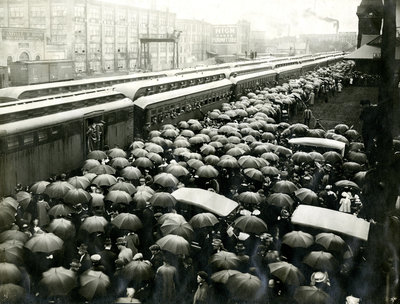
Three days after the referendum, residents see members of the 118th Battalion off at the Berlin station, May 22, 1916. The soldiers' absence reduced tensions in the city.

=== May 1916 referendum ===
On May 19, 1916, the referendum was held in Berlin asking voters: "Are you in favour of changing the name of this city?" Historian Adam Crerar writes that much of the voting was characterized by intimidation. Soldiers of the 118th kept potential name change opponents away from the polls, while name change proponents challenged unnaturalized citizens. Many of those disenfranchised had voted in previous elections and had sent sons to fight for Canada in the war.

Of 3,057 votes cast, "yes" won by 81 votes. English & McLaughlin write that women and soldiers were generally "yes" voters, while the working class and residents of the especially German North Ward generally voted "no". (Note: In The Globe and Mail, John Allemang writes that only male ratepayers were eligible to vote, but English & McLaughlin write that women voted in the referendum.) The result of the vote prompted supporters to celebrate in the streets. A report in the Berlin News Record recounted fireworks being set off into the air and the sidewalks, ultimately injuring many celebrants. Alderman J. A. Hallman sent a telegram to King George V informing him, "The loyal citizens of Berlin Canada rejoice to inform Your Majesty that they have this day cast off forever the name of the Prussian capital." The Duke of Connaught informed Hallman on May 23 that the King had received his telegram. A regimental band and crowd walked through Berlin and gathered in front of August Lang's home, a major opponent of the name change. Lang confronted the crowd and an altercation ensued. Colonel Lochead of the 118th Battalion found no fault on the part of his soldiers. On May 22, a week after the initial referendum, the 707 soldiers in the 118th Battalion left for London, Ontario, to continue training, alleviating much on the tension in the community.

=== June 1916 name selection ===
A civic committee of 99 members was assembled to produce name recommendations. The committee narrowed thousands of suggestions to a shortlist of Huronto, Bercana, Dunard, Hydro City, Renoma and Agnoleo. (Note: "Bercana" being a portmanteau of "Berlin" and "Canada". D. B. Detweiler, a local promoter of hydroelectricity, suggested "Hydro City".) A report in the Berlin News Record wrote that the names became "the joke of the country". On June 1, the Berlin City Council thanked the committee and decided to assemble its own list, offering cash prizes for winning suggestions. On June 5, Britain's Secretary of State for War, Horatio Herbert Kitchener, drowned aboard HMS Hampshire after it struck a mine while en route to Russia. News of his drowning was widely reported the following day. The Berlin News Record published a letter in its June 7 edition from local resident Elsie Master, who suggested "Kitchener" as a better alternative to "Berlin", writing it would evoke "splendid patriotism, tremendous energy, great attainments, and a sense of unswerving honour and rectitude". The city council added Kitchener to their revised shortlist of names, the name being particularly popular among local businessmen, though some felt it to be in poor taste. An editorial in Stratford, Ontario's Herald complained: "No name of a martyr of this war should be allowed to be appropriated where the motive is largely commercial."

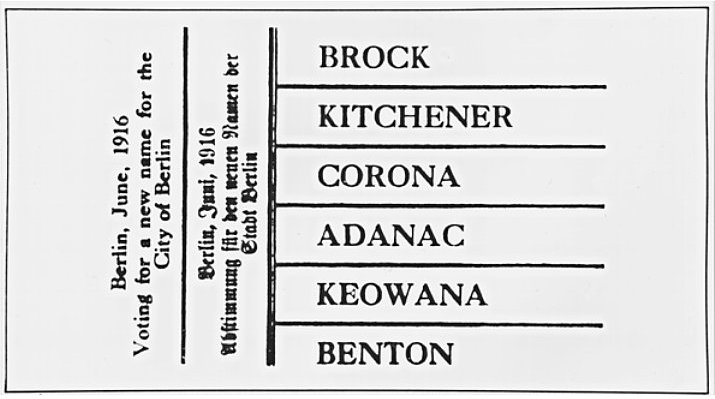
A ballot for selecting the new city name, June 1916

The final choices for the vote were narrowed to Brock, Kitchener, Corona, Adanac, Keowana and Benton. (Note: "Adanac" being "Canada" spelled backwards, and "Brock" referring to Isaac Brock, a British Army officer from the War of 1812.) Some residents suggested that Berlin be renamed Waterloo and the cities merge. A resolution pushing for this failed in Berlin's City Council on June 20. From June 24 to 28, 1916, (Note: Wilson writes the vote was conducted "between June 25 and 28," while McKegney writes it was "from June 24 to 28." Hayes does not mention the duration of the vote but says it began on June 24.) between 9:00 am and 9:00 pm each day, a second vote was held to determine a new city name. Turnout was low, with only 892 votes cast out of a possible 4,897. (Note: Both Hayes and Wilson write there were a total of 892 valid and 163 invalid ballots, giving a total of 1,055. However, Wilson provides a tally for each choice and when added together they actually sum to 729 valid votes. When 729 is added to the 163 invalid votes, this totals to 892.) Of those, 163 spoiled their ballots, many crossing out all the options and writing in either Berlin or Waterloo. Kitchener won with 346 votes, besting Brock by eleven votes.

| Choice | Votes | % |
|---|---|---|
| Kitchener | 346 | 38.79 |
| Brock | 335 | 37.56 |
| Adanac | 23 | 2.58 |
| Benton | 15 | 1.68 |
| Corona | 7 | 0.78 |
| Keowana | 3 | 0.34 |
| Invalid/blank votes | 163 | 18.27 |
| Total | 892 | 100 |
| Registered voters/turnout | 4,897 | 18.22 |

== Reaction and aftermath ==
=== Immediate ===
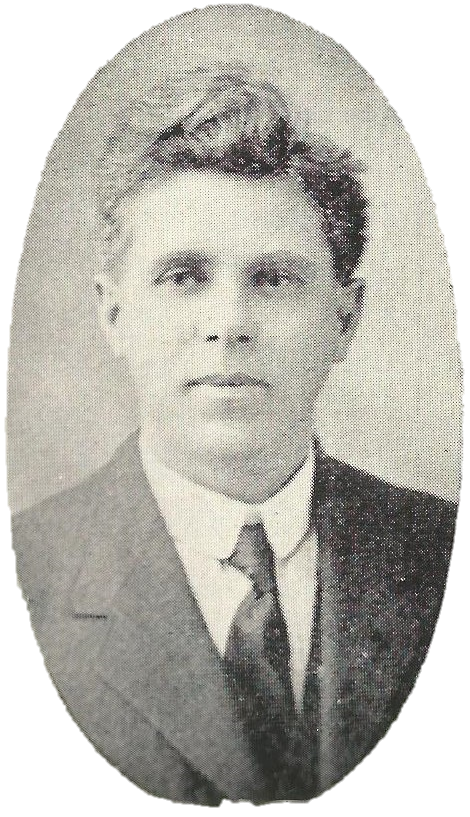
In an effort to defuse tensions, Kitchener mayor David Gross pledged in his January 1917 inaugural address that he would not change Kitchener's name back.

Wilson writes that the reaction to the June vote result was "dead silence". Regarding the low voter turnout, the Berlin News Record commented: "The outstanding feature was the absolute indifference displayed by the ratepayers." On July 4, 1916, the Berlin City Council approved the vote, setting September 1, 1916 as when the city would officially become Kitchener. On July 11, the city council endorsed a petition by the newly formed Citizens' League, garnering 2,068 signatures opposing the name change. A delegation took the petition on to Ontario's Legislative Assembly. The provincial government refused to stop the change seeing the vote as having been entirely orderly. On August 23, the Ontario government passed an order recognizing the change as coming into effect on September 1.

On September 1, 1916, Berlin officially became Kitchener. English & McLaughlin write that Berlin's name change failed to quell outside suspicions about the loyalty of the German population. Those who opposed the name change were harassed for their defiance. Letter writers continued to address their mail to Berlin, forcing the Post Office to issue memoranda, while municipalities in Ontario petitioned the government to force those who refused to reference the city as Kitchener. In the lead-up to Kitchener's January 1, 1917 municipal election, members of the British League sought to expel "aliens" off the voters' list. Every candidate elected to the city council had previously been against the name change. When the results were announced, the British League, citizens and soldiers of the 118th Battalion gathered outside the Berlin News Record office, as well as mayor-elect David Gross's home and button factory. Soldiers smashed windows and destroyed the interiors of both buildings. In an effort to defuse tensions, Gross pledged in his inaugural address that he would not try to change Kitchener's name back to Berlin.

The last major attempt to change the name of Kitchener back to Berlin came during a December 2, 1919 city council meeting. A finance committee report recommended another vote be held regarding the city's name. A crowd of 500, mostly members of the Great War Veterans' Association, made their way into the council room to show their opposition to the resolution. The council voted the resolution down but protestors assaulted two aldermen who abstained from the vote, forcing them to kiss the Union Jack and throwing one in the Victoria Park lake.

=== 1917 federal election ===
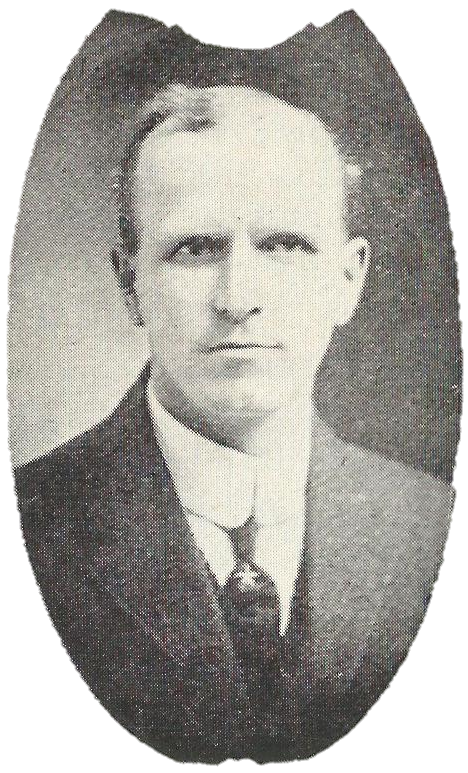
The election of anti-conscription candidate William Daum Euler in Waterloo North reinforced outside perceptions that Kitchener and Waterloo remained loyal to Germany.

On November 24, 1917, Prime Minister Robert Borden visited Kitchener to generate support for his Military Service Act and to campaign for his Unionist Party in the upcoming federal election. Two months earlier, his government passed the Wartime Elections Act which, among other things, disenfranchised voters expected to be opposed to conscription. The disenfranchisement included Germans who received their citizenship after 31 March 1902. At the November event, a group of disgruntled citizens heckled Borden, an incident which received national press coverage. Local manufacturers and businessmen subsequently urged Kitchener City Council to apologize to the prime minister to prevent further lost business, but the city council refused to apologize by a vote of seven to five. Newspapers in other Ontario cities – including Kingston, Guelph and Brantford – pointed to the refusal as evidence that, though Kitchener had changed its name, the residents remained loyal to Germany over Canada. In his memoirs, Borden reflected that, for the rest of Canada, "the Kitchener incident was much more effective than any speech I could have delivered." Following the refusal, the Board of Trade and the Kitchener Manufacturers' Association protested the action by organizing a factory shutdown scheduled for December 3. On the day of the protest, city council voted to apologize to stop a prolonged shutdown.

During the election campaign, newspapers across Ontario generally sided with the Union government and their pro-conscription stance. Kitchener and Waterloo were similar, where in the final three and a half weeks of the election campaign the Berlin News Record and the Berlin Telegraph did not publish or report on any campaign material from the Liberals, forcing Liberal challenger William Daum Euler to print his own paper, the Voice of the People. Union campaign posters argued, "Who would the Kaiser vote for?" In the vote, the incumbent Unionist Weichel lost his Waterloo North seat to Euler, a major opponent of conscription. Carried by the German vote, Euler won by a twenty-point margin, the largest majority of any of Ontario's Liberals. Illustrating the divide, he took 63.1 per cent of the civilian vote but only 4.6 per cent of the soldier vote. The defeated Weichel lamented, "you cannot beat the Kaiser in North Waterloo." German animus for the Union Government and the Conservative Party persisted for generations, while Euler's win reinforced outside perceptions that the residents of Kitchener and Waterloo remained loyal to Germany despite the name change.

== Legacy ==
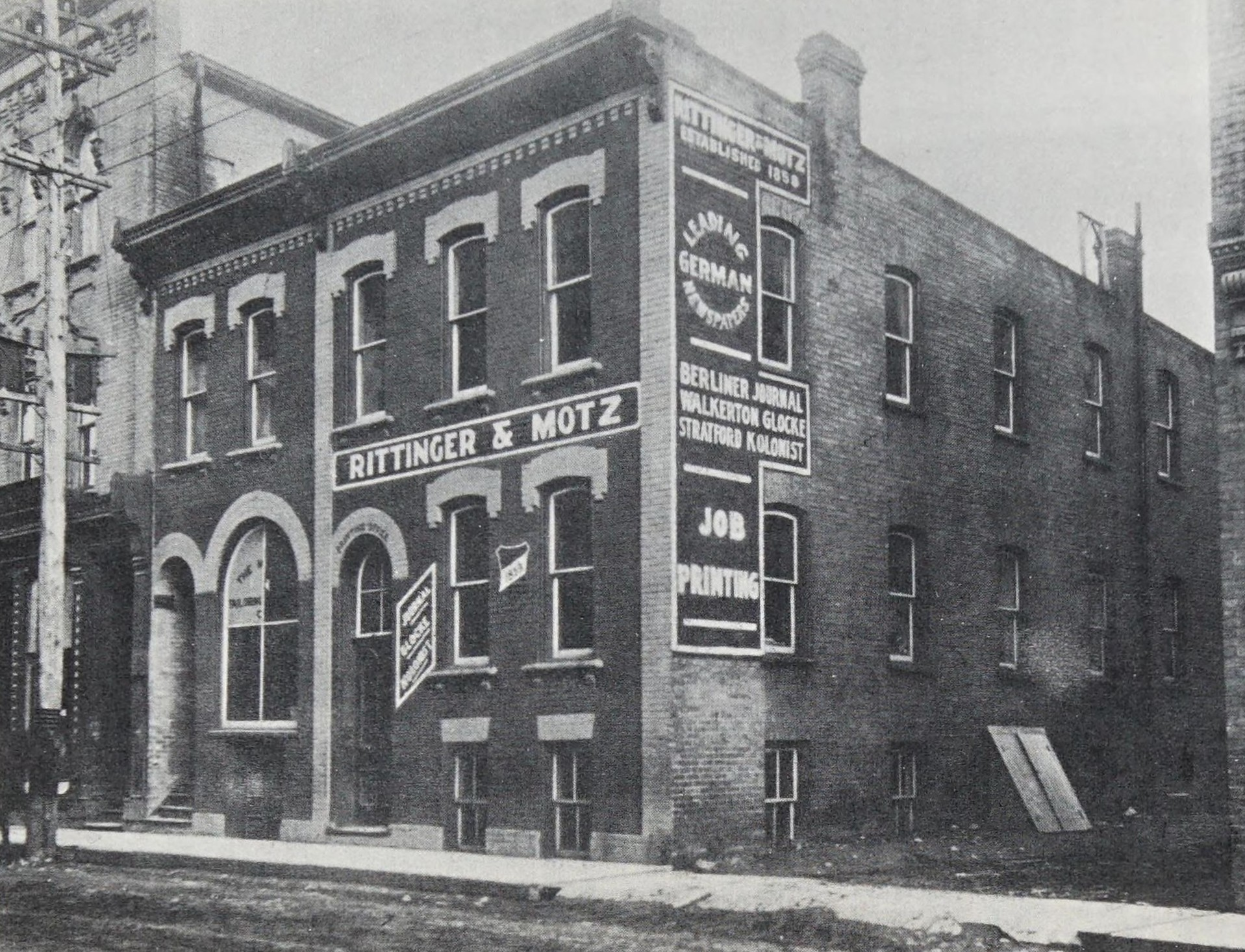
Ontario's last German-language newspaper, the Berliner Journal (printing office pictured, c. 1908), closed in 1918 because the federal government forbade German-language publications.

In the years during and immediately following the First World War, numerous towns in Canada, the US and Australia changed the names of places associated with Germany, though the levels of public unrest displayed during the Berlin-Kitchener name change distinguishes it from other contemporary name change examples. The historian David Blackbourn describes the First World War as a caesura for people of German descent in the Anglo-Saxon world, marking a general decline in German culture: "When the heavily German city of Berlin, Ontario, became Kitchener, and Berlin, Iowa, became Lincoln, these were instances of something repeated thousands of times across the German-speaking parts of the English speaking world. Little Germanys retreated sharply." In the final months of the war, the Canadian Government passed an Order in Council requiring all Canadian newspapers in "languages of the enemy" to be published in either English or French. Ontario's last German-language newspaper, the Berliner Journal, ran its last issue in December 1918. The government repealed the order in January 1920, but it was not until 1967 that another German-language newspaper appeared in Kitchener.

Anti-German sentiments persisted in the immediate aftermath of the war. Many German-Canadians anglicized their names – changing Braun to Brown and Schmidt to Smith, for example – and instead referred to their heritage as Dutch or Austrian. A 1919 Order in Council forbade German immigrants to enter Canada, a restriction held in place until 1923. In the decades that followed, the German population of Kitchener decreased continuously. The 1911 census listed 76 per cent of people in the community as being of German origin, dropping to 55.6 and 53 per cent in 1921 and 1931 censuses, respectively. Though the city had attracted large numbers of German immigrants in the previous century, when the restrictions on immigration were lifted in 1923 most newcomers instead settled in western Canada where resource industries were plentiful and land was inexpensive.

In the early 1930s, Kitchener and Waterloo largely rejected local fascist movements inspired by Germany's rising Nazi Party. When Canada and Britain again found themselves at war against Germany during the Second World War, community leaders were sensitive to charges of disloyalty and acted quickly to assuage outside doubts; the Concordia Club and other German social clubs shut down in August 1939. Kitchener experienced little of the anti-German sentiment seen during the First World War. During the war, seven Kitchener residents were interned as enemy aliens. This was a lower number than that of surrounding communities, a fact the Daily Record reported proudly. Historian William Campbell credits the lack of anti-German sentiment to a broadening of the Canadian identity following the First World War, extending beyond the dominant English and French cultures. English & McLaughlin point to the automobile and new forms of mass media – such as movies, the radio and magazines – as expanding culture in Kitchener and bringing it more in alignment with Canada and North America as a whole. Most scholars agree that in the decades following the war Germans in Canada were assimilated.

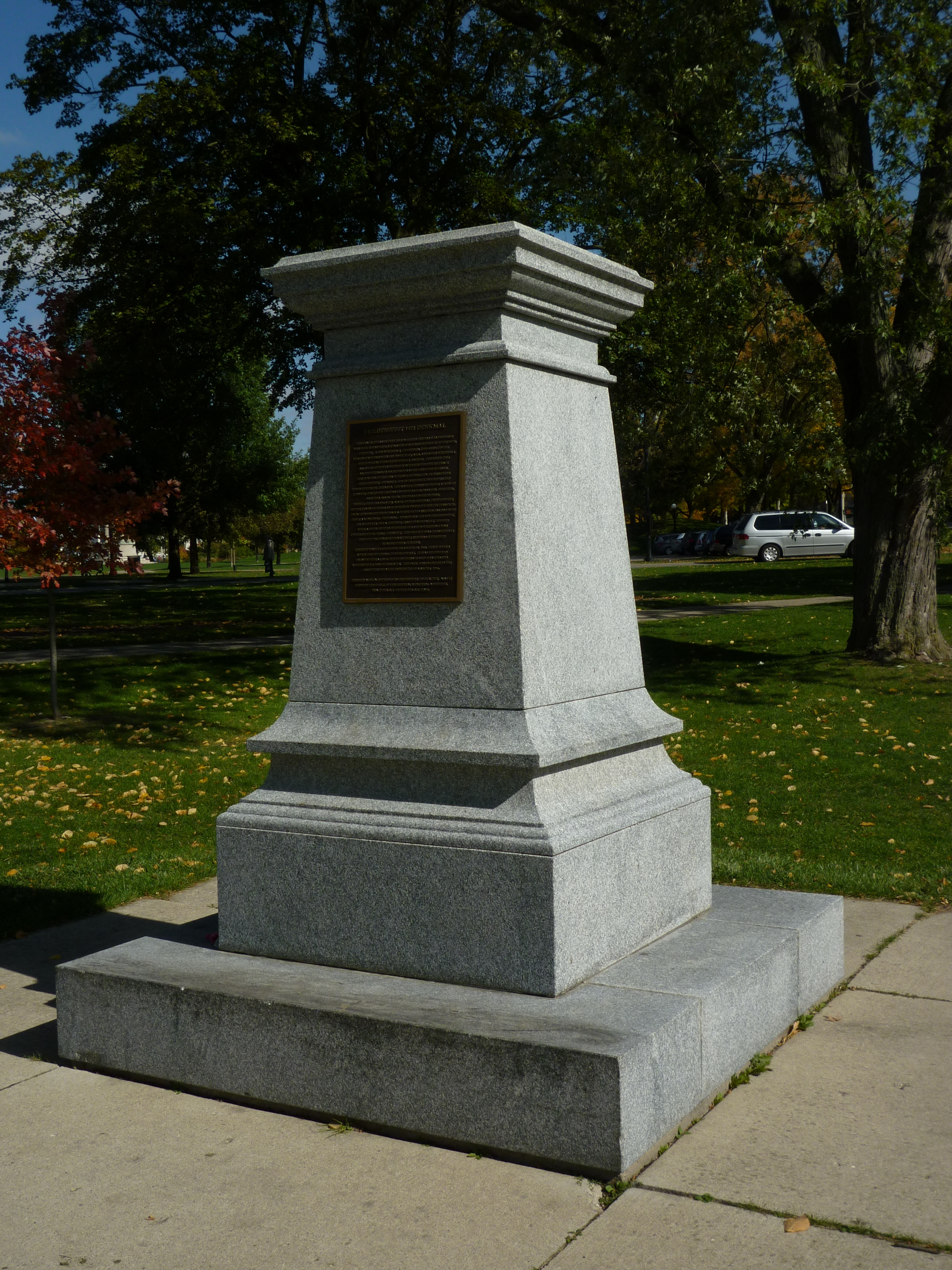
In 1996, Kitchener erected a replica of the 1897 Peace Monument in Victoria Park (pictured 2012), though it omitted the bust of Kaiser Wilhelm I.

Through the second half of the 20th century, Greeks, Portuguese, Indian, West Indian and Chinese ethnic groups dominated immigration to the community, 25 per cent of residents considering themselves of German origin in the 2001 census. After English, German was the second-most spoken language in Waterloo Region until 2016, when it was surpassed by Mandarin. In the aftermath of the First World War, the community shifted to emphasizing the Pennsylvania Dutch and Mennonite communities that first settled in the area, illustrated in Mabel Dunham's 1924 work of historical fiction, The Trail of the Conestoga, and in the 1926 dedication of the Waterloo Pioneer Memorial Tower. Overt celebrations of the city's European German tradition returned in the late 1960s and early 1970s; the Kitchener–Waterloo Oktoberfest attracts hundreds of thousands of participants annually, making it the largest Oktoberfest celebrated in North America, though English & McLaughlin comment the event is more a celebration of drinking than of German culture. In 1992, author William Chadwick examined the name change in a work of popular history, published as The Battle for Berlin, Ontario: An Historical Drama. He produced a play from the book, The Berlin Show, staged for Waterloo audiences in the summer of 1994. In the 21st century, Horatio Herbert Kitchener's role in establishing concentration camps during the Second Boer War has made his legacy unsavoury to some Kitchener residents. In 2020, a 380-signature petition calling for another name change prompted the Kitchener City Council to respond: "While we in no way condone, diminish or forget his actions ... Kitchener has become so much more than its historic connection to a British field marshal."

== See also ==
- List of Australian place names changed from German names

== Sources ==
=== Books ===
- Bausenhart, Werner (1989). German Immigration and Assimilation in Ontario, 1783–1918. New York: Legas. ISBN 0-921252-10-2.
- Betcherman, Lita-Rose (1975). The Swastika and the Maple Leaf: Fascist Movements in Canada in the Thirties. Toronto: Fitzhenry & Whiteside. ISBN 0-88902-022-1.
- Bloomfield, Elizabeth (1995). Waterloo Township Through Two Centuries. Kitchener: Waterloo Historical Society. ISBN 0-9699719-0-7.
- Borden, Robert (1938). Borden, Henry (ed.). Robert Laird Borden: His Memoirs. Vol. 2. Toronto: Macmillan Company of Canada Ltd. OCLC 2699108.
- Clark, Christopher (2013). The Sleepwalkers: How Europe Went to War in 1914. New York: HarperCollins. ISBN 978-0-06-114665-7.
- Dutil, Patrice; MacKenzie, David (2017). Embattled Nation: Canada's Wartime Election of 1917. Toronto: Dundurn Press. ISBN 978-1-4597-3726-6.
- English, John; McLaughlin, Kenneth (1983). Kitchener: An Illustrated History. Waterloo: Wilfrid Laurier University Press. ISBN 0-88920-137-4.
- Hayes, Geoffrey (1997). Waterloo County: An Illustrated History. Kitchener: Waterloo Historical Society. ISBN 0-9699719-1-5.
- Leibbrandt, Gottlieb (1980). Little Paradise, The Saga of the German Canadians of Waterloo County, Ontario 1800–1975. Translated by Weissenborn, G. K. Kitchener: Allprint Co. ISBN 0-919207-01-4.
- Lorenzkowski, Barbara (2010). Sounds of Ethnicity: Listening to German North America, 1850–1914. Winnipeg: University of Manitoba Press. ISBN 978-0-88755-188-8.
- McKegney, Patricia P. (1991). The Kaiser's Bust: A Study of War-Time Propaganda in Berlin, Ontario, 1914–1918. Wellesley: University of Bamberg Press. ISBN 0-9695356-0-0.
- McLaughlin, Kenneth (1985). The Germans in Canada. Ottawa: Canadian Historical Association. ISBN 978-0-88798-112-8.
- McLaughlin, Kenneth; Stortz, Gerald J.; Wahl, James A. (2002). Enthusiasm for the Truth: An Illustrated History of St. Jerome's University. Waterloo: St. Jerome's University. ISBN 0-9731213-0-0.
- McLaughlin, Kenneth; Jaeger, Sharon (2007). Waterloo: An Illustrated History, 1857–2007. Waterloo: City of Waterloo. ISBN 978-0-9691175-1-3.
- Semchuk, Sandra (2019). The Stories Were Not Told: Canada's First World War Internment Camps. Edmonton: The University of Alberta Press. ISBN 978-1-77212-378-4.
- Uttley, William V. (1975) [1937]. A History of Kitchener, Ontario. Waterloo: Wilfrid Laurier University Press. ISBN 0-88920-024-6.
- Wilson, Barbara M., ed. (1977b). Ontario and the First World War 1914–1918. Toronto: University of Toronto Press. ISBN 0-8020-2255-3. ISSN 0078-5091.

=== Book chapters ===
- Avery, Donald (2005). "Ethnic and Class Relations in Western Canada during the First World War: A Case Study of European Immigrants and Anglo-Canadian Nativism". In MacKenzie, David (ed.). Canada and the First World War: Essays in Honour of Robert Craig Brown. Toronto: University of Toronto Press. pp. 272–299. ISBN 0-8020-8445-1.
- Copp, Terry (2005). "The Military Effort, 1914–1918". In MacKenzie, David (ed.). Canada and the First World War: Essays in Honour of Robert Craig Brown. Toronto: University of Toronto Press. pp. 35–61. ISBN 0-8020-8445-1.
- Crerar, Adam (2005). "Ontario and the Great War". In MacKenzie, David (ed.). Canada and the First World War: Essays in Honour of Robert Craig Brown. Toronto: University of Toronto Press. pp. 230–271. ISBN 0-8020-8445-1.
- English, John (2005). "Political Leadership in the First World War". In MacKenzie, David (ed.). Canada and the First World War: Essays in Honour of Robert Craig Brown. Toronto: University of Toronto Press. pp. 76–95. ISBN 0-8020-8445-1.
- Frisse, Ulrich (2005). "Berlin/Kitchener, Ontario". In Adam, Thomas (ed.). Germany and the Americas: Culture, Politics, and History. Vol. 1. Santa Barbara: ABC-CLIO. pp. 138–142. ISBN 1-85109-633-7.
- Granatstein, J. L. (2005). "Conscription in the Great War". In MacKenzie, David (ed.). Canada and the First World War: Essays in Honour of Robert Craig Brown. Toronto: University of Toronto Press. pp. 62–75. ISBN 0-8020-8445-1.
- Löchte, Anne (2008). ""We dont want Kiser to rool in Ontario": Franco-Prussian War, German unification, and World War I as reflected in the Canadian Berliner Journal (1859–1918)". In Schulze, Mathias; Skidmore, James M.; John, David G.; Liebscher, Grit; Siebel-Achenbach, Sebastian (eds.). German Diasporic Experiences: Identity, Migration, and Loss. Waterloo: Wilfrid Laurier University Press. pp. 107–116. ISBN 978-1-55458-027-9.
- McLaughlin, Kenneth (1991). "Waterloo County: A Pennsylvania-German Homeland". In Burke, Susan M.; Hill, Matthew H. (eds.). From Pennsylvania to Waterloo: Pennsylvania-German Folk Culture in Transition. Kitchener: Joseph Schneider Haus. pp. 35–45. ISBN 0-9695578-0-9.
- Wilson, Barbara M. (1977a). "Introduction". In Wilson, Barbara M. (ed.). Ontario and the First World War 1914–1918. Toronto: University of Toronto Press. pp. xvii–cxix. ISBN 0-8020-2255-3. ISSN 0078-5091.

=== Journal articles ===
- Blackbourn, David (2015). "Germans Abroad and "Auslandsdeutsche": Places, Networks and Experiences from the Sixteenth to the Twentieth Century". Geschichte und Gesellschaft. 41 (2): 321–346. doi:10.13109/gege.2015.41.2.321. ISSN 0340-613X. JSTOR 24636718.
- Campbell, William J. (16 April 2015). "'We Germans ... are British Subjects': The First World War and the Curious Case of Berlin, Ontario, Canada". Canadian Military History. 21 (2): 45–57. ISSN 1195-8472. Archived from the original on 3 May 2021.
- Coschi, Mario Nathan (2014). "'Be British or be d–d': Primary Education in Berlin-Kitchener, Ontario, during the First World War". Histoire Sociale/Social History. 47 (94): 311–332. doi:10.1353/his.2014.0033. eISSN 1918-6576. S2CID 144865420.
- Hayes, Geoffrey (Spring 1995). "Review of The Battle for Berlin, Ontario: An Historical Drama by W. R. Chadwick". Labour/Le Travail. 35: 341–342. doi:10.2307/25143936. ISSN 0700-3862. JSTOR 25143936.
- Hayes, Geoffrey (Autumn 1999). "From Berlin to the Trek of the Conestoga: A Revisionist Approach to Waterloo County's German Identity" (PDF). Ontario History. 91 (2): 131–150. ISSN 0030-2953. Archived (PDF) from the original on 17 July 2020.
- Heick, W. H. (June 1980). "'If We Lose the War, Nothing Else Matters': The 1917 Federal Election in North Waterloo". Ontario History. 72 (2). ISSN 0030-2953.
- Lawson, Robert (December 2007). "Joachim von Ribbentrop in Canada, 1910–1914: A Note". The International History Review. 29 (4): 821–832. doi:10.1080/07075332.2007.9641142. ISSN 0707-5332. JSTOR 40110928. S2CID 159731198.
- Magee, Gayle (2016). ""She's a Dear Old Lady": English Canadian Popular Songs from World War I". American Music. 34 (4): 474–506. doi:10.5406/americanmusic.34.4.0474. ISSN 0734-4392. JSTOR 10.5406/americanmusic.34.4.0474. S2CID 165117751.
- Post, Chris W; Alderman, Derek H (2014). "'Wiping New Berlin off the map': political economy and the de-Germanisation of the toponymic landscape in First World War USA". Area. 46 (1): 83–91. Bibcode:2014Area...46...83P. doi:10.1111/area.12075. ISSN 0004-0894. JSTOR 24029946.
- Price, Peter (2016). "Of Solemn Pacts and Paper Scraps: International Law and the Purpose of War, 1914–1918". International Journal. 71 (1): 5–19. doi:10.1177/0020702016632122. ISSN 0020-7020. JSTOR 44631164. S2CID 147168560.
