= SPSL =

SPSL may refer to:

- Society for the Protection of Science and Learning, now Council for At-Risk Academics
- Society for the Philosophy of Sex and Love
- South Puget Sound League, school sports league in Washington state, United States
- Supplemental paid sick leave
