= Lucy Newlyn =

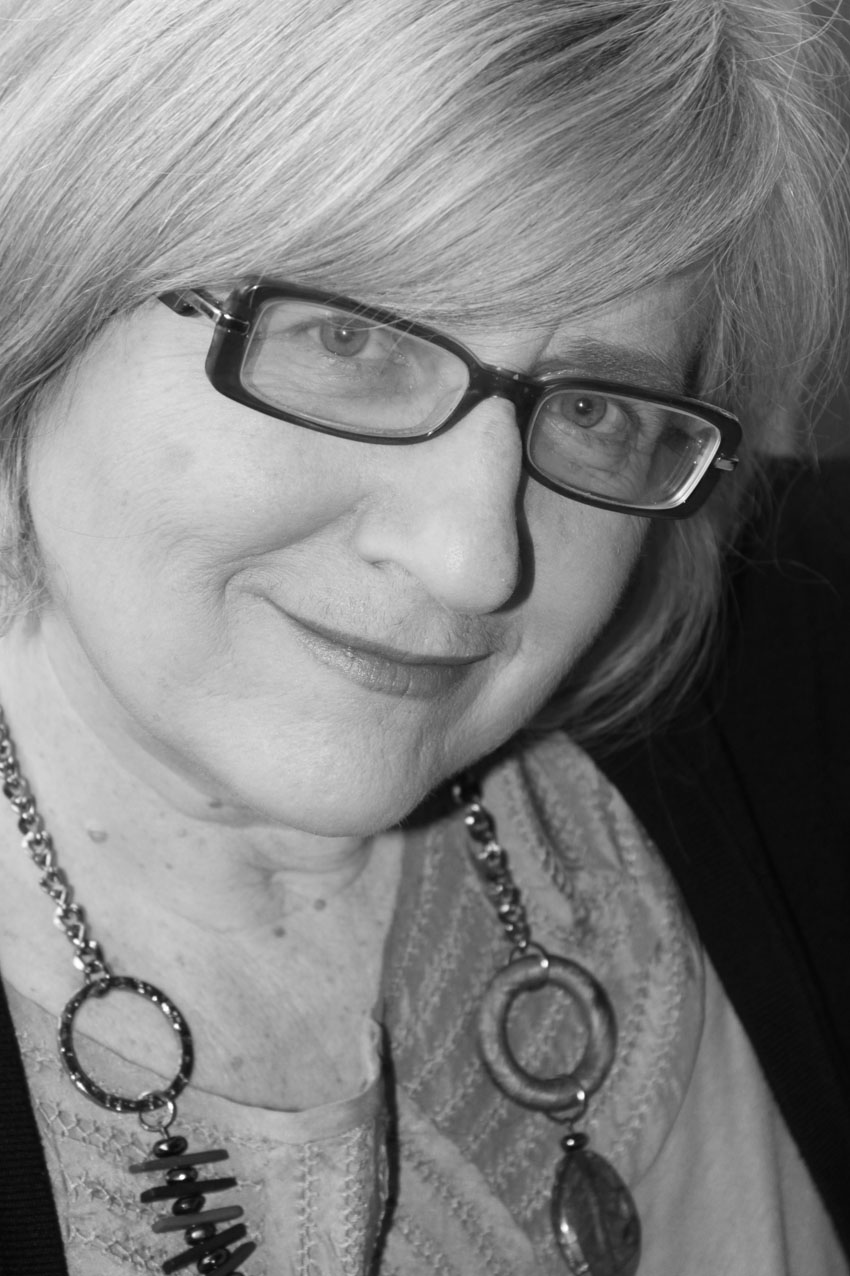
- Lucy Newlyn
- Born: 1956 (age 69–70)
- Education: Lawnswood High School
- Alma mater: Lady Margaret Hall, Oxford University
- Occupations: Literary critic, poet, professor at Oxford University
- Writing career
- Subjects: Poetry, Romanticism, Reception theory, Intertextuality

Lucy Newlyn (born 1956) is a poet and academic. She is an Emeritus Fellow in English at St Edmund Hall, Oxford, having retired as a professor of English Language and Literature at the University of Oxford in 2016.

Newlyn is a specialist in eighteenth- and early nineteenth-century poetry.

== Early life and education ==
Lucy Newlyn was born in 1956 in Kampala, Uganda. She grew up in Leeds, where she attended Lawnswood High School, winning an open scholarship to read English at Lady Margaret Hall, Oxford, in 1974. She took up her Oxford place in 1975 and graduated in 1978. Her D.Phil. thesis, supervised by Dr Roy Park, was later published as an Oxford English Monograph by Oxford University Press.

== Career ==
In 1984 Newlyn took up a Stipendiary Lectureship at St Edmund Hall. Two years later, she was elected as the A.C. Cooper Fellow and Tutor in English there – a permanent post which she held in conjunction with a CUF Lecturership in the Oxford English Faculty. Newlyn gained the title Professor of English Language and Literature in 2005. She was literary editor of The Oxford Magazine from 2011 to 2018. Together with Stuart Estell she co-founded the Hall Writers' Forum, an online resource launched in 2013 for the exchange of writing and discussion of literature and the arts. In 2015, she led the campaign to elect Wole Soyinka as Oxford Professor of Poetry.

== Work ==
Lucy Newlyn's longstanding research interests are eighteenth- and early nineteenth-century literature, especially poetry and non-fictional prose in the Romantic period. She is an authority on Wordsworth and Coleridge, has published four books with Oxford University Press and also edited the Cambridge Companion to Coleridge. Her book Reading, Writing, and Romanticism: The Anxiety of Reception won a Rose Mary Crawshay prize from the British Academy in 2001: 'a signal contribution to British Romantic studies and literary theory'.

Newlyn's scholarly work on Edward Thomas began with an edition of his book Oxford in 2005. This was followed by several articles on Thomas, as well as Branch-Lines: Edward Thomas and Contemporary Poetry, co-edited with Guy Cuthbertson. She is general co-editor of Edward Thomas, Selected Prose Writings, a six-volume edition for Oxford University Press. Together, she and Cuthbertson edited England and Wales.

Newlyn's book William and Dorothy Wordsworth: All in Each Other (2013), brought together many of her research interests.

== Poetry ==
Newlyn is a published poet and anthologist, as well as an academic. Her first collection, Ginnel (Oxford Poets/Carcanet, 2005) explores her ‘intense local attachment’ to the streets and alleys of Headingley in Leeds, where she grew up. Earth's Almanac (Enitharmon Press, 2015) concerns a fifteen-year period of grieving after the death of her older sister. In 2019, her collection of 135 sonnets about the Wordsworths, Vital Stream, was published by Carcanet in association with the Wordsworth Trust. The Marriage Hearse, which explores the impact of infertility on an imaginary Edwardian couple, was published by Maytree Press in 2020. In 2021, Newlyn published The Craft of Poetry: A Primer in Verse, a handbook on how to write poetry, written as poetry, and in 2022, her collection Quicksilver was published by Lapwing Publications in Belfast.

== Memoir and Fiction ==
Newlyn's personal experience of bipolar disorder is described in her fifteen-year memoir, Diary of a Bipolar Explorer. The book combines poetry with prose, and seeks to de-stigmatise mental illness. Her experimental novel, The Forum, concerns a group of people helping each other to cope with bipolar symptoms.

== Personal life ==
Married to economist Martin Slater, Lucy Newlyn has two step children and one daughter.

== Selected publications ==
- Newlyn, Lucy; Gravil, Richard; Roe, Nicholas, eds. (1985). Coleridge's Imagination: Essays in Memory of Pete Laver. Cambridge: Cambridge University Press. ISBN 9780521033992.
- Newlyn, Lucy (1986). Coleridge, Wordsworth, and the Language of Allusion = registration (2001 paperback ed.). Oxford: Oxford University Press. ISBN 9780199242597.
- Newlyn, Lucy (1993). "Paradise Lost" and the Romantic Reader (2001 paperback ed.). Oxford: Oxford University Press. ISBN 9780199242580.
- Newlyn, Lucy (2000). Reading, Writing, and Romanticism: The Anxiety of Reception. Winner of the British Academy's Rose Mary Crawshay prize, 2001 (2003 paperback ed.). Oxford: Oxford University Press. ISBN 9780198187110.
- Newlyn, Lucy = registration, ed. (2002). The Cambridge Companion to Coleridge. Cambridge: Cambridge University Press. ISBN 9780521659093.
- Newlyn, Lucy; Lewis, Jenny, eds. (2002). Synergies: Creative Writing in Academic Practice. Vol. 1. Oxford: Holywell Press. ISBN 9780954508401.
- Newlyn, Lucy; Lewis, Jenny, eds. (2004). Synergies: Creative Writing in Academic Practice. Vol. 2. Oxford: Holywell Press. ISBN 9780954508401.
- Newlyn, Lucy (2005). Ginnel. Oxford Poets. Carcanet. ISBN 9781903039748.
- Newlyn, Lucy, ed. (2005). Edward Thomas: Oxford. Signal Books. ISBN 1902669851.
- Newlyn, Lucy; Cuthbertson, Guy, eds. (2007). Branch-Lines: Edward Thomas and Contemporary Poetry. Enitharmon. ISBN 9781904634355.
- Newlyn, Lucy; Cuthbertson, Guy, eds. (2011). Edward Thomas: Prose Writings: A Selected Edition, England and Wales. Vol. 2. Oxford: Oxford University Press. ISBN 9780199558261.
- Newlyn, Lucy (2013). William and Dorothy Wordsworth: 'All in Each Other'. Oxford: Oxford University Press. ISBN 9780199696390.
- Newlyn, Lucy (2015). Earth's Almanac. Enitharmon. ISBN 9781910392102.
- Newlyn, Lucy (9 July 2015). "Selecting Oxford's professor of poetry should not be trial by media". Times Higher Education.
- Newlyn, Lucy, ed. (2016). Dorothy Wordsworth: The Grasmere Journal. The Folio Society.
- Newlyn, Lucy; Agyeman-Duah, Ivor, eds. (2016). May Their Shadows Never Shrink: Wole Soyinka and the Oxford Professorship of Poetry. Banbury: Ayebia Clarke. ISBN 9780992843670.
- Newlyn, Lucy (2018). Diary of a Bipolar Explorer. Oxford: Signal Books. ISBN 9781909930636.
- Newlyn, Lucy (2019). Vital Stream. Manchester: Carcanet. ISBN 9781909930636.
- Newlyn, Lucy (2020). The Marriage Hearse. Maytree Press. ISBN 9781916038196.
- Newlyn, Lucy (2021). The Craft of Poetry: A Primer in Verse. New Haven and London: Yale University Press. ISBN 9780300251913.
- Newlyn, Lucy (2022). Quicksilver. Belfast: Lapwing Publications. ISBN 9781739793883.
- Newlyn, Lucy (2025). The Forum. Amazon. ISBN 979-8-3087-4094-0.
