= Leeds Modern School =

School in Leeds, West Yorkshire, England

Location
- The Ring Road; Lawnswood; Leeds, West Yorkshire, LS16 5AG; England; 53.83590°N 1.59511°W

Information
- Type: State grammar school
- Motto: Fortem Posce Animum (Seek a brave spirit – from 'Seek a brave spirit if you would live in Rome')
- Established: 14 July 1845
- Closed: 1972
- Local authority: City of Leeds
- Head teacher: Frank Holland (1948–71)
- Enrollment: Approx. 700 boys
- Publication: The Owlet

Leeds Modern School was a school in Leeds, West Yorkshire, England.

== History ==
Leeds Modern School was founded on 14 July 1845 in Rossington Street as the Mathematical and Commercial School. This building in the centre of Leeds became council offices after the school moved to a site at Lawnswood in 1931.

During the 1960s, pupils over 16 years of age were allowed to travel to school on motor-cycles and scooters and, with special permission, by car.

The School merged with the girls' grammar school, Lawnswood High School for Girls in 1972 to form the present Lawnswood School. In 1973 the now Lawnswood School became a comprehensive. The school buildings were demolished by Leeds City Council, and replaced with modern buildings in 2003.

== School site ==
The school site was shared with a separate but identical sister school, Lawnswood High School for Girls. Boys attended Leeds Modern, Girls, Lawnswood High. The schools were separated by a joint school's swimming pool and separate dining hall building. Mixing of boys and girls was strictly prohibited.

The school buildings were mainly red brick with stone features and large windows, with internal corridors of brickwork walls and oak parquet flooring. The main hall had a stage at one end, used for assembly, and was lined with scholarship boards. Classrooms accommodated about 32 pupils.

School facilities included about 20 permanent classrooms, chemistry, physics and biology laboratories, lecture rooms, library, gymnasium, and rooms for metal and woodworking, art and music.

== Notable alumni ==
- Bernard Atha CBE, Lord Mayor of Leeds and major figure in arts and sport
- Tony Bell, professor of physics at the University of Oxford and the Rutherford Appleton Laboratory, senior research fellow at Somerville College, Oxford, formerly professor of physics at Imperial College, London
- Alan Bennett, author and playwright
- David Blackbourn, Professor of German and European History at Harvard University and Vanderbilt University
- Robert Blackburn, founder of Blackburn Aircraft
- Wing Commander Sir Eric Bullus, Conservative MP from 1950 to 1974 for Wembley North
- John Craven, TV presenter and journalist
- Henry Drysdale Dakin, biochemist, known for Dakin oxidation and the Dakin–West reaction
- Graham Holderness, writer and critic who has published as author or editor 60 books, mostly on Shakespeare, and hundreds of chapters and articles of criticism, theory and theology
- Martin James Kettle, journalist and author. Kettle is best known as for his long associated as an assistant editor and columnist for The Guardian newspaper
- James Milner, 1st Baron Milner of Leeds, Labour MP from 1929 to 1951 for Leeds South East
- Bob Peck, actor
- Peter Ridsdale, former chairman of Leeds United.
- William Wallace Robson, Masson Professor of English Literature from 1972 to 1990 at the University of Edinburgh
- Guy Schofield, editor of the Daily Mail (1950—1955)
- Sir Douglas Smith KCB, Chairman of Acas (1987—1992)
- Stanley Tiffany CBE, Labour MP from 1945 to 1950 for Peterborough, and Leader of Wakefield Borough Council from 1952 to 1967
- Herbert Hall Turner, astronomer and Savilian Professor of Astronomy from 1893 to 1930 at the University of Oxford
- Brian Woledge, Fielden Professor of French from 1939 to 1971 at University College London

== Notable teachers ==
- John Gunnell taught at the school from 1959 to 1962. He was the leader of West Yorkshire County Council from 1981 to 1986, and Labour MP for Morley and Leeds South from 1992 to 1997, and Morley and Rothwell from 1997 to 2001.
- Brian Page OBE a teacher, at Maidstone grammar school, then as head of modern languages at Leeds Modern. He moved to Leeds University in 1971 to establish the central language laboratories (which became the language centre). He was honoured by the French and British governments for his work, becoming an Officier dans L'Ordre des Palmes Académiques and an OBE. In 2002, CILT, the National Centre for Languages, awarded him a prestigious Comenius fellowship.
- Robert Shaw, was head of English, 1964–1968. In addition to his teaching at Leeds Modern, during those years, he was also visiting fellow in English and education at the University of York and part-time tutor in twentieth-century English literature at the University of Leeds. He later lectured at the University of Southampton from 1968 to 1972, resigning to become a full-time poet, critic (including TV and radio) and jazz saxophonist – he was a pioneer of poetry and jazz fusion.
