= David Blackbourn =

British-born historian (born 1949)

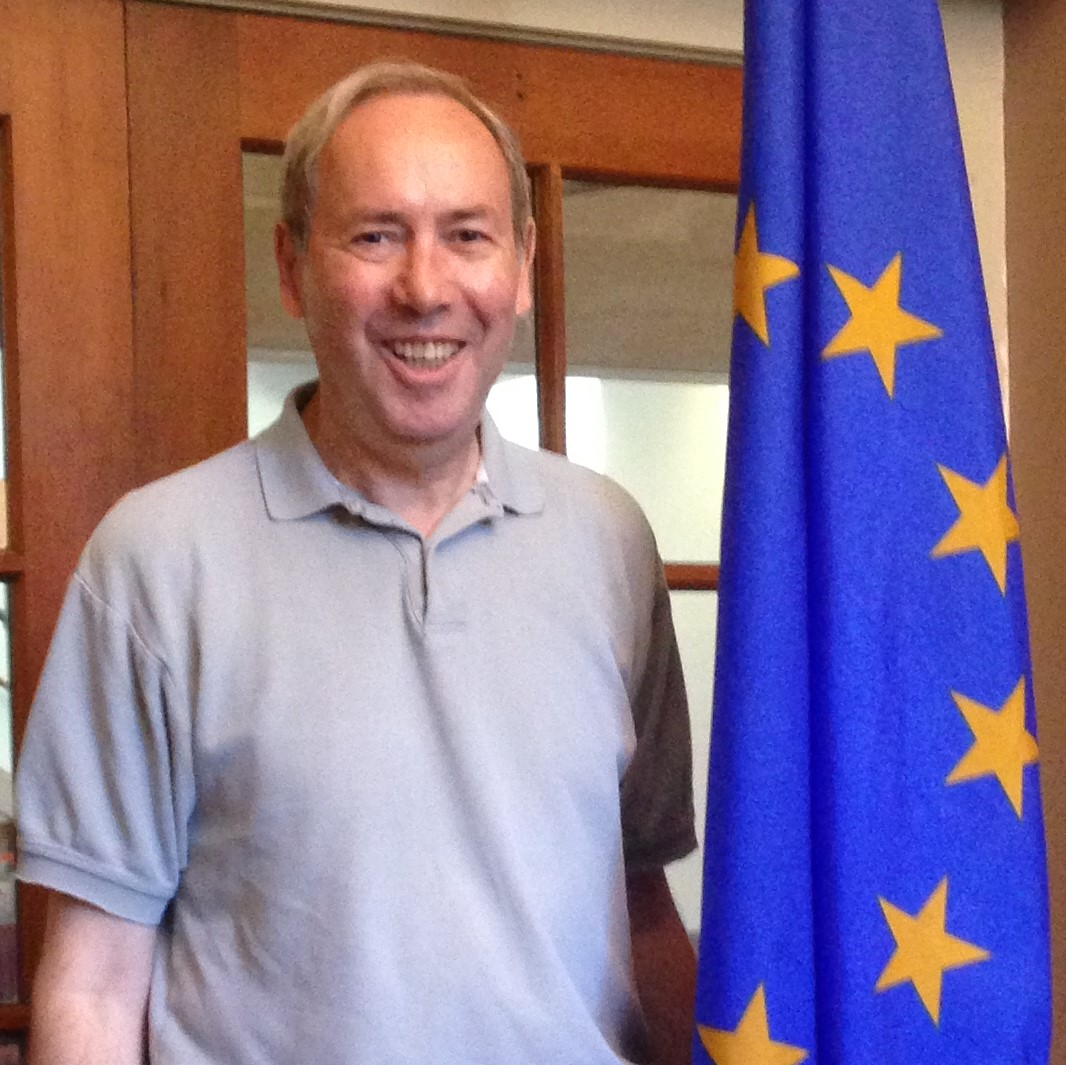
- Born: 1949 (age 76–77); Spilsby, Lincolnshire, England
- Board member of: Editorial board of Past & Present; Academic advisory board of the Institute for European History Mainz; Advisory board of the Friends of the German Historical Institute, Washington; Trustee of the National Humanities Center
- Awards: Guggenheim Fellowship (1994); Fellow of the American Academy of Arts and Sciences (2007)

Academic background
- Education: Leeds Modern School; Christ's College; Cambridge, Jesus College, Cambridge

Academic work
- Discipline: History
- Sub-discipline: Modern German History, Modern European History
- Institutions: Queen Mary College; Birkbeck College; Harvard University; Vanderbilt University

David Gordon Blackbourn (born 1949 in Spilsby, Lincolnshire, England) is Cornelius Vanderbilt distinguished chair of history at Vanderbilt University, where he teaches modern German and European history. Prior to arriving at Vanderbilt, Blackbourn was Coolidge Professor of history at Harvard University.

== Career ==
Blackbourn went to Leeds Modern School (now Lawnswood School), and then read history at Christ's College, Cambridge, before moving to Jesus College.

After completing his dissertation at Jesus College, Blackbourn became a lecturer at Queen Mary College in 1976, before joining the faculty of Birkbeck College in 1979.

In 1992 Blackbourn moved to the US, where he was Coolidge Professor of history at Harvard, and served as director of the university's Minda de Gunzburg Center for European Studies from 2007 to 2012. He was awarded a Guggenheim Fellowship in 1994. He was chair of the Harvard History Department from 1998 to 1999 and again from 2000 to 2002. In 2007, he was elected a fellow of the American Academy of Arts and Sciences.

He is on the editorial board of the journal Past & Present; the academic advisory board of the Institute for European History, Mainz; and the advisory board of the Friends of the German Historical Institute, Washington. He was president of the Conference Group on Central European History of the American Historical Association (since 2012 called Central European History Society) in 2003–2004. Since 2016, he has served as a trustee of the National Humanities Center in Research Triangle Park, North Carolina.

== Works ==
- Class, Religion, and Local Politics in Wilhelmine Germany (1980)
- The Peculiarities of German History (with Geoff Eley, 1984)
- Populists and Patricians (1987)
- The German Bourgeoisie (co-edited with Richard J. Evans, 1991)
- Marpingen: Apparitions of the Virgin Mary in Nineteenth-Century Germany (1994)
- The Long Nineteenth Century: A History of Germany, 1780–1918 (1997)
- The Conquest of Nature: Water, Landscape, and the Making of Modern Germany (2006)
- Germany in the World: A Global History, 1500–2000 (2023)
