= Stephen Wordsworth =

British diplomat

Stephen John Wordsworth LVO CMG (born 1955) is a former British diplomat, now executive director of the Council for Assisting Refugee Academics

== Biography ==
Wordsworth was born in Port Talbot, South Wales, and educated at St John's School Porthcawl, Epsom College and Downing College, Cambridge, where he studied German and Russian (MA).

He joined the Foreign and Commonwealth Office (FCO) in 1977. He served abroad in Moscow in Leonid Brezhnev’s last years, in Lagos through two military coups, in Bonn during the process of German reunification and at Supreme Headquarters Allied Powers Europe as a Political Adviser to SACEURs George Joulwan and Wesley Clark for three years during NATO's IFOR and SFOR operations in Bosnia and Herzegovina. In London, he held a range of posts in the FCO and Cabinet Office, including as FCO Section Head for relations with East Germany and Berlin as the Berlin Wall came down, and as FCO Head of Department dealing with the Western Balkans when Slobodan Milosevic was overthrown. His last two overseas posts were as Minister/Deputy Head of Mission in Moscow during Vladimir Putin’s presidency, and as ambassador in Belgrade. He had a high media profile in Serbia, and was the first foreign Ambassador in Belgrade to start blogging on current affairs.

In 1992 he was honoured by the Queen, being appointed Lieutenant of the Royal Victorian Order (LVO) for his part in the organisation of her State Visit that year to Germany. At the same time he was awarded the Officer's Cross of the Order of Merit of the Federal Republic of Germany. He was made a Companion of the Order of St Michael and St George (CMG) in 2011.

After leaving the FCO, Wordsworth joined the Council for Assisting Refugee Academics (CARA) as executive director in 2012. Founded as the Academic Assistance Council in 1933 by William Beveridge, A V Hill and others, to assist Jewish and other academics forced to flee the Nazi regime, CARA now works with a network of some 70 universities in the UK to support academics from all over the world who have been forced to flee their home countries by discrimination, violence and death threats, at the hands of repressive regimes and extremist groups. CARA also operates overseas programmes to support academics in Iraq and Zimbabwe.

Wordsworth was a member of the first cohort to take the Financial Times non-executive director Certificate course, graduating in 2012 . He is also a member of the British-Serbian Chamber of Commerce and of Northchapel Parish Council, in West Sussex.

His wife, Nichole, was also a member of the British Diplomatic Service. They have one son.

== Career ==
2012 – date: Executive Director, CARA (Council for Assisting Refugee Academics)

2006 – 2010: British Ambassador, Belgrade, Serbia

2003 – 2005: Deputy Head of Mission, British Embassy, Moscow, Russia

1999 – 2002: Head, Western Balkans Department, FCO

1994 – 1998: Political Adviser to the NATO Supreme Allied Commander Europe, Mons, Belgium

1990 – 1994: British Embassy, Bonn, Germany

1988 – 1990: Section Head, FCO, for relations with the GDR and for Allied responsibilities in Berlin under Quadripartite status, later for German Unification

1986 – 1988: Cabinet Office, London

1983 – 1986: British High Commission, Lagos, Nigeria

1982 – 1983: Eastern European and Soviet Department, FCO

1981: Presidency Secretariat, UK Presidency of the European Community

1979 – 1981: British Embassy, Moscow, USSR

1977 – 1979: Eastern European and Soviet Department, FCO

== External sources ==
- Who's Who, 2009, A & C Black, London, page 2562
- The Diplomatic Service List 2004, The Stationery Office, London, page 336
- Council for Assisting Refugee Academics Website
- British Serbian Chamber of Commerce Website
- Northchapel Village Website
- British Embassy Belgrade Website
- British Embassy Moscow Website
- Financial Times Non-Executive Directors' Course Website
