= Esther Simpson =

English humanitarian (1903–1996)

Esther Simpson OBE
- Esther Simpson, credited to The Lotte Meitner-Graf Archive and copyrighted by The Lotte Meitner-Graf Archive.
- Born: Esther Sinovitch; 31 July 1903; Leeds, Yorkshire
- Died: 19 November 1996 (aged 93)
- Occupations: humanitarian; support for persecuted academics
- Years active: 1933 until death in 1996

Esther Simpson OBE (née Sinovitch; 31 July 1903 – 19 November 1996) was an English humanitarian who was the Assistant Secretary, later Secretary, of the Academic Assistance Council (AAC) and its successor organisations from 1933 until 1978. She worked tirelessly throughout her life to establish work and connections for refugee academics, using many contacts, including with figures like Einstein and Wittgenstein. Her work on behalf of some of the world's greatest scientific minds fleeing persecution combined affection with toughness. Refugees she helped during the Second World War included 16 future Nobel Prize winners, 74 future Fellows of the Royal Society and 34 future Fellows of the British Academy. She described her work as the "academic equivalent of the kindertransport programme".

She was awarded the OBE at Buckingham Palace in 1956 and received honorary degrees from the University of London and the University of Leeds in 1981 and 1989 respectively.

Esther Simpson, known as Tess to her friends, was best known for being a devoted lobbyist and organiser for the Academic Assistance Council. Working closely with scholarly immigrants such as Leo Szilard, she assisted hundreds of refugee academics during and after the Second World War and enabled them to obtain work positions all over the world. She worked with several organisations to promote the acceptance of refugees under the tensions that arose from the Nazi regime and later other global conflicts.

== Early life ==
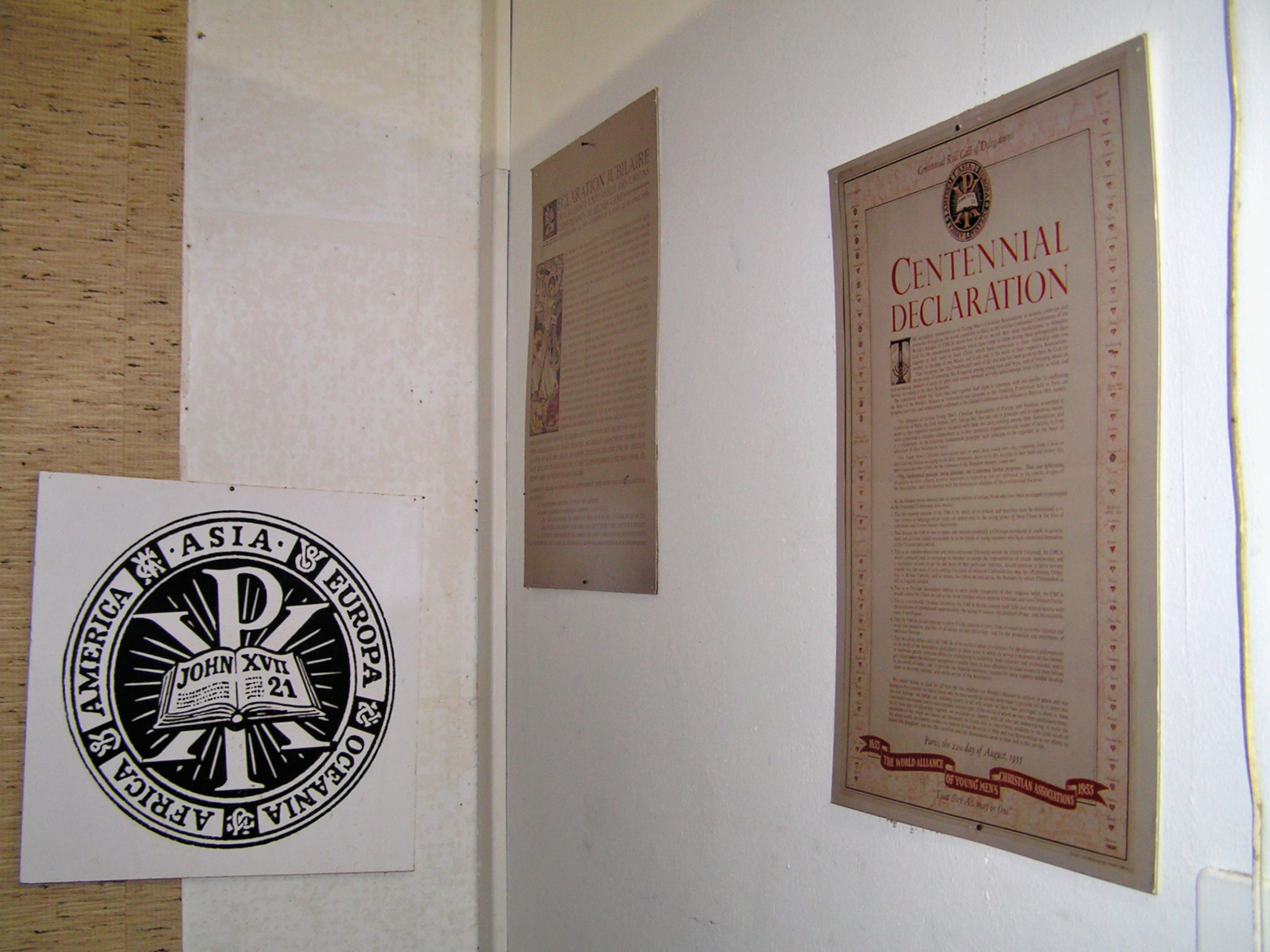
Logo of the World Alliance of the YMCA in Geneva where Simpson worked before the AAC.

Esther Simpson, born Esther Sinovitch, was born on 31 July 1903, in Leeds, Yorkshire, to Jewish parents. She was the youngest of her four siblings and was raised in a lower-middle-class family. Her parents were immigrants from Russia who were very young when they moved to Leeds to escape the pogroms. Her father worked in a garment factory. She attended the Leeds Girls' Modern School and then the University of Leeds from 1921 to 1925 on a scholarship where she was awarded a first class degree in Modern Languages. Simpson was fluent in German and French, in addition to her native English.

After graduating, she worked in Europe, first as a governess for a wealthy family in Germany and then briefly in Paris. In 1928 she accepted a job at the International Fellowship of Reconciliation in Vienna where she worked for a few years until being employed by the World Alliance of the YMCA in Geneva in 1933. In July 1933 she accepted a lower paying job in central London offered by the Academic Assistance Council (from 1936 called the Society of Protection of Science and Learning and then Cara, the Council for At-Risk Academics from 2014), as she believed she could make a valuable contribution there.

== Personal life ==
Simpson changed her name from Sinovitch on 21 August 1933, one month after she had started to help people whose names suggested an alien status to Britons.

Simpson was deeply attached to her work and never married or had children. Simpson's friends recall her as someone who had a general concern for humanity. Simpson called herself a member of the Society of Friends, understood the importance of assisting refugee scholars and was dedicated to her work. She was known as Miss Simpson to strangers, Esther to colleagues, and Tess to her close friends. She believed her upbringing as a child of immigrants in Britain allowed her to be more critical, and therefore successful in her work She was aware that refugee organisations were not able to do everything, but she wanted to help in any way that she could.

Simpson's life-long passion was music and she was a gifted violinist, starting violin lessons when she was nine years old. As a child she gained certificates and medals for the violin from the Leeds College of Music. Simpson developed her craft and became an amateur of professional standard. Some professionals were delighted to play with her, such as the violinist Max Rostal. She said: "Music enriched my life by providing me with wonderful friends – meeting a musician was so often like a pebble cast in a pool whose ripples go on to eternity."

== Career ==
=== Academic Assistance Council and Society for Protection of Science and Learning ===
In the summer of 1933, while Simpson was living in Geneva, she was hired as an assistant secretary and then later became the administrator and executive assistant of the Academic Assistance Council (AAC) as it was called at the time, through Leo Szilard. The AAC was set up to help academics fleeing from the Nazi regime by offering them grants and aiding them to find new employment around the world. It had an office in London through William Beveridge at the London School of Economics and Ludwig von Mises . There were only two employees, the Secretary, Walter Adam (later director of the London School of Economics), and Simpson as Assistant Secretary. She was therefore responsible for carrying out most of the work of the charity. This included organizing support for these refugees and also lobbied for selective suspicion of those of German or Austrian origin now in Britain; many who had fled repression had skills of value to their new home country. In 1940, Simpson was responsible for drawing up a list of over 550 candidates who were being interned in Britain, and developing cases to support releasing them.

At the outbreak of the war in 1939, Simpson managed to register around 2,000 scholars. By the 1940s, the AAC was renamed to the Society for the Protection of Science and Learning (SPSL) and was great being led by Simpson. At this point, they were working to aid the refugee scholars confirmed as aliens, who were interned by the British government, in addition to their work with the refugee scholars who were fleeing Nazi Germany and the Nazi-occupied European territories. One of the leading figures in studying the science of language, Otto Neurath was briefly interned at one of these centres in the British Isles. It was Simpson and her work that obtained his release in 1941. Neurath then continued his own research and work at the University of Oxford.

Simpson was vital in processing the application forms that the SPSL received. The forms asked for various details, such as personal details, income, academic qualifications, language proficiency, and where they would prefer to go if they end up being considered. Simpson would then make decisions over who to support, obtain references, and seek to place them at institutions mainly in the UK, Commonwealth and USA. Refugee academics were provided with help to move to their new homes. She organized and obtained finance for lecture tours to the United States and, according to personal accounts, they were often offered work immediately afterwards. Simpson struggled to place academics in some disciplines, including law, history, and art history that were more country-specific, although some art historians were found positions as curators. Other disciplines, particularly science, had more employment opportunities. They also struggled to place German refugee scholars, as they had German educations, which were less preferred than those educated in Britain.

Simpson was committed to her job and worked overtime, until late in the evenings, even at the start in her lower position when she was receiving a third of her previous salary. She believed there was no time for holidays; her first holiday since beginning her work with the Society was in 1951. She was essential in carrying out the daily work of the organization in her position as the administrator. Simpson was also vital in communications between the refugee scholars and the organization, as she was responsible for writing letters and keeping up with correspondence, writing tens of thousands of letters during her employment.

== Post-Second World War ==
At the end of the war, Simpson continued her work with the AAC, particularly in finding where the scholars who had not escaped were located. This meant not only helping the survivors of the war find new homes but also advising the friends and family of the scholars who had not survived of their fate. She was dedicated to reuniting academics with their families whenever possible, as she considered the people she helped to be her family.

In 1944, Esther Simpson left the SPSL for a post as the assistant secretary at the government-sponsored Society for Visiting Scientists. She worked at the SVS from 1944 until 1966 when it closed. However, from 1951 she also undertook voluntary work for the SPSL that continued to help persecuted academics, and in 1966 she re-joined the SPSL as a full time employee. A colleague wrote, "though Hitler was dead, intolerance went on." The organisations aided refugees fleeing from Eastern Europe and the Stalinist regime in the USSR, as well as those fleeing the regimes in South Africa, Chile, and Argentina.

== Esther's children ==
Throughout her life, Esther Simpson helped save many hundreds of lives, of scientists, philosophers, historians, artists, musicians and architects, who would go on to contribute to intellectual and cultural life throughout the globe. In 1983, Simpson created a list of all the refugee scholars and their children, who were saved through the SPSL and had received distinctions. The list contained 16 Nobel Prize Laureates, 80 fellows of the Royal Society, and 34 fellows of the British Academy as well as those who had received other awards. Many who had not receive distinctions had still contributed to knowledge, culture, education and learning in Britain, the United States, and other parts of the world.

Some of Esther's Children

Nikolaus Pevsner

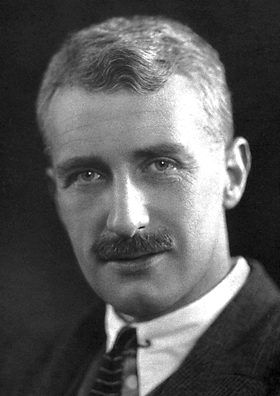
Archibald Vivian Hill

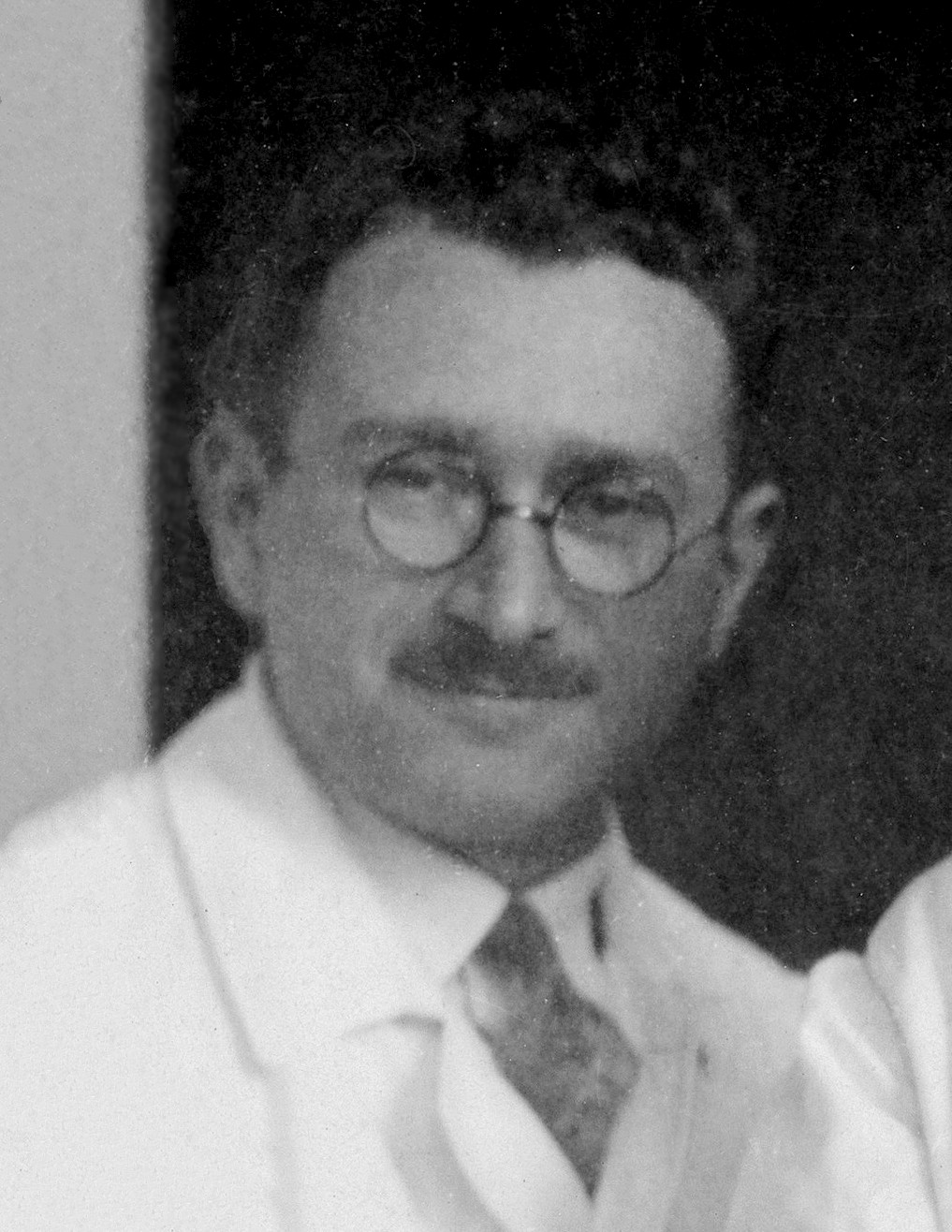
Ludwig Guttmann

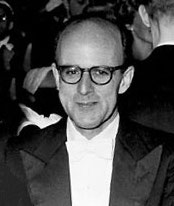
Max Perutz

She formed friendships with many of her "children", including famous violinist Max Rostal and was the only amateur to be tutored under him. She regularly had supper with Nikolaus Pevsner, who brought new perspectives on the UK's architectural heritage to scholars and the wider public. A.V. Hill, who won a Nobel Prize in Physiology and Medicine, had 40 years of correspondence with Tess. Additionally, Ludwig Guttmann, who founded the Paralympics, and Max Perutz, the Nobel laureate molecular biologist, had correspondence with her.

It is also during her time working for the Society that Simpson became a friend and confidant of Engelbert Broda, an Austrian chemist. Her correspondences with him were less formal than those with other refugee scholars. They managed their friendship even though they had different political views, being that Broda was a communist.

Additionally, the scholars she saved cared deeply for her. At her retirement party in 1966, which was attended by lords, knights, and professors, money was donated to Simpson, who had worked at a small salary and did not have savings, to help her with retirement. Not only did they raise enough money to buy her a flat in Belsize Park, London, but letters poured in as well from Australia, the US, Canada, Japan, Germany, Austria, Switzerland, Israel and elsewhere, expressing gratitude and love. She ran the SPSL from this flat.

Until her death, Esther Simpson would walk to the local shop every day to get a newspaper and The Times to cut out clippings of the work her "children" were doing around the world.

== Awards and achievements ==
In 1949 the French government awarded her the Ordre des Palmes Académiques and she became an Officer d'Académie. She then went on to be awarded the honour of Officer of the Order of the British Empire (OBE) in 1956. She also received an LLD (Doctorate of Laws) from the University of London in 1981 and at her alma mater, the University of Leeds in 1989. She received an honorary membership at the Royal College of Physicians in Britain in 1991 and according to the Registrar at the time of appointment, he said: "the honour can seldom go to a more deserving person."

== Later life and death ==
Esther Simpson continued playing music, in particular, the violin and viola, until her deafness worsened in her seventies.

In 1992, Simpson collaborated with Ray Cooper to create the book "Refugee Scholars: Conversations with Tess Simpson". The book is an informal account of her life and career. Max Perutz and Sir Ernst Gombrich assisted and attended her book launch.

She died on 19 November 1996, at age 93. She donated all her correspondence, letters, clippings, and documents she collected throughout her life to the University of Leeds Archives. In her will and last testament, she specified to have her flat donated back to the SPSL.

== Commemoration ==
In January 2020 the University of Leeds announced that a new building shared by Leeds University Business School and the School of Law, due to open in 2021, would be named the Esther Simpson Building. On 8 March 2022, a blue plaque was unveiled in Simpson's memory at the opening of the building.

Simpson's name is one of those featured on the sculpture Ribbons, unveiled in 2024.

== Bibliography ==
- Brinson, Charmian, Jana Burešová, and Andrea Hammel. Exile and Gender II: Politics, Education and the Arts. Leiden: Brill Rodopi, 2017.
- Edmonds, David (11 May 2017). "Esther Simpson – the Unknown Heroine". The Jewish Chronicle.
- Edmonds, David (12 May 2017). "Miss Simpson's Children". BBC Radio 4.
- Hoch, Paul K. (10 March 1983). "The Reception of Central European Refugee Physicists of the 1930s: U.S.S.R., U.K., U.S.A". Annals of Science. 40 (3): 217–46. doi:10.1080/00033798300200211.
- Holfter, Gisela and Horst Dickel. An Irish Sanctuary German-speaking Refugees in Ireland 1933–1945. Berlin: De Gruyter Oldenbourg, 2018.
- Jean Medawar; David Pike (24 December 1996). "Obituary: Esther Simpson". The Independent.
- Rall, Jack A. (2017). "Nobel Laureate A. V. Hill and the Refugee Scholars, 1933–1945". Advances in Physiology Education. 41 (2): 248–59. doi:10.1152/advan.00181.2016. PMID 28442477. S2CID 38948795.
- Rider, Robin E. (1984). "Alarm and Opportunity: Emigration of Mathematicians and Physicists to Britain and the United States, 1933–1945". Historical Studies in the Physical Sciences. 15 (1): 107–76. doi:10.2307/27757544. JSTOR 27757544.
- Seabrook, Jeremy. The Refuge and the Fortress Britain and the Flight from Tyranny. Basingstoke: Palgrave Macmillan, 2009.
- Snowman, Daniel. The Hitler Emigres: The Cultural Impact on Britain of Refugees from Nazism. London: Pimlico, 2013.
- Starr-Egger, Felicitas M. (22 May 2017). "7 Women Refugee Academics at the University of London". Exile and Gender II: Politics, Education and the Arts: 96–113. doi:10.1163/9789004343528_009. ISBN 9789004343528.
- "Politics and Social History". University of Leeds.
- Weydner, Sara (24 July 2018). "BBC-Documentary 'Miss Simpson's Children' How a Woman Ran a Refugee Organisation". The London Moment.
- Zimmerman, David (March 2006). "The Society for the Protection of Science and Learning and the Politicization of British Science in the 1930s". Minerva. 44 (1): 25–45. doi:10.1007/s11024-005-5405-8. S2CID 144003010.
- Zimmerman, David (June 2007). "'Narrow-Minded People': Canadian Universities and the Academic Refugee Crises, 1933–1941". Canadian Historical Review. 88 (2): 291–315. doi:10.3138/chr.88.2.291.
