= Martin Kettle =

British journalist and author (born 1949)

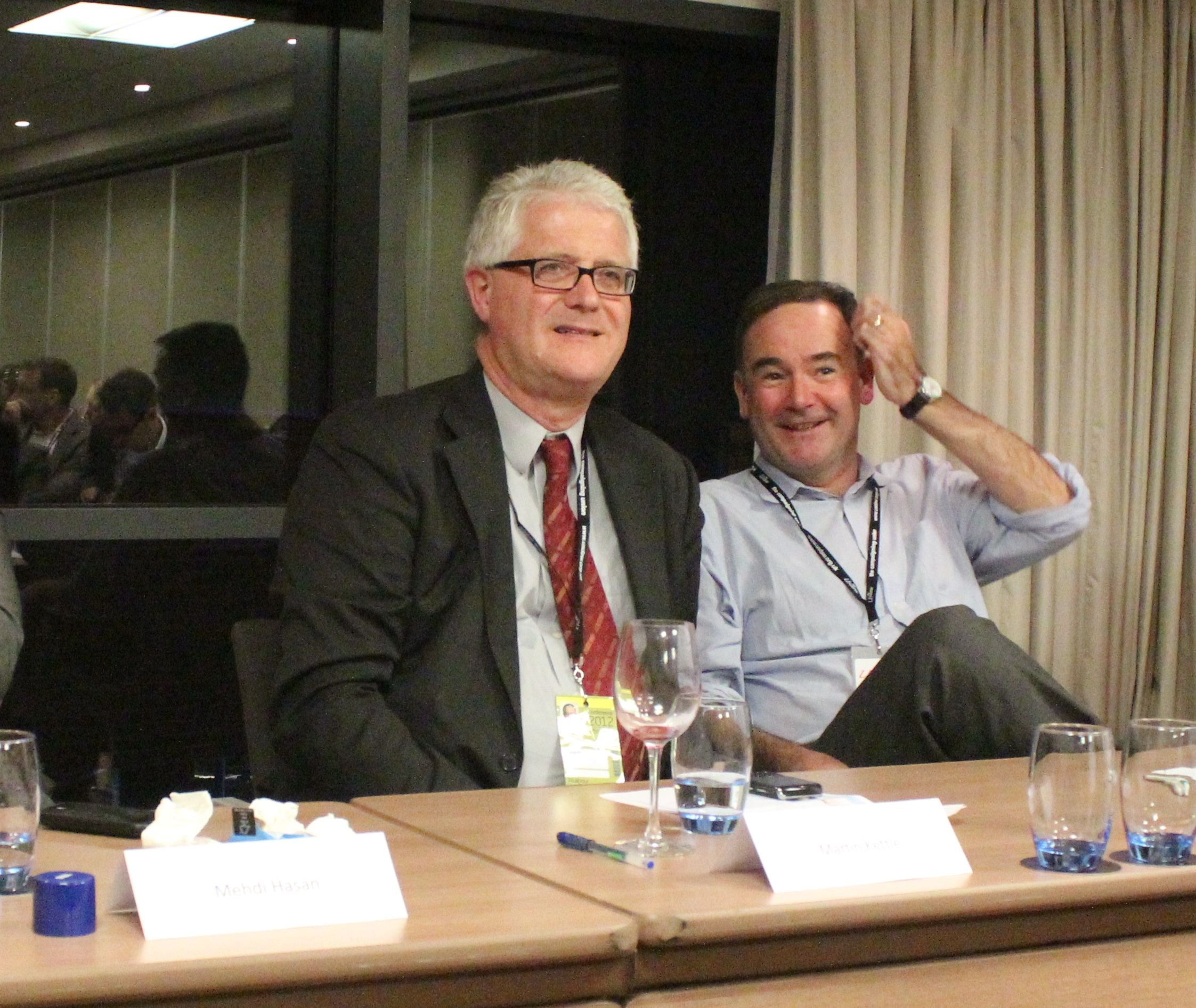
- Kettle (left) in 2012
- Born: September 7, 1949 (age 76)
- Education: Leeds Modern School
- Alma mater: Balliol College, Oxford
- Occupations: Journalist, author
- Writing career
- Years active: 1977-

Martin James Kettle (born 7 September 1949) is a British journalist and author. Kettle is best known as for his long associated as an assistant editor and columnist for The Guardian newspaper.

== Early life and education ==
Kettle is the son of two communist activists, Arnold Kettle (best remembered as a literary critic; 1916–1986) and Margot Kettle (née Gale; 1916–1995). Kettle grew up in Far Headingley was educated at Leeds Modern School. He graduated in modern history from Balliol College, Oxford having matriculated in 1967.

== Career ==
Kettle worked for the National Council for Civil Liberties (now known as Liberty) as a research officer from 1973. He then began his career in journalism as home affairs correspondent for New Society (1977–1981) and moved to The Sunday Times in 1981, working as a political correspondent for three years. He has been with The Guardian since 1984 and also wrote regularly for Marxism Today in its later years. He writes a column on classical music in Prospect magazine.

Kettle is a long-term contributor to for The Guardian, where he is assistant editor, having worked as the newspaper's Washington D.C. bureau chief from 1997 to 2001. He was formerly a leader writer (1993–1997) and chief leader writer from 2001 onward. He has often defended New Labour and Tony Blair (a personal friend) – though not over the Iraq War. Kettle has been dismissed by John Pilger as Blair's "most devoted promoter".

== Bibliography ==
- Hain, Peter; Kettle, Martin et al., Policing the Police, 1979, John Calder, ISBN 0-7145-3628-8. Rev. ed. 1980: ISBN 0-7145-3795-0
- Kettle, Martin & Hodges, Lucy, Uprising!: Police, the People and the Riots in Britain's Cities, 1982, Macmillan, ISBN 0-330-26845-7
- Kettle, Martin (ed.), Guardian Guide to Europe, 1993, Fourth Estate, ISBN 1-85702-119-3
- Kettle, Martin, The Single Currency: Should Britain Join?, 1997, Vintage, ISBN 0-09-977351-1
