= Lawnswood School =

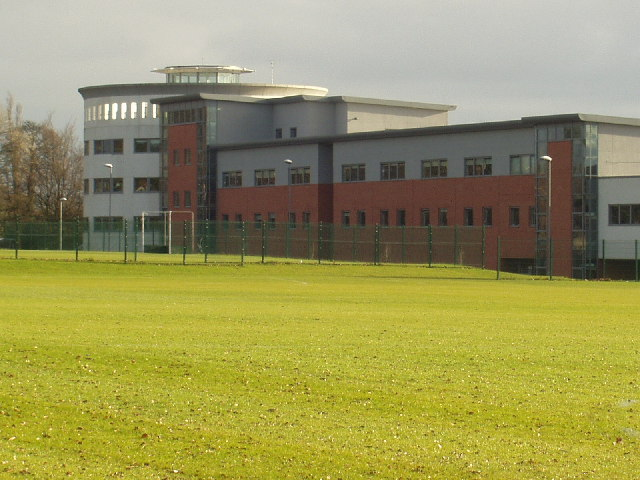

Location
- Leeds Outer Ring Road; Lawnswood; Leeds, West Yorkshire, LS16 5AG; England; 53.8358°N 1.5951°W

Information
- Type: Community school
- Established: 1972
- Local authority: Leeds City Council
- Department for Education URN: 108055 Tables
- Ofsted: Reports
- Headteacher: Joanna Bell
- Gender: Mixed
- Age: 11 to 18
- Enrolment: 1,098
- Website: www.lawnswoodschool.co.uk

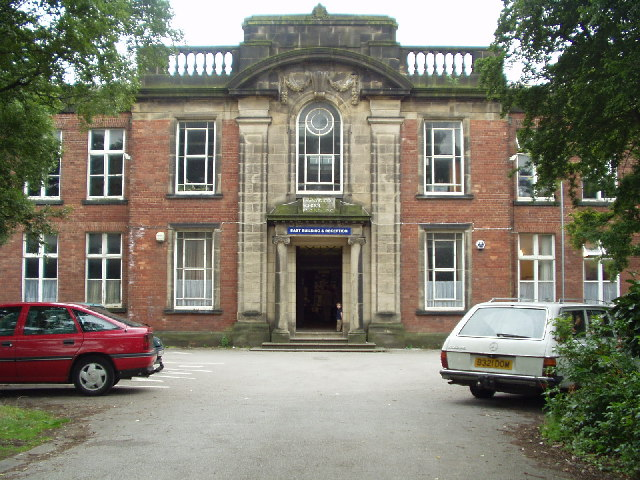
The previous buildings, vacated by the school in 2003.

Lawnswood School is a mixed secondary school and sixth form located in the Lawnswood area of Leeds, West Yorkshire, England.

The school was founded in 1972 and had its first comprehensive intake in 1974. Its predecessors were the Leeds Modern School, a boys' grammar school (founded 1845) attended by Alan Bennett, and Lawnswood High School for Girls, a girls' grammar school (founded 1854), which moved to the current Lawnswood site in 1932.

The sixth form was judged as Grade 2 and "consistently good" in the 2009 Ofsted inspection, but the school as a whole was rated as Grade 4 (Inadequate) for overall effectiveness. and consequently placed into special measures. During an early 2011 Ofsted visit, the school was judged to be "making good progress in all the key areas," and in July 2011 the school was taken out of special measures. In late 2013, Ofsted rated the school Grade 2 (Good) for overall effectiveness.

== Notable former pupils ==
- Mark Ballard, former Member of the Scottish Parliament
- Alan Bennett, English playwright, screenwriter and author (Leeds Modern School)
- Eleanor Catton, 2013 Man Booker Prize winner (foreign exchange)
- John Craven BBC journalist and television presenter (Leeds Modern School)
- Stuart Croft, artist
- Jane Wynne, paediatrician

== See also ==
- Leeds Modern School
- Lawnswood High School for Girls
