= Lawnswood High School =

School in Leeds, England

Coordinates: 53.846°N 1.591°W

Lawnswood High School was a girls' grammar school in Lawnswood, north Leeds, West Yorkshire, England, close to the A660.

== History ==
In 1854 the Leeds Mechanics Institute set up a girls' school, The Ladies Educational Institution, at 4 South Parade, Leeds. It later moved to Queens Square, and the name was changed to Leeds Girls' School in 1868 when it moved to the Leeds Mechanics Institute (the building which now houses Leeds City Museum). In 1909 it was renamed Leeds Girls' Modern School, and at this time it was in premises in Willow Terrace.

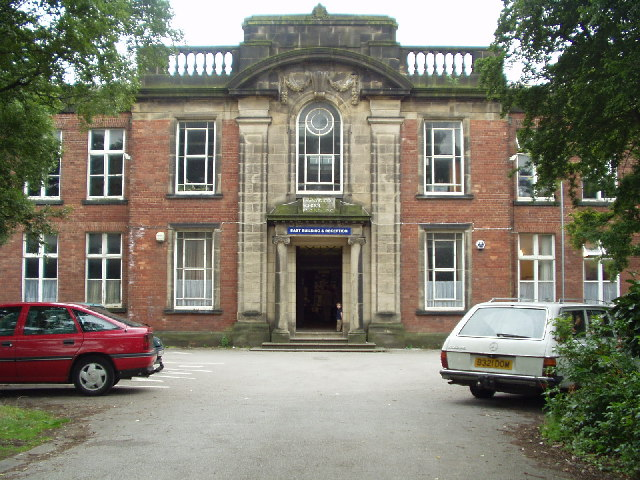
East Building, Lawnswood, before demolition (2003)

In 1932 the school moved to Lawnswood and took the name Lawnswood High School. It was to merge with its brother school Leeds Modern School, a boys' grammar school, in 1972 to form the school now known as Lawnswood School.

== Notable alumni ==
- Prof Karin Barber, Professor of African Cultural Anthropology from 1999 to 2017 at the University of Birmingham
- Elaine Burton, Baroness Burton of Coventry, Labour MP from 1950 to 1959 for Coventry South
- Joan Firth CB, Chair of Bradford Health Authority from 1998 to 2000
- Catherine Bennett, journalist and commentator
- Esther Simpson, organiser of academic equivalent of the kindertransport, saving refugee scholars from Nazis
