= Council for At-Risk Academics =

British charitable organisation

The Council for At-Risk Academics (CARA) is a charitable British organisation dedicated to assisting academics in immediate danger, those forced into exile, and many who choose to remain in their home countries despite the serious risks they face. Cara also supports higher education institutions whose continuing work is at risk or compromised. Cara offers academics support to continue their studies either by financially and logistically assisting scholars relocate to higher education institutions abroad or by assisting academics in their country of origin.

The organisation was founded in 1933 as the Academic Assistance Council (AAC), to assist academics who were forced to flee the Nazi regime. In 1936 it was consolidated and renamed the Society for the Protection of Science and Learning (SPSL). In 1999 it was renamed the Council for Assisting Refugee Academics (CARA). It changed to its current name in 2014. The charity is currently based on the premises of London Southbank University and continues to provide support to academics in danger.

== History ==
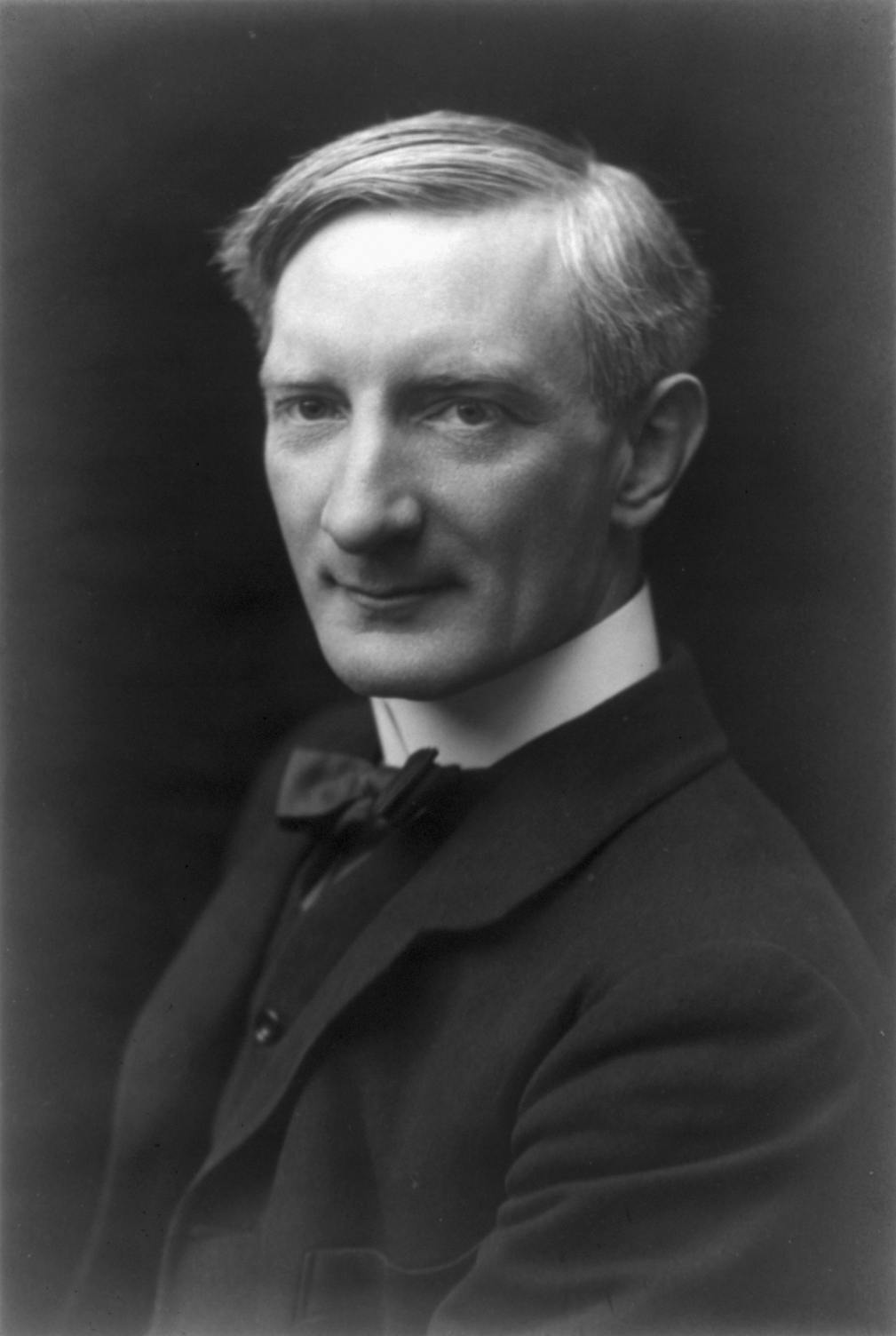
William Beveridge

The Academic Assistance Council (AAC) was founded in April 1933 by William Beveridge. Whilst en route to Vienna he learnt of the dismissal of a number of leading professors from German universities on racial and/or political grounds and was moved to launch a ‘rescue operation’ for the increasing numbers of displaced academics. On his return to Britain Beveridge set about enlisting the support of prominent academics. Figure-head and first President became Lord Ernest Rutherford.

By May 22, 1933, a founding statement had been produced and it was circulated amongst British universities, politicians and philanthropists. This initial rallying call focused on the need for practical support, assistance escaping persecution and relocating in British universities, and deliberately avoided making any sort of political comment.

The council was formed of 41 men and women active in British intellectual activities, and had as assistant secretary, the "redoubtable" Esther Simpson, with office accommodation provided by The Royal Society. The Nobel Prize-winning chemist and physicist Lord Rutherford was chosen as the first President. A.V. Hill, another Nobel Prize-winning scientist, and also Cambridge University MP, became Vice-President.The council included J. S. Haldane and Sir Frederick Gowland Hopkins, Lord Rayleigh, Sir William Henry Bragg.

In October 1933, ten thousand people attended an event at the Royal Albert Hall in London organised by several organisations including the AAC. Albert Einstein, in his last major public address in Europe before taking up his post at Princeton University in the United States, spoke on the importance of academic freedom. Receiving wild cheers throughout his speech, he encouraged the audience to "resist the powers which threaten to suppress intellectual and individual freedom" and spoke of our duty to "care for what is eternal and highest amongst our possessions".

In 1936, the AAC changed its name to the Society for Protection of Science and Learning (SPSL). This change reflected the ideological development of the role of the organisation: from assisting individual academics, to the protection of academic freedom itself. Thousands of academics were helped by SPSL in the 1930s and 1940s; some, having escaped Nazi Germany and Austria, then needed further aid to be released from British internment on the Isle of Man as enemy aliens. Sixteen academics assisted became Nobel Laureates, eighteen were knighted and over a hundred were elected as Fellows of the British Academy or the Royal Society. Notably Ludwig Guttmann went on to found the Paralympics; Max Born was a pioneer of quantum mechanics and one of the most prominent physicists to oppose the development of nuclear weapons; and Ernst Chain would be instrumental in the discovery of penicillin.

The SPSL's work continued past the end of the Second World War. Beveridge would later explain in his A Defence of Free Learning (1959) how "although Hitler was dead, intolerance was not" and "continued needs and the possible future crises" rendered the Society's services as necessary as ever, in Europe and across the world.

In the 1940s and 1950s, the SPSL helped many academics seeking refuge from the Stalinist regimes in the USSR and Eastern Europe. As time passed, the SPSL's focus expanded, to include, among others, those fleeing the apartheid regime in South Africa and juntas in Chile and Argentina. One of the most prominent South African exiles, whom the SPSL helped in 1966 and again in 1988, was the anti-apartheid leader Albie Sachs, later a Justice in the South African Constitutional Court under Nelson Mandela. Sachs describes the "immense moral and emotional comfort" which SPSL's assistance provided and he continues to be a supporter of the charity.

Since the 1990s, SPSL's focus has shifted to the Middle East, particularly Iraq and Iran, and to troubled regions of Africa. In 1999, SPSL was renamed Council for Assisting Refugee Academics (Cara). In 2014, Cara was renamed again, but retained its acronym, becoming the Council for At-Risk Academics. This change reflected the fact that Cara helps many who are at great risk but do not see themselves as ‘refugees’, and instead still hope to return to their home countries when conditions allow.

== Prominent academics assisted by AAC/SPSL/Cara ==
Amongst the 1,500 academics assisted in the early years, sixteen went on to win Nobel Prizes, eighteen received Knighthoods, well over a hundred were elected as Fellows of the Royal Society and of the British Academy, and many more became leaders in their respective fields.

- Sir Walter Bodmer, a prominent human geneticist who is also credited with expanding public understanding of the sciences.
- Sir Hermann Bondi, a mathematician who helped develop radar and influenced relativity theory, served as Chief Scientist to two UK government departments and as Master of Churchill College, Cambridge.
- Max Born became the Tait Professor of Natural Philosophy at the University of Edinburgh and won the Nobel Prize in 1954 for his pioneering work in quantum mechanics.
- Sir Ernst Chain won the Nobel Prize in 1945 for his shared work on penicillin.
- Sir Geoffrey Elton, a historian and philosopher of history, helped to advance understanding of the Tudor government.
- Sir Ernst Gombrich brought fundamental questions of aesthetics in art to scholarly and public attention.
- Sir Ludwig Guttmann and his family were helped to emigrate from Nazi Germany in 1939. SPSL negotiated with the Home Office on their behalf, donated a sum of £250 (equivalent to around £10,000 in today's money) and helped them to establish themselves in Oxford. Here they stayed in the family of home of Sansie Lindsay, SPSL Councillor and Master of Balliol College. Guttmann went on to found the National Spinal Injuries Clinic in Stoke Mandeville Hospital where he revolutionised the treatment of those with spinal injury and went on to establish what would go on to become the Paralympics.
- Sir Peter Hirsch modernised the study of materials science and engineering at Oxford University.
- Sir Otto Kahn-Freund was a leading theorist and practitioner of labour law.
- Sir Bernard Katz won the Nobel Prize in 1950 for shared research on mechanisms of neuro-muscular transmission.
- Sir Hans Kornberg works on the nature and regulation of carbohydrate transport in micro-organisms and advises Parliament on science and technology.
- Sir Hans Krebs won the Nobel Prize in 1953 for his shared research into the complex sequence of metabolic chemical reactions known as the Krebs Cycle.
- Sir Claus Moser, a prominent statistician, directed the Central Statistics Office and served as Pro-Vice Chancellor of Oxford University.
- Sir Rudolf Peierls taught theoretical physics at Birmingham and Oxford and was involved in both the development of atomic weaponry and the Pugwash anti-nuclear movement.
- Max Perutz won the Nobel Prize in Chemistry in 1962 for shared research into the structure of haemoglobin which added to our understanding of diseases of the blood.
- Sir Nikolaus Pevsner brought new perspectives on the UK's architectural heritage to scholars and the wider public.
- Sir Karl Popper, a hugely influential political and social philosopher, was a critic of totalitarianism in all its forms.
- Sir Francis Simon pioneered research in thermodynamics and low-temperature physics at Oxford's Clarendon Laboratory.
- Albie Sachs was helped by SPSL in 1966, and again in 1988.
- Jack Mapanje a Malawian writer, poet and academic who emigrated to the UK in 1991

== Governance and Organisation ==
Cara has a Council of Management of twenty-five, recruited predominantly from the world of academia. The Council of Management meets twice annually whilst the Council's Finance & General Purposes Committee meets at least quarterly.

Professor Sir Malcolm Grant CBE is the President of Cara. Anne Lonsdale is Chair of the Council and Professor Sir Deian Hopkin is Vice-Chair. The Executive Director, Stephen Wordsworth, is charged with the day-to-day management of Cara and its staff.

== Current work ==
Cara runs several programmes.

The Fellowship Programme supports academics, often in immediate danger, to continue their work in safety. Cara works closely with the 112 universities in the Cara Scholars at Risk UK Universities Network, as well as other institutions in the UK and abroad, to secure placements for academics. Cara checks the applicants’ background, qualifications and references and negotiates the details of the higher education placement. Fee waivers and financial and in-kind support are secured by Cara, whilst any additional funding needed is allocated from the organisation's own resources. Cara assists in obtaining the appropriate visas for both the academic and, often, their families as well.

Many of the academics supported by Cara are committed to returning to their home country to rebuild their societies when conditions allow, employing the skills and connections they have obtained during their international academic placement. Cara also supports academics unable to return home because of continuing dangers by offering employment advice alongside training and education opportunities that enable academics to rebuild their careers in the UK.

Cara's Country Programmes provide support to academics who are either working on in their country despite the risks or who have been forced into exile in the surrounding region.

The Iraq Programme was launched in late 2006 in response to a targeted campaign of assassination and kidnap. Over 350 Iraqi academics were murdered between 2003 and 2012, with thousands driven into exile or internally displaced. At the height of the Iraq Programme, over 75 academics from 16 UK universities and 11 Iraqi universities collaborated on research of direct relevance to Iraq. Research focused on issues as diverse as: the impact of depleted uranium-contaminated soils; bias in primary/secondary school curricula and texts; the development of child mental capacities in the absence of existing services; use of mobile phone technologies to enhance public health services; and the status of female academics post-2003. Cara's Iraq Programme sought to ensure skills and expertise in Iraq and the wider region were developed rather than lost.

The Zimbabwe Programme was launched in 2009 in response to a marked increase in the number of academics fleeing Zimbabwe, amid reports of a dramatic decline in the quality of higher education. The Programme offered grants and fellowships to pay for vital equipment and supplies, and in 2012 established a ‘Virtual Lecture Hall’ at the University of Zimbabwe. This enabled Zimbabwean academics in exile and others to connect in real time with the colleges and faculties of health and veterinary sciences, to plug knowledge gaps, to improve standards of teaching and research and to facilitate increased networking and collaboration. In response to demand, a second, mobile, system was provided in October 2013. The equipment has been formally handed over to the University of Zimbabwe, and continues to be in regular use, providing a long-lasting legacy
