= Court of inquiry =

Court of inquiry may refer to:

- Court of Marine Inquiry - civil courts that investigate matters relating to ships
- Naval Board of Inquiry - US court of inquiry into a naval matter relating to ships
- Court of inquiry in Sri Lanka - an initial fact-finding inquiry by the Sri Lankan Armed Forces; similar to a non-summary inquiry by a magistrate
- Court of inquiry (Texas) - special proceeding within Texas' criminal law in which a district judge investigates a review to investigate whether an offense has been committed against the state's laws
