= Geschichte und Gesellschaft (journal) =

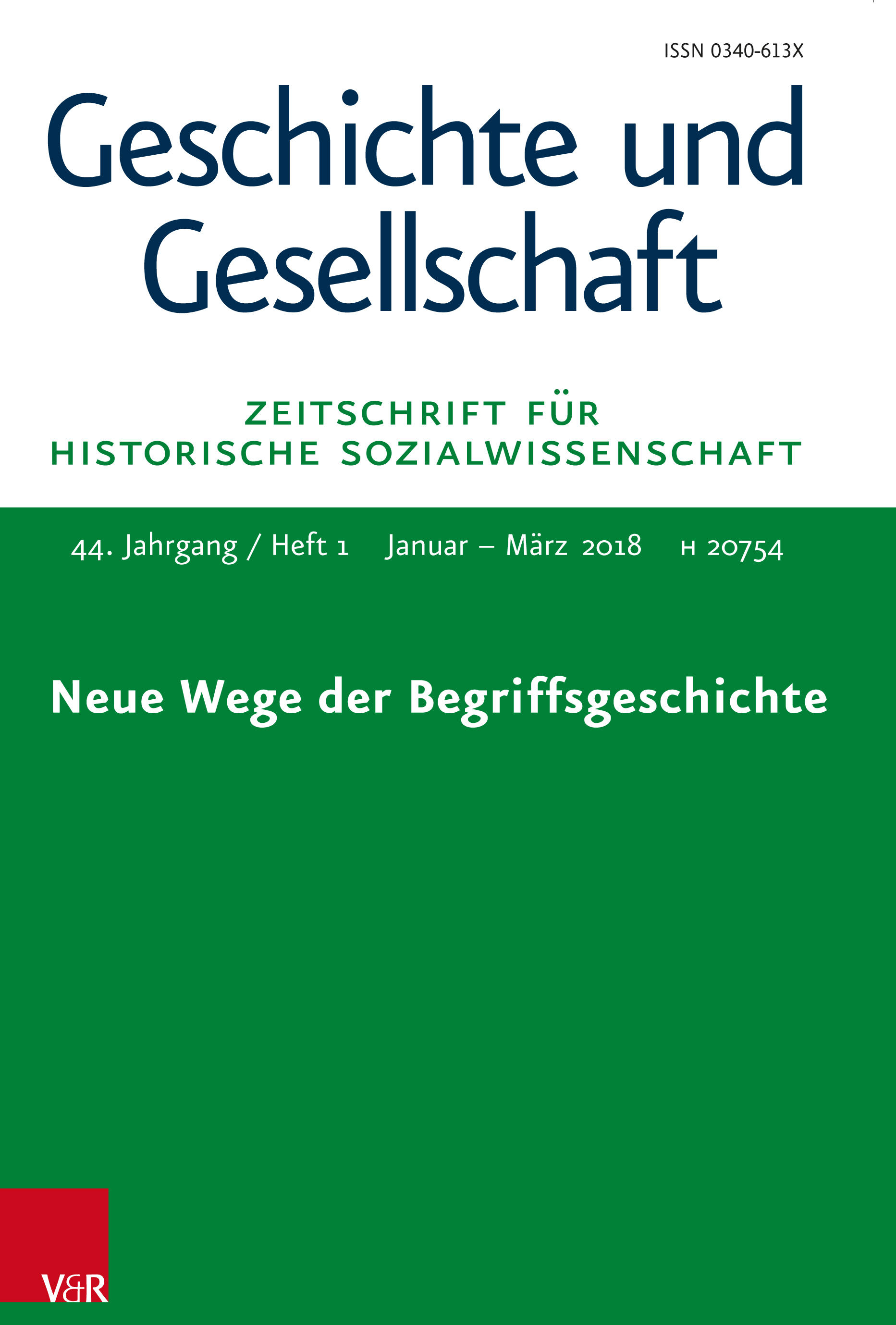
- Discipline: History
- Language: English, German

Publication details
- History: 1975-present
- Publisher: Vandenhoeck & Ruprecht (Germany)
- Frequency: Quarterly

Standard abbreviations
- ISO 4: Gesch. Ges.

Indexing
- ISSN: 0340-613X (print); 2196-9000 (web)
- LCCN: 75648589
- JSTOR: 0340613X
- OCLC no.: 2244423

Links
- Journal homepage

Geschichte und Gesellschaft: Zeitschrift fuer Historische Sozialwissenschaft (History and society. Journal of Historical Social Science) is a quarterly peer-reviewed academic journal covering the historical social sciences. It is published by Vandenhoeck & Ruprecht.

== Abstracting and indexing ==
The journal is abstracted and indexed in:

- Arts and Humanities Citation Index
- EBSCO databases
- International Bibliography of Periodical Literature
- International Bibliography of the Social Sciences
- Scopus
