= Erb's Covered Bridge =

Covered bridge in Lancaster County, Pennsylvania

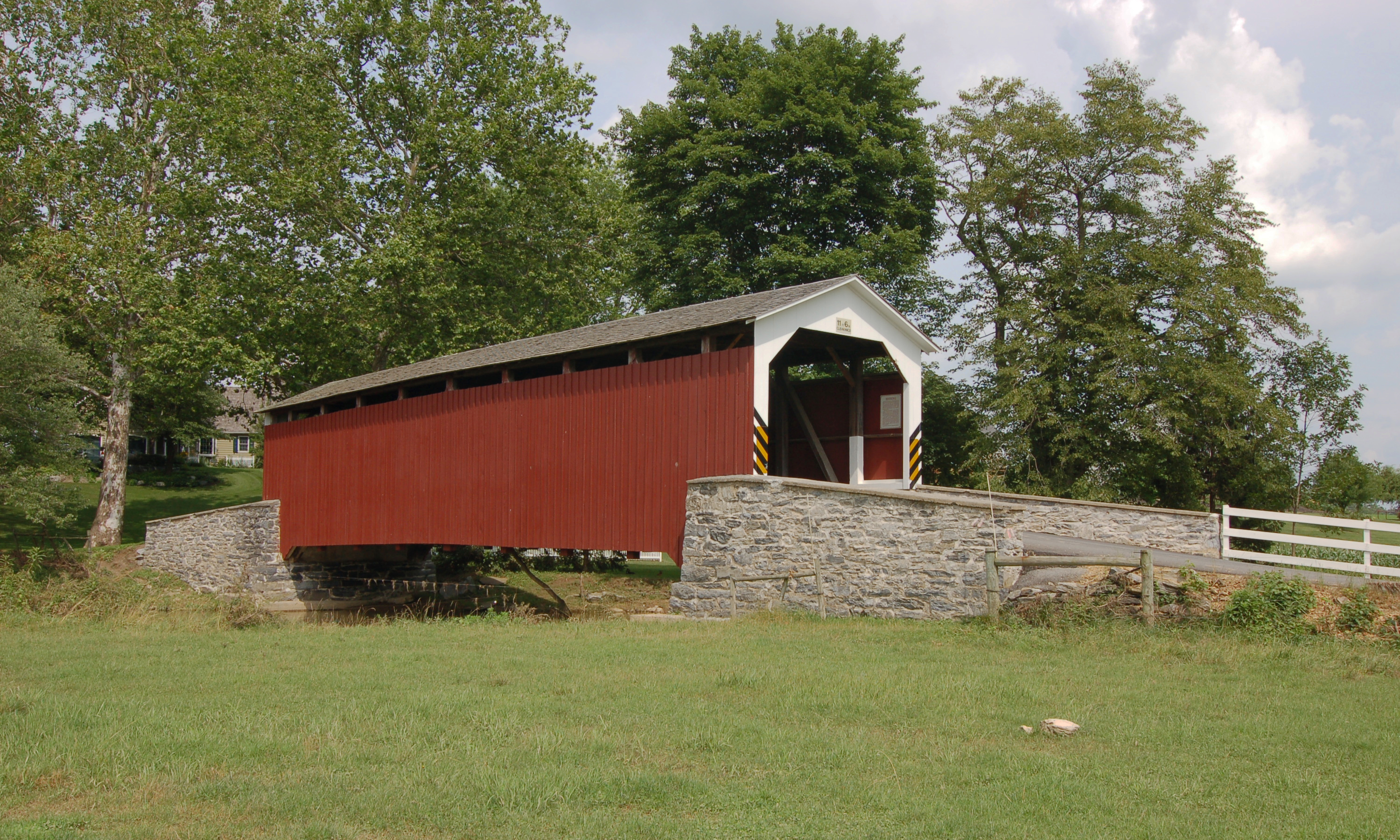
- Coordinates: 40°10′04″N 76°14′38″W
- Locale: Lancaster County, Pennsylvania, United States
- Official name: Hammer Creek #1 Bridge

Characteristics
- Design: single span, double Burr arch truss
- Total length: 70 feet (21.3 m)

History
- Constructed by: Unknown
- Construction start: 1849
- Construction end: Last rebuilt = 1887
- Erb's Covered Bridge
- U.S. National Register of Historic Places
- MPS: Covered Bridges of Lancaster County TR
- NRHP reference No.: 80003536
- Added to NRHP: December 10, 1980

Location
- Interactive map of Erb's Covered Bridge

The Erb's Covered Bridge is a covered bridge that spans Hammer Creek in Lancaster County, Pennsylvania, United States. A county-owned and maintained bridge, its official designation is the Hammer Creek #1 Bridge.

The bridge has a single span, wooden, double Burr arch trusses design with the addition of steel hanger rods. The deck is made from oak planks. It is painted red, the traditional color of Lancaster County covered bridges, on both the inside and outside. Both approaches to the bridge are painted in the traditional white color.

The bridge's WGCB Number is 38-36-34. In 1980 it was added to the National Register of Historic Places as structure number 80003536. It is located at 40°10′2.4″N 76°14′38.4″W (40.16733, -76.24400). The bridge can be found on Erb's Bridge Road north of Picnic Woods Road approximately 1 mile north of Pennsylvania route 772 and Rothsville, Pennsylvania.

== History ==
The bridge was originally built in 1849 for a cost of $700. It was built on the Erb family's tract of land in the farming region along Hammer Creek. The Erb family is one of the old-stock families of Lancaster County. Jacob came with his father from Switzerland in the year 1728, when four years of age, and resided at an early day near Hammer Creek, in Warwick township. About the year 1782 he removed to what is now Clay village, in Clay township, where he purchased five or six hundred acres of land, including the mill privileges at that point, and made a permanent settlement. He operated at Clay, and another one a little higher up, on Middle Creek, besides engaging in the arduous duties of pioneer agriculture. In religious affairs he belonged to the Mennonite persuasion until the breaking out of the Revolutionary war; but at that time feeling that the non-resistant principles of the society were detrimental to the preservation of the essential liberties of the people, he withdrew from the connection and warmly supported the struggle for national independence. After the close of the war he represented his district in the Legislature of the State. He was possessed of a deep reflective mind, good judgement, and a progressive spirit. He died in 1810, at the advanced age of 83 years. His wife bore him two sons and several daughters. The names of the former were John and Christian. The latter occupied the old family seat in Warwick during his life-time, and his descendants are still to be found in that locality.

In 1887 the bridge was rebuilt by John G. Bowman for $1744.

== Dimensions ==
- Length: 70 feet (21.3 m) span and 80 feet (24 m) total length
- Width: 13 feet 1 inch (3.99 m) clear deck and 15 feet (4.6 m) total width
- Overhead clearance: 11 feet 6 inches (3.51 m)
- Underclearance: 9 feet 6 inches (2.90 m)

== See also ==
- Burr arch truss
- List of Lancaster County covered bridges
