= Middle Creek (Cocalico Creek tributary) =

Coordinates: 40°09′52″N 76°13′57″W

Location
- Country: Lebanon and Lancaster Counties, Pennsylvania, United States

Physical characteristics
- Source
  - location: Schaefferstown, Pennsylvania
  - elevation: 318 feet (97 m)
- Mouth
  - location: Cocalico Creek at Rothsville, Pennsylvania
- Length: 15.5 mi (24.9 km)

Middle Creek is a 15.5-mile-long (24.9 km) tributary of Cocalico Creek in Lancaster County, Pennsylvania, in the United States.

== History ==
Since the 1930s, newspapers have reported that Middle Creek would be one of multiple creeks and streams that would be stocked with Brook trout by the Pennsylvania Fish Commission or Lancaster County for trout fishing season.

The Buck Hill Farm Covered Bridge once spanned Middle Creek prior to 1966.

== Geography ==
There is a dam between Hopeland and Kleinfeltersville creating a small lake in the Middle Creek Wildlife Management Area, also known as State Game Lands #46.

Middle Creek joins Cocalico Creek just upstream from Hammer Creek near the village of Rothsville.

== See also ==
- List of rivers of Pennsylvania
