= Conestoga Parkway =

Freeway in Ontario

Conestoga Parkway
- Kitchener–Waterloo Expressway
- Conestoga Parkway highlighted in red

Route information
- Maintained by Ministry of Transportation of Ontario
- Length: 20.7 km (12.9 mi)
- Existed: September 19, 1968–present

Major junctions
- West end: Trussler Road
- Highway 8 – Cambridge; Highway 7 – Guelph
- North end: 350 metres (383 yd) north of King Street North interchange

Location
- Country: Canada
- Province: Ontario
- Major cities: Kitchener, Waterloo

Highway system
- Ontario provincial highways; Current; Former; 400-series

The Conestoga Parkway, officially the Kitchener–Waterloo Expressway, is a controlled-access highway in the Canadian province of Ontario, located entirely within the Regional Municipality of Waterloo. The 20.7-kilometre (12.9 mi) route travels east and then north through the cities of Kitchener and Waterloo, and is connected to Highway 401 via Highway 8 and King Street East. The name Conestoga Parkway is not a formal designation, but rather a local name applied to the divided expressway portions of Highway 7, Highway 8 and Highway 85 through Kitchener and Waterloo. The Ministry of Transportation of Ontario (MTO), which built and maintains the route, refers to it as the Kitchener–Waterloo Expressway.

Originally conceived as a ring road in the 1940s, the concept evolved into a pair of at-grade four lane boulevards known as Henry Sturm Boulevard (east–west) and Dryden Boulevard (north–south), for which land was gradually purchased through the 1950s and into the early 1960s. The completion of Highway 401 between Toronto and Highway 8 in 1960 resulted in businesses relocating closer to it; consequently, traffic planners redesigned the boulevards into a continuous four lane expressway in 1962.

Construction of the Kitchener–Waterloo Expressway began in 1966 with the rebuilding of King Street East into a divided highway. This project also resulted in the construction of the interchange with the future expressway, which was named the Conestoga Parkway in 1967. The northern and western legs were built outwards from this interchange simultaneously over the following five years, opening in sections between 1968 and 1971. At that time, the route extended west to Fischer-Hallman Road and north to the southern interchange with King Street North. Two lane extensions opened in 1973 and 1977 to connect the parkway with New Hamburg and St. Jacobs, respectively. Portions of these were expanded to four lanes in the early 1990s. A series of projects saw the parkway completely rebuilt through its central section between the mid-1990s and early 2010s, including a concrete median barrier, additional lanes, and a new flyover ramp at Highway 8.

An ongoing but frequently delayed project to construct a new freeway between Kitchener and Guelph will see a new interchange built at the existing Wellington Street interchange, in addition to the numerous bridges that have already been lengthened in the vicinity. There is currently no projected timeline for the construction of completion of this project as of 2022.

== Route description ==
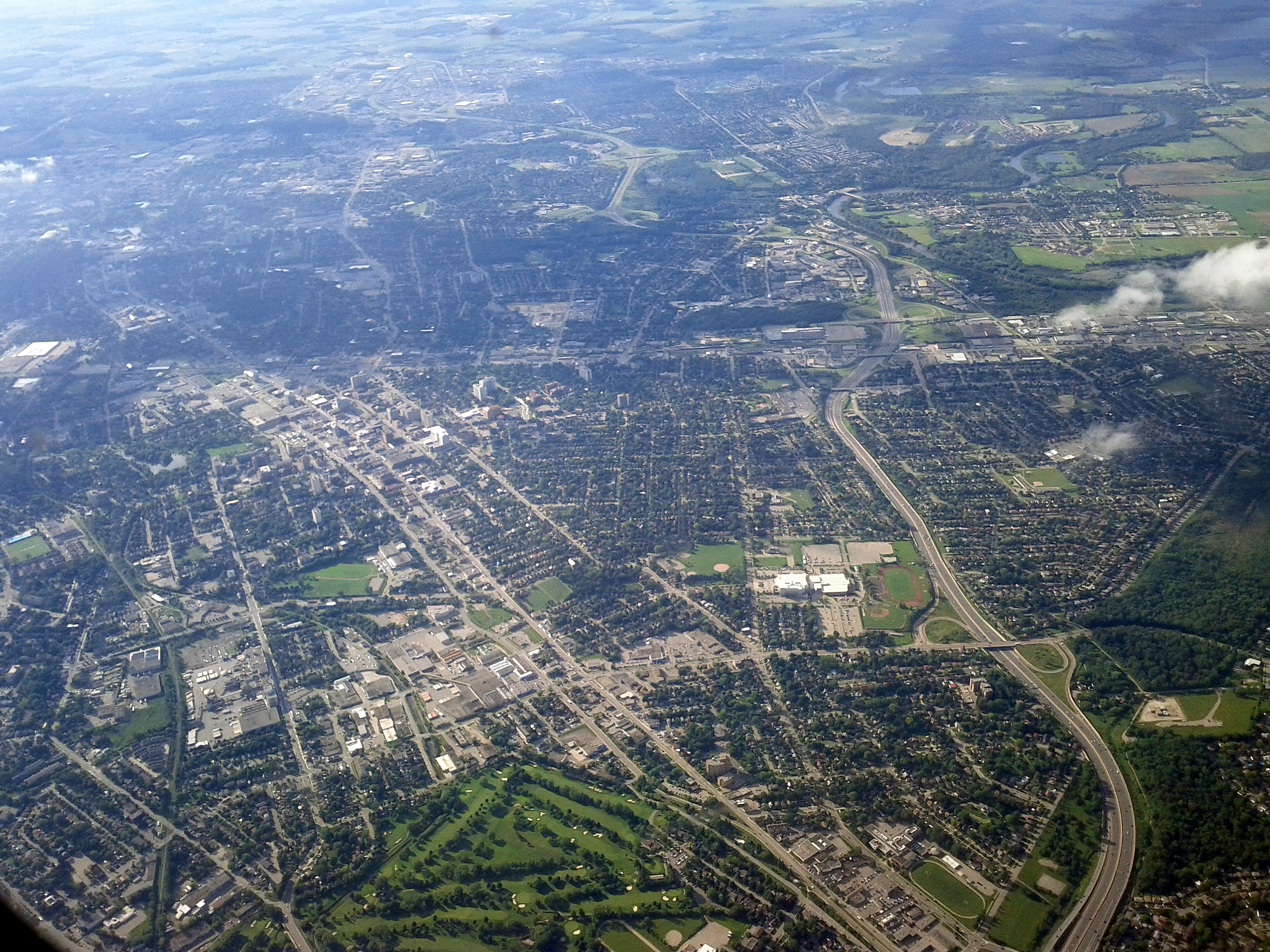
Aerial view of the Conestoga Parkway, with downtown Kitchener visible on the left

The Conestoga Parkway is a 20.7-kilometre (12.9 mi) controlled-access freeway serving the twin cities of Kitchener and Waterloo. The route, which forms the rough shape of a backwards "L", serves as the backbone of the two cities. As the concurrency of Highway 7 and Highway 8 enters the city of Kitchener as a freeway from the west, it takes on the name Conestoga Parkway at the Waterloo Regional Road 70 (Trussler Road) exit at the western edge of the city. The parkway travels east until Highway 8 diverges southeast toward Cambridge. Now carrying only the Highway 7 designation, the Conestoga Parkway curves northward. At the Frederick Street and Victoria Street interchange, Highway 7 exits the parkway and follows Victoria Street east toward Guelph; the parkway henceforth is signed as Highway 85 to its northern end, which lies approximately 750 metres (820 yd) north of the Waterloo city limits. The Conestoga Parkway is maintained by the Ministry of Transportation of Ontario (MTO), which officially refers to it as the Kitchener–Waterloo Expressway. The speed limit on the parkway is 90 kilometres per hour (55 mph) throughout its length.

=== Western leg ===
Interchange between the Conestoga Parkway (left to right) and Freeport Diversion

At the Kitchener city limits at Trussler Road the concurrency of Highway 7/8 continues west as a four lane freeway towards Stratford. Within Kitchener, the Conestoga Parkway consistently acts as the boundary for neighbourhoods to either side of it. Initially, it is sandwiched between the suburban residential neighbourhoods of Forest Heights and Laurentian West neighbourhoods, to the north and south respectively, as it travels east to Regional Road 58 (Fischer–Hallman Road). There the median switches from grass to a concrete barrier, and the parkway widens to six lanes. It passes north of the Sunrise Shopping Centre before once again bisecting residential neighbourhoods, namely Forest Hill and Meinzinger Park to the north and Laurentian Hills to the south.

Approaching the Regional Road 28 (Homer Watson Boulevard) interchange – which provides access to Regional Road 4 (Ottawa Street) – retail and light industry in the Alpine neighbourhood begin to flank the southern side of the Conestoga Parkway. It then crosses over the Canadian National Railways Huron Park spur, the adjacent ION LRT line, and Schneider Creek immediately west of an interchange with Regional Road 53 (Courtland Avenue). Now serving as the boundary between the residential neighbourhoods of Rockway to the north and Vanier to the south, the route curves north-northeast to reach an interchange with the Freeport Diversion (also known as the King Street Bypass or Highway 8 expressway).

=== Northern leg ===
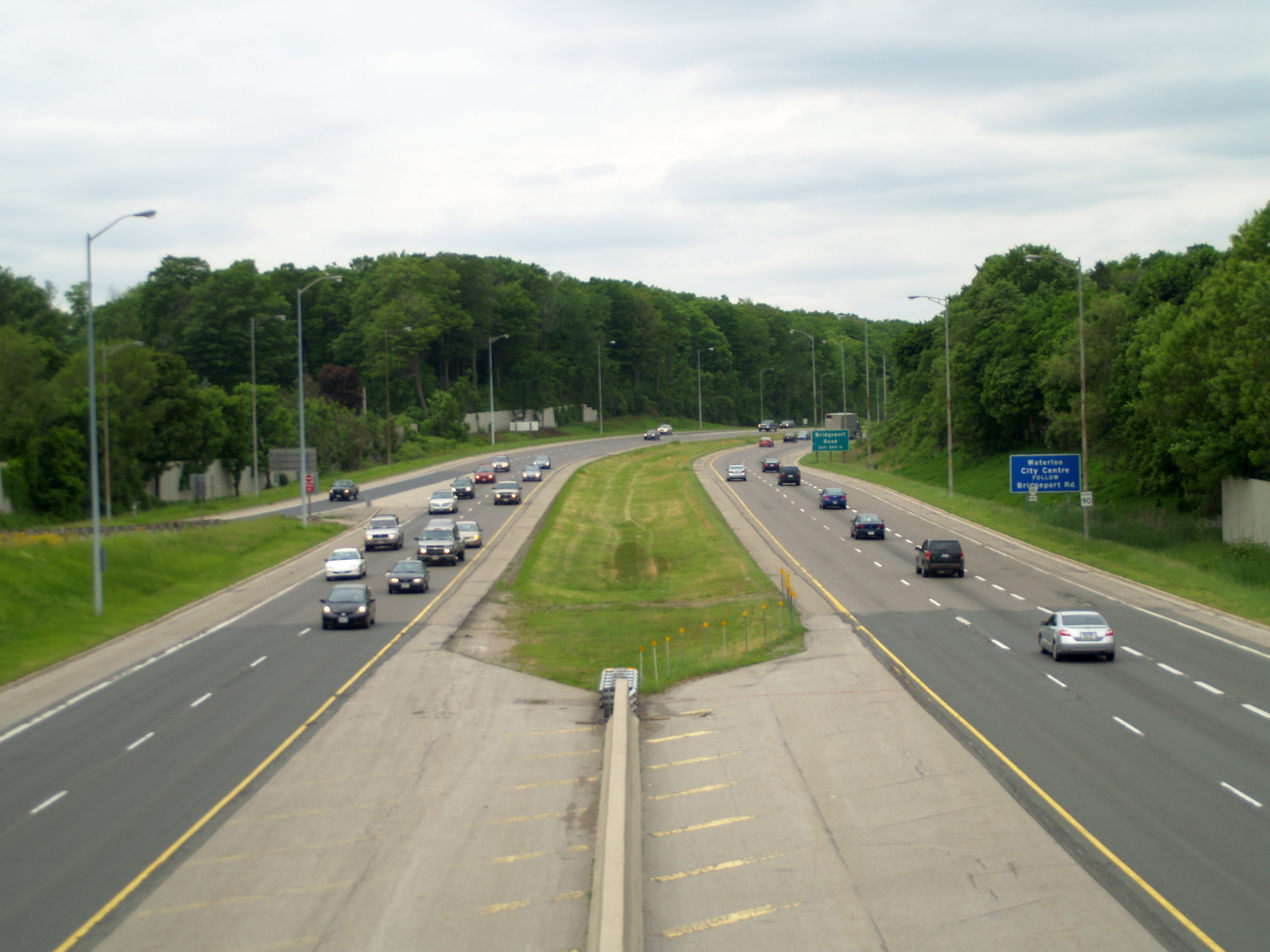
Facing northbound along the Conestoga Parkway at Lancaster Street, near the Kitchener–Waterloo boundary

The portion of the Conestoga Parkway that travels perpendicular to King Street East follows alongside Montgomery Creek. Now eight lanes wide, it passes over Weber Street and then curves north-northwest to avoid the Stanley Park Conservation Area, with the neighbourhoods of Eastwood to the west and Stanley Park to the southeast. The parkway follows the former alignment of Edna Street north to Frederick Street, with the neighbourhoods of Auditorium and Central Frederick to the west and Rosemount to the east. It briefly swerves northwards, passing under Frederick Street, Victoria Street, and the Kitchener GO line in quick succession. An interchange serves both Frederick Street and Victoria Street via the parallel roads of Regional Road 62 (Edna Street) and Regional Road 61 (Bruce Street); an interchange with Wellington Street follows soon thereafter. Due to the close proximity of these two interchanges, the Conestoga Parkway utilizes a brief local–express system for approximately 1.7 kilometres (1.1 mi).

Now passing through light industry in the Northward neighbourhood, the Conestoga Parkway makes a broad curve to the west to avoid the Grand River and meets Regional Road 29 (Lancaster Street), which features a partial interchange. The median barrier ends immediately after, and a grass median begins. To the south is the neighbourhood of Fairfield, while Bridgeport lies to the north. The route gradually curves back to the north and enters the city of Waterloo at Regional Road 9 (Bridgeport Road), with which there is an interchange.

Highway 85 facing south at the northern end of the Conestoga Parkway

The Conestoga Parkway enters Waterloo with the suburban neighbourhood of Lincoln Heights to the west and greenfields and Betchel Park to the east. After 1.5 kilometres (0.93 mi), it crosses Laurel Creek and encounters an interchange with Regional Road 57 (University Avenue) before curving gradually to the west-northwest. With the neighbourhoods of Lincoln West to the south and Foxhunt to the north, the parkway encounters the first of two interchanges with Regional Road 15 (King Street North); Conestoga Mall lies to the northeast. It becomes parallel to Forwell Creek as it curves back northward, after which the parkway travels parallel to and east of the Waterloo Central Railway for the remainder of its length. An interchange with Regional Road 50 (Northfield Drive) also carries the ION LRT line over the route as it travels through an area of light industry. Just prior to the second interchange with King Street North, the Conestoga Parkway exits Waterloo into the township of Woolwich. Both the parkway and Highway 85 end approximately 350 metres (1,150 ft) north of King Street North, after which the four lane freeway narrows and is known as Waterloo Regional Road 85.

== History ==
=== Planning and construction ===
Ottawa Street and Henry Strum Boulevard in 1961, at the present site of the Homer Watson Boulevard interchange

Although the concept of a ring road around Kitchener and Waterloo originated from the Kitchener-Waterloo and Suburban Planning Board in 1948, actual consideration was not given to it until it was recommended by a 1961 traffic study. By then, the opening of Highway 401 was attracting business away from the rapidly growing twin cities. Land was gradually purchased over the intervening years and picked up considerably when plans for the expressway system were first raised in late 1962. The ring road prior to this point had evolved to a proposed pair of east–west and north–south four lane boulevards known as Henry Strum Boulevard and Dryden Boulevard. However, Kitchener planning director Bill Thompson changed this to a single controlled-access highway. The Department of Highways had already begun construction in the fall of 1961 on the Freeport Diversion, providing a new divided crossing of the Grand River along Highway 8. The diversion, connecting with King Street south of the Grand River and at Fergus Avenue, was completed in 1963.

The provincial government reached a funding arrangement with Kitchener and Waterloo to cover 75% of the expected C$22 million ($211 million in 2023 dollars). cost, and officially announced the Kitchener–Waterloo Expressway on May 21, 1964. The province eventually took over authority for the entire project in August 1965. Construction began in February 1966 with the awarding of a C$3 million ($26.9 million in 2023 dollars). contract to rebuild 2.7 kilometres (1.7 mi) of King Street into a four lane divided highway from Fairway Road (renamed from Block Line Road in 1965) to Doon Road, including the half cloverleaf interchange that would serve the western and northern legs of the expressway system. A ground-breaking ceremony was held in the fall of that year, with dignitaries taking turns driving a bulldozer. In anticipation of the long-term construction, Highway 8 was redirected along Fairway Road, Mill Street (now Vanier Drive) and the short section of Henry Sturm Boulevard that was constructed from Ottawa Street and Highland Road to Mill Street. The reconstruction of King Street was completed and opened in November 1967.

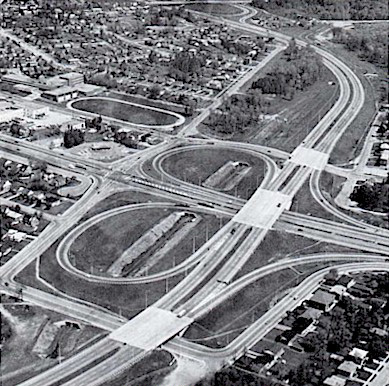
Interchange between Conestoga Parkway and Freeport Diversion in 1970, shortly after opening

The Kitchener–Waterloo Expressway was unofficially renamed the Conestoga Parkway in January 1967 by a joint committee of the two cities. A shortlist of 12 publicly-submitted names was prepared, and included Mackenzie King, John Patrick, Eby-Erb (early Mennonite settlers), Dan Detweiller (a founder of the Ontario hydroelectric system), Frederick Banting, Centennial, Pioneer, Grand Valley, Golden Triangle, The Kingsway, and Conestoga. The name, a reference to the Mennonite conestoga wagon used by early settlers, was chosen unanimously by the committee.

On the northern leg of the parkway, early works construction along Edna Street, including the removal of several dozen homes, began in 1966, and tenders were called for construction of the route from King Street to Frederick Street in September. Full construction on the C$1.9 million ($16.5 million in 2023 dollars). contract began in April 1967. It was completed and opened to traffic on September 19, 1968. Another contract, to build the parkway from Frederick Street and Bridgeport Road, was awarded that month for C$5.1 million ($42.6 million in 2023 dollars)., with construction beginning in October. On the western leg of the parkway, construction began in October 1967 on a C$3.6 million ($31.2 million in 2023 dollars). contract to build a 2.9-kilometre (1.8 mi) segment of the parkway from King Street to west of Homer Watson Boulevard. This section, which was built along the alignment of Henry Strum Boulevard, was opened to traffic between Courtland Avenue and King Street on November 25, 1968.

Work continued on the Conestoga Parkway into the early 1970s. On the northern leg, the segment under construction between Frederick Street and Bridgeport Road was completed and opened on October 5 or 6, 1970. Just over a month later, on November 13, the first portion of the expressway within Waterloo was opened ceremoniously by Minister of Highways George Gomme. Construction of this section, through undeveloped farmland between Bridgeport Road and the southern interchange with King Street North, took place beginning in 1969. On the western leg, a section between Courtland Avenue and Fischer-Hallman Drive opened on September 1, 1971, completing the Kitchener–Waterloo Expressway project.

By this time, construction was underway on a new two lane alignment of Highway 7/8, first announced in 1963, to connect the New Hamburg Diversion with the Conestoga Parkway at Fischer-Hallman Drive. It opened on August 13, 1973, bypassing the community of Baden. To the north, construction of a two lane alignment of Highway 85 to connect the Conestoga Parkway, at the southern intersection of King Street North, with the St. Jacobs Bypass began in 1974. The extension, which featured an at-grade intersection with Northfield Road and a grade-separation with the northern King Street North, was opened in late August, 1977.

=== Since completion ===
As each section of the Conestoga Parkway opened, the DHO moved portions of Highways 7, 8 and 85 onto it. By 1972, the current configuration of the three highways was established. However, in 1980 or 1981, Highway 85 was renumbered as Highway 86. It remained as such until the spring of 2003, when several highways in Ontario were renumbered to improve route number continuity and aid navigation. Among them was the renumbering of Highway 86 back to Highway 85, restoring the original numbering scheme of the parkway.

The two lane segment of Highway 7/8 from Fischer-Hallman Road west to Baden was originally slated to be twinned to four lanes in the 1980s, but the project was put off for a decade. Early works tree clearing got underway in 1991 before being put on hold for archeological excavations. Construction began to widen the route as far west as Waterloo Regional Road 12 (Queen Street), south of Petersburg, on July 6, 1992, with a planned completion by August 1993.

The Conestoga Parkway interchange with the Freeport Diversion. The flyover was constructed to remedy a half-cloverleaf infamous for weaving.

The lack of a median barrier between the opposing lanes of the parkway led to numerous crossover collisions; between May 1990 and July 1993, eight deaths were directly attributed to vehicles crossing the grass median and striking vehicles in the opposing lane head on. Following the death of Laurie Brain on April 8, 1990, a coroners jury on October 9, 1991, recommended several immediate improvements to the parkway, including the installation of a median barrier as well as lowering the speed limit from 100 kilometres per hour (62 mph) to 90 kilometres per hour (56 mph). The speed limit was reduced to 90 km/h on January 11, 1994, while construction to install a barrier between Frederick Street and Lancaster Street began in July 1994. The work, which also included the construction of storm drainage, was completed by the summer of 1995. Construction of a barrier between Homer Watson Boulevard and Frederick Street began in July 1997, and was completed by November.

The collector–express section of the Conestoga serving the interchanges with Highway 7/Victoria Street and Wellington Street

In the early 1990s, the provincial government announced plans to widen the Conestoga Parkway and Freeport Diversion, as well as to improve the interchange between the two. The project was broken into several phases, and included rebuilding the Ottawa Street and Franklin Street overpasses. Construction began in August or September 1998 to widen the Conestoga Parkway from four to six lanes between Courtland Avenue and King Street, from four to eight lanes between King Street and Ottawa Street, and from four to six lanes between Ottawa Street and Frederick Street. This stage of the project was completed in July 2000.

The expansion of Highway 8 from four lanes to eight lanes between the Conestoga Parkway and Fergus Avenue was originally scheduled to begin in 2001, but was delayed as businesses along Weber Street fought expropriation. Construction instead began in April 2002, which involved shifting one of the retaining walls further north and a new Franklin Street bridge to accommodate the eight lane cross-section freeway. Included with this project was a reconstruction of the bottle-necked interchange of the Conestoga Parkway and Highway 8, including a new flyover ramp from westbound Conestoga Parkway to eastbound Highway 8 to replace one of the two loop ramps, and realignment of the northbound to eastbound ramp. Both were completed and opened on June 11, 2004.

Construction began in 2012 to widen the parkway to six lanes from east of Courtland Avenue to west of Fischer-Hallman Road, including the installation of a median barrier. The C$130 million project was completed in 2016.

== Future ==
Long term plans have called for the construction of a freeway link between Kitchener and Guelph, linking the Conestoga Parkway with the Hanlon Expressway (Highway 6). Although proposed in the 1980s, construction did not begin until 2015. Opposition arose due to the new alignment of this Highway 7 freeway passing through environmentally sensitive lands. In particular, the $25 million cost of the interchange between the new freeway and the Conestoga Parkway; the high cost is partly due to land acquisition to accommodate the proposed flyover ramps. This represents a quarter of the projected C$100 million budget for the total Highway 7 project. The Victoria Street overpass was demolished overnight on February 23–24, 2018, and was replaced with a new structure that reopened to traffic on October 28; the new bridge is longer and has a higher elevation to accommodate the future ramps between Highway 7 and the Conestoga Parkway.

== Exit list ==
The following table lists the major junctions along the Conestoga Parkway, as noted by the Ministry of Transportation of Ontario. The entire route is located in the Regional Municipality of Waterloo. All exits are unnumbered.

Location	km	mi	Destinations	Notes
Kitchener	0.0	0.0	Highway 7 west / Highway 8 – Stratford	Kitchener city limits; continuation of Highway 7 / Highway 8
Kitchener	0.0	0.0	Regional Road 70 (Trussler Road)	
Kitchener	2.9	1.8	Regional Road 58 (Fischer-Hallman Road)	
Kitchener	5.5	3.4	Regional Road 28 (Homer Watson Boulevard); Regional Road 4 (Ottawa Street)	
Kitchener	6.8	4.2	Regional Road 53 (Courtland Avenue)	
Kitchener	8.2	5.1	Highway 8 east (Freeport Diversion) to Highway 401	Eastern end of Highway 8 concurrency
Kitchener	9.5	5.9	Regional Road 4 (Ottawa Street)	
Kitchener	11.0	6.8	Highway 7 east (Victoria Street / Regional Road 55); Frederick Street (Regional Road 6) Highway 85 begins	Eastern end of Highway 7 designation; Highway 85 southern terminus; access to Victoria Street and Frederick Street via Bruce Street (northbound) and Edna Street (southbound)
Kitchener	11.3	7.0	Wellington Street	Future realignment of Highway 7 as part of the proposed Kitchener–Guelph freeway
Kitchener	12.8	8.0	Regional Road 29 (Lancaster Street)	Southbound exit and northbound entrance
Waterloo	13.7	8.5	Regional Road 9 (Bridgeport Road)	
Waterloo	15.2	9.4	Regional Road 57 (University Avenue)	
Waterloo	17.6	10.9	Regional Road 15 (King Street North)	
Waterloo	18.9	11.7	Regional Road 50 (Northfield Drive)	
Woolwich Township	20.4	12.7	Regional Road 15 (King Street North)	
Woolwich Township	20.7	12.9	Highway 85 ends Regional Road 85 north	Highway 85 northern terminus; continues as Regional Road 85
1.000 mi = 1.609 km; 1.000 km = 0.621 mi: Concurrency terminus; Incomplete access; Proposed; Route transition

== See also ==
- 400-series highways
