= Buck Hill Farm Covered Bridge =

Covered bridge in Pennsylvania, US

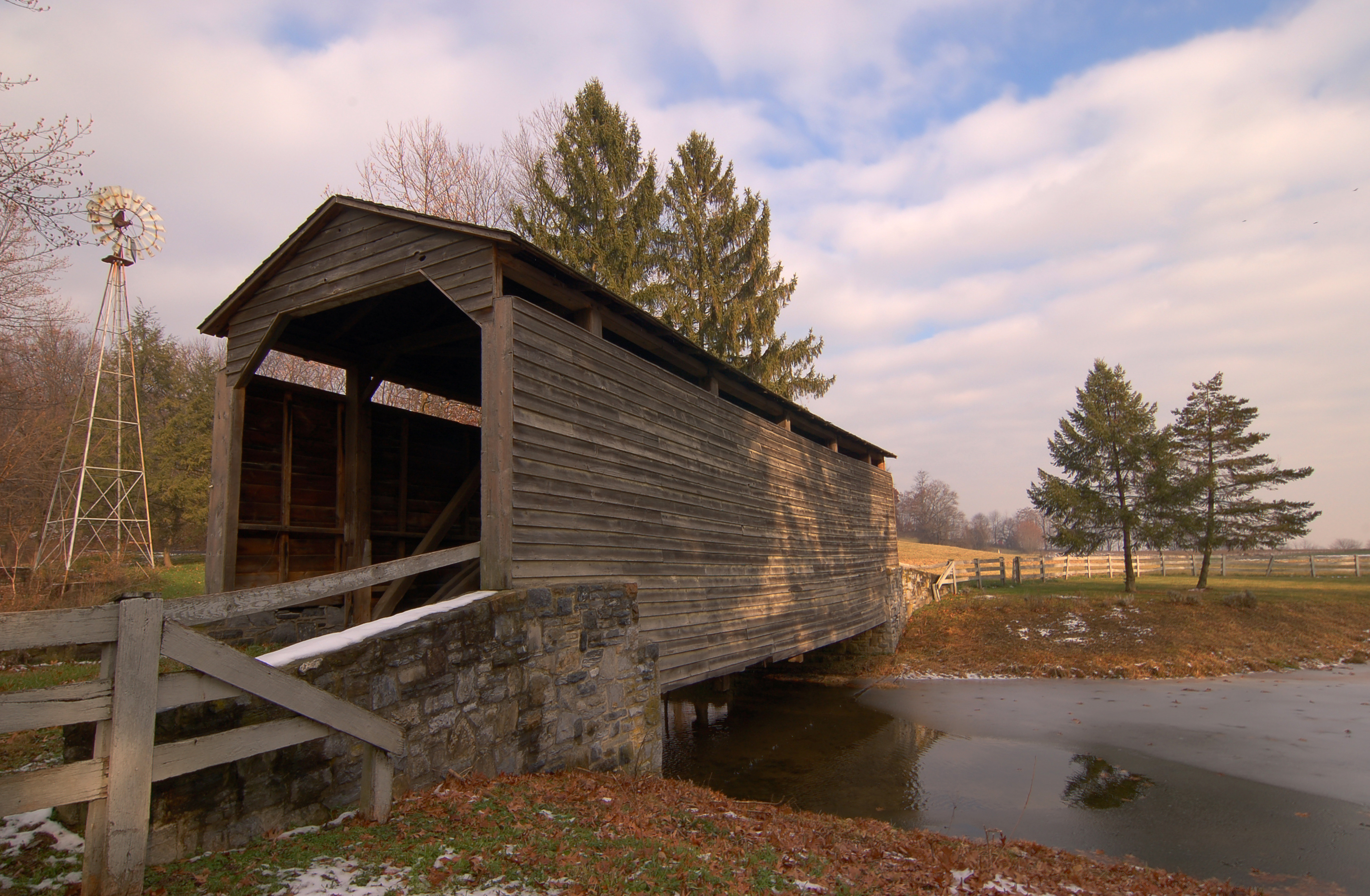
- Coordinates: 40°7′55.5″N 76°18′2.5″W
- Crosses: Farm pond inlet
- Locale: Lancaster, Pennsylvania, United States
- Other name(s): Abram Hess' Mill, Eichelberger's, Eichelberger's Stone
- Maintained by: Private owner
- WGCB Number: 38-36-15

Characteristics
- Design: Burr Arch-Truss
- Total length: 58 ft (18 m)
- Width: 15 ft (4.6 m)

History
- Constructed by: Theodore Cochran
- Built: 1825
- Rebuilt: 1844

Statistics
- Daily traffic: No
- Buck Hill Farm Covered Bridge
- U.S. National Register of Historic Places
- MPS: Covered Bridges of Lancaster County TR
- NRHP reference No.: 80003528
- Added to NRHP: December 10, 1980

Location
- Interactive map of Buck Hill Farm Covered Bridge

The Buck Hill Covered Bridge, Eichelberger's Covered Bridge, or Abram Hess' Mill Bridge is a burr arch-truss style covered bridge located in Lancaster County, Pennsylvania, United States. It is located on the Buck Hill Farm's pond on private property.

The bridge's WGCB Number is 38-36-15. In 1980 it was added to the National Register of Historic Places as structure number 80003528. It is located on private property.

The bridge is one of only 3 covered bridges in the county with horizontal side boards.

== History ==
The original build date and builder of the covered bridge is unknown. However, it was probably built around 1825 to provide access to Abram Hess's store. In 1844 the bridge was sold to George Eichelberger. That same year the bridge was heavily damaged in a flood and had to be repaired. It was rebuilt by Theodore D. Cochran at a cost of $799. The bridge was moved, in 1966, to the Buck Hill Farm, a private farm located in Warwick Township 1.2 kilometers (0.75 mi) south of Kissel Hill on Pennsylvania Route 501.

The bridge spanned Middle Creek.

== See also ==
- List of bridges on the National Register of Historic Places in Pennsylvania
- List of covered bridges in Lancaster County, Pennsylvania
- National Register of Historic Places listings in Lancaster County, Pennsylvania
