= Jacob Keller Farm =

Historic house in Pennsylvania, United States

- U.S. National Register of Historic Places
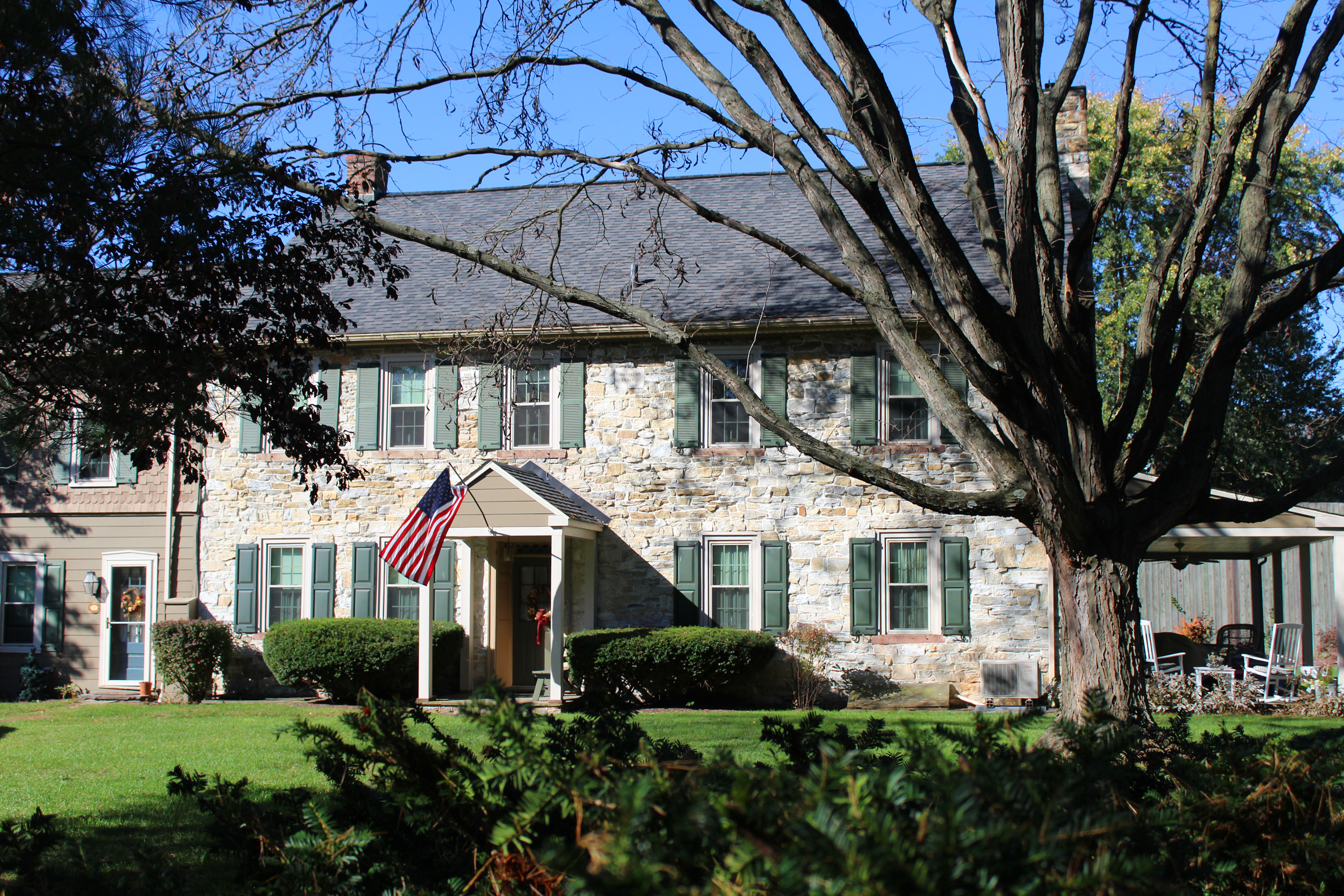
- Jacob Keller farmhouse, 2020

- Location within Pennsylvania Location within the United States
- Location: 900 Rettew Mill Road, Ephrata Township, Pennsylvania
- Coordinates: 40°10′13″N 76°12′21″W
- Area: 2.9 acres (1.2 ha)
- Built: 1814, 1856
- Built by: Jacob Keller
- Architectural style: Federal, Germanic Style
- NRHP reference No.: 86001679
- Added to NRHP: July 17, 1986

The Jacob Keller Farm, also known as the Covered Bridge Inn-Bed and Breakfast, is an historic home and grist mill located in Ephrata Township, Lancaster County, Pennsylvania, United States.

It was listed on the National Register of Historic Places in 1986.

== History and architectural features ==
The original section of the house was built in 1814, and is a 2 1/2-story, five-bay wide, limestone, Federal and Germanic-style dwelling. A two-story, three-bay frame addition was built circa 1856. The Rettew's Mill or Aaron Roller Mill is a stone mill built sometime around 1814. The property also includes the stone foundation of a barn that was also built circa 1814.
