= Hammer Creek =

Coordinates: 40°09′41″N 76°13′57″W

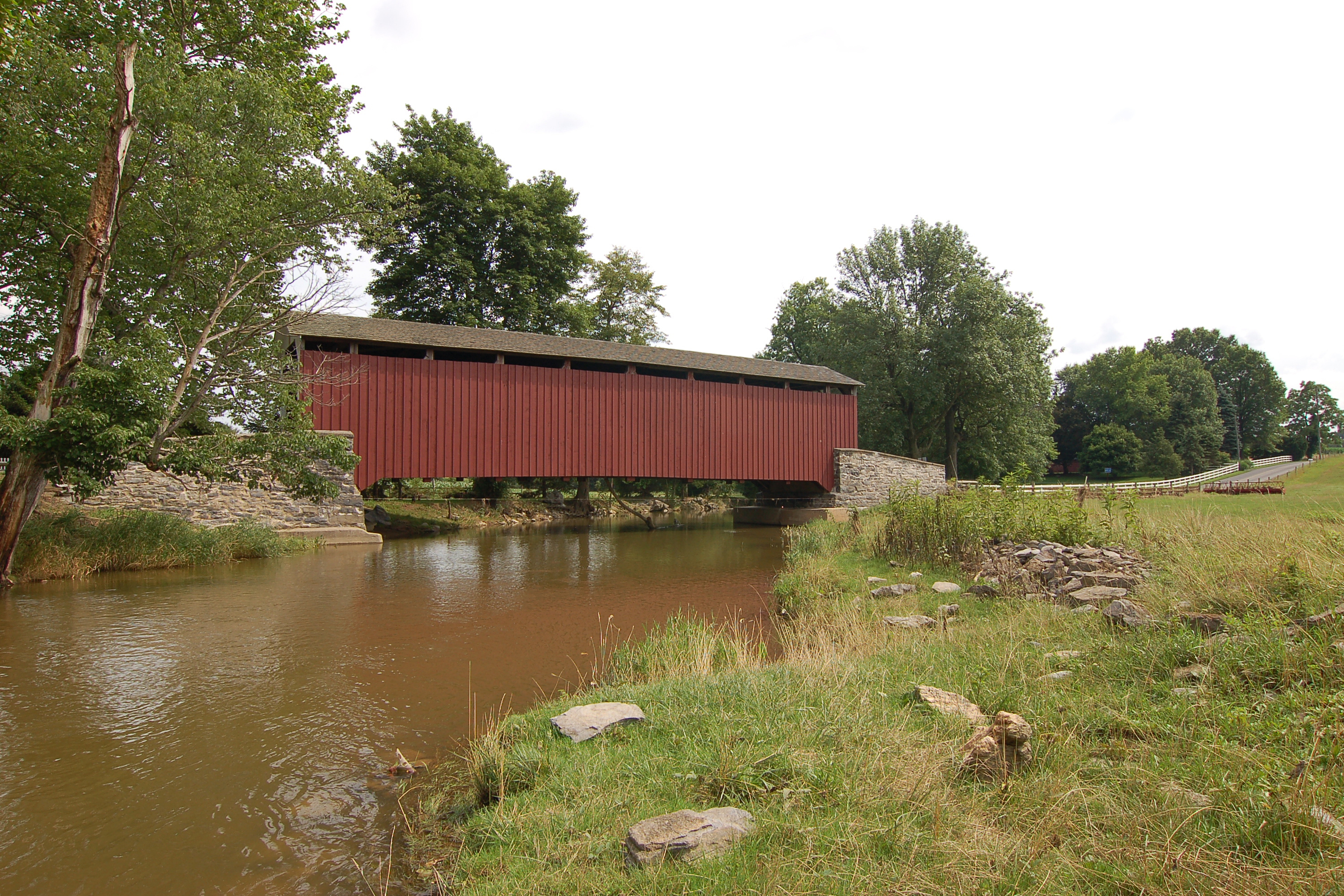
- Erb's Covered Bridge over Hammer Creek in Lancaster County, Pennsylvania

Location
- Country: Lebanon and Lancaster counties, Pennsylvania, United States

Physical characteristics
- Source
  - location: Cornwall, Pennsylvania
  - elevation: 308 feet (94 m)
- Mouth
  - location: Cocalico Creek at Rothsville, Pennsylvania
- Length: 19.2 mi (30.9 km)
- Basin size: 40 mi^{2} (100 km^{2})

Hammer Creek is a 19.2-mile-long (30.9 km) tributary of Cocalico Creek in Lebanon and Lancaster counties, Pennsylvania, United States.

Hammer Creek is dammed to form Speedwell Forge Lake before joining the Cocalico Creek downstream by the confluence of Middle Creek near the village of Rothsville.

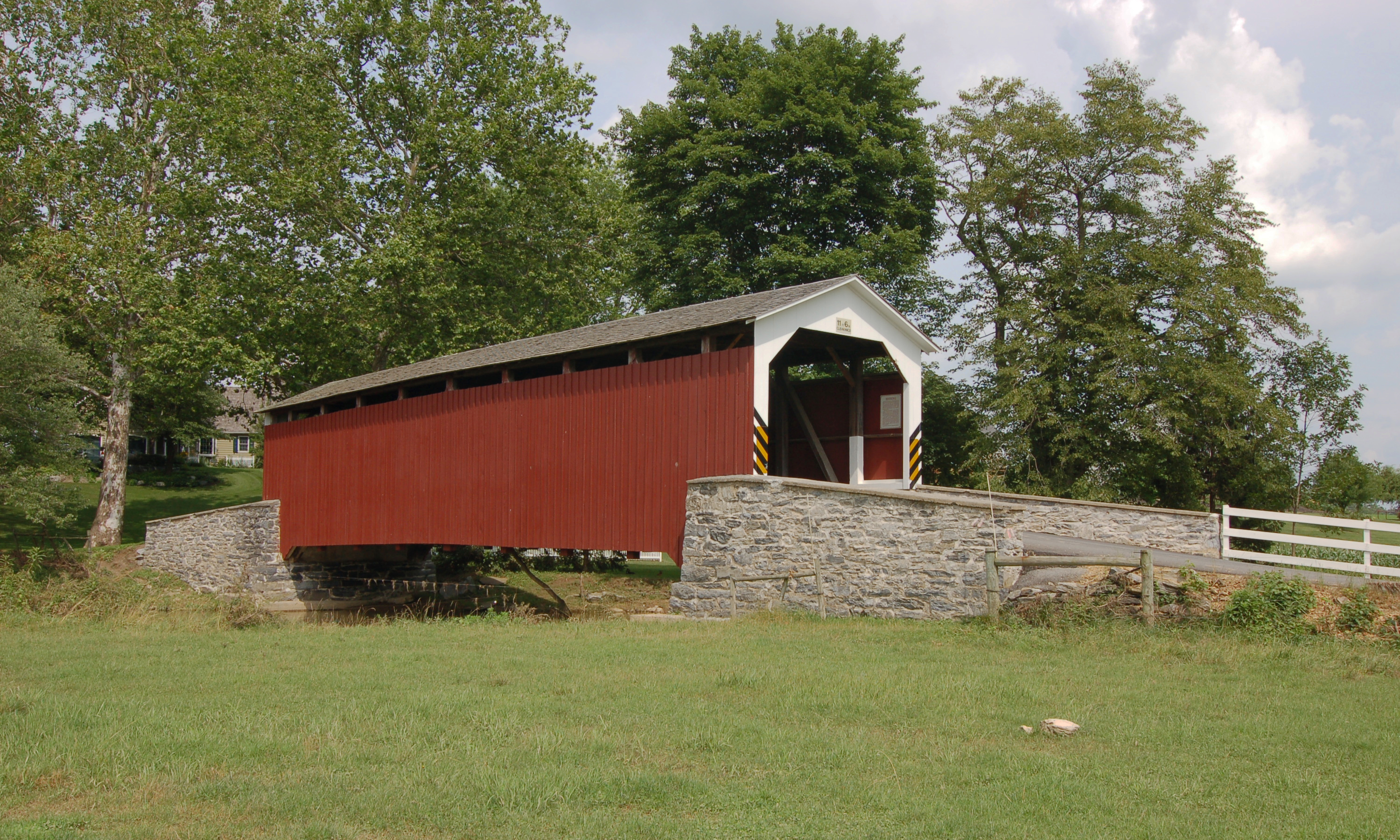
Erb's Covered Bridge

== Variant names ==
According to the Geographic Names Information System, Hammer Creek has also been known historically as Hammar Creek.

== Bridges ==
- Brunnerville Road Bridge over Hammer Creek
- Erb's Covered Bridge

== Notable people ==
- Bishop Benjamin Eby (1785–1853)

== See also ==
- List of rivers of Pennsylvania
- John Fass and the Hammer Creek Press
