= Ephrata Township, Pennsylvania =

Township in Pennsylvania, US

Coordinates: 40°10′00″N 76°10′59″W

- Township
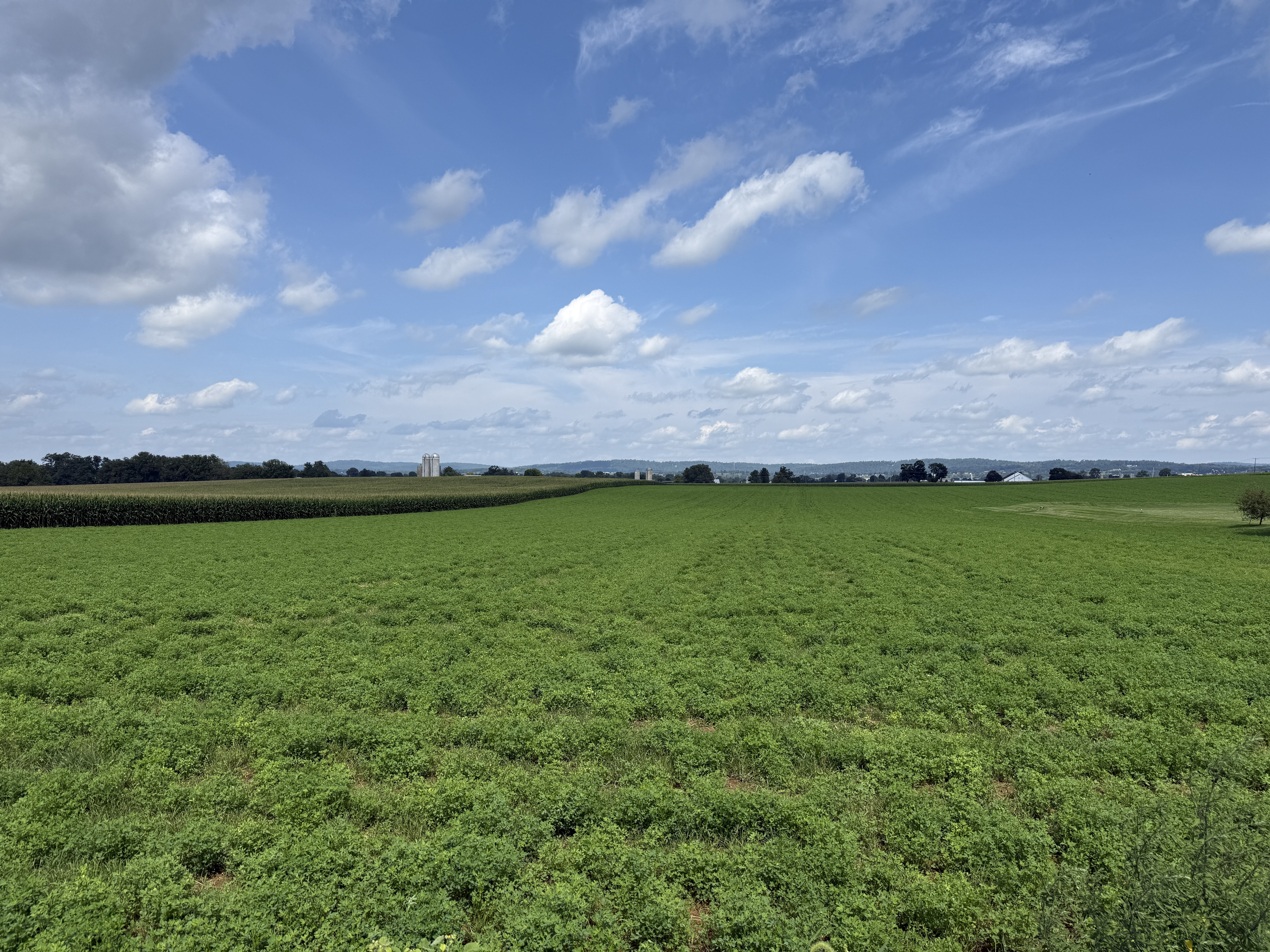
- Farmland in Ephrata Township

- Seal

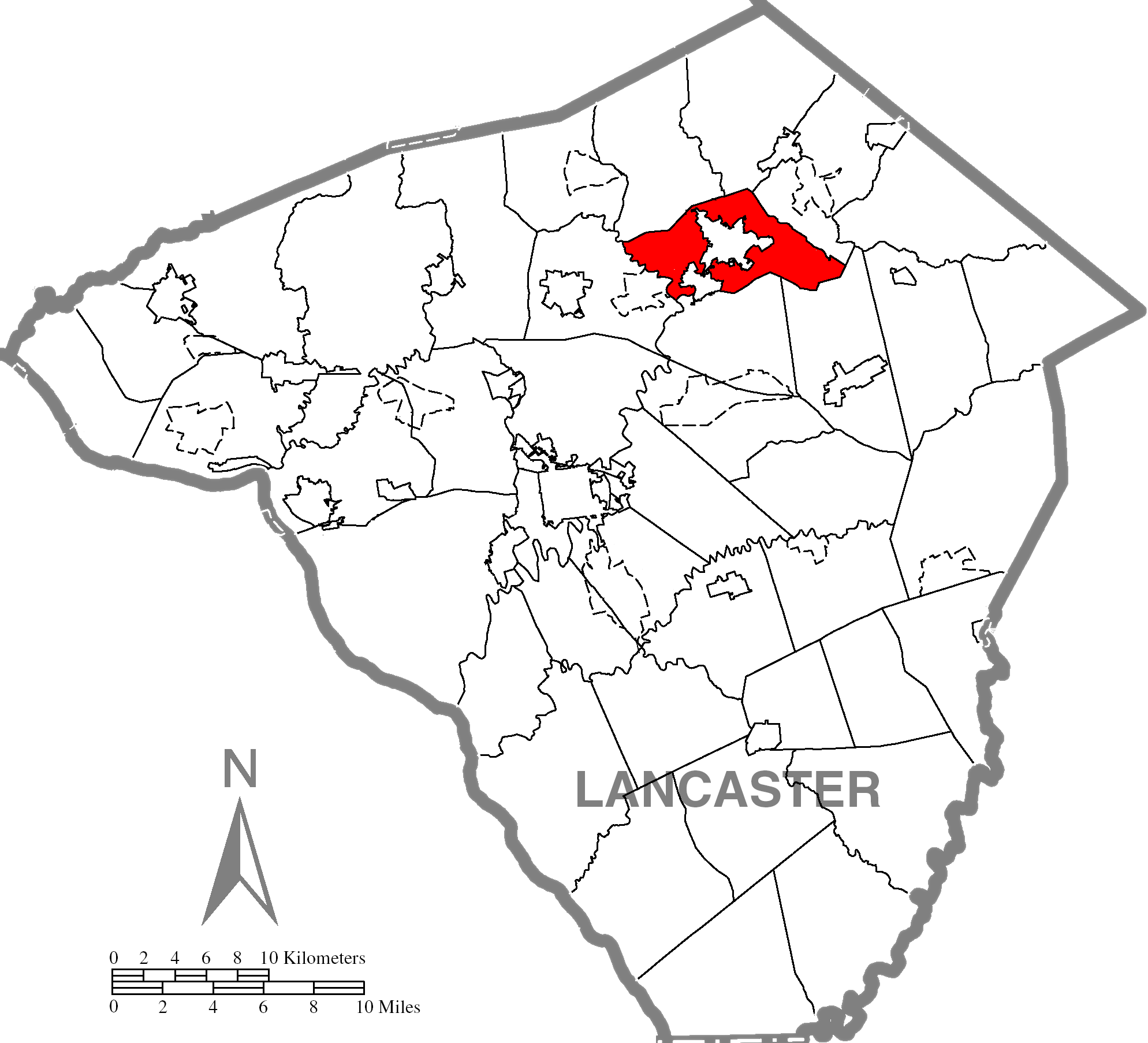
- Map of Lancaster County, Pennsylvania highlighting Ephrata Township

- Map of Lancaster County, Pennsylvania
- Country: United States
- State: Pennsylvania
- County: Lancaster
- Settled: 1732
- Incorporated: 1838

Government
  - Type: Board of Supervisors

Area
  - Total: 16.43 sq mi (42.55 km^{2})
  - Land: 16.24 sq mi (42.06 km^{2})
  - Water: 0.19 sq mi (0.49 km^{2})

Population (2020)
  - Total: 10,391 ▲
  - Estimate (2021): 10,688
  - Density: 629/sq mi (242.8/km^{2})
- Time zone: UTC-5 (Eastern (EST))
  - Summer (DST): UTC-4 (EDT)
- Area code: 717
- FIPS code: 42-071-23840
- Website: www.ephratatownship.org

Ephrata Township is a township in northeastern Lancaster County, Pennsylvania, United States. The population was 10,391 at the 2020 census.

== History ==
The Erb's Covered Bridge, Jacob Keller Farm, Keller's Covered Bridge, Hibshman Farm, and Peter and Catherine Reyer Farmhouse are listed on the National Register of Historic Places.

== Geography ==
According to the United States Census Bureau, the township has a total area of 16.2 square miles (42 km^{2}), all land. It surrounds the borough of Ephrata, a separate municipality. The borough of Akron borders the southwestern part of the township. Unincorporated communities within the township itself include Hahnstown and parts of Hinkletown and Frysville, all in the eastern part of the township.

== Demographics ==
Historical population
Census	Pop.	Note	%±
2000	8,026		—
2010	9,400		17.1%
2020	10,391		10.5%
2021 (est.)	10,688		2.9%
U.S. Decennial Census

At the 2000 census there were 8,026 people, 2,691 households, and 2,101 families living in the township. The population density was 494.5 inhabitants per square mile (190.9/km^{2}). There were 2,747 housing units at an average density of 169.2 per square mile (65.3/km^{2}). The racial makeup of the township was 96.19% White, 0.44% African American, 0.07% Native American, 1.82% Asian, 0.76% from other races, and 0.72% from two or more races. Hispanic or Latino of any race were 1.77%.

There were 2,691 households, 39.7% had children under the age of 18 living with them, 68.6% were married couples living together, 6.2% had a female householder with no husband present, and 21.9% were non-families. 18.2% of households were made up of individuals, and 6.9% were one person aged 65 or older. The average household size was 2.92 and the average family size was 3.35.

The age distribution was 30.8% under the age of 18, 8.1% from 18 to 24, 27.8% from 25 to 44, 21.2% from 45 to 64, and 12.1% 65 or older. The median age was 34 years. For every 100 females, there were 96.5 males. For every 100 females age 18 and over, there were 93.2 males.

The median household income was $48,025 and the median family income was $53,295. Males had a median income of $37,270 versus $22,487 for females. The per capita income for the township was $19,588. About 3.5% of families and 5.9% of the population were below the poverty line, including 9.4% of those under age 18 and 5.2% of those age 65 or over.

== Government ==
=== Elected officials representing Ephrata Township ===
- Pennsylvania Governor Josh Shapiro (D)
- Senior United States Senator John Fetterman (D)
- Junior United States Senator Dave McCormick (R)
- United States Congressman Lloyd Smucker (R)
- Pennsylvania State Senator James Malone (D)
- Pennsylvania State Representative Keith Greiner (R)
