= Hibshman Farm =

- U.S. National Register of Historic Places
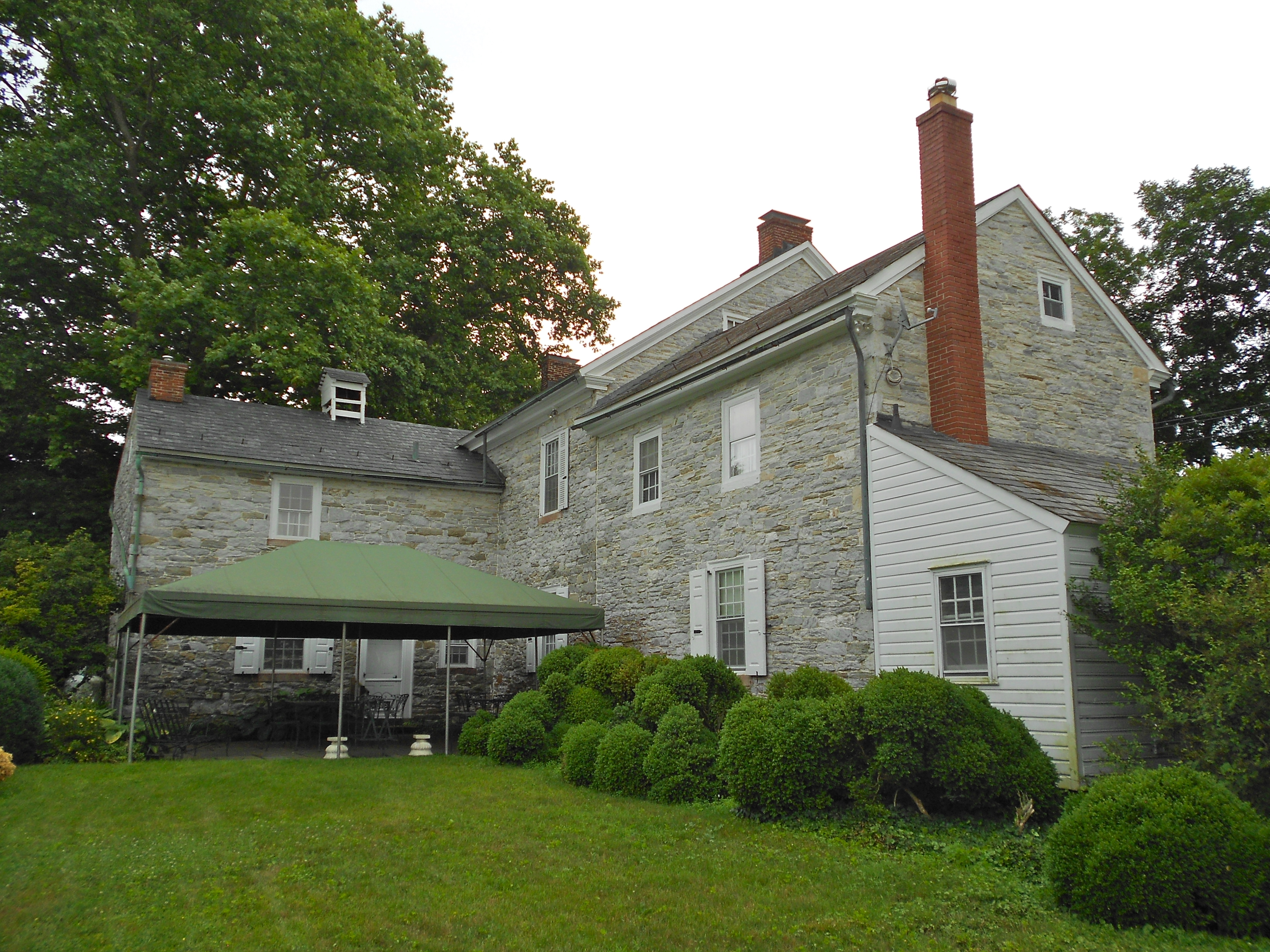
- Rear of the house

- Location within Pennsylvania Location within the United States
- Location: Springville Road, Ephrata Township, Pennsylvania
- Coordinates: 40°12′18″N 76°10′33″W
- Area: 78 acres (32 ha)
- Built: 1750-1760, 1801, 1803
- Built by: Hibschman, Wendell
- Architectural style: Georgian
- NRHP reference No.: 80003517
- Added to NRHP: June 27, 1980

The Hibshman Farm, also known as the Schantz Farm, is an historic home and farm complex which is located in Ephrata Township, Lancaster County, Pennsylvania.

It was listed on the National Register of Historic Places in 1980.

== History and architectural features ==
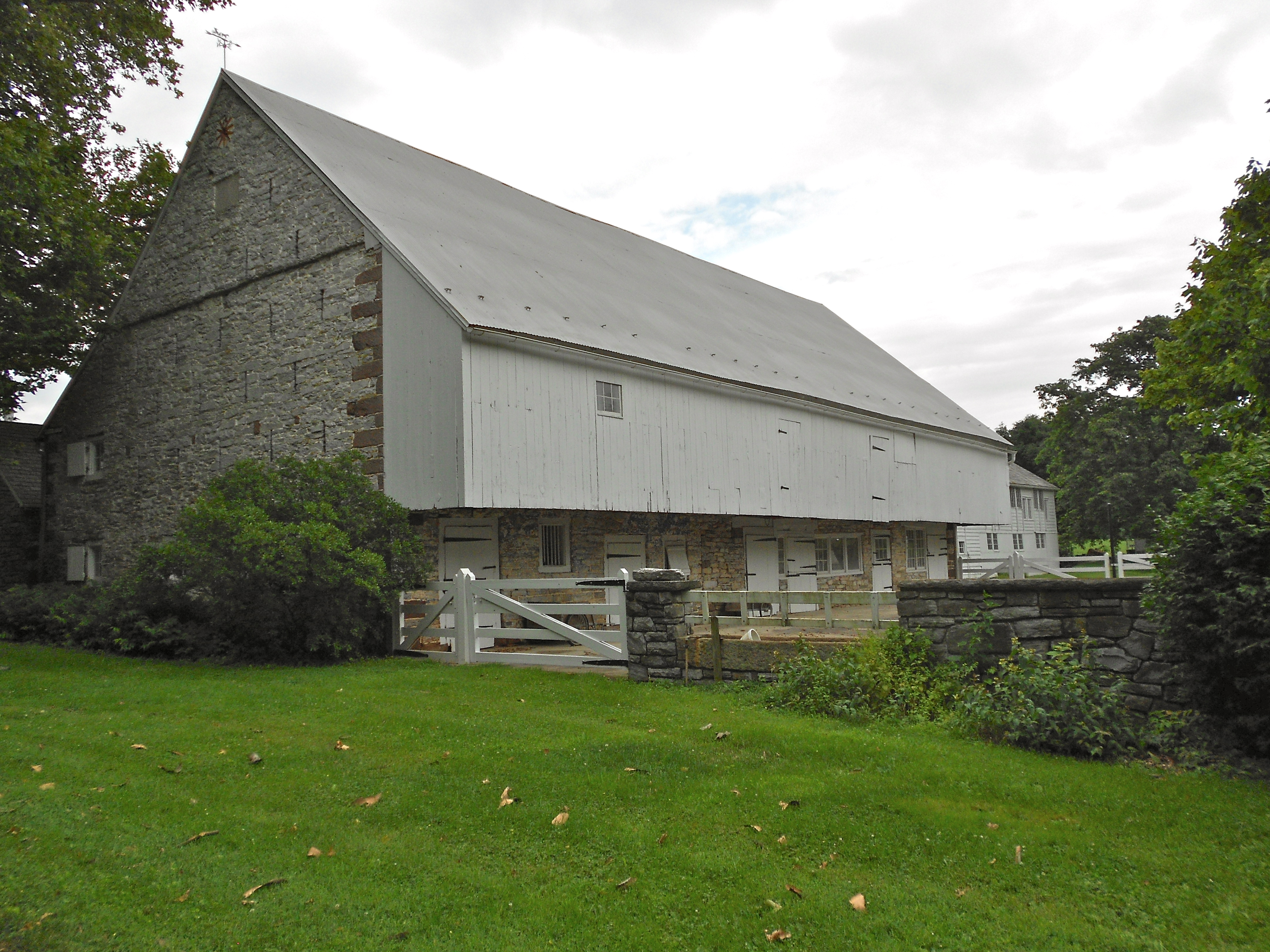
The Hibshman Barn

This historic complex includes the original farmhouse, wash house, stone barn, silo, tobacco shed, tobacco barn, and a second farmhouse.

The original farmhouse was built in three sections. The oldest section was erected sometime between 1750 and 1760. The one-and-one-half-story, stone, gable-roofed structure, which is situated at the rear of the farmhouse, was expanded in 1801 with the addition of a second section. A lower stone wing was then built circa 1803. The interior was designed in the Georgian style.
