= Peter and Catherine Reyer Farmhouse =

Historic house in Pennsylvania, United States

- U.S. National Register of Historic Places
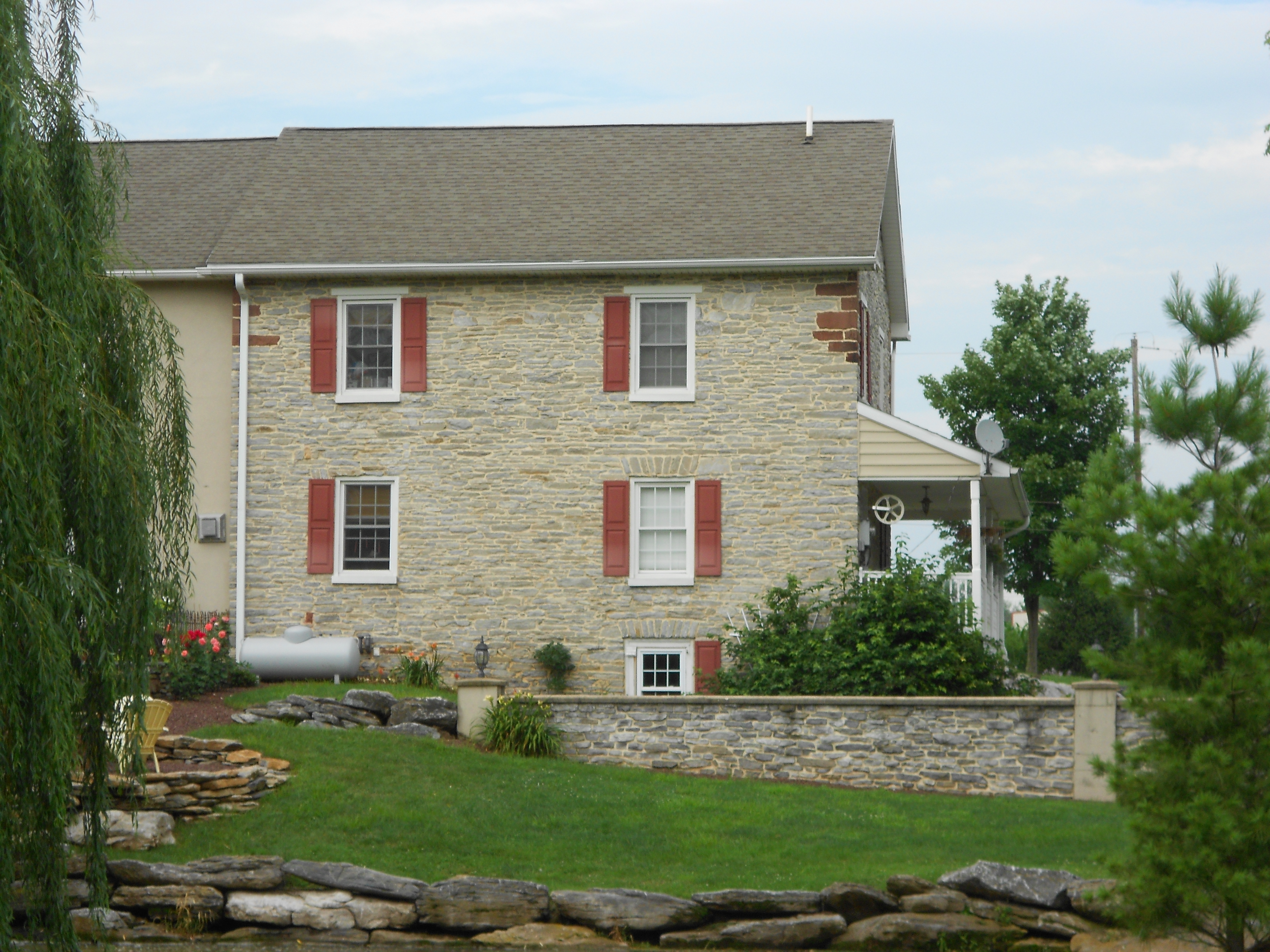

- Location within Pennsylvania Location within the United States
- Location: Trout Run Rd., W of jct. with PA 272, Ephrata Township, Pennsylvania
- Coordinates: 40°11′39″N 76°10′45″W
- Area: 10 acres (4.0 ha)
- Built: 1792, c. 1875
- Architectural style: Pennsylvania German
- MPS: Historic Farming Resources of Lancaster County MPS
- NRHP reference No.: 96001314
- Added to NRHP: November 7, 1996

Peter and Catherine Reyer Farmhouse is a historic home located at Ephrata Township, Lancaster County, Pennsylvania. It was built in 1792, and is a two-story, four bay by two bay, limestone Germanic dwelling. It was remodeled about 1875, into a Pennsylvania style farmhouse.

It was listed on the National Register of Historic Places in 1996.
