= Kissel Hill, Pennsylvania =

Unincorporated community in Pennsylvania, US

- Unincorporated community
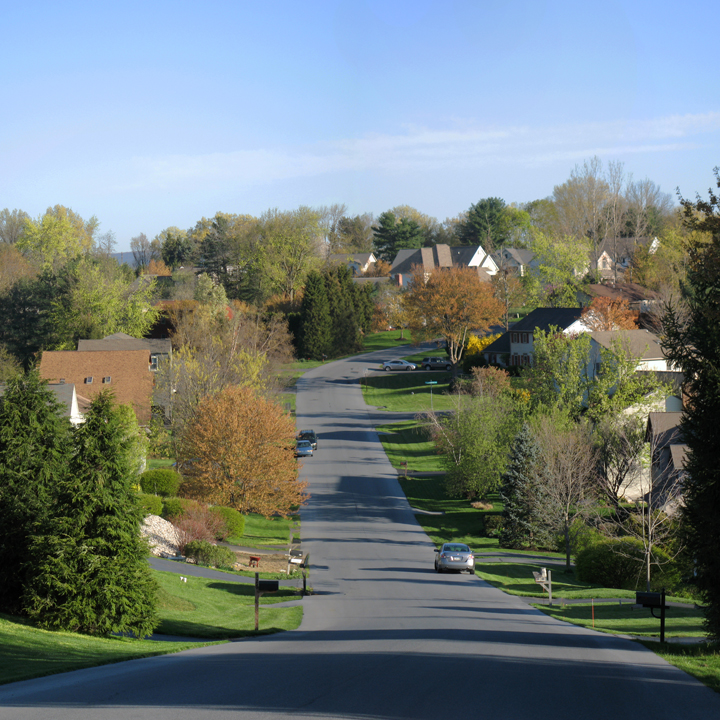
- Warwick Township, PA, USA

- Location in Pennsylvania Location in the United States
- Coordinates: 40°8′21″N 76°17′51″W
- Country: United States
- State: Pennsylvania
- County: Lancaster
- Township: Warwick
- Elevation: 525 ft (160 m)

Population (2010)
  - Total: 38
- Time zone: UTC-5 (Eastern (EST))
  - Summer (DST): UTC-4 (EDT)
- GNIS feature ID: 1200091

Kissel Hill is an unincorporated community located in Warwick Township in Lancaster County, Pennsylvania, United States. Kissel Hill is located just south of Lititz.
