= Benjamin Eby =

Canadian minister

Bishop Benjamin Eby
- Born: 2 May 1785; Hammer Creek, Lancaster County, Pennsylvania, United States
- Died: 28 June 1853 (aged 68); Berlin, Canada West
- Burial place: First Mennonite Cemetery, Kitchener, Ontario, Canada
- Occupation: Mennonite minister
- Known for: Founder of Ebytown
- Spouses: Mary Brubacher (m. 1807; died 1834): Magdalena Erb
- Children: 11
- Parents: Christian Eby (father); Catharine Bricker (mother)

Bishop Benjamin Eby (2 May 1785 – 28 June 1853) was a Canadian minister, schoolteacher, farmer, author, and community leader. He was a pioneer of the Mennonite community in Canada and a strong proponent of nonresistance.

== Biography ==
Benjamin Eby was born in 1785 at a homestead on Hammer Creek, Lancaster County, Pennsylvania. He emigrated to Upper Canada in 1806 and purchased a large tract of land in what would later become Kitchener, Ontario. He became a Mennonite preacher in 1809, and by 1811 or 1813 had built a log Mennonite meeting house used as a school house and for religious services. He was Bishop from 1812 and was responsible for the growth of Mennonite Church Canada in Waterloo County.

Eby authored numerous published works including a hymn book, catechism, several school texts, and a church history. His church history in particular demonstrated "the nonresistant stance and his belief that war is unacceptable in the Kingdom of God".

Eby encouraged manufacturers to his settlement known as "Ebytown". He is credited with encouraging the peaceful coexistence of Mennonites with the rest of the community, and promoted reconciliation and unity on an international scale as well.

"He freely opened his church to non-Mennonites and developed warm friendships with local businessmen of different faiths. He donated some of his own land to two men who wished to establish a furniture factory, and gave encouragement and financial aid toward the creation of a printing and publishing business. Hoping to create an international Mennonite fellowship, Eby cultivated a relationship, through correspondence, with church leaders in Europe and America. His rapport with non-Mennonites and his leadership and oratory skills undoubtedly contributed to the gains made by Mennonites in consolidating their peace position in Canada."

— Harold Josephson, Biographical Dictionary of Modern Peace Leaders (1985)

In his mid-forties, Eby's settlement was renamed from Ebytown to Berlin, and in the year of his death Berlin became the county seat of the newly created County of Waterloo, elevating it to the status of Village. (It was designated a city in 1912 and renamed as Kitchener in 1916.)
