= Warwick Township, Lancaster County, Pennsylvania =

Township in Pennsylvania, US

Coordinates: 40°09′00″N 76°15′59″W

- Township
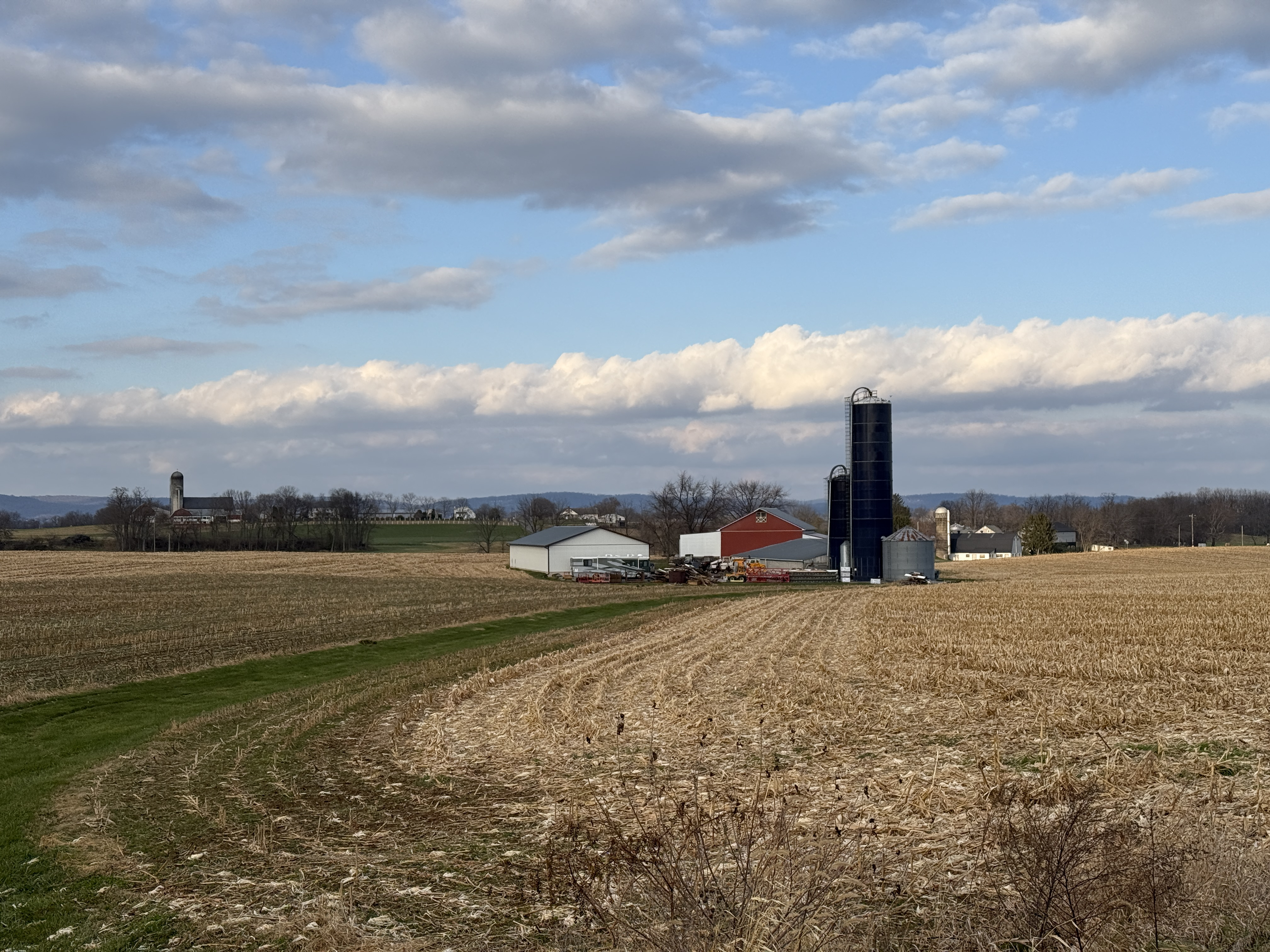
- Farmland in Warwick Township

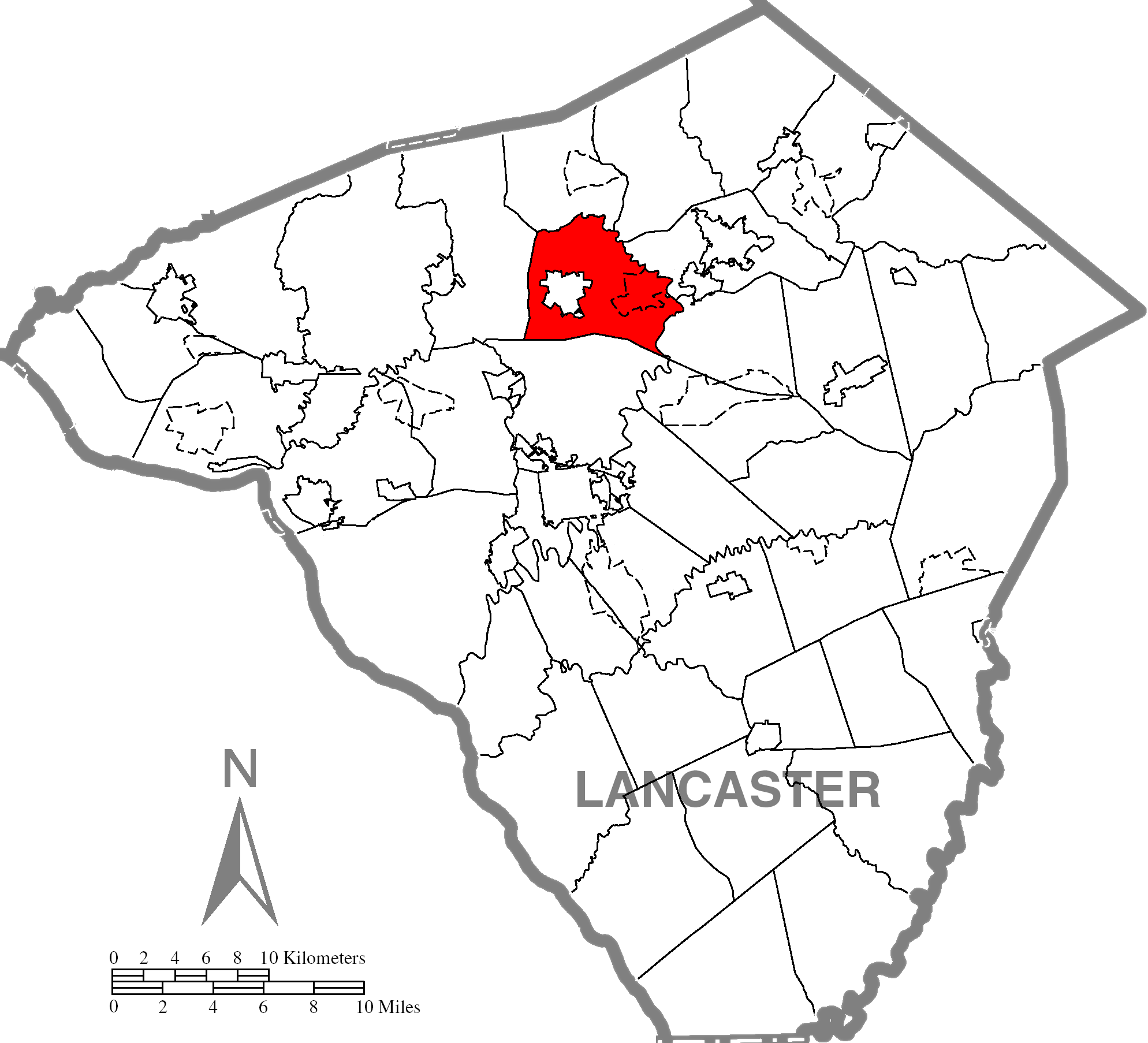
- Map of Lancaster County highlighting Warwick Township
- Country: United States
- State: Pennsylvania
- County: Lancaster
- Settled: 1716
- Incorporated: 1729

Government
  - Type: Board of Supervisors

Area
  - Total: 19.92 sq mi (51.58 km^{2})
  - Land: 19.77 sq mi (51.20 km^{2})
  - Water: 0.15 sq mi (0.38 km^{2})

Population (2020)
  - Total: 19,068 ▲
  - Estimate (2021): 19,097
  - Density: 954.1/sq mi (368.38/km^{2})
- Time zone: UTC-5 (Eastern (EST))
  - Summer (DST): UTC-4 (EDT)
- Area code: 717
- FIPS code: 42-071-81168
- Website: www.warwicktownship.org

Warwick Township is a township in north-central Lancaster County, Pennsylvania, United States. The population was 19,068 at the 2020 census. It completely surrounds the borough of Lititz and contains the unincorporated villages of Brunnerville, Disston, Kissel Hill, Lexington, Millway, and Rothsville.

== History ==
The area's first settler was Richard Carter, who settled by the mouth of the Conestoga River in 1716. Carter was born in Warwickshire, England. Carter is given credit for naming the municipality "Warwick".The Buck Hill Farm Covered Bridge, and Zook's Mill Covered Bridge are listed on the National Register of Historic Places.

== Geography ==
According to the United States Census Bureau, the township has a total area of 19.9 square miles (51.5 km^{2}), of which 19.8 square miles (51.3 km^{2}) are land and 0.08 square miles (0.2 km^{2}), or 0.40%, are water.

The township surrounds the borough of Lititz, a separate municipality. The township's largest village is located in the eastern area. There are some smaller villages.

== Demographics ==
Historical population
Census	Pop.	Note	%±
2000	15,475		—
2010	17,783		14.9%
2020	19,068		7.2%
2021 (est.)	19,097		0.2%
U.S. Decennial Census

At the 2000 census there were 15,475 people, 5,568 households, and 4,448 families living in the township. The population density was 782.0 inhabitants per square mile (301.9/km^{2}). There were 5,707 housing units at an average density of 288.4 per square mile (111.4/km^{2}). The racial makeup of the township was 97.25% White, 0.48% African American, 0.09% Native American, 0.85% Asian, 0.05% Pacific Islander, 0.43% from other races, and 0.85% from two or more races. Hispanic or Latino people of any race were 1.56%.

There were 5,568 households, 39.0% had children under the age of 18 living with them, 71.3% were married couples living together, 6.3% had a female householder with no husband present, and 20.1% were non-families. 16.3% of households were made up of individuals, and 4.5% were one person aged 65 or older. The average household size was 2.75 and the average family size was 3.10.

The age distribution was 28.0% under the age of 18, 6.5% from 18 to 24, 31.3% from 25 to 44, 23.8% from 45 to 64, and 10.4% 65 or older. The median age was 36 years. For every 100 females, there were 97.7 males. For every 100 females age 18 and over, there were 93.5 males.

The median household income was $55,007 and the median family income was $59,701. Males had a median income of $42,153 versus $27,266 for females. The per capita income for the township was $22,831. About 2.8% of families and 3.6% of the population were below the poverty line, including 4.9% of those under age 18 and 3.9% of those age 65 or over.
