= Rothsville, Pennsylvania =

Unincorporated community in Pennsylvania, US

Rothsville, Pennsylvania Haasebarig (Pennsylvania German)
- Census-designated place
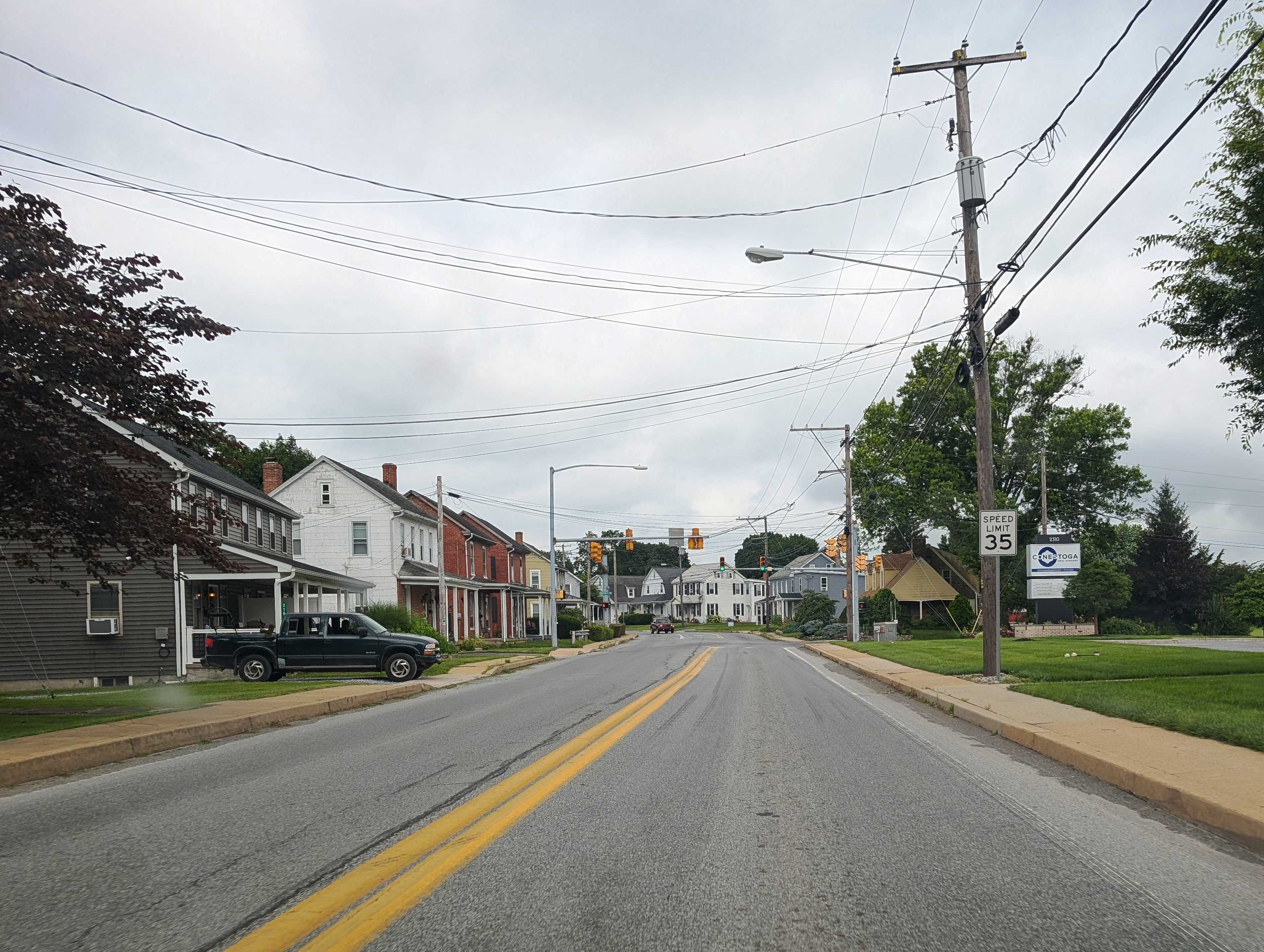
- PA 772 westbound in Rothsville

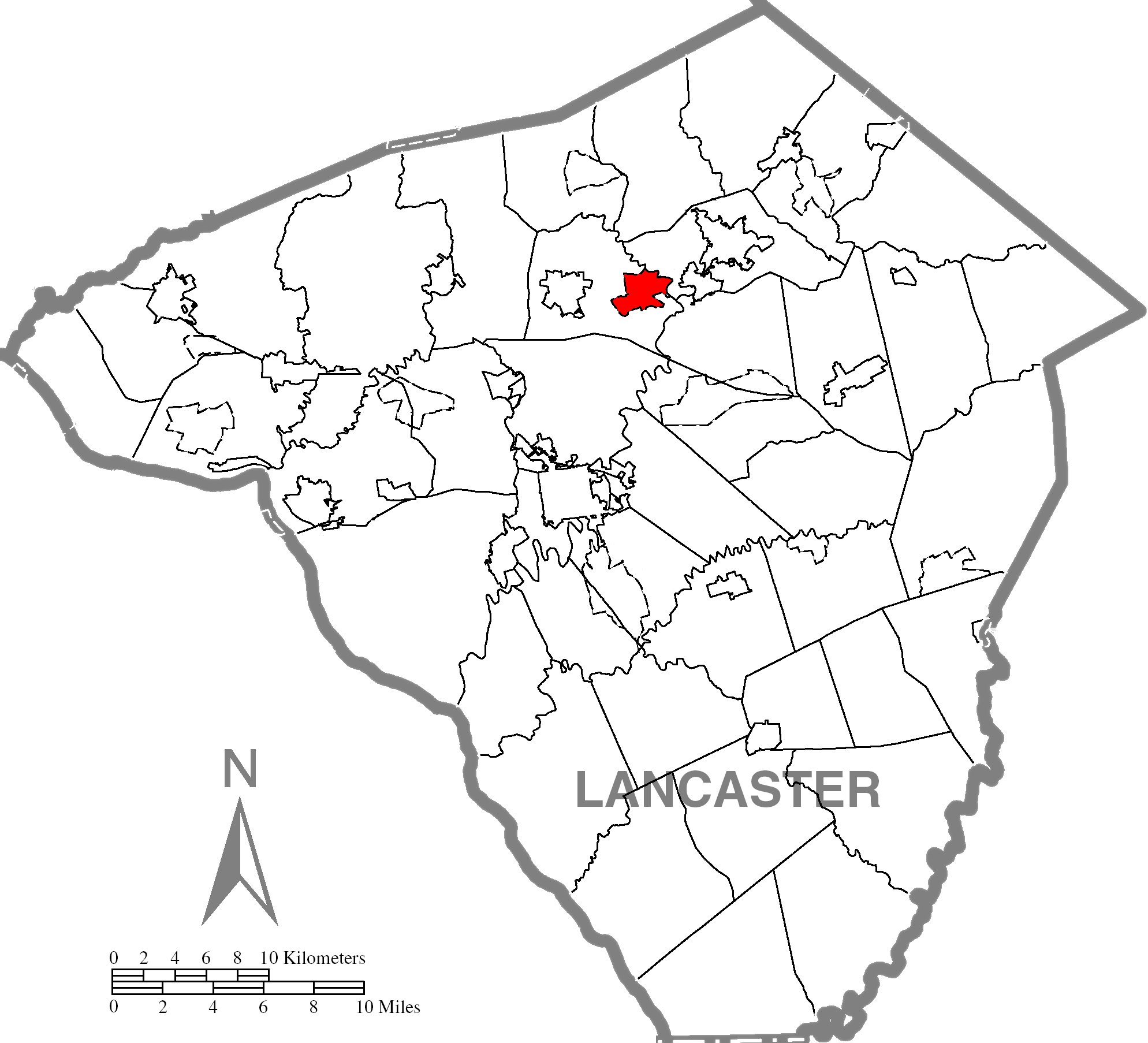
- Location of Rothsville in Lancaster County, Pennsylvania

- Location in Pennsylvania Location in the United States
- Coordinates: 40°9′5″N 76°15′4″W
- Country: United States
- State: Pennsylvania
- County: Lancaster
- Township: Warwick

Area
  - Total: 2.48 sq mi (6.43 km^{2})
  - Land: 2.46 sq mi (6.38 km^{2})
  - Water: 0.015 sq mi (0.04 km^{2})
- Elevation: 490 ft (150 m)

Population (2010)
  - Total: 3,044
  - Density: 1,235/sq mi (476.9/km^{2})
- Time zone: UTC-5 (Eastern (EST))
  - Summer (DST): UTC-4 (EDT)
- ZIP Code: 17543 (Lititz)
- Area code: 717
- FIPS code: 42-66392
- GNIS feature ID: 1185510

Rothsville (Pennsylvania German: Haasebarig) is an unincorporated community and census-designated place (CDP) in Warwick Township, Lancaster County, Pennsylvania, United States. The population was 3,044 at the 2010 census. Lititz is the town for residents' mailing addresses.

== History ==
Rothsville was founded in 1790 by Philip Roth, an early settler and tavern keeper.

== Geography ==
Rothsville is located in northern Lancaster County, in the eastern part of Warwick Township. Pennsylvania Route 772 is the community's Main Street; the highway leads west 3 miles (5 km) to Lititz and southeast 2.5 miles (4.0 km) to U.S. Route 222 in Brownstown. Lancaster, the county seat, is 10 miles (16 km) south-southwest of Rothsville, and Ephrata is 4.5 miles (7.2 km) to the northeast.

According to the United States Census Bureau, the CDP has a total area of 2.5 square miles (6.4 km^{2}), of which 0.02 square miles (0.04 km^{2}), or 0.67%, are water. Cocalico Creek and its tributary Hammer Creek form the northeastern boundary of Rothsville (as well as the border with Ephrata Township), and Lititz Run forms the southwestern boundary. Cocalico Creek and Lititz Run are tributaries of the Conestoga River, which flows southwest to the Susquehanna.

== Transportation ==
Pennsylvania Route 772, in part the old Mount Hope-Newport Road, runs through the town.

The Reading Railroad operated passenger service from its station outside the town on Rothsville Station Road until 1952. The Warwick to Ephrata Rail Trail now runs on the route of the old railroad through the north side of Rothsville between active sections of the line in Lititz and Ephrata.

== Demographics ==
At the 2000 census there were 3,017 people, 1,038 households, and 852 families living in the CDP. The population density was 1,221.1 inhabitants per square mile (471.5/km^{2}). There were 1,060 housing units at an average density of 429.0 per square mile (165.6/km^{2}). The racial makeup of the CDP was 95.86% White, 0.33% African American, 1.29% Asian, 0.70% from other races, and 1.82% from two or more races. Hispanic or Latino of any race were 2.92%.

There were 1,038 households, 46.6% had children under the age of 18 living with them, 71.6% were married couples living together, 7.3% had a female householder with no husband present, and 17.9% were non-families. 13.9% of households were made up of individuals, and 3.3% were one person aged 65 or older. The average household size was 2.91 and the average family size was 3.21.

The age distribution was 32.2% under the age of 18, 6.8% from 18 to 24, 34.0% from 25 to 44, 20.9% from 45 to 64, and 6.0% 65 or older. The median age was 34 years. For every 100 females, there were 100.3 males. For every 100 females age 18 and over, there were 94.2 males.

The median household income was $52,694 and the median family income was $54,000. Males had a median income of $38,953 versus $25,000 for females. The per capita income for the CDP was $18,535. About 5.2% of families and 5.5% of the population were below the poverty line, including 7.0% of those under age 18 and 6.0% of those age 65 or over.
